= Beaconsfield (gallery) =

Art gallery in Vauxhall, London

Coordinates: 51.4920°N 0.1187°W

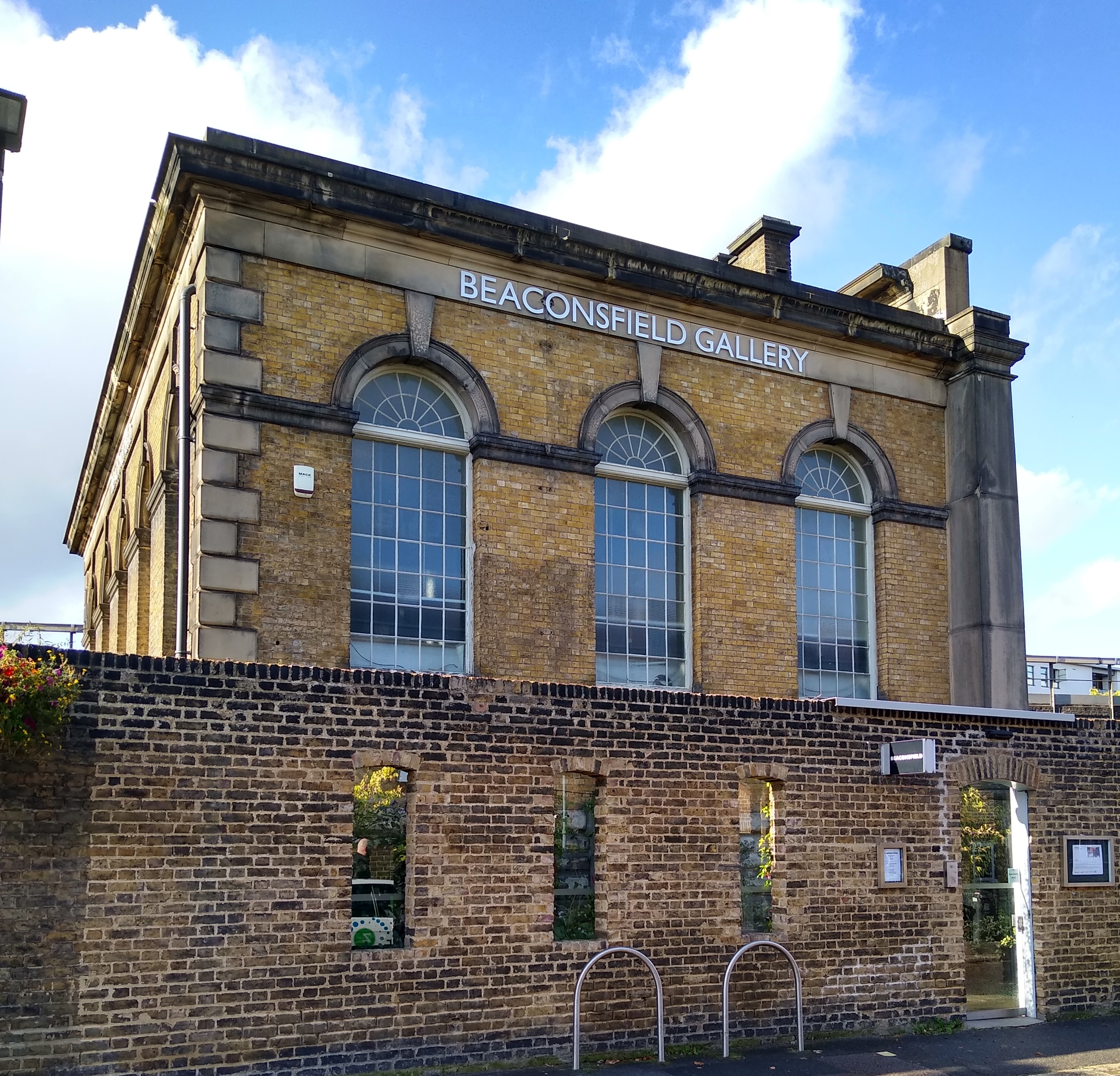
Beaconsfield Gallery

Beaconsfield is an artist-run non-profit art space situated in South London's gallery district, Vauxhall, England. Spread over two large spaces encompassing a railway arch tunnel and the former Lambeth ragged school, the organisation run a yearly programme of exhibitions. The central focus of the gallery is to "provide a critical space for creative enquiry", additionally acting as a testbed and primary research vehicle informing theories of curatorial practice and the practice of making art.

== History ==
The project was founded in 1994 by David Crawforth, Angus Neill and Naomi Siderfin. Originally designed to "fill a niche between the institution, the commercial and the 'alternative'", and provide a resource for the development and presentation of contemporary art. The Beaconsfield project was named for audiences to experience high quality ('beacon'), challenging, new art works in a wide range ('field') of contemporary visual art media.

In 1995 Beaconsfield leased the derelict former Lambeth Ragged School site in Newport Street, Vauxhall and the trio set about refurbishing the building to art centre standards. In September of that year they opened Plein Air to the public; an exhibition-residency with German artist and stonemason Matthias Jackisch performing in the company of a 19th century oil painting by Felix Ziem.

In 1997 Neill left the trio to open Felder Fine Art. Since then the creative partnership of Siderfin and Crawforth has delivered the artistic programme. Crawforth and Siderfin were listed in the Artlyst Power 100 List in 2012 and 2013.

Prior to establishing Beaconsfield, Siderfin and Crawforth started Nosepaint, an organization that presented interdisciplinary art events involving artists, writers, film makers and musicians between 1991 and 1994. Since 1994 they've collaborated together, and with occasional others, on art projects under the moniker Beaconsfield Art Works or BAW.

== Commissions programme ==
The Beaconsfield project involves the commissioning of interdisciplinary visual art exhibitions supported by artist residencies that are open to the public. It has been awarded public funding from Arts Council England from 1996. As a non-profit and registered charity Beaconsfield is reliant on trusts, private individuals and foundation funding.

Past commissions and collaborations have included: Sonia Boyce, Franko B, Deborah Levy, Bruce Gilbert, Fiona Banner, Hayley Newman, Bob and Roberta Smith, Susan Collis, Tomomi Adachi, Tamsyn Challenger, Mark Fell, Tracey Emin, Mark Wallinger, Keith Piper

== Exhibitions ==
Notable exhibitions include:

- 1994 – 'The Lisson Gallery' produced by Nosepaint/Beaconsfield; Matthew Arnatt, David Crawforth, David Mollin
- 1994 – Beaconsfield at Ministry of Sound presents Nosepaint with Bluff, David Crawforth, Robert Ellis, DJ Fuckwit, Bruce Gilchrist, David Gilchrist, Sue Hart, Ian Hinchliffe, Lindsay John, Niki Jewett, Loophole Cinema, Karen malarky, Angus Neill, Andrew Wilkey, Seven Sisters Group, Naomi Siderfin, Dr Rapakini with Eli, Eastern Sound System, Hugh Harris, Judge Jules, LMC, Graham Massey, Skip McDonald, Billy Nasty, Pure Silver, Talvin Singh, Doug Wimbish, Hariharan Zuveya
- 1995 – A Public Work of Art, Beaconsfield ArtWorks (BAW), sound sculpture (Royal Festival Hall). Accompanying Dialogues, BAW with Nicholas Logsdail, Greg Hilty and Ministry of Sound, Artifice CD-ROm article
- 1995 – Sonja Boyce, Kate Bush, Mikey Cuddihy, Siobhan Davies, Elsie Mitchell, Claire Palmier, Naomi Siderfin
- 1996 – Jo Stockham and Deborah Levy, BAW, Chris Ofili, Alistair Raphael, Jo Stockham, Anne Tallentire
- 1996 – Uli Aigner, Keith Arnatt, BAW, Debbie Booth, Wayne Lloyd and Laurence Harvey, Ronald Fraser Munro and Jeremy Blank, O(rphan) d(rift>), Polskadavians, PuT PuT, Patricia Scanlan, Trebor Scholtz, Julian Stallabrass, Strike, Verso 12 hour book launch
- 1996 – Kirsty Alexander and Paul Burwell, BAW, Anne Bean, John Carson, Sarah Cole, David Cunningham, Bruce Gilchrist and Nick Rogers, Matthias Jackisch, Michal Klega, Rona Lee, Alastair Maclennan, Guillaume Paris, Sonja Zelic
- 1996 – Eija-Liisa Ahtila, Andy Best and Merja Puustinen, Pia Lindman, Pekka Niskanen, Roi Vaara, first UK exhibition of contemporary Finnish art curated by Andy Best and Merja Puustinen, co-produced with MUU ry
- 1996 – David Crawforth, Hayley Newman and Pan Sonic with David Cunningham, Robert Ellis, Bruce Gilbert, David Gilchrist, Alison Goldfrapp, Tiina Huczkowski, Kaffe Matthews, PuT PuT, Sanctuary Ministries Music Team, Scanner, Susan Stenger, Jimi Tenor, Paul Thomas, Simon Fisher Turner
- 1997 – Fiona Banner, Ceponyte and Ozarinscas, Lucy Gunning, Evaldas Jansas, Linas Liandzbergis, David Mollin, Deimantas Narkevicius, Aturas Raila with Darius Ciuta, Scanner, Thomson & Craighead
- 1997 – Keith Coventry, Stuart Brisley, Robert Ellis, Tracey Emin, Bruce Gilchrist, Hayley Newman, Mark Wallinger
- 1997 – Tomoko Takahashi, Neill Quinton
- 1998 – Anna Best, Robert Beard, Keith Coventry, Tamsin Pender
- 1999 – O(rphan) d(rift>) and CCRu with Pat Cardigan, John Cussans, Kodwo Eshun, Nick Land. Sound produced by Kode9, Apache61 and Ocosi
- 1999 – Silent Movie, Chris Marker
- 1999 – Gisle Frøysland, Bruce Gilchrist, Michelle Griffiths, Mattias Harenstam, Geir Tore Holm, 4 x Kanari, Rona Lee, Tor Magnus Lundeby, Hayley Newman, Bob and Roberta Smith
- 1999 – New Contemporaries '99 co-hosted with Milch and South London Gallery
- 2000 – Franko B
- 2000 – Sheela Gowda, NS Harsha, Nasreem Mohomedi
- 2001 – Shozo Shimamoto
- 2003 – Susan Collis
- 2003 – Paul Newland and Audrey Riley
- 2004 – Laura Ford
- 2004 – Gu(:)n (Yu, SAm2, Yumi Hara aKa DJAnakonda, Tomomi Adachi, Michiyoshi Isozaki
- 2005 – Mark Dean, Peter Collis, Chiara Pirito, Chris Cornish, Susan Pui San Lok, Mattias Härenstram, João Seguro, Zineb Sedira, Semiconductor
- 2005 – Carl Michael von Hausswolff
- 2005 – Eija-Liisa Ahtila, BAW, Anna Best, Susan Collis, Keith Coventry, Mikey Cuddihy, Shane Cullen, Robert Ellis, Bruce Gilbert, Carl Michael von Hausswolff and Thomas Nordanstad, John Isaacs, Hayley Newman, nobleandsilver, Bob and Roberta Smith, Kerry Stewart, Tomako Takahashi
- 2005 – Dave Ball and guests, David Cunningham/Karen Mirza and Brad Butler, Clippetyclop, Annie Davey, Judith Dean, Mark Dean, Dirty Snow, DJ Seed, Bruce Gilbert, Howard Jacques, Ken Ardley Playboys, Monkey Cloakroom, Jo Robertson, Stash, Alexander Wendt
- 2007 – Bruce Gilchrist and Jo Joelson
- 2007 – Leafcutter John
- 2007 – Stuart Brisley, Ian Hinchliffe (incorporating Estate), Alastair Maclennan, Tatsumi Orimoto
- 2008 – Mark and John Bain, John Butcher, Michael Colligan, Rhodri Davies, Benedict Drew, Robin Hayward, Gustav Metzger, Lee Patterson, Sarah Washington
- 2008 – Melanie Clifford, Annie Davey, Paul B Davis, Hauschka, Howard Jacques, Lundahl and Seitl, Liz Murray, Andrew Parker, Serafina Steer, Tetine, Jessica Voorsanger, Weirdcore
- 2008 – Drew Daniel, Nitewreckers, People Like us, Le Couteau Jaune, DJ Tendraw, Howard Jacques, Mark Dean, Jay Lesser, Kaffe Matthews, Stephen Gosh, Stephen Thrower, Carter Tutti, in association with Lumin
- 2008 – Katherine Arianello and Naomi Siderfin, Dave Ball, BAW, Annie Davey, Minna Haukka, Susannah Hewlett, Howard Jacques, Hayley Newman and David Crawforth, Liz Murray, Bob and Roberta Smith, Andrew Poppy, Victor Mount, Leonardo Ulian, Nicolas Bourriaud, Kim Noble, Jessica Voorsanger (Late @ Tate), curated by Beaconsfield
- 2009 – Bob and Roberta Smith
- 2009 – Monica Ross
- 2009 – John Wynne
- 2009 – Monica Ross with Lou Birks, Stephen Dwoskin, Andrew Kötting, Sandra Lahire, Justin Edgar and Maxa Zoller
- 2010 – Anthony Gross, Michael Curran, Lucy Gunning
- 2011 – Bruce Gilbert and BAW
- 2012 – Rachel Garfield and Stephen Dwoskin
- 2012 – Tamsyn Challenger
- 2012 – Monica Ross
- 2012 – Mike Harding and Jon Wozencroft, Touch 30
- 2014 – Station House Opera
- 2014 – Ellie Harrison
- 2016 – FOAM TALENT
- 2016 – Mulfinger and Budgett, Giorgio Sadotti
- 2017 – Keith Piper
- 2019 – Trevor Mathison, Gary Stewart – Dubmorphology
- 2022 – Monica Sjöö
- 2022 – Mark Fell
- 2023 – Nastaran Säde Rönkkö

== Location ==
Beaconsfield Gallery occupies two spaces in Newport st, Vauxhall: a former Lambeth Ragged School and a large scale railway tunnel situated behind the main building.

The street-facing Victorian building housed one of the Ragged Schools established between 1849 and 1851 by Henry Beaufoy. It was dedicated to the free education of destitute children and named after the appearance of the poverty-ridden in attendance.

Network Rail and its predecessors have owned the site since 1903, when most of the school was taken down for the expansion of the railway.

== General references ==
- Jones, Brittany Rosemary (1 September 2022). "Monica Sjöö: The time is NOW and it is overdue!". The Brooklyn Rail.
- Bloomfield, Ruth (8 October 2015). "How London's Kennington Triangle is being reborn as a culture hub". The Spaces.
- Fox, Dan (3 March 2003). "Noble & Silver". Frieze. No. 73. ISSN 0962-0672.
- Buck, Louisa (1 June 1998). "OPENINGS: TOMOKO TAKAHASHI". Artforum.
- Purseglove, Laura (6 October 2016). "8 Artist-Run Galleries Breaking New Ground in London". Artsy.
- "10 of the best arts venues in south London". The Guardian. 5 May 2011. ISSN 0261-3077.
- "Model behaviour: the surreal human sculptures of Manon Wertenbroek – in pictures". the Guardian. 20 April 2016. ISSN 0261-3077.
