= Electra (arts organisation) =

British non-profit arts organization

Electra is a London-based non-profit arts organisation that commissions new work by artists working across sound art, moving image, performance and visual art. The organisation particularly works with feminist concerns and overlooked histories. One of its earliest projects, Her Noise, has an archive, the Her Noise Archive, that is housed by University of the Arts, London Archives and Special Collections at London College of Communication, and has an online resource hernoise.org.

Electra was founded by Lina Dzuverovic and Anne Hilde Neset in 2003 and the current director is Irene Revell (since 2011). The organisation has received regular funding from Arts Council England since 2005. Electra is part of the Common Practice network and has a partnership with UbuWeb.

Electra has worked with a wide range of artistic practitioners including Lawrence Abu Hamdan, Holly Antrum, Vicki Bennett, Steve Beresford, The Bohman Brothers, Sonia Boyce, Angus Carlyle, Maria Chavez, Beatrice Dillon, Kenneth Goldsmith, Goodiepal, Kim Gordon, Carl Michael von Hausswolff, Emma Hedditch, Will Holder, Karl Holmqvist, Claire Hooper, Holly Ingleton, Jakob Kirkegaard, Jutta Koether, Christina Kubisch, Cathy Lane, Isla Leaver-Yap, Annea Lockwood, Pauline Boudry / Renate Lorenz, Lydia Lunch, Christian Marclay, Daria Martin, Kaffe Matthews, Eline McGeorge, Claudia Molitor, Carlos Motta, Hayley Newman, Pil and Galia Kollectiv, Pauline Oliveros, Olivia Plender, Charlotte Prodger, Lucy Reynolds, James Richards, Marina Rosenfeld, Dawn Scarfe, Richard Thomas, Cara Tolmie, Mareike Bernien/ Kerstin Schroedinger, Matthias Sperling, Verity Susman, Sue Tompkins, Salomé Voegelin, YKON.

Electra does not have an exhibition space, but presents projects with a large range of local and international partners including Badischer Kunstverein (Karlsruhe, Germany), Barbican, Bergen Kunsthall (Norway), Cafe Oto, CRiSAP, Drugo more (Croatia), Flat Time House, Goethe Institut London, ICA London, Kings Place, Kunstmuseet KUBE (Norway), Les Laboratoires d'Aubervilliers (Paris, France), LUX, Playground Festival (Belgium), Queen Mary, University of London, The Showroom, South London Gallery, Tate Britain, Tate Modern, The Wire magazine.
