= Diploma =

Educational document

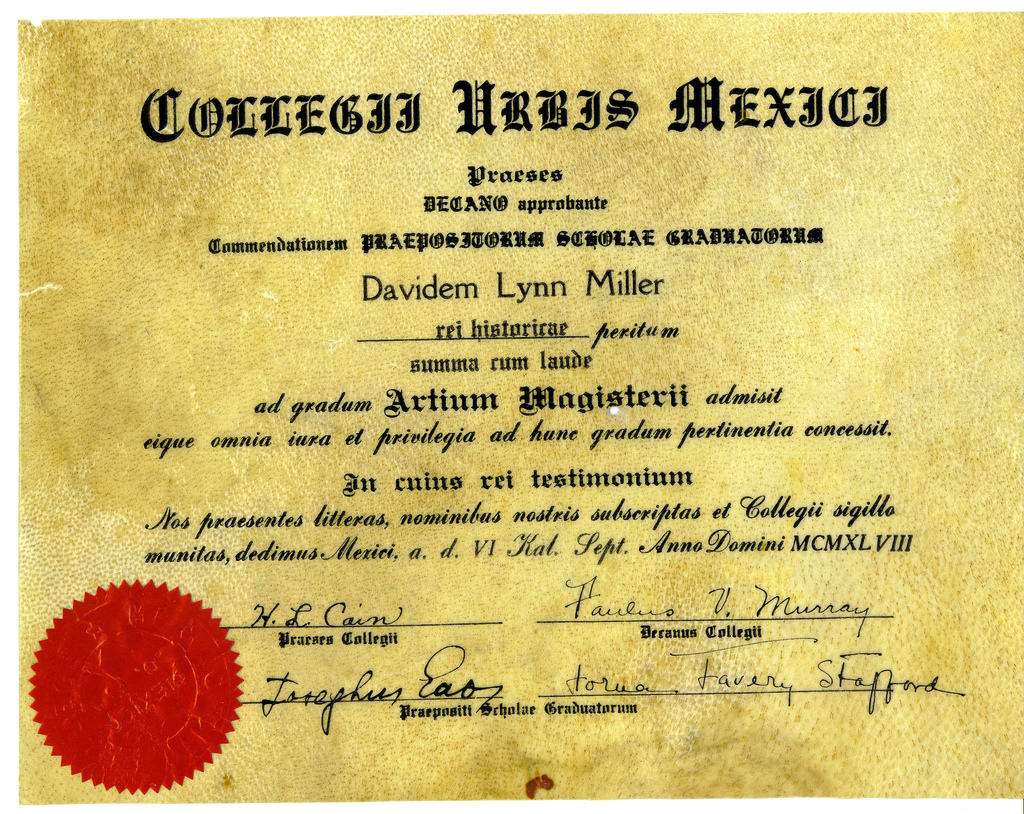
Sheepskin diploma from Mexico City College, 1948 (in Latin)

A diploma is a document awarded by an educational institution (such as a college or university) testifying the recipient has graduated by successfully completing their courses of studies. Historically, it has also referred to a charter or official document of diplomacy.

The diploma (as a document certifying a qualification) may also be called a testamur, Latin for "we testify" or "certify" (testari), so called from the word with which the certificate begins; this is commonly used in Australia to refer to the document certifying the award of a degree. Alternatively, this document can simply be referred to as a degree certificate or graduation certificate, or as a parchment. The certificate that a Nobel laureate receives is also called a diploma.

The term diploma is also used in some historical contexts, to refer to documents signed by a monarch affirming a grant or tenure of specified land and its conditions (see Anglo-Saxon charters and diplomatics).

== Usage ==
=== Australia ===
In Australia, there are three varieties of Diploma currently recognized by the Australian Qualifications Framework (AQF):

- a "Diploma", a level-five qualification (Undergraduate Degree) granted by vocational education and training (VET) sector or university. It is typically completed with 12 to 18 months of full-time study. When accepted for credit as part of a bachelor's degree, it is usually deemed to be equivalent to the first year of the degree.
- an "Advanced Diploma", which is equivalent to an Australian "Associate Degree" and is equivalent to the second year of a bachelor's degree.
- a "Graduate Diploma", which is undertaken after completing a bachelor's degree (or being deemed to have equivalent knowledge). This can be in a field other than that covered by said degree (e.g., the Graduate Diploma of Education which was historically required to become a schoolteacher in most Australian states, since 2016 the schoolteacher requirement in Australia is now a master's degree in Teaching). It can also be a coursework-only qualification undertaken as additional study in a specialisation within one's degree area.

The Diploma, Advanced Diploma and Graduate Diploma are all forms of Degrees, with a Diploma (Level five) qualification, being the entry level for Higher Education.

The "Vocational Graduate Diploma" was a short lived AQF qualification equivalent to the "Graduate Diploma", intended to be delivered exclusively in the VET sector. On 1 January 2015, all such qualifications being offered lost the word "Vocational" from their title.

=== Canada ===
In Ontario, Canada, diplomas are two- and three-year academic post-secondary programmes taught by colleges and institutes of applied studies, arts, and technology. Two-year programmes are referred to as college diplomas, while three-year programmes are called Ontario College Advanced Diplomas. Baccalaureate degrees in Ontario are typically one year longer than an Advanced Diploma and are offered by both colleges and universities. The Canadian school system uses credits to measure the value of a course towards a diploma. To graduate and earn a diploma, the school decides how many credits each course contributes to the overall program requirement. For example, a college course delivered over a 14-week semester typically counts for 3 credits towards the 60 credits required for a complete two-year program.

=== Germany and the German academic education system in Europe ===
In Germany, Ukraine, Serbia, Croatia, Hungary and other countries that adopted the German academic education system, diploma (in German Diplom) is the standard academic degree, needing at least 3.5 years to complete it, being comparable with a bachelor's and master's degree in one.

=== Greece ===
In Greece, diplomas can be awarded by educational institutes as a proof of a certain educational level. The diploma in engineering is a degree provided by Greek technical universities and universities after the successful completion of a five-year integrated study programme and it is equivalent to the Master of Engineering degree, which is awarded by the European universities.

Also in Greece there are the Vocational Training Diploma (Post-Secondary Education EQF 5 level) provided by the National Qualifications and Vocational Guidance Organization (E.O.P.P.E.P.) to the Vocational Training Institutes IEK, following certification exams carried out by the E.O.P.P.E.P.

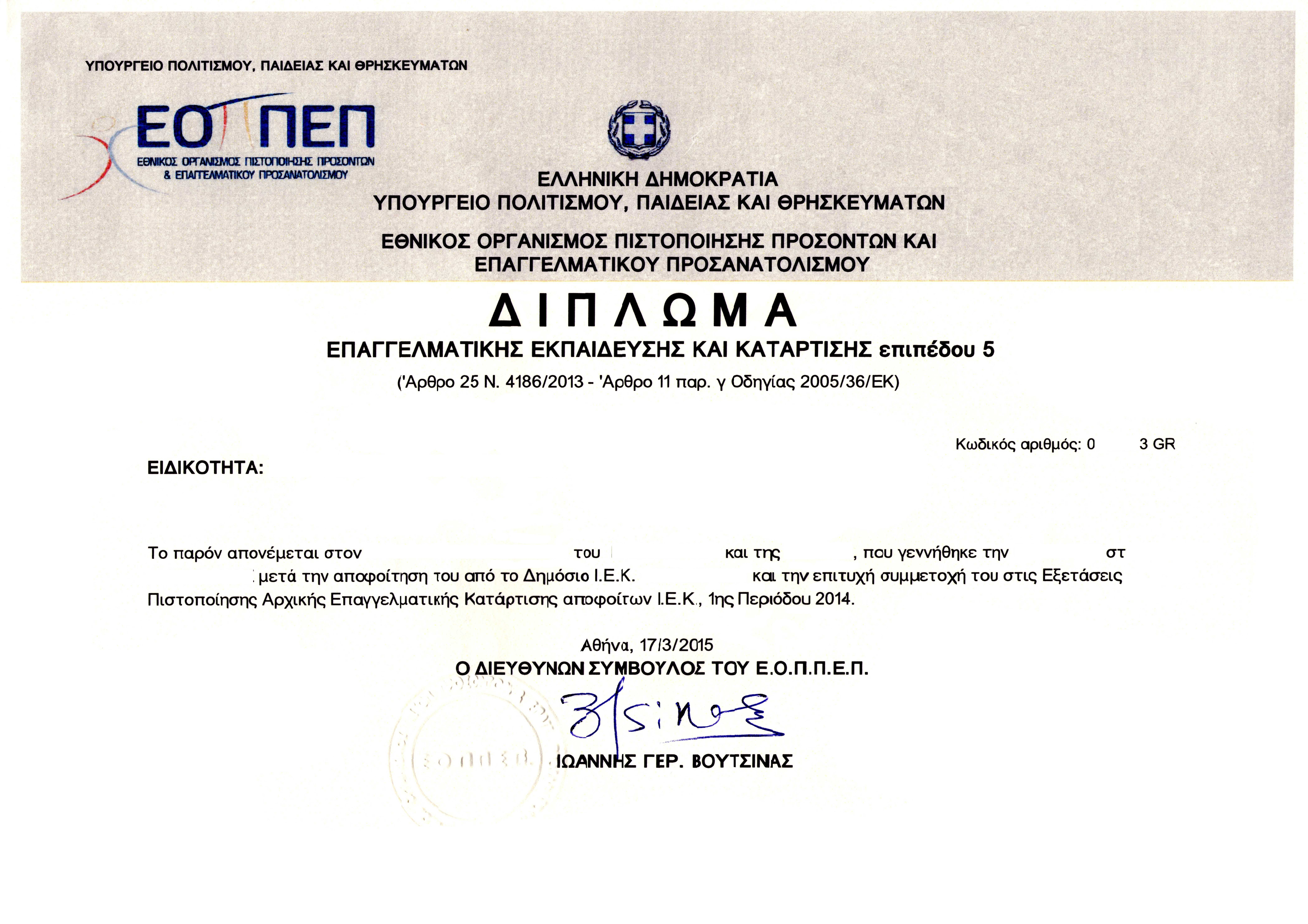
Greek Vocational Training Diploma

=== Hong Kong ===
In Hong Kong, Diploma or Advanced Diploma/Certificate (Qualifications Frameworks Level 4), Professional Diploma/Certificate (Qualifications Frameworks Level 4), higher diploma, and associate degree are below the level of the bachelor's degree.

Certificate (not Post-Graduate Certificate) Qualifications Frameworks Level 3 or below; are below the level of Diploma, Advanced or Professional Diploma/Certificate (Qualifications Frameworks Level 4), Higher Diploma or associate degree.

Postgraduate Certificates and Postgraduate Diplomas are usually granted after the bachelor's degree. It's more vocational oriented than a master's degree.

=== India ===
In India, a diploma is a specific academic award usually earned in professional/vocational courses, e.g., Diploma in Engineering, Diploma in Nursing, Diploma in Pharmacy, Diploma in Radiography (Diagnosis), Diploma in Medical Lab Technology etc. Engineering diplomas are concentrated for the area of study, e.g., diploma in electronics engineering, electrical engineering, civil engineering, computer engineering, etc.

There are two types of diplomas/certificates that are issued in formal and non-formal education sectors: formal diplomas are issued by government-approved/recognized institutions, colleges and universities and non-formal diplomas are issued by NGOs, companies and societies etc. outside the formal education sector.

=== Indonesia ===
In Indonesia, a diploma is a vocational tertiary education award. There are four varieties of Diploma currently recognized by Indonesian National Qualification Framework (Indonesian: Kerangka Kualifikasi Nasional Indonesia, KKNI).

Indonesian diploma
Diploma	Full-time requirement	Credit requirement	Indonesian NQF level	Postnominal title
Diploma Satu	1 year	36	NQF Level 3	Ahli Pratama (A.P.)
Diploma Dua	2 years	72	NQF Level 4	Ahli Muda (A.Ma.)
Diploma Tiga	3 years	108	NQF Level 5	Ahli Madya (A.Md.)
Diploma Empat	4 years	144	NQF Level 6	Sarjana Terapan (S.Tr.)

=== Ireland ===
In the Republic of Ireland, a National Diploma was awarded before 2004. It was at the same level as the ordinary bachelor's degree and below the honours bachelor's degree, whilst the Higher Diploma is taken after the bachelor's degree. There is BTEC Extended Diploma also after which one gets progression to a Degree (University). In Ireland a Graduate Diploma is a Level 9 degree, the equivalent of a master's degree, requiring the student to complete 60 credits instead of 90 and usually centring on the completion of a project rather than a written thesis.

=== Japan ===
In Japan, a diploma may be a Japanese original academic degree or a Certificate of Graduation issued at several levels from elementary school to university.

=== Latin America ===
In Mexico and other Latin American countries, a diploma may be awarded for short courses of vocational training. The university-issued diplomas finalizing higher education are most often called título (title) or certificado (certificate). A "Diplomado" can also be a short, specialized executive education program for experienced professionals.

=== New Zealand ===
In New Zealand, there are five different types of diploma according to the New Zealand Qualifications Framework (NZQF):

- Diploma level 5, which are level 5 qualifications according to the NZQF. They require a minimum of 120 credit points from level 4 or above and 72 from level 5 or above.
- Diploma level 6. They require a minimum of 120 credit points from level 5 or above and 72 from level 6 or above.
- Diploma level 7. They require a minimum of 120 credit points from level 5 or above and 72 from level 7 or above.
- Graduate diploma. To enter a graduate diploma programme a student typically requires another degree (not necessarily a bachelor's degree), or strong evidence of both interest and academic capability. They require a minimum of 120 credit points and 72 from level 7 or above.
- Postgraduate diploma. These degrees require a bachelor's degree to enter them. They require a minimum of 120 credit points from level 7 or above and 72 from level 8 or above.

=== Pakistan ===
In Pakistan, a diploma is a specific academic award usually earned in professional/vocational courses e.g. Diploma in Engineering, Diploma in Nursing, Diploma in Pharmacy etc. Engineering diploma is called Diploma of Associate Engineering (DAE) and is concentrated for the area of study, e.g., Electronics Engineering, Electrical Engineering, Civil Engineering etc. DAE holders are often called associate engineers in Pakistan.

Postgraduate Diploma or PGD are ranked higher than the bachelor's degree as they are completed after graduation. These are normally a year's worth of coursework after a university degree.

=== Singapore ===
In Singapore, most diplomas are awarded after a three-year course, offered by the five polytechnics (Singapore Polytechnic, Ngee Ann Polytechnic, Temasek Polytechnic, Nanyang Polytechnic and Republic Polytechnic) or the two arts institutions (Nanyang Academy of Fine Arts and LASALLE College of the Arts).

Other private schools like Kaplan, SIM, PSB Academy and MDIS, also offer diploma programmes between a period of six months and two years.

=== Spain ===
In the Kingdom of Spain, university diplomas are issued in the name of the King. As such, they are Public Official documents, strictly regulated and protected by the law. They are internationally recognized by the Hague Convention of 5 October 1961.

=== United Kingdom ===
In the UK, diploma can refer to several different types of qualification but is never equivalent to a degree. A degree is higher than a diploma. One can never say that one finished a degree when one is only given a special diploma. A Diploma can be a qualification worth 37 or more credits on the Regulated Qualifications Framework, e.g. Entry Level Diploma, Level 3 Diploma. The Diploma of Higher Education is a higher education award equivalent to the second-year of a bachelor's degree. The Higher National Diploma is a vocational qualification at the same level. A Graduate Diploma is a one-year qualification at bachelor's degree level, normally taken by those who have already obtained a degree. A Postgraduate Diploma is an award at the level of a master's degree, but normally taking less time to complete.

Some universities may offer other qualifications, such as the University of Cambridge's and the University of Oxford's Undergraduate Diploma (a 1-year, part-time course at the same level as a Diploma of Higher Education) and Undergraduate Advanced Diploma. The Undergraduate Advanced Diploma (UGAdvDip) is a FHEQ Level 6 award which is generally accepted as equivalent to a second bachelor's degree or a Graduate Diploma. Undergraduate Advanced Diplomas are only offered at the University of Cambridge and the University of Oxford.

The document certifying the award of a degree is normally called a degree certificate in the UK, and details are printed in English, not in Latin.

==== Undergraduate advanced diploma ====
The advanced diploma (AdvDip) is a FHEQ Level 6 award, equivalent to the final year of a bachelor's degree. They are generally accepted as equivalent to a bachelor's degree or a Graduate Diploma. An advanced diploma is a qualification that prepares students to enter into a specific career or further study in an advanced degree, like a Master of Arts. Even though they are considered equivalent to a bachelor's degree they usually have a duration of one or two years and they can be offered both on a full-time and a part-time basis.

=== United States ===
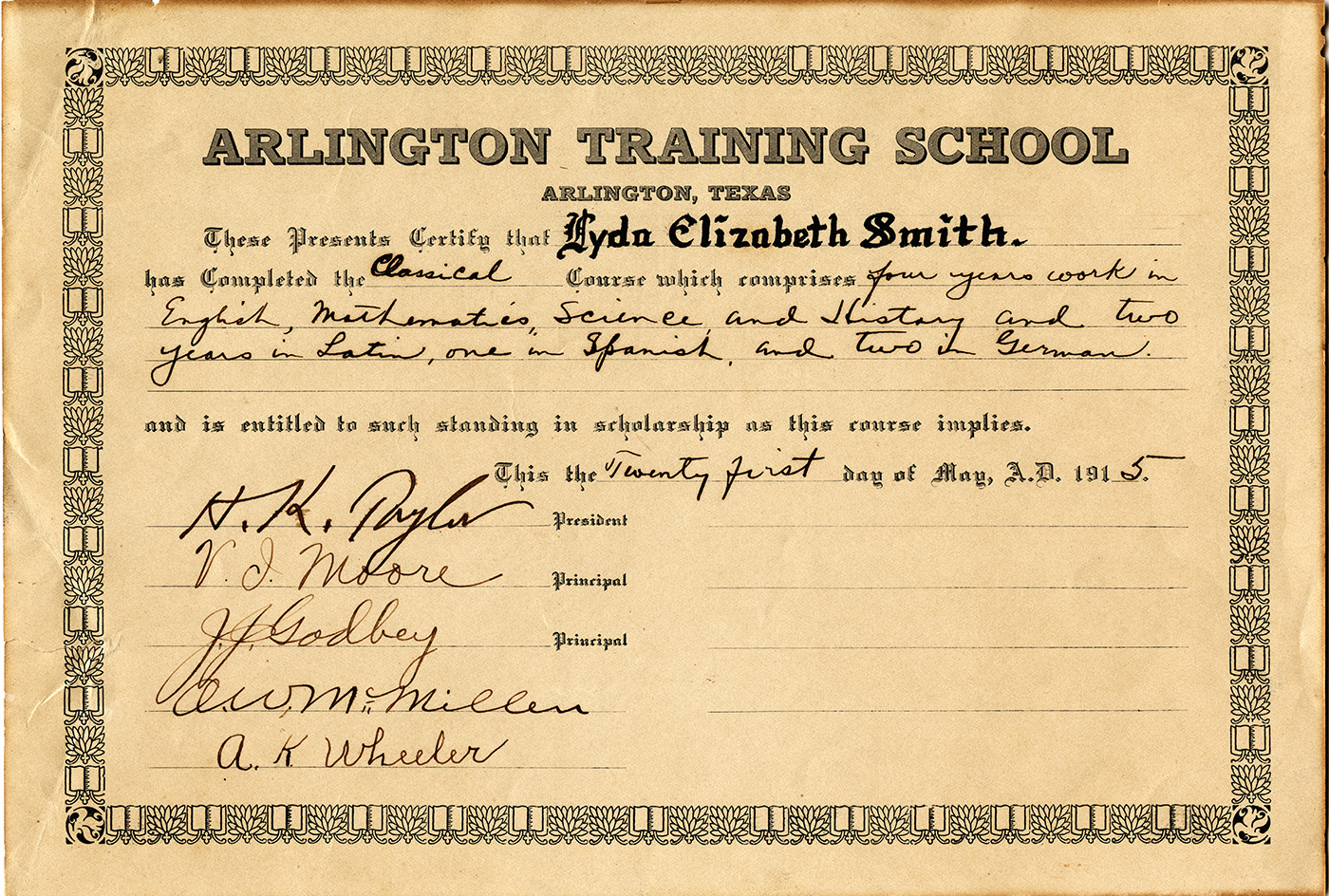
1915 Arlington Training School diploma

In the United States, the word diploma usually refers to the physical document, especially in the context of academic degrees earned at the college or university level. That is, Americans normally draw a distinction between a diploma as documentary evidence of the award of an academic degree, and the underlying degree itself, which is not called a diploma.

The reason this distinction matters is that many American universities do not print diplomas until several weeks or months after the dates on which graduates were formally awarded their degrees on their academic transcripts. In other words, when a diploma says on its face that so-and-so degree was "given at [city] on [date]", the diploma itself was not physically handed to the holder on that date. (For ceremonial purposes, the documents handed out at graduation are simply certificates of participation in the graduation ceremony itself.) Thus, asking alumni when they received their diplomas is usually pointless; what really matters for most purposes (e.g., occupational licensing) is when they received their degrees. This important distinction can lead to some confusion when persons who obtained degrees at American universities are presenting their academic credentials in other countries.

Diplomas written in Latin, such as this bachelor's degree from Georgetown University, were once a tradition in American academia but have become the exception today

There are two major exceptions where Americans have merged the document with the qualification it represents (as seen in other countries). The first is the high school diploma. Second, the term "diploma" can refer to a specific academic or training award. For example, the Diploma in Nursing was offered by hospital-based nursing schools.

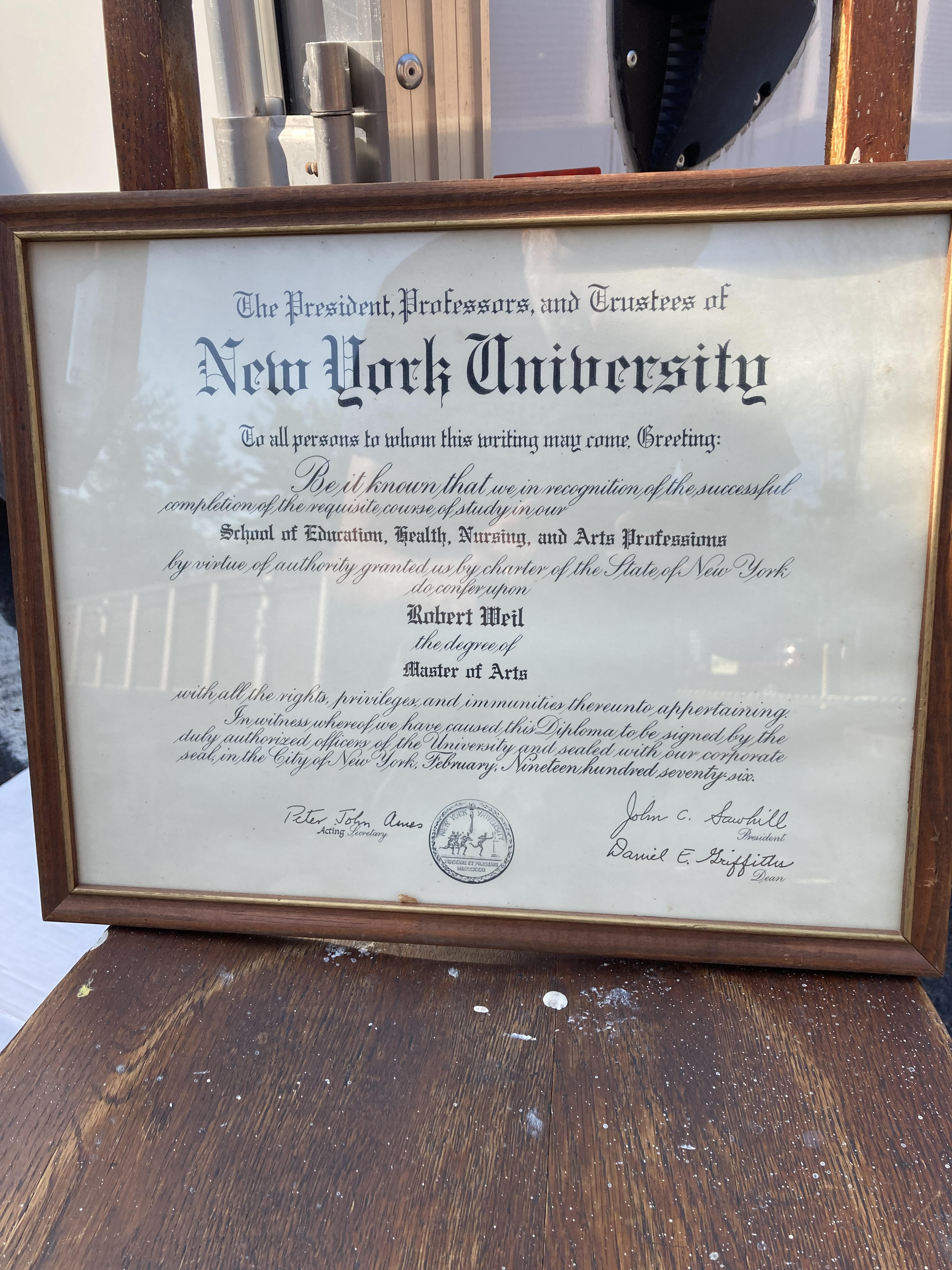
Today most U.S. college diplomas, such as this master's degree from New York University, are written in English

Historically, American universities emulated their European counterparts by issuing diplomas written in the Latin language. That is now the exception today: "While most colleges and universities now issue English diplomas, some prominent holdouts" "still use Latin", including Yale University, Princeton University, Georgetown University, Boston College, the University of Pennsylvania.

At Harvard University, undergraduate degrees began to be written in English in 1961, leading to a street protest by students known as the "Diploma Riots". However, as of 2021, some Harvard graduate schools continue to issue degrees in Latin, including Harvard Law School and the Harvard Graduate School of Arts and Sciences.

Meanwhile, at Columbia University, undergraduate degrees from Columbia College, Barnard College and the School of General Studies are written in Latin, while those from the School of Engineering & Applied Sciences are written in English; all graduate degrees conferred by Columbia are also written in English, except those issued by Columbia Law School. There was previous long-standing protests by students of the School of General Studies and the General Studies Student Council, who advocated for being conferred the same Latin diploma as those given to graduates of Columbia College. Since the graduating class of 2024, Columbia University begins issuing Latin diplomas for graduates of the School of General Studies.

The term diplomate (always ending with an e) is used in the United States to refer to a person holding a specialized certification in a professional field, although the documentary evidence of this is traditionally called a "certificate" and not a "diploma". For example, board-certified physicians in the United States traditionally indicate their board-certified status on their letterhead and business cards with the title "Diplomate", a comma, and then the name of their certifying board.

=== Iran ===
To get a diploma in Iranian schools, one must first complete 6 years of elementary school, followed by 3 years of middle school and 3 years of high school. After completing these 12 years of education, students are awarded a diploma based on their chosen field of study.

=== International ===
The International Baccalaureate (IB) Diploma is a pre-university qualification normally taken by students in the final two years of high school.

The International Qualifications Network (IQN) awards a number of diploma programmes which are accredited under the Scottish Credit & Qualifications Framework (SCQF)

Pearson Qualifications (BTEC) offer a number HND – Higher National Diploma programmes globally.

== See also ==
- Bologna process
- Certificate (disambiguation)
- Diploma thesis
- Diploma de Estudios Avanzados
- Diploma mill
- Diploma of Biblical Studies
- Diploma of Education
- Diploma of Imperial College
- Diploma of Journalism
- Diploma in Computer Science
- Diploma in Engineering
- Educational accreditation
- High school diploma
- Maturity diploma
- Postgraduate Diploma in Education
- Professional Graduate Diploma in Education
