= Graham Budgett =

British-American conceptual artist

- Born: 1954 (age 71–72); Manchester, United Kingdom
- Education: Stanford University, St. Martin's School of Art, Trent Polytechnic
- Known for: New media art, spatial practices, installation art, photography, sculpture
- Style: Interdisciplinary, digital, site-specific
- Spouse: Jane Mulfinger
- Awards: Microsoft Research Grant, British Council, Artangel Trust
- Website: Graham Budgett

Graham Budgett is a British-American conceptual artist and educator whose socio-politically engaged work includes photography, sculpture, installation, spatial practices and new media art. Budgett explores systems of image production and display, the discourse of media and capitalism, human subjectivity, and the interaction between theory and practice. His work has been exhibited at Tate Gallery, Victoria and Albert Museum, Beaconsfield, Centre for Contemporary Arts (Glasgow), Alvar Aalto Museum (Finland), Ars Electronica, and Santa Barbara Museum of Art. It has been reviewed in The Times (London), The Guardian, The Observer, The Face, and Time Out.

Graham Budgett, Devil in the Details, Vernacular English and WebGL-based interactive audiovisual (still image), 2014.

Critics such as Adrian Searle describe Budgett's earlier photographic images as "tragic dystopias" recalling the social criticism of Walter Benjamin, George Grosz, Jorge Luis Borges, and Wim Wenders; his later work explores the construction of identity, public space and artwork through transitory installations, public projects and digital and code-born new-media that largely function outside the art market.

Budgett has been based in Berlin, London and the United States and has taught at University of Westminster and the University of California, Santa Barbara. He is married to artist Jane Mulfinger and lives and works in Santa Barbara.

== Life and career ==
Budgett was born in Manchester, United Kingdom in 1954 and studied sculpture at Trent Polytechnic (BA, Fine Arts, 1977) and St. Martin's School of Art (advanced diploma, 1978). He continued his studies at Stanford University in California (MFA, 1981), where his work became more politicized during the era of Reaganism and Thatcherism. After concluding at Stanford, he taught sculpture at the University of California, Santa Barbara (UCSB) and produced humorous, politically charged assemblages, whose recontextualized manufactured products played associative games and punctured cultural pretensions.

In the mid-1980s, Budgett moved with Jane Mulfinger to Berlin, where both became friends with Edward and Nancy Reddin Kienholz and Budgett received a residency at the Kunstlerhaus Bethanien (1986–7); while there he gained attention for the photomontage work "Berlin bei Nacht" (Berlin by Night). From 1988–94, he lived in London, exhibiting at venues such as The Photographers' Gallery, Watershed Media Centre and Camerawork, and teaching at the University of Westminster and Middlesex University.

After moving back to the United States in 1994, Budgett served in several capacities in the Department of Art at UCSB over two decades, including lecturer in New Media and Acting Head of Digital Media Media, before retiring in 2015. He has largely sought to publish and exhibit his later work in public spaces, including the Web, in addition to exhibition venues such as the Trondheim Art Museum, Santa Barbara Museum of Art, and Beaconsfield.

== Work and reception ==
Budgett has worked in a wide range of media, producing work united by concerns with image production and display, sociopolitical critique, human subjectivity and identity, public space, and the melding of theory and practice. He began his career as a sculptor, initially producing large, minimalist constructions, installations and architectural interventions, before turning to readymade assemblages. He shifted to image and text works in the mid-1980s, influenced by the critical photomontages of Dada and John Heartfield's anti-Nazi works while seeking a more accessible medium with reach beyond galleries to public space. In the latter half of his career, he has divided his efforts between new media, installations and public artworks.

Graham Budgett, The [Zoo] Logical Garden, "Berlin bei Nacht" series, photomontage, 1987.

=== Pre-digital image & text works ===
Budgett's early pre-digital photomontages have been described as "amalgamations of image and performance in front of the camera." They draw on appropriated sources—which he altered and blended in-camera with live models, props and sculpture, text and his own photographs—and the bright colors, gloss and fantasy of advertising aesthetics; the juxtaposition of recognizable, inviting visuals, darker stories and critiques of political myths and consumer capitalism create an intentional shock or defamiliarization effect to provoke viewers. Budgett ultimately judged as too alienating early work such as "A Brief US History" (1985), a series featuring iconoclastic, caustic montages and text that unequivocally counter official narratives on topics such as foreign interference by the CIA, atomic testing in the South Pacific, abortion and the Ku Klux Klan.

For "Berlin by Night" (1987), he took a more open-ended approach, creating text, glossy Cibachrome prints, and a boxed set of "tourist" postcards depicting scenarios at famed sites that critically engaged Berlin's 750th anniversary. Individual works such as [Zoo] Logical Garden and The Void featured fig-leafed, fleeing Adam and Eve figures and a diving man frozen above the liminal space of the Berlin wall; in The Angel of History (a play on Paul Klee's Angelus Novus), an angel is propelled backwards by the force of a catastrophic atomic-like blast. Writers describe the urban-scapes as confrontations with "the unholy communion of entertainment and self-destruction" that recall the haunted visions of Bosch, George Grosz and Walter Benjamin.

Graham Budgett, Eusopia, "Visible Cities" series, blue-toned silver-print, 60" x 42", 1992.

In his Lost Charms series (1992), Budgett combines words ("Prescience," "Sensibility") and large diptychs pairing found/recovered objects (a crumpled engagement ring, an extracted tooth) with common advertising motifs to trigger a dialogue lamenting irrevocably changed values or, in critic Sarah Kent's words, "the loss of innocence in a media-saturated society" focused on stimulating appetites. He created the blue-toned silver prints of Visible Cities (1992) in the wake of Berlin's reunification, blending images of the city with three-dimensional constructions of plastic consumer goods and text that merge space and commodity; reviewers such as Time Out's Adrian Searle call the series an unreal, fragmented "city of the mind" alluding to "the terror and ironies of our social aspirations" and recalling the dystopic meditations of Wim Wenders, Borges, and Atget.

The show "Them That Trespass" (1996) heralded Budgett's shift toward exploring the paradoxes and opportunities of digital imagemaking. He appropriated small, Sunday-paper color ads for show homes, then digitally enlarged and bubble-jet printed them to achieve what Sarah Kent calls "the hazy, chocolate-box beauty of impressionist paintings." Superimposed, hand-lettered text that overran the images onto gallery walls—and suggest aggressive fantasies, vandalism, and rebellion against dispossession, bourgeois conformity and property—undercut the picturesque visuals and speak to a recession's destabilization of home ownership at the time.

=== Digital and code-born works ===
Much of Budgett's post-1995 output is focused on online, often transitory, digital and code-born work. Several projects focus on the human face, as a representation of the psyche and identity or site of human engineering. "Surfacing the Soul: a Visiognomy of Ignominy" (1996) digitally hybridized actual and mediated portraits to examine the media-influenced nature of expressions and critique the notion of portraiture as a "window to the soul"; AURORA (2003) and Imaging the Metahuman (2012) explore applications to iterate composite representations of diversity.

In several series, Budgett used probabilistic (as opposed to deterministic) algorithms, which reinterpret object, form and color inputs to create iterative, transitory digital "paintings" and audiovisual works. His "Ideas for Painting" project (2008–13) features series engines based on art-historical abstract-painting influences; they include: Sketches toward a fresh NEO-GEO canvas every 5 seconds for the duration of Western culture (2008); AROTHKOBOT (2013), which generates works reminiscent of Rothko color-field paintings; and way2go (2010), which produces an evolving Op art-like work.

Graham Budgett, Weltanschauung: an installed view, installation, 1998, Trondheim Art Museum, Norway.

Three visualization engines created in 2012 offer diverse bodies of work: Prosaic Memories of the Space Age produces fractal-like, gray monochrome liminal spatializations; Tossing the Drachma uses mythological pictograms and icons to form unique typographical constellations; and 6turnsout2B9 recodes 3D renderings of well-known architectural structures and cathedrals into idiosyncratic, warped spaces. The interactive audiovisual works an occult dimension (2013) and God, the Devil in the Detail (2014) combine music, psychedelic imagery and commercial animation that viewers can alter with a cursor.

=== Installations and time and space works ===
In addition to his image-based work, Budgett has frequently created time and space works that explore public versus private realms and human subjectivity, beginning with large-scale minimal constructions and installations in the late 1970s and continuing four decades into the present. His commissioned temporary public work A Social Outing (1991) reflected on the ordering of public space as "nature" intended for consumption by arranging ninety-one red cedar picnic tables into a 36-foot square by 18-foot pyramid. The inIVA-commissioned installation Grey Area (1995, with Jane Mulfinger) consisted of a boxing ring-sized, memorial-like, grey Plasticine square listing boxing champions; the names were gradually obliterated by the footsteps of visitors, echoing their erosion in public memory over time and offering a stark reminder of the fleeting nature of fame.

Jane Mulfinger & Graham Budgett, Regrets (detail), interactive archive, public conceptual artwork, action-research study, 2005–2008. Cambridge, UK, 2005 (left), Paris, France, 2008 (right). Additional stagings in Linz, Austria (2006), Santa Barbara, California (2008).

Three site-specific installations reflected on the passing of time, changing architecture and urban-scapes, light, and surveillance by using video projection, sculptural elements and architectural interventions. Weltanschauung (Trondheim Art Museum, 1990) projected panoramic, rotating views of a displaced exterior—not its Norwegian surroundings, but the distant Potsdamer Platz in Berlin—around a space centered by a circular bench and column. Hanbury Terrain (2005, with Mulfinger) explored a single intersection in London's East End, combining projected images of present-day street activity, etchings on glass of historical maps, and a sculptural object representing plans for future displacement. Windauge (Anglo-Saxon for "wind-eye" or "window"; 2016, with Mulfinger) used a small circular window high on a back wall of Beaconsfield Gallery as a camera obscura whose long-neglected view of the surrounding neighborhood was projected onto the floor.

In 2005, Budgett and Mulfinger received funding from Microsoft Research Cambridge for the action-research project REGRETS (2005–8), which comprised a public conceptual artwork, interactive archive and study of human regret as a positive entity and tool of self-correction. The street project featured a private kiosk/"confessional" and five roaming custom backpack input/display units with computers that suggested the metaphor of offloading one's burdens (regrets) onto the back of another; they connected to a central database that reciprocated participants with five algorithm-determined, similar regrets in a show of solidarity. REGRETS was staged in Cambridge, Linz, Santa Barbara, and Paris; Circa magazine called it "an intriguing exercise in social psychology" while The Guardian described it as "surprisingly poetic."

== Awards and recognition ==
Budgett has been awarded a Microsoft Research Grant (Cambridge, 2005); commissions from the Santa Barbara Museum of Art (2009), Contemporary Arts Forum (2000), Iniva (1995), Artangel Trust, Projects UK, and the National Garden Festival (all 1990); and artist-in-residencies from Beaconsfield (2016) and Kunstlerhaus Bethanien (1986–7). His work belongs to the public art collections of the Victoria & Albert Museum, Alvar Aalto Museum (Finland) and Deutsche Bank London, and has appeared in the books Art contemporain nouveaux médias (2011), The Wireless Spectrum (2010), Hiding in the Light by Dick Hebdige (1988), and Ghost Photography (1989), among others.
