= Diploma in Computer Science =

The Diploma in Computer Science is a diploma offered by several post-secondary institutions:

- Cambridge Diploma in Computer Science – this University of Cambridge course was the world's first computer science course, first offered in 1953
- University of Kent in Canterbury
- University of British Columbia

The diploma is also provided in various other universities all around the world.

== History, Definition ==
Computer Science is a major or specific interest that students can take at college and university level. Nearly each undergraduate institution in the United States provides a computer science major, and more than 100 colleges offer computer science PhD programmes. Numerous new institutions have been established in Egypt to provide a specialization in computer sciences and information systems. In 2001, the existing system for collegiate computer science majors was published. All computer science major programmes should cover the following 'fundamental' disciplines in 13 different areas, it includes: algorithms and complexity, architecture, discrete structures, HCI, information management, intelligent systems, net-centric computing, and many more, according to research done by Mahmoud M. El-Khouly in 2007. The study of computers and computational systems is known as computer science. Computer scientists work primarily with software and software systems, including their theory, design, development, and implementation. Logic, more than any other branch of mathematics, is becoming increasingly important in computer technology. However, we feel that the new applications necessitate fresh breakthroughs in logic itself. The traditional generalisations of first-order predicate calculus are insufficient to support the new applications. New developments, on the other hand, will most likely build on previous logic triumphs.

Graduate diplomas are currently widespread in New Zealand's higher education institutions based on Dr Theresa McLennan's data. For instance, the Graduate Diploma in Applied Computing at Lincoln University was established in 1999 to provide a pathway into a computing job for those who already have a bachelor's degree in another field.

Computer science is a form of a distinctive and compelling mixture that includes science, engineering, and mathematics. Experimental algorithms, experimental computer science, and computational science are examples of Computer Science operations that are largely science. Design, development, software engineering, and computer engineering are examples of engineering-based jobs. Computational complexity, mathematical software, and numerical analysis are examples of pure mathematics. The majority, however, are combinations. All three events are based on the same principles. Instead of saying "computer science, mathematics, and engineering," scientists and individuals used the phrase "computing" in 1989. Computing science, engineering, mathematics, art, and their various combinations are now collectively referred to as "computer science."

The scientific perspective is abundant and prominent in computing research. Cognition experts, for one, believe that information processing in the brain and nervous system are responsible for much intelligent behaviour; they construct systems that simulate these processes and compare them to the real event. In this research, the computers are used to examine the theory; effective programs can be installed right away. Scientists in software engineering develop concepts for how coding is done and how errors occur and then experiment with these ideas to understand which ones work best and how to apply them to develop better programmes with fewer flaws.

== Majors ==
Computer Science is a broad scope of interests, it varies extensively as years pass by. Different institution offers different variety of majors. Algorithms is one of the major options, it studies the breakdown of algorithms, graph procedures, and computability theory. Architecture specialization in Computer Science involves digital logic and systems, it plays with data and computer language. This specialization highlights IT modules such as input and outputs, CPU, networks, and memory structures. Furthermore, Computer Science also offers Human-Computer Interaction (HCI) as a specialization as it teaches the fundamentals, as well as building a graphical user interface, and its aspects. Information Management major learns about Computer Science dominantly on databases which include fundamentals of the system, data modeling, query languages, and data mining

Intelligent Systems is another major that Computer Science offers that studies essential matters of IT, examination and optimisation, processing machines, and robotics. A new one is Net-centric Computing which studies network security, data compression, multimedia, and mobile computing. A most common one among peers is Programming, this is where students learn various code languages and implement those languages for algorithms and problem-solving. Coding languages can be translated as well and typed into various systems. In addition, Software Engineering is another frequent option amongst students. This specialization uses metrics and specifications to perform and design the goal and strategy of IT bases.

With a wide variety of majors, it differs in its complexity. The research was found regarding the high attrition rate of students enrolling in Computer Science. Students leave, resign, or relocate to another university for a variety of reasons. Then again, these factors contribute to attrition in any significant corporation. Close relationships, health problems, financial difficulties, military duty, or having a work-life outside of education may all be factors. Nonetheless, other variables can also influence computer science preservation. Numerous schools have recorded drop rates of up to 40%, which is quickly fitting the standard for computer science degrees. The first factor may be faculty members of previous schools or in college, who are executing poor counseling.

Counselors, parents, and students themselves have a skewed perception of students’ abilities to the point where they are often encouraged and pushed into a computer science degree. These students tend to be underprepared to start college in this major with low expectations of the complexity and involvedness in computer science. An example of their low expectation may be the bare minimum of math and science classes they take. As a result, they can misunderstand the major due to a lack of preparation.

Another factor is a lack of mathematics skills. While mathematics is such an important aspect of computer science, students must master it to prep for a computer science major. Students who are proficient in mathematics are more likely to excel in computer science. They are more capable of comprehending data linkages, analytical procedures, and algorithm creation. This enables them to be more effective and swifter at solving challenges and creating good designs. However, students who have low mathematical skills may also learn and take study lessons an inch further than those ones who already excel at it.

"CS = problem solving” is a famous and meaningful quote by Donald Knuth. Tutors and lecturers spend a hefty amount of time teaching students how to solve problems using technology and its software. However, because fundamental problem solving is a requirement for CS1 (Introductory Computer Science), it is out of the range of the course to demonstrate it. Teachers disregarding to teach these essential skills will almost certainly have an outcome of a larger number of students dropping out of the class, worsening the extraordinary drop rates issue. Another common issue in large universities is having a graduate student as a teacher. Even though every computer science graduate student has the technical expertise to instruct the class, that graduate student may be entirely unqualified to speak in front of a class, especially if a language barrier is involved. With the number of surveys and researches taken, the investigation paper concluded by Theresa Beaubouef and John Mason, the Department of Computer Science in Southeastern Louisiana University suggests that having a graduate student as a teacher can address the impression to pupils that they are inconsiderable and less significant and in addition with the stress of a strenuous major, it can be greatly for students to bear.

== Employment ==
According to research interviews done by Dr Theresa McLennan, the employment rate for diplomas in Computer Science was significant as the vast majority of them were employed on a long-term basis. Four of them were on short-term contracts, and one was volunteering. A majority of them continued to work for the firm where they had gone after leaving the university. Two of them had successfully made the transition from computing to higher-paying careers in other fields. Half of the graduates were hired locally in software development occupations ranging from developing, building, and testing embedded devices to implementing web-based database applications.

Another study of a new estimate released by the World Economic Forum (WEF), which held its annual gathering in Davis' Swiss ski resort, factories, and hospitals, robots will take over 5.1 million office positions during the next five years. According to a study of young employees in Western countries, they believe that relying solely on their education will not allow them to execute their professions well because their credentials do not qualify them to do so. In Europe, the skills gap amongst people and machines is most noticeable. Based on the research, roughly 80% of respondents believe that learning advanced technological skills outside of the school curriculum is critical to keeping up with robotics breakthroughs.

A number of jobs are at stake in the fourth industrial revolution: as reported by data of future jobs, computers will have a significant impact on each industry, and jobs have may have a chance of decreasing. Concurrently, demand for specialised and skilled personnel, such as data analysts and computer scientists, will be at an all-time high. According to the paper, the technological transformation will put women's careers in jeopardy because the majority of women's jobs are low-growth, sales, or administrative positions. Throughout the last 40 years, technology and robotization have changed the industrial economy, and increased production while simultaneously increasing unemployment.

In the course of a panel gathering on 'Is Any Job Truly Safe?' at the McKinsey Global Institute, partner Michael Chui argued that robots perform supremacy and distinction line of work with reduced failure rates. Nonetheless, it has the potential to reduce the quantity of workers. Over than 700 presenters said that the technological breakthrough had eliminated low-wage, low-skill occupations.

== Prevailing Problem in Computer Science ==
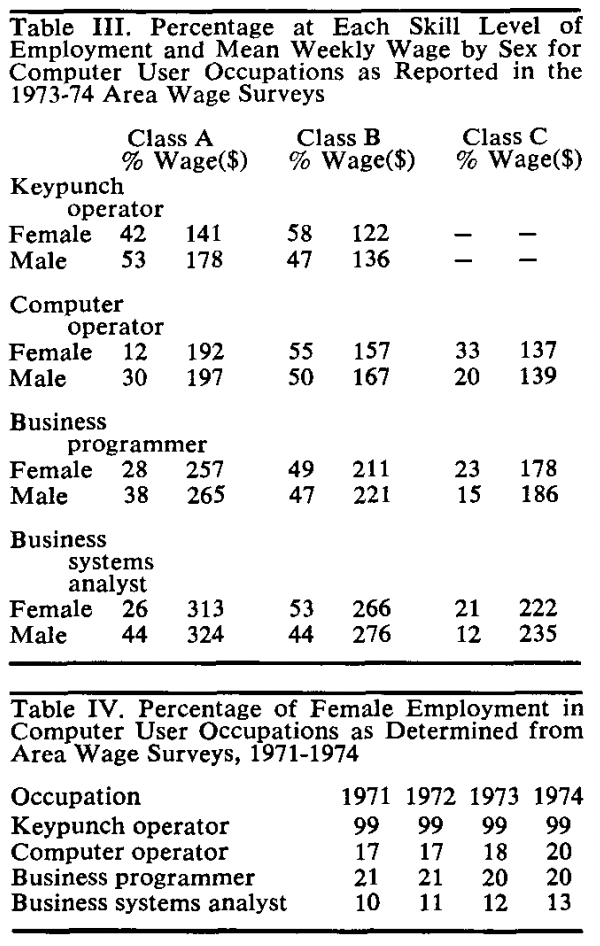
Data regarding discrimination of employment against women in STEM based on Richard Weber and Bruce Gilchrist's findings

A study published in 1975 by Richard Weber from Rutgers University and Bruce Gilchrist from Columbia University explained discrimination against women in the computer industry. The U.S. Department of Labor produces employment data for several industries every month and in this survey, the researchers focused on the employment data for manufacturers of electronic computer equipment. According to the data, the percentage of women engaged in the manufacture of electronic computer equipment remained about 27% from 1967 to 1972, before increasing to 31% in 1974. In contrast, the percentage of women in the entire citizen workforce improved from 36 percent in 1967 to 39 percent in 1974. As a result, while remaining beneath the nationwide average, the percentage of women employed by electronic computer equipment makers is improving significantly.

Despite the fact that women make up around 39% of the workforce in the United States, they only make up about 31% of computer manufacturing jobs, and they only make up about 20% of computer-user jobs (with the exception of the lowest-paid group of keypunch operators). Furthermore, women are more likely to be engaged in computer-user professions with lesser qualifications, among each sector, they are recruited at lower skill levels. Lastly, women are paid less on average than men in each profession and competence area.

In fact, a scarcity of qualified workers does not justify compensation disparities between skill levels. The latter findings can be interpreted in one of two ways, or both, which is that there would be less women with years of understanding and experience equivalent to males if either the percentage of women in computer-user occupations was originally much lower than that of men or the turnover rate for women employees was significantly greater than that of men. Both hypotheses can rationalise the observed wage disparity because wage normally correlates to decades of work expertise in the profession. A comparison of women's age and pay profiles to males' could reveal if either or both of these theories are correct.

== Computer Ethics ==
From trade and business to governance, studies, education, medical, information, and entertainment systems, computers, and technical applications are increasingly important to many sectors of people and culture. Computer scientists and experts within relevant fields who develop and construct application software bear a significant amount of authority since the systems they create can have far-reaching effects on society.

"The investigation of the society and natural impact of computer technology, and the related creation and rationalization of policies for the ethical use of such technology" is how computer ethics is defined. Computer Science is a comparatively recent and continually developing field. Moreover, the moral issues that Computer Scientists encounter are frequently more intricate than those other professions face. The traditional ethical research papers in engineering education, for example, portray the damage of life or harm as a consequence of principled failures in these fields. The failure of this unethical behavior could be taken from the Ford Pinto fire or the Kansas City Hyatt walkaway collapse, based on Stavrakakis's findings. Some systems implemented by Computer Scientists should be acknowledged by all factors, therefore, botches and malfunctions like these can be eliminated.

Based on research conducted by Stavrakaki and his team, he brought on 61 countries as the research's demographics. Academic institutions that do not educate computer ethics in their Computer Science (and related) programmes provided a total of 22 replies from 61 nations. Merely one comment came from an institution that concentrates on technical courses, whereas 21 came from universities that educate all academic subject areas. Nearly a third (7 out of 22) of the replies in our database came from Italian institutions. As a result of the disproportionate representation, Jackknife resampling was used to quantify the sample bias, but no significant influence was discovered. The remaining institutions were dispersed throughout Europe.

With this research, 63% of the participants believe that learning computer ethics is essential for Computer Science in academic institutions that do not teach it. The participants cited a variety of arguments for why computer ethics should be taught. The most popular response was the ever-increasing importance of computers on society, which would have been stated by over majority of the respondents. Regarding the matter delivery, certain respondents believed computer ethics should be taught as an optional module, while others thought it should be taught as part of existing curriculum.
