= Härenstam =

Härenstam is a surname. Notable people with the surname include:

- Magnus Härenstam, Swedish actor
- Mattias Härenstam (born 1971), Swedish artist
