= John Wynne =

John Wynne may refer to:

- John Wynne (bishop) (c. 1666–1743), Bishop of St Asaph 1715–27, of Bath and Wells 1727–43, Principal of Jesus College Oxford 1712–20
- John Wynne (cricketer) 1819–1893) was an English cricketer and clergyman
- John Wynne (footballer) (born 1947), Australian rules footballer
- John Wynne (industrialist) (1650–1714), Welsh industrialist
- John Wynne (died 1689) (c. 1630–1689), MP for Denbighshire 1664–79
- John Wynne (1689–1718), MP for Denbigh Boroughs 1713–15
- John Wynne (died 1747) (c. 1690–1747), MP for Castlebar 1727-47
- John Wynne (1720–1778), Irish politician, MP for Leitrim 1761–68, for Sligo Borough 1751–60 and 1768–76
- John Arthur Wynne (1801–1865), Irish landowner and politician, MP for Sligo Borough 1830–32, 1856–57, 1857–60
- John Wynne (sound artist) (born 1957)
- John Wynne (ice hockey) (born 1971), Canadian player for several teams and leagues
- John Stewart Wynne, American writer
- John J. Wynne, American Jesuit priest, writer and editor

== See also ==
- John Wynn (disambiguation)
- Jon Wynne-Tyson (born 1924), British author
