= Kawartha Lakes Bible College =

Defunct Canadian bible school (1973–2005)

Coordinates: 44.2709849°N 78.3900065°W

- Type: Evangelical Bible College
- Active: 1973–2005
- Address: 2225 Lansdowne St W, Peterborough, Ontario, Canada
- Affiliations: Non-denominational

Kawartha Lakes Bible College (KLBC) is a defunct evangelical Bible college that was located in Peterborough, Ontario from 1973 to 2005. By 2007, the small site had become a detoxification centre, and by 2021, it had become a clinic providing mental health services to the military, health care providers, and first responder personnel.

== History ==
KLBC was founded as Kawartha Lakes Bible School (KLBS) in 1973, which offered night classes in intensive biblical studies. In 1977, KLBS began operating as a full-time day school located at Edmison Heights Bible Chapel. Beginning in 1994, a second year program was started.

KLBC closed in 2005. Emmaus University has undertaken the responsibility of hosting the academic records and transcripts for Kawartha Lakes Bible College.

== Academics ==
KLBC offered a one-year Diploma of Biblical Studies program and a two-year Diploma of Advanced Biblical Studies program. Students in these programs received approximately 550 hours of Bible training.

- 17 Bible/ Theology Courses were offered. - 18 General/ Practical Courses were offered.

Kawartha Lakes Bible College was not an accredited degree-granting school, but it was recognized as an educational institution by the Government of Canada.

The college was recognized by the International Council for Evangelical Theological Education and by the Canadian Council of Christian Charities.
