= Jane Rendell =

Emirati historian and writer

- Born: 1967 (age 58–59); Dubai, United Arab Emirates
- Known for: Critical spatial practice; feminist architectural theory; art and architecture writing
- Title: Professor of Architecture and Art

Academic background
- Education: University of Sheffield (BA Hons); University of Edinburgh (DipArch); University College London (MSc); Birkbeck, University of London (PhD)
- Thesis: The Pursuit of Pleasure: Architecture in London 1821–8 (1998)
- Doctoral advisor: Lynda Nead

Academic work
- Discipline: Architecture, Art, Feminism
- Institutions: Bartlett School of Architecture, University College London
- Notable works: Art and Architecture: A Place Between; Site-Writing: The Architecture of Art Criticism

Jane Rendell (born Dubai, UAE in 1967) is an architectural historian, cultural critic and art writer. She has taught at Chelsea College of Art and Design, Winchester School of Art, and the University of Nottingham. She has been based at the Bartlett School of Architecture at UCL since 2000, where she has been Professor of Architecture and Art since 2008, teaching primarily across the Situated Practice, Architectural History and PhD programmes. She was Director of Architectural Research (2004–10) and Vice Dean Research (2010-3). She is currently Director of Architectural History and Theory and leads the Bartlett’s Ethics Commission.

Rendell obtained her BA (Hons) Architecture from the University of Sheffield in 1988, and her DipArch, University of Edinburgh in 1992, and practiced as an architectural designer with Anthony Richardson and Partners, and the feminist architectural co-operative, Matrix. She obtained her MSc in The History of Modern Architecture from UCL in 1994 and her PhD, ‘The Pursuit of Pleasure: Architecture in London 1821–8’, from Birkbeck College, University of London in 1998, supervised by Professor Lynda Nead.

== Work ==
Rendell’s research, writing and teaching is transdisciplinary and crosses architecture, art, feminism, history and psychoanalysis. Her co-edited collections all explore different intersections between architecture and other disciplines, from those with an urban focus such Strangely Familiar (1996) and The Unknown City (2001), to those with a particular interest in architectural history, such as Gender, Space, Architecture (1999) and Intersections (2000), to those which examine the critical inflexions of art and architectural practice, such as A Place Between (1999), Spatial Imagination (2005), Pattern (2007) and Critical Architecture (2007).

Her first authored book drew on feminist theory to explore the methodologies of architectural history, through an examination of rambling, as a pursuit of urban pleasure in 1820s London. In her subsequent book, Art and Architecture: A Place Between, she introduced the term ‘critical spatial practice’ to investigate ‘the specifically spatial aspects of interdisciplinary processes or practices that operate between art and architecture’, and in Site-Writing she goes on to argue that criticism is itself a form of critical spatial practice. In The Architecture of Psychoanalysis she re-examines places between but this time in terms of transitional spaces, specifically those of the setting in psychoanalysis, and the history of the social condenser in architecture.

Her most recent research engages with acts of displacement, related to the extractive industries, and to the London housing crisis and the displacement of tenants and leaseholders as a result of regeneration schemes specifically in Southwark. Her publications on these topics include ‘Giving an Account of Oneself, Architecturally’, the Journal of Visual Culture; ‘Critical Spatial Practice as Parrhesia’, special issue of MaHKUscript, Journal of Fine Art Research; co-edited with Michal Murawski, Reactivating the Social Condenser, a special issue of The Journal of Architecture (forthcoming 2017), and the fictionella, Silver (2017) for Lost Rocks (2017–2021) A Published Event.

Rendell writes critical essays for artists, such as Daniel Arsham, Bik Van Der Pol, Jessie Brennan, Janet Hodgson, Jasmina Cibic, Apollonia Susteric and transparadiso, and for galleries and museums such as FRAC Centre, Orléans; Hamburger Bahnhof, Berlin; and the Hayward Gallery, London, and gives talks for arts agencies, events and galleries such as the Serpentine Galleries, London; the Tate, London; the Barbican Centre, London; the Venice Biennale; and Art Angel.

Rendell was a member of the AHRC Peer Review College Member (2004–8) and the inaugural Chair of the RIBA’s Presidents Awards for Research (2005–8). She is on the Editorial Board for ARQ (Architectural Research Quarterly), Architectural Theory Review, GeoHumanities, The Happy Hypocrite, The Journal of Visual Culture in Britain, Ultima Thule and Zetisis.

== Selected publications ==
- Strangely Familiar: Narratives of Architecture in the City (London: Routledge, 1995), 96pp., and 80 illustrations. Iain Borden, Joe Kerr, Alicia Pivaro and Jane Rendell (eds).
- A Place Between, special issue of The Public Art Journal, n. 2, (October 1999), 56pp., 110 illustrations. Jane Rendell (ed.).
- Gender, Space, Architecture: an Interdisciplinary Introduction, (London: Routledge, 1999), 432pp., 17 illustrations. Jane Rendell, Barbara Penner and Iain Borden (eds).
- InterSections: Architectural Histories and Critical Theories (London: Routledge, 2000), 330pp., 83 illustrations. Iain Borden and Jane Rendell (eds).
- The Unknown City: Contesting Architecture and Social Space (Cambridge, Mass.: The MIT Press, 2001), 533pp., with 100 illustrations. Iain Borden, Jane Rendell, Joe Kerr with Alicia Pivaro (eds).
- The Pursuit of Pleasure: Gender, Space and Architecture in Regency London, (London: The Athlone Press/Continuum with Rutgers University Press, 2002).
- Critical Architecture, special issue of the Journal of Architecture (June 2005) v. 10. n. 3, 120pp., and 25 illustrations. Jane Rendell (ed.).
- Spatial Imagination (London: The Bartlett School of Architecture, 2005), 40pp., and 32 illustrations. Peg Rawes and Jane Rendell (eds).
- Art and Architecture: A Place Between, (London: IB Tauris, 2006), 240pp., 63 illustrations.
- Critical Architecture (London: Routledge, 2007), 320pp., 88 illustrations. Jane Rendell, Jonathan Hill, Murray Fraser and Mark Dorrian (eds).
- Pattern, special issue of HAECCEITY (2007). Ana Araujo, Jane Rendell and Jonathan Hill (eds).
- Site-Writing: The Architecture of Art Criticism, (London: IB Tauris, 2010), 256pp., 80 illustrations.
- The Architecture of Psychoanalysis: Spaces of Transition, (London: IB Tauris, 2017), 296pp., 105 illustrations.
- Silver (Hobart: A Published Event, 2017). 96pp., 32 illustrations.
- Reactivating the Social Condenser, special issue of the Journal of Architecture (forthcoming 2017). Michal Murawski and Jane Rendell (eds).
