= John Wynn =

John Wynn may refer to:

- John "Wynn" ap Maredudd, Head of the cadet lineage of the House of Aberffraw descending from Rhodri ab Owain Gwynedd, 1525–1559
- Sir John Wynn, 1st Baronet (1553–1627), his descendant, Welsh baronet, Member of Parliament for Carnarvonshire, 1586
- Sir John Wynn, 5th Baronet (1628–1719)
- Sir John Wynn, 2nd Baronet (1701–1773)

== See also ==
- John Wynne (disambiguation)
- John Wynn Baker (died 1775), Irish economist
