= Tamsyn Challenger =

British multi-disciplinary artist

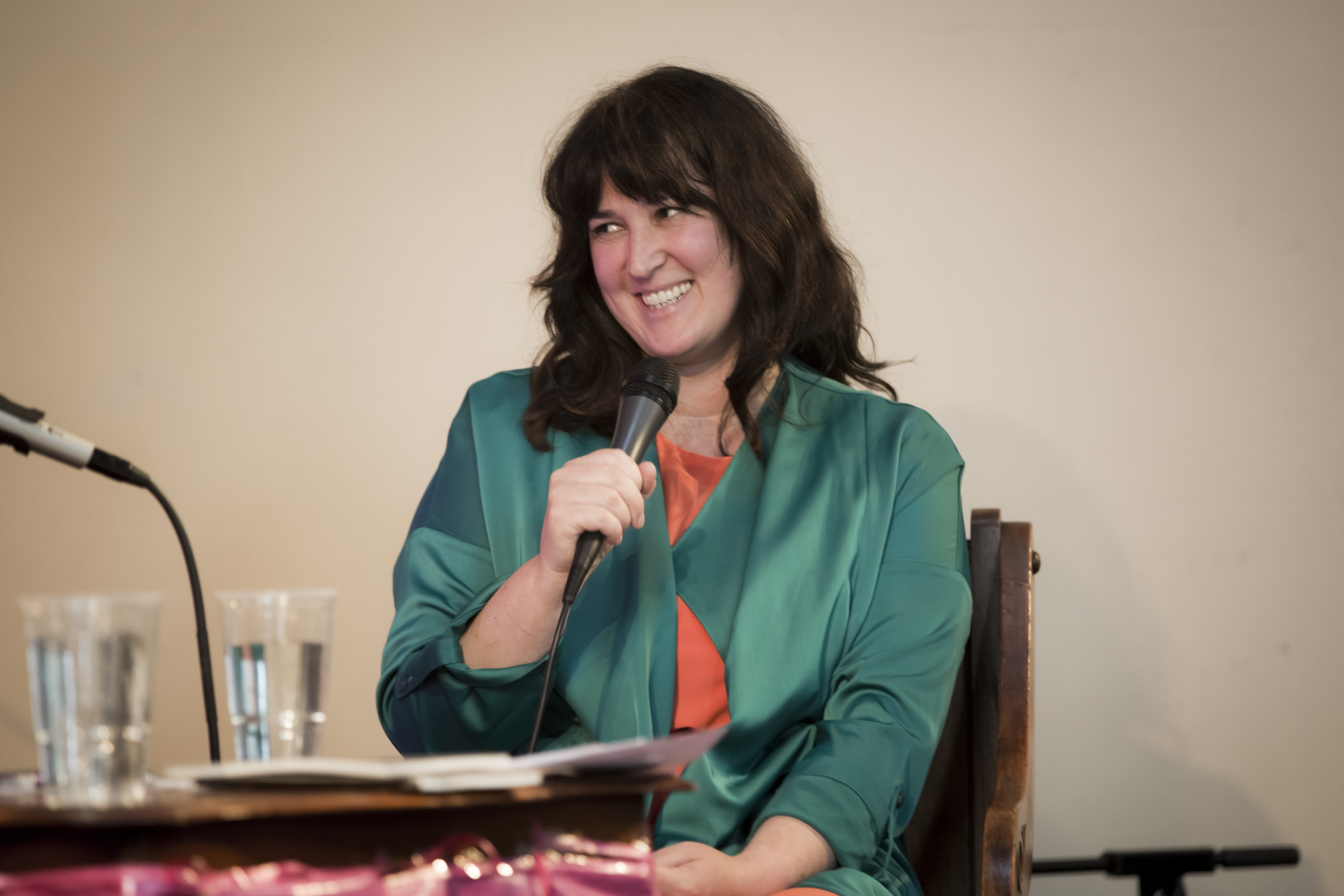
- Tamsyn Challenger speaking at the Stoke Newington Literary Festival, 2018
- Born: Tamsyn Challenger; Penzance, Cornwall, England
- Education: University for the Creative Arts
- Known for: Contemporary art
- Notable work: 400 Women; Free The Pussy! Monoculture
- Website: Tamsyn Challenger official website

Tamsyn Challenger is a multi-disciplinary artist and poet.

Her visual work has interrogated wide-ranging socio- and gender-political ideas including truth, trauma, precursor work on selfie culture, questioning the ‘free’ environment online and digital identity. Recognised twice by the Guardian's "Top 5 Exhibitions" list for her independent, institution-defying projects, she gained international recognition for 400 Women - a five year exploration of mortality, sexual violence and the capacity of art to re-personalise the statistic - and the 2018 curation, 'Free the Pussy!', featuring artists such as Yoko Ono and Judy Chicago.

A pioneer of "selfie culture" critique, Challenger's installations like Monoculture and the large-scale Twitter Chorus (commissioned by Southbank Centre) have been described by the New Scientist as "mesmerising and horrifying in equal measure". Her academic contributions include the David Vilaseca Memorial Lecture at Royal Holloway University where she remains a member of the Advisory Committee for the Centre of Visual Cultures, and more recently in May 2026 she became an invited speaker on the opposition side at the Cambridge Union for the debate 'This House Believes AI Will Kill The Artist'.

In recent years, Challenger has moved into a new phase of poetic output. Her first book of poems 'Him Hymn' was published in 2025 (Osmosis Press). American poet, Peter Gizzi called it a "striking debut – bold, intimate, and full of unexpected turns". It was launched at The Hunterian Museum and Gallery in Glasgow on the 19th of March, 2026. Poems, ‘White Cube’ and ‘Hearing a pigeon crunch on a rail’ were the first to be published by Anthropocene Poetry Journal in late 2024. Her poetry has appeared in a number of magazines and journals along with film poem work garnering recent selections at StAnza Festival, the Millennium Film Workshop and published by Ink, Sweat and Tears.

Challenger studied at Winchester School of Art and at the University for the Creative Arts (formerly Kent Institute of Art and Design) where she has subsequently been a visiting lecturer. Her sister is the author Melanie Challenger.

== Work ==
Challenger's first solo show was The Tamsynettes at Transition Gallery in Bethnal Green in March 2010. This work looking at stylised layers of beauty through mapping her corporeal deterioration over the course of a lifetime. The Tamsynettes yr 2 was shown at Beaconsfield (Vauxhall, London).

In 2006, Challenger began developing the idea for 400 Women. Politically concerned with gender violence, 400 Women began for Challenger when she visited Mexico in 2006 and is focused on the murdered and missing women of Juarez (see Female homicides in Ciudad Juárez). Challenger brought together a critical mass of nearly 200 international artists including Maggi Hambling, Paula Rego, Zoe Laughlin and Celia Paul to address issues of mortality and the capacity of art to imagine the dead, violence and trauma, with the aim of re-personalising the individual from a statistic. The show premiered in November 2010 at Shoreditch Town Hall Basement space, London, supported by the Arts Council and Amnesty International. The site-specific installation was subsequently selected as part of the Edinburgh Art Festival and later shown in Holland. 400 Women continues to tour internationally.

In 2012 Challenger contributed to a new protest book in conjunction with Pussy Riot published by Rough Trade Records, Let's Start A Pussy Riot. She was one of several contributors including Yoko Ono, Judy Chicago, Carolee Schneemann and several rock and punk musicians. Challenger produced a new sculptural work for the book, a highly coloured fully operational ducking stool, shown as a precursor work to Monoculture. Since 2022, the Ducking Stool sculpture has been on permanent loan at Tremenheere Sculpture Gardens.

During a residency at Beaconsfield Gallery she began exploring cultural homogeneity and the "selfie" portrait. In 2013, the resulting project, Monoculture premiered at Beaconsfield. It consisted of new large scale sculptural and multi-media works that explored the relationship between social media, sexuality and self-representation. Supported by the Arts Council, it was recommended by the Contemporary Art Society in April 2013. Monoculture was later shown as part of the Edinburgh Art Festival.

Twitter Chorus was a further development taken from the ideas behind Monoculture and voiced for the first time in England in 2015 at the Southbank Centre, the New Hall Art Collection, MEC, Cambridge University with Gaggle. In March 2016 this work was staged on a dramatic scale with hundreds of voices from multiple choirs as part of the Chorus Festival, Southbank Centre.

In 2016 she returned to Summerhall with new work, HYPER BOWL which was developed and shown for their visual art festival programme, and written up in The Times as "the paramount, walk-in art for the age of Trump".

The Empty Nest sculpture was unveiled ahead of her David Vilaseca Lecture entitled On Truth and displayed as part of the collection in the Royal Holloway University Picture Gallery.

== Curatorial ==
In 2018, Challenger curated her first exhibition, Free The Pussy!, which sprang out of her previous association with Pussy Riot. The exhibition was predominantly made up of archive work from 2012, when the "Riot" sent out their call to arms to the creative community; some of this work was featured in the book Let's Start a Pussy Riot.

Artists featured in the Free The Pussy! exhibition were No Bra, Judy Chicago, Challenger herself, Billy Chyldish, Gaggle, Gera (Nadya Tolokonnikova's daughter), The Gluts, Hayley Newman, Yoko Ono, Miss Pokeno, Pussy Riot, Jamie Reid, John Keane, Layla Sailor, Wendy Saunders, Carolee Schneemann and Voina.

She made a series of new "curatorial" interventions including the controversial The Royal Pussy signage, Corridor Dancefloor and 40 second miaow clock. Challenger also collaborated with Yoko Ono in a reshaping text work of Ono's 1985 song ‘Hell In Paradise’ and with punk artist Jamie Reid to create Putin Trampoline, from his protest poster Free Pussy Riot.

== Media ==
=== Radio and television ===
Tamsyn Challenger has written and produced programmes for BBC Radio 4 and BBC World Service, has been featured on BBC Two's The Review Show, BBC Two's Edinburgh Nights with Nish Kumar, BBC World Service Arts Hour, BBC Radio 4's Woman's Hour. Internationally, she has been featured on The Netherlands' Nieuwsuur and KRO De Wandeling.

Challenger has been an invited speaker at the Women Of The World Festival, UAL, RHUL, Glasgow, Oxford and Cambridge Universities. She's made documentary for the BBC, My Male Muse, with poet Clare Pollard being chosen for Radio 4's "Pick of the Year".

=== Critical comment ===
"It feels important still to challenge the boundaries (literally) of what a gallery is — and that's something you did with the signage. I really think you created 'art' by 'transgressing' in that way, and though it felt depressing it was part of the challenge you set up by curating the show." – Joanna Walsh discussing Free The Pussy! for the LA Review of Books, 2019

"As a metaphor for the treatment of Pussy Riot, it's on the money." – Nadine McBay's appraisal of the "Ducking Stool" sculpture, The National, 2018

"Challenger's wry, playful but nevertheless piercing critique infiltrates hyperbolic language from the inside – this is what makes the bowl shape of her structure so interesting. Not only is it an echo chamber in which hyperbole resounds and reverberates, but it also physically manifests hyperbole's tendency towards totalising: literally enveloping and entrapping discourse." – Colin Herd for Aesthetica, 2016

"Brill" – Mary Beard commenting on The Love-Byte (part of Monoculture) via Twitter.

"Mesmerising and horrifying in equal measure." – Kat Austen writing on Monoculture for the New Scientist in 2014

"A few more shows of the calibre of Tamsyn Challenger's tribute to the victims of Mexico's drugs war would have given this year's Edinburgh Art Festival a much-needed sense of global urgency and energy... 400 Women...is like a bullet to the brain" – Moira Jeffrey writing on 400 Women, Scotland on Sunday, 2012

"Stalin said, one death is a tragedy, a million is a statistic. And what she's trying to do is retrieve the individual tragedies from the statistic. And to feel like you're being watched by these women'...'It's so good at locating both the individual and the wider picture..." – Johann Hari for BBC Two The Review Show, 2010
