= Hayley Newman =

Hayley Newman is a London-based artist and Reader in Fine Art, who was born in Guildford, Surrey, in 1969. She is known for her work in performance art which has been exhibited since the early 1990s at venues including Tate Modern, the Ikon Gallery, the Centre d’Art Contemporain Genève and the Museum of Contemporary Photography. She teaches at Chelsea College of Art and Design and the Slade School of Fine Art, UCL. In 2004–2005 she was the Helen Chadwick Fellow at the British School in Rome.

Newman's work around economic, social and ecological crises led to the creation of a band, The Gluts (Hayley Newman, Gina Birch and Kaffe Matthews) and their eco-electro musical Café Carbon, which they took to the Copenhagen Climate Summit in 2009. She wrote the novella Common, based on her experiences as 'Self-appointed Artist in Residence' in the City of London, about the economic crisis from within, as it was happening on the streets of the square mile. The book documents the crash in the global markets, turbulence in the Eurozone and the riots that started in London but spread to the rest of Britain.

== Education ==
She received a BA from Middlesex University before gaining a Higher Diploma in Fine Art at the Slade School of Fine Art. In 1995 she studied at the Hochschule für Bildende Künste, Hamburg with a DAAD scholarship in the class of Marina Abramović. She completed her PhD titled Locating performance: textual identity and the performative at the University of Leeds in 2001.

== Key works ==
In 2006 Milton Keynes Gallery commissioned MKVH (Milton Keynes Vertical Horizontal). The premise was to drive a bus of volunteer passengers around the Milton Keynes grid system until it ran out of petrol. Milton Keynes was built on the American grid system which Newman states gave the "trip a sense of boredom, containment and involves going nowhere". The trip lasted 38 hours and 30 minutes, it was published and transcribed as MKVH the screenplay.

In 2001 she performed The Daily Hayley at Matts Gallery in East London over a period of 16 days. The work was based on a collection of newspapers that the artist gathered in the gallery and responded to.

In 1998 she created the series Connotations - Performance Images, documenting 'fake' performances.
