= Lucy Gunning =

English filmmaker, installation artist, sculptor, video artist and lecturer

- Born: 1 June 1964 (age 62); Newcastle upon Tyne, Tyne and Wear, England
- Citizenship: United Kingdom
- Education: West Surrey College of Art and Design; Falmouth School of Art; Goldsmiths' College
- Occupations: Filmmaker; Installation artist; Sculptor; Video artist
- Years active: 1993–present
- Awards: Paul Hamlyn Foundation Award for Visual Arts (2004)

Lucy Gunning (born 1 June 1964) is an English filmmaker, installation artist, sculptor, video artist and lecturer in fine art at the Chelsea College of Arts. Her works cross various media such as archival investigation, book-making, installation, performance, photography and video and her works are included in various public collections. Gunning was resident at various art institutions and won multiple awards for her works.

== Early life and education ==
Gunning was born in Newcastle upon Tyne, England. She graduated from the West Surrey College of Art and Design with a diploma in foundation studies in 1984. From 1984 to 1987, she studied at the Falmouth School of Art, graduating with a Bachelor of Arts degree in sculpture. Gunning was named the recipient of the 1987 Granada Foundation Prize, the Falmouth School of Art Sculpture Award and was part of the Whitworth New Contemporaries. She later moved to London, where she created a series of video works, and attended Goldsmiths' College between 1992 and 1994. She left Goldsmiths' with a Master of Fine Arts degree.

== Career ==
In 1993, she made the video film Climbing Around My Room and The Horse Impressionists the following year; both films lasted 7 1/2 minutes and earned her critical praise. Gunning was awarded £1,000 for winning the BT New Contemporaries Award in 1994, and the LAB Individual Artists Award two years later. Her next work was Malcolm, Lloyd, Angela, Norman, Jane in 1997, in which she filmed those with speech impediments choreographed across five individual monitors. Gunning followed up by making Untitled in 1999. During 2000, she received the LAB Visual Arts Fund: Artists, and won the DAAD award for residency at Westfälischer Kunstverein, Munster the following year. In 2001, Gunning did a six-month residency period at the British School at Rome through the Rome Scholarship.

She subsequently had a three-month residency period as artist-in-residence at Spike Island, Bristol in 2003, where she created two site-specific films. Gunning's first film there called Quarry captured a working quarry where an explosion of stone was recorded on a four-minute loog and the second being a geologist showing the viewer their crystal and rock collection in a room. In 2004, she made the video installation Esc that was divided into three monitors. Gunning won the Paul Hamlyn Foundation Award for Visual Arts in the same year, and was resident at Banff Centre for Arts and Creativity, Canada. She created the multi-faceted work The Archive, The Event and its Architecture inspired by her experience of being Wordsworth Trust's artist-in-residence and the intervention RePhil with the Philbrook Museum of Art collection in 2007.

From 2012 to 2014, Gunning was resident at the Kenneth Armitage Foundation. She is a senior lecturer in fine art at the Chelsea College of Arts, and won the 2018–19 Lorne Trust Scholarship. Gunning researches Georges Bataille's notion of l'informe, analysis of the binary thought of form verses content and the social implications of formlessness, in relation to behaviour and location. She has undertaken solo and group exhibitions of her work around the world throughout her career, and resides and works in West London. Gunning's works are held in the public collections of Arts Council England, the Centre Pompidou, the Contemporary Art Society, the Hayward Gallery, the Museum of Modern Art, Toyama and the Tate.

== Analysis ==
Gunning's works crosses various media such as archival investigation, book-making, installation, performance, photography and video. Marcus Crofton of Contemporary Art Society noted her works "ranges from documentary style filming of real-life subjects, to subjects that are structured and choreographed in order that she might film them." Crofton says she puts the emphasis on individual and social group behaviours as well as "internal space / external space, habitable and inhabitable spaces, psychological space, and looking for spaces in between what already exists – and considering these in relation to the human condition." An exhibitions director said of Gunning's works: "Lucy's work is all about desire and obsession" and that "she is not trying to make cinematography".

Andrew Cross in her entry in Grove Art Online wrote many of her videos reference video artists such as Bruce Nauman but "her focus on formal actions is overlaid by the complexities of metaphor and humour in situations that determine their own language and structure." Cross noted that she gives attention to "the human voice and its elementary social role in our existence" and that her works "focus upon the voice in the realm of the sensual, the unconscious and the uncontrolled." Jessica Lack of The Guardian wrote that Gunning "is not afraid of awkward situations, in fact her videos seem to thrive on them. Watching one of her social diaries is a little like being an interloper, her camera an indiscriminate voyeur of our lives."
