= Peter Collis =

English visual artist

Peter Collis (16 November 1929 – 18 April 2012) was an English landscape and still life artist who moved to Ireland and produced almost all his work there.

== Life and career ==
Collis studied at the Epsom College of Art between 1947 and 1952. In the 1950s he exhibited some paintings, but then stopped painting and worked in business. He married an Irish woman, Anne McNally, in 1957 and subsequently visited Ireland and began painting Irish landscapes. He moved to Ireland in 1969.

He worked for Shell Oil company, painting in early morning from sketches and studies made during sales trips across the country, but was later able to make his living as a full time artist. He was influenced by the work of Cézanne and de Vlaminck. Just as Cezanne repeatedly painted Mont Sainte-Victoire, Collis repeatedly painted the Sugar Loaf in County Wicklow.

In 1990 he was elected a member of the RHA. He served as treasurer (1994–1998) and was on its annual exhibition selection committee (1992–2002). A retrospective exhibition of his work was held in the John Martin Gallery, London in March 2012.

Works by Collis are in several public collections including AIB, Bank of Ireland, Limerick University, UCD and OPW and in the private collections of Bono, Lord David Puttnam and others.

== Awards ==
Awards included the Royal Trust Co. Ltd award in 1975, Maurice McGonigal Landscape prize in 1981 and James Adam Salesroom Award RHA in 1999.

He represented Ireland in Expo '92 in Seville.
