= Diploma of Biblical Studies =

The Diploma of Biblical Studies (DipBS) is a one-year course in biblical, theological, historical and pastoral studies offered by a variety of Christian Bible colleges.

== Colleges offering a DipBS ==
The following colleges offer a Diploma of Biblical Studies or an equivalent:

=== United States ===
- Beacon Institute of Ministry, Columbus, Georgia
- Summit Theological Seminary, Peru, Indiana
- Christian Leaders Institute, Michigan
- Ames International School of Ministry, Florida
- International School of Ministry (ISOM), San Bernardino, California

=== Canada ===
- Bethany College, Saskatchewan, Canada
- Kawartha Lakes Bible College, Ontario, Canada
- Emmanuel Bible College.Ontario, Canada

=== Australia ===
- Moore Theological College, Sydney, Australia
- Citipointe Ministry College, Brisbane, Australia

=== New Zealand ===
- Bible College of New Zealand
- The Shepherd’s Bible College, New Zealand
- South Pacific Bible College, Tauranga, New Zealand

=== Pakistan ===
- The Protestant Biblical Institute
- Lord’s Bible College and Seminary Islamabad
