= Jane Mulfinger =

American conceptual artist and educator

- Born: 1961 (age 64–65); Pasadena, California, US
- Education: Royal College of Art, Stanford University
- Known for: installation, sculpture, public art
- Style: Interdisciplinary, site-specific
- Spouse: Graham Budgett
- Awards: Microsoft Research Grant, British Arts Council, The Elephant Trust, Unilever Sculpture Award
- Website: Jane Mulfinger

Jane Mulfinger is an American conceptual artist and educator whose art includes installations, time-based works and sculpture. Mulfinger has been based in Berlin, London, and since 1994, at the University of California, Santa Barbara (UCSB), where she is a professor. Her work collects and transforms human artifacts—ranging from found clothing or photographs to language (personal accounts, jokes, literature) to abandoned architectural spaces—in order to reflect on experience, perception, memory, and concealed histories. She has exhibited in the United Kingdom, the United States, Colómbia, Israel, and throughout Europe. Reviews and features on her work have appeared in Flash Art, Tema Celeste, The Times (London), The Guardian, the Los Angeles Times, The Economist, and La Stampa, among others, and on BBC Radio and Radio 1 Austria. Critic Richard Dyer wrote that Mulfinger's art "transforms spaces, both exterior and interior, breaks and inverts codes, laughs at the irrationality of language and shatters the syntax of remembrance the better to help us remember, not just the past but its meaning in the present." Mulfinger is married to artist Graham Budgett and lives and works in Santa Barbara, California.

Jane Mulfinger, Norris R. E. (details), recycled clothing, wood, paint, fabric, projection, 15' x 25' x 15', 1989. Site-specific installation at Royal College of Art, London. Shown: skylight (top), ground floor view with projection (below).

== Life and career ==
Mulfinger was born in Pasadena, California in 1961. While attending Stanford University (BA, Studio Art, 1983), she traveled to Florence, Italy in 1980, an experience that shifted her early art from painting to sculpture focused on the body, built environment and history. In 1983, she moved to West Berlin, where she studied with expatriate sculptor Shinkichi Tajiri at Hochschule der Künste, became friends with Edward and Nancy Reddin Kienholz, explored found objects, and had her first solo show (Endart Gallery, 1987). After working on installation art during graduate studies at the Royal College of Art (MA, Sculpture, 1989), Mulfinger remained in London, gaining institutional (Arts Council of Great Britain and Unilever Sculpture awards) and critical recognition for shows at the Flaxman Gallery, Camden Arts Centre, Southampton Museum of Art, and the Mayor Gallery, among others.

In 1994, Mulfinger moved to Santa Barbara, California to accept a teaching appointment at UCSB. She continued to exhibit widely, with solo shows at Franklin Furnace Archive (New York, 1995), Centre for Contemporary Arts (Glasgow, 1995), Galerie Guido Carbone (Turin, 1997–2008), Mayor Gallery, Santa Barbara Contemporary Arts Forum (1999, 2004), and the Otis College of Art & Design (2004). Her work has also been featured at Contemporary Art Society and Beaconsfield Gallery (both London), Armory Center for the Arts, and the Santa Barbara Museum of Art. She has curated exhibitions for Beaconsfield and at UCSB.

== Work and reception ==
Mulfinger has worked with a wide range of materials, media and strategies; her approach has been likened to "an alchemist [who] turns the mundane and banal into something extraordinary." Critics such as Sacha Craddock suggest that a key strategy in her work involves putting everyday found objects and photographs—characterized by John Stathatos as "burdened with a haunting familiarity"—into disquieting or unfamiliar contexts and relationships in order to enable viewers to re-encounter them.

=== Installation works ===
Jane Mulfinger, Caught in Passing (installation detail), 22 pairs of cast Schott Crystal shoes, 1993–4. Installation at Mayor Gallery, London.

Mulfinger's early work probed collective experience, memory and history through found objects, images and interventions in architectural space. In installations such as Norris, R.E. and Rhoberts I (both 1989), she transformed exhibition spaces into sites of contemplation and optical effects by sewing locally collected, discarded clothing into tarpaulins that were fit over skylights, creating multi-colored panels resembling cathedral stained glass. Beneath them, she altered the environments by painting walls, covering windows in fabric, and adding continuous benches or chairs. She sometimes projected images of seated individuals from different historical periods onto the benches. Writers suggested that the work connected viewers to a cycle of life, death, presence and absence. Curator Kate Bush wrote, "unfolding through the passage of time, recuperable through memory, and incarnate in the objects we leave behind".

In related works, Mulfinger explored monochromatic effects (the all-blue Deluge, 1990), geographies, source materials and media. For Caught in Passing (1994)—done in residency at the New York Experimental Glass Workshop—she cast 22 pairs of rejected shoes from Salvation Army thrift stores in crystal, reconstituting the abject discards into an homage to unknown lives that The Independent (London) called a "beautifully surreal" work of "ghostly translucence." The installation I Battuti Bianchi ("The White Flagellants," 1991) referenced the symbolic gowns of a historical sect in Carignano, Italy by sewing white, second-hand clothing into a hot air balloon-like structure housed in the town basilica, creating a cluster of associations around sacred and profane garments and the human desire for ascendance, through science and spirituality. For Armory as Cathedral, Beyond the Visible Spectrum (2002), Mulfinger covered the outside of two 45' x 7' skylights with tarpaulins of sewn garments facing the same direction, one red and one blue. Set at a former armory (now the Armory Center for the Arts), and exposed to wind and weather, the iconically color-coded panels pointedly referenced the nation's political, religious, and social divisions.

Jane Mulfinger, Lost for Words (installation detail), 186 second-hand engraved spectacles, glass, spotlights, latex, 36' x 12' x 6', 1991. Installation at Flaxman Gallery, London.

=== Text-based works ===
In the 1990s, Mulfinger frequently used found text and symbols in works that examined cultural history, the elusiveness of memory, and the simultaneous potency and limits of language. In several series, she etched second-hand prescription eyeglasses with braille, Morse code or musical notation (Spectacles, 1991), poetry (No Vacancy, 1991), or first-hand accounts of intense sensory experiences (Lost for Words, 1991), often one word or phrase per lens; lined up on glass shelves, the dramatically lit, delicately shadowed pieces formed hard-to-read passages or paragraphs. Critics, such as Sue Hubbard, described them as "subtle, witty and poetic" takes on the paradoxes of comprehension and mystery, illumination and blindness.

Conceived against the backdrop of European Union negotiations and plans for the Channel Tunnel, Mulfinger's commissioned Common Knowledge (1992) featured thirteen ethnic jokes (in their original languages) about various Europeans, sandblasted onto glass panels installed without explanation in windows at the ticket office of Saint Pancras Station, the planned Channel Tunnel terminus. Critic Sarah Kent judged the work's exposure of publicly excluded, but privately common xenophobic discourse as "both funny and offensive"; The Economist puzzled over its intent and mix of the aesthetically beautiful, timely and "rude."

Jane Mulfinger & Graham Budgett, Regrets (detail), interactive archive, public conceptual artwork, action-research study, 2005–2008. Cambridge, UK, 2005 (left), Paris, France, 2008 (right). Additional stagings in Linz, Austria (2006), Santa Barbara, California (2008).

Mulfinger's interest in textual artifacts and private experience made public evolved into the Regrets project, which has delved into introspection and its potential for renewal through the collection and display of anonymous regrets. The project began as an installation at Franklin Furnace Archive (1995); it featured locally collected regrets etched onto rear-view mirrors atop stilts that reflected projected, site-specific satellite and human imagery. Art Monthly wrote that the rear-view mirror metaphor "tease[d] poetic resonances out of unpromising materials;" other reviews noted how the obscured legibility of the text acknowledged ambivalent desires for disclosure and secrecy. Five site-specific versions followed in Estonia, London, Brussels, Turin and Northern Ireland. Between 2005–8, Mulfinger collaborated with Graham Budgett to stage Regrets as an interactive street project in Cambridge, Linz, Santa Barbara, and Paris. Employing a mobile "confessional"-like booth and five roaming backpack units, they collected local regrets (later projected onto public spaces), and in return, provided participants with five algorithm-determined, similar regrets, intended to offer relief through solidarity. The Guardian described the project, which has built an archive of tens of thousands of regrets in four languages, as "surprisingly poetic." In 2018, Mulfinger created a similar project collecting stories and images focused on guilt, called Spectral Latencies, at the Center for Interdisciplinary Research, Bielefeld in Germany.

Jane Mulfinger, The Drunkard Forwarned and the Swearer Caution'd I (detail), air compressor, vinyl, cloth, etched silver plate, video, 17' x 18' x 4', 1998–2004. Installation at Mayor Gallery, London. Subsequent installations at Galerie Carbone, Turin (2000) and Ben Maltz Gallery at Otis College, Los Angeles (2004).

=== Time-related works ===
Mulfinger has created time-based installations employing movement, chance and performance and individual works based on transient natural processes. The latter include sequential etchings on glass that chart formations of clouds (No Image No Matter, 1998), volcanic debris (Helen's Body, 2001) and hurricanes (Catarina, Fran, Hugo, Roslyn, 2015). In the installations Device for Irregular Apparitions (1997), Filled with Content, Emptied with Form (1999), Dangling Modifier (1999) and Exacting Minutia While History Repeats (2004, 2007), she used down feathers blown blizzard-like by industrial fans within large, often Plexiglass, spaces to explore dematerialization, motion and light effects, the passage of time, and the rise and fall of history. With Mobile Apparitions (2003), Mulfinger took this work out of galleries and into the streets of Los Angeles, London and Venice, wheeling large glass tubes and life-sized aluminum and glass boxes that slowly propelled enclosed feathers to bring ethereal moments of contemplation and visual pleasure into contrast with the fast pace of city life.

The Drunkard Forwarned and the Swearer Caution'd (1999–2004) combined Mulfinger's interests in text, time, and interactivity in an installation consisting of a silver Spandex-like bouncy castle that viewers sat on, projected floating clouds, and dangling silver plaques engraved with medieval virtues and vices that tarnished at different rates in a consideration of historical moral systems.

=== Los Angeles projects ===
Between 2004 and 2009, Mulfinger created two multi-disciplinary, research-oriented projects that examined Los Angeles as an object of urban decline and renewal. The Fictive City and Its Real Estate: The Tale of the Transcontinental Railway (2004) focused the use of Chinese labor for the transcontinental railway and the demolition of the original Chinatown during construction of Union Station; with text contributions from urban historian Norman M. Klein and artist Annie Shaw, it probed the role of railroad construction in configuring borders, places and relationships, buried ethnic, racial and class narratives, and the subjective nature of accepted history. The work incorporated performance (a two-mile, live model railroad construction and journey from Union Station to Chinatown, which also served as a quasi-historical tour), video, and a gallery installation in the New Chinatown Barbershop that included old maps from the archives of the Chinese Historical Society. Autonomy is No Longer Possible or Interesting, Part I (2009) focused attention on a shuttered community center, the Julia Morgan-designed Pasadena YWCA. Mulfinger installed four exercise bikes converted into power generators outside the entrance; rigged to light a glass crystal chandelier in the lobby, they revealed the still-elegant, symmetrical building design inside to viewers peering in when powered.

== Education career ==
Mulfinger has taught at the University of California at Santa Barbara (UCSB) since 1994, holding various positions in the College of Creative Studies and the Department of Art Studio, including Professor Spatial Studies/Sculpture since 2009 and Art Department Chair (2011–4). In addition to teaching courses in Proportional Analyses, Mobile Works, Installation and Arte Povera, and Material Strategies, she has created two new artist residency programs at UCSB, assisted in the implementation of the art building remodel, and co-curated the first major alumni exhibition, which included Mark di Suvero, Mary Heilmann, Suzanne Lacy, Ander Mikalson and Richard Serra. Mulfinger has also taught at the University of North Carolina (1997), Southampton Art Museum (UK, 1993) and Chelsea College of Art and Design (1992).

== Awards and recognition ==
Mulfinger has received artist-in-residencies from Beaconsfield (London, 2016), American Academy in Rome (2016), the Djerassi Artists Residency (2002), the National Glass Centre, (UK, 2001), the University of North Carolina (1997), and the New York Experimental Glass Workshop (1993). She has been awarded a Microsoft Research Grant, Cambridge, UK (2005), British Council Travel Awards (1993–7), the OSARCA Prize (Royal College of Art Society, 1989), an Elephant Trust Grant (1989), and a Unilever Sculpture Award (1988).
