= Seven Sisters Group =

seven sisters group logo

Seven Sisters Group are a British performance company, formed in 1994. The group focuses on communicating contemporary issues through new and idiosyncratic works that defy labelling. Their highly acclaimed projects are often site specific and combine contemporary dance, installation art, performance art and spoken word.

The company's artistic director is founder Susanne Thomas. Co-founder Sophie Jump is co-artistic director.

The group has worked with teams of independent artists whose disciplines include theatre design (Sophie Jump, Rosa Freitas), fine art (Ed King), music (Phil Durrant, Martin Robinson) and video (Jane Hodge, Jaime Rory Lucy, Ludi Andrews and Davy McGuire). The work is devised in collaboration with the group – current and previous performance members include Domingo Bermudez, Claire Burrell, Robert Cook, Carolyn Deby, Marie-Louise Flexen, Louise Hedley, Fred Gehrig, Chantal McCormick, Kristin McGuire, Glyn Pritchard, Emma Teixidor, Heidi Rustgaard, Alice Sara, Esther Weisskopf.

== Productions ==
- Silence
- On Stage
- Salome
- Trainstation
- Concrete
- Ballroom
- Removed
- Stairworks
- Doubletake
- The Forbidden
- The Forest
- Boxed
- Wapping Chairs
- Asterion
- Atalanta
- A Small Study of Troubled Souls
- Like a Fish Out of Water
- The Twelfth Player

== See also ==
- Theatre of the United Kingdom
