= Critical spatial practice =

Forms of practice between art and architecture

The term ‘critical spatial practice’ refers to forms of practice between art and architecture. Jane Rendell introduced the term in 2003. Rendell later consolidated and developed the term as one that defined practices located at a three-way intersection: between theory and practice, public and private, and art and architecture. For Rendell, critical spatial practice is informed by Michel de Certeau’s The Practice of Everyday Life (1980, translated into English in 1984), and Henri Lefebvre’s The Production of Space (1974, translated into English in 1991), as well as the critical theory of the Frankfurt School, but her definition aims to transpose the key qualities of critical theory – self-reflection and social transformation – into practice. In Rendell’s work, critical spatial practices are those that question and transform the social conditions of the sites into which they intervene, as well as test the boundaries and procedures of their own disciplines.

Other theorists and practitioners have since worked with the term, evolving it in different directions. For example, there was the reading group and blog spot initiated by Nicholas Brown in the early 2000s, which came out of discussions around Brown’s own artistic walking practice. In 2011, Nikolaus Hirsch and Markus Miessen started a book series with Sternberg Press called Critical Spatial Practice, which focused on architectural discourse and practice. In the first publication, they asked, "What is Critical Spatial Practice?" In 2016, Hirsch and Miessen set up a website site called criticalspatialpractice.org to archive their work in this area since 2011. The MaHKUscript, Journal of Fine Art Research published a special issue on critical spatial practice in 2016, where many of the contributors enact critical spatial practices concerned with political and ecological issues. In 2019, Rendell established the website criticalspatialpractice.co.uk to formalise the term, archiving projects located between art and architecture, "that both critiques the sites into which they intervened as well as the disciplinary procedures through which they operated."
