= Susan Collis =

British artist

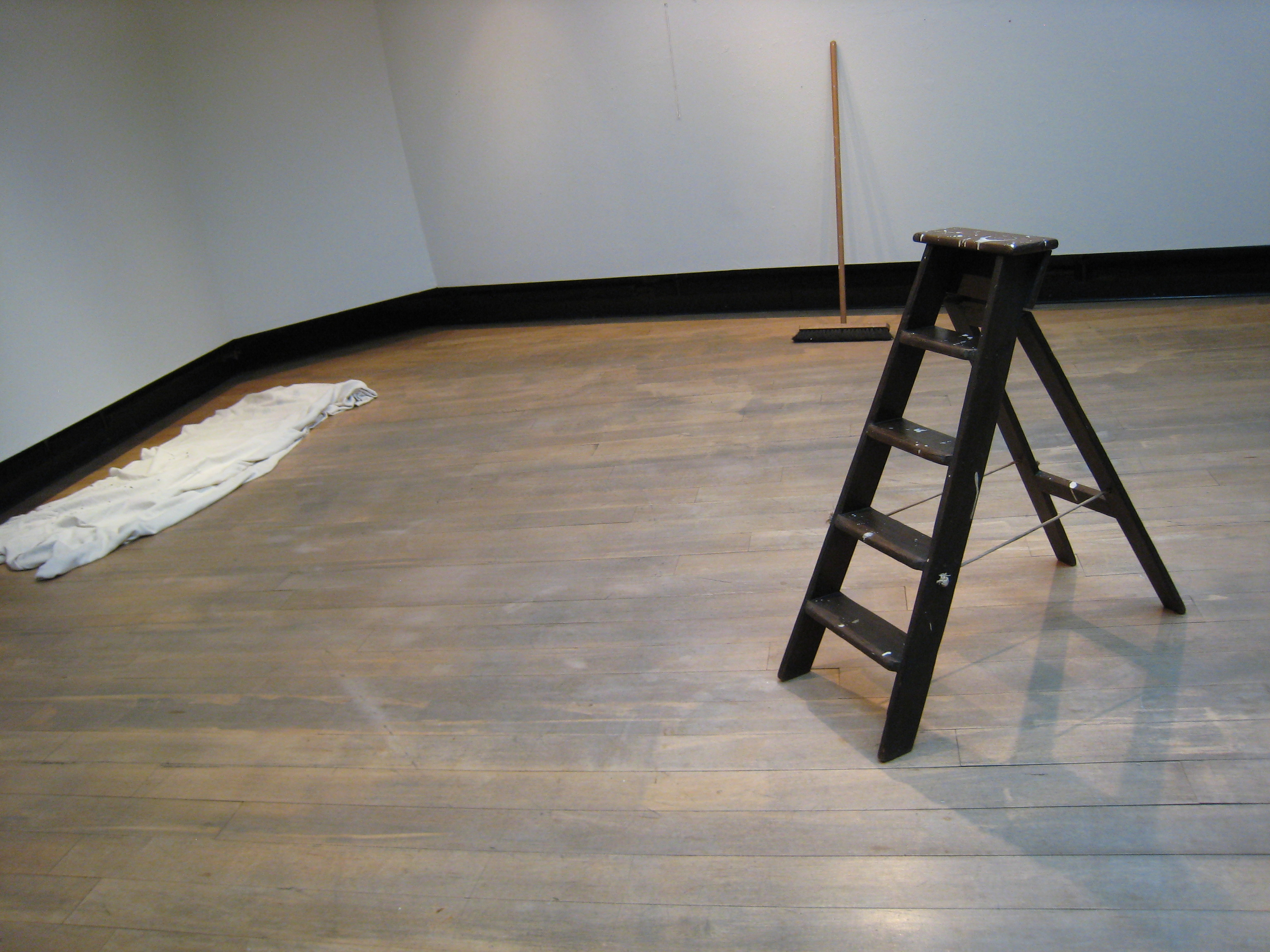
Part of the 2017 exhibition "When we loved you best of all"

Susan Collis (born 1956) is a British artist working in Hackney, London. She is known for crafting ordinary looking, everyday objects from valuable materials. In her approach to sculpture, Collis manages to elevate the mundane, celebrate traditional craft techniques, and encourage viewers to take second, closer looks.

== Early life and education ==
Collis was born in Edinburgh, Scotland. She studied sculpture, gaining a BA(Hons) in 2000 at the Chelsea School of Art, London and a MA from the Royal College of Art in 2002.

== Life and work ==
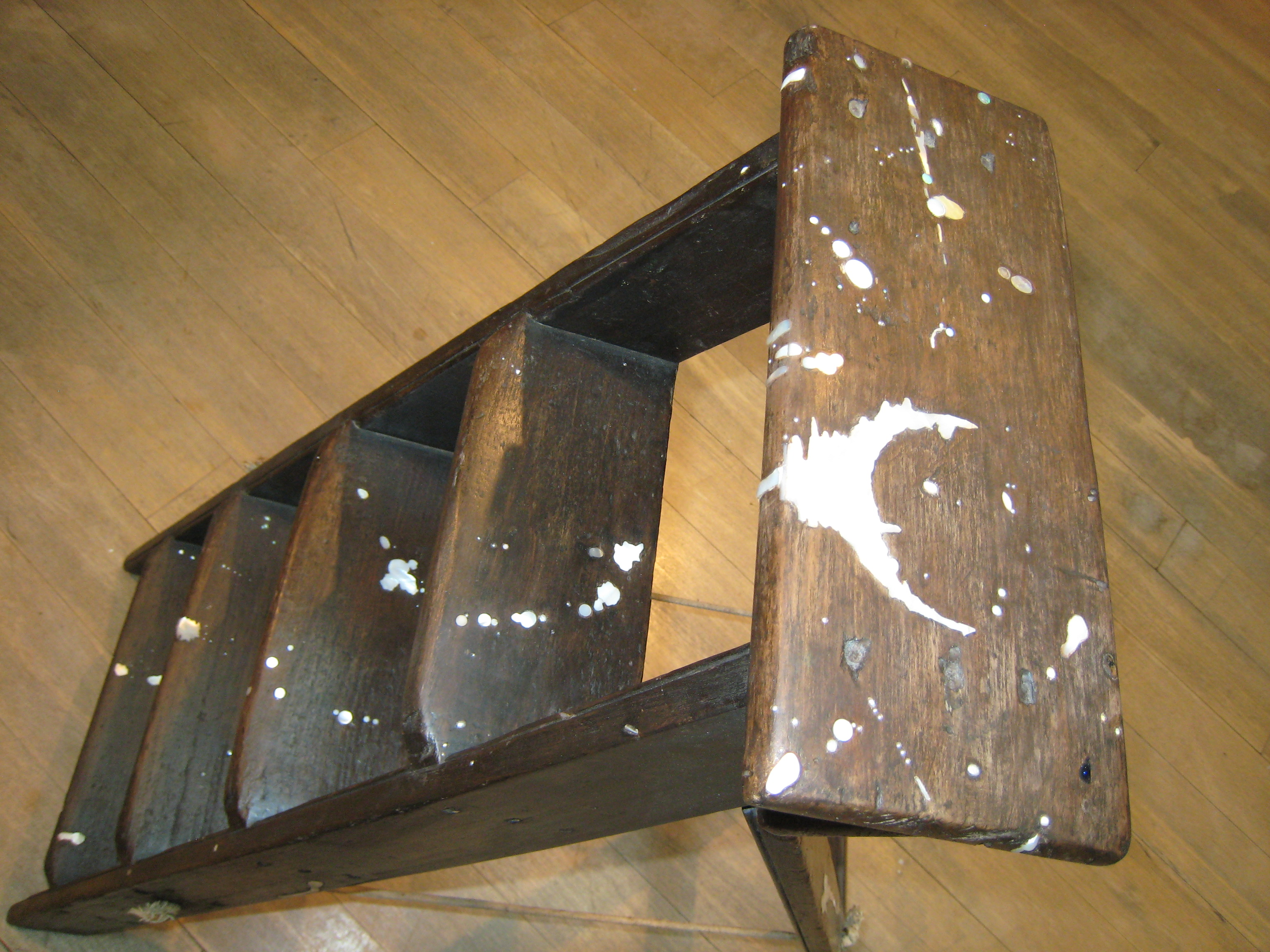
"White Lies" (2006) What appear to be paint spatters are inlays of semi-precious and precious materials such as mother of pearl, opals and diamonds

Collis uses a variety of techniques and strategies to investigate issues concerning interpretation, craft, value and labor. Everyday objects are presented etched, splattered and stained with marks of work, wear and tear. At first glance, the marks seem to be the accidental results of normal use, and as such seem meaningless and not worthy of examination. Collis is interested in the shift of perception that takes place upon discovery that they are, in fact, careful, intentional acts, and that the materials used are traditionally valued for their financial or decorative properties. A tired stepladder covered with paint drips from years of use has been simulated by the meticulous inlaying of diamonds, pearls, opals and other prized materials. A bucket catching a drip from the gallery ceiling may not be the result of neglect, rather a complex staging of pumps, water-tanks and false walls to artificially create the scenario. Typically works involve large amounts of often hidden labor to create an object that may easily go unnoticed, but is replete with value, be it material or conceptual. Much of Collis’ work can go unnoticed and this visual gamble results in a possible conceptual pay-off that rewards concerted investigation by the viewer.

Collis’s work has been exhibited at venues including Ikon in Birmingham, the Walker Art Center in Minneapolis, the Christchurch Art Gallery in New Zealand, the Massachusetts Museum of Contemporary Art, the Zabludowicz Collection, and the Israel Museum in Jerusalem.

Collis won a British Cement Association Award in 2001, the Pizza Express Prospects Contemporary Drawing Prize and the Jerwood Student Drawing Prize in 2002.

== Sources ==
- Prince, Nigel (2010). Tell me what you see. Birmingham: Ikon Gallery.
- Honoré, Vincent (1 November 2009). "An Interview with Susan Collis". 20 Hoxton Square.
- Milliard, Colline (1 February 2010). "The Hyperreal World of Susan Collis". Modern Painters.
- Shirley, Rosemary (2007). Don't get your hopes up. London: Seventeen.
- Carey-Kent, Paul (1 December 2007). "Frieze and its followers...". Art World.
