= Monica Ross =

British artist, academic, and feminist

- Born: 26 November 1950; Lancashire, England
- Died: 14 June 2013 (aged 62); Brighton and Hove, England
- Education: University of Reading
- Spouse: Bernard Mills
- Website: monicaross.org

Monica Ross (1950–2013) was a British artist, academic, and feminist. Her career producing feminist works spanned four decades. She is notable particularly for her contributions to performance art, which reflected her passion for social change and were displayed in such diverse places as public libraries and Greenham Common. These works were often collaborative, with Ross contributing to the establishment both of the seminal Women's Postal Art Event and Sister Seven. The culminating work of her career and life was Anniversary – an act of memory: solo, collective and multi-lingual recitations from memory of the Universal Declaration of Human Rights, a 5-year extended performance work which involved the recitation of the Universal Declaration of Human Rights by heart. Ross also worked in video, drawing, installation, and text.

== Early life ==
Monica Ross was born in Lancashire, England, on 26 November 1950.

== Artistic career ==
Ross began her career as a feminist artist and organiser. She took an active role in mounting collective initiatives such as Feministo: Representations of the Artist as Housewife, a 1977 women's postal art event, and Fenix, a 1978–1980 touring project. In 1980, she co-founded Sister Seven, a distribution network for poster art and shows held in churches, libraries, peace camps, and on the street.

The culminating work of her career and life was Anniversary – an act of memory: solo, collective and multi-lingual recitations from memory of the Universal Declaration of Human Rights, an extended performance work which involved the recitation of the Universal Declaration of Human Rights, learnt by heart. Launched by Ross in 2008, the thirty articles were intended to be delivered in sixty instalments to mark the sixtieth anniversary of the Universal Declaration of Human Rights. The sixtieth and final recital took place at the 23rd session of the United Nations Human Rights Council in Geneva on 14 June 2013. On the same day she died in a hospice in Hove, only a few weeks after being diagnosed with cancer.

== Academic career ==
Ross began teaching in 1985. Her academic positions included Senior Lecturer on Fine Art at London's Saint Martins School of Art (now Central Saint Martins) from 1985 to 1990, and supervisor of the Critical Fine Art Practice course at that school from 1990 to 1998. She was a guest professor at the Institut für Kunst in Kontext (Universität der Künste, Berlin) in 2004 and an Arts and Humanities Research Council Research Fellow in Fine Art at Newcastle University from 2001 to 2004. In 2014, the year following her death, a digital archive of Ross's work from the 1970s through 2013 was acquired by the British Library, which described her as "one of the most significant feminist artists and distinguished educators of her generation".

== Legacy ==
The Monica Ross Action Group (MRAG) was established in 2013, following her death, to ensure that new audiences benefitted from her legacy. The group undertakes projects with the professed aim "to make visible Monica's invaluable contribution to contemporary practice, expand an understanding of the nature and impact of her long-standing radical practice, and demonstrate how her work is crucially relevant to a contemporary reassessment of feminist performance practice and theory".

As of 2015, the Monica Ross Action Group consisted of artists Susan Hiller, Suzanne Treister, and Anne Tallentire, as well as partner Bernard Mills and daughter Alice Ross. The group was responsible for the organisation of "Monica Ross: A Symposium", which took place at the British Library on Friday 28 November 2014.
