= Mattias Härenstam =

Swedish artist (born 1971)

- Born: 1971; Sweden
- Known for: Sculpture, Installation, Video Art
- Website: www.mattiasharenstam.com

Mattias Härenstam (born 1971) is a Swedish artist. Härenstam specializes in sculpture, installation and video art.

== Biography ==
Härenstam graduated from National Academy of Fine Arts in Bergen, Norway and Städelschule in Frankfurt on Main.

== Solo exhibitions ==
2008

- Galleri UKS, Oslo.

2009

- Skånes Konstförening, Malmö

2011

- Akershus Art Centre, Norway
- Tidens krav, Oslo.

2012

- Tromsø Fine Art Society, Norway
- Kunstnerforbundet, Oslo
- Galleri 54, Gothenburg

2013

- Luleå Konsthall, Sweden
- Galleri Rostrum, Malmö, Sweden
- Trafo Kunsthall, Norway

2014

- Art-Claims-Impulse Contemporary Fine Arts, Berlin
- Konstnärshuset, Stockholm
- Galleri Norske Grafikere, Oslo
- Østfold Art Centre, Fredrikstad, Norway
