= John Wynne (sound artist) =

Canadian multidisciplinary artist

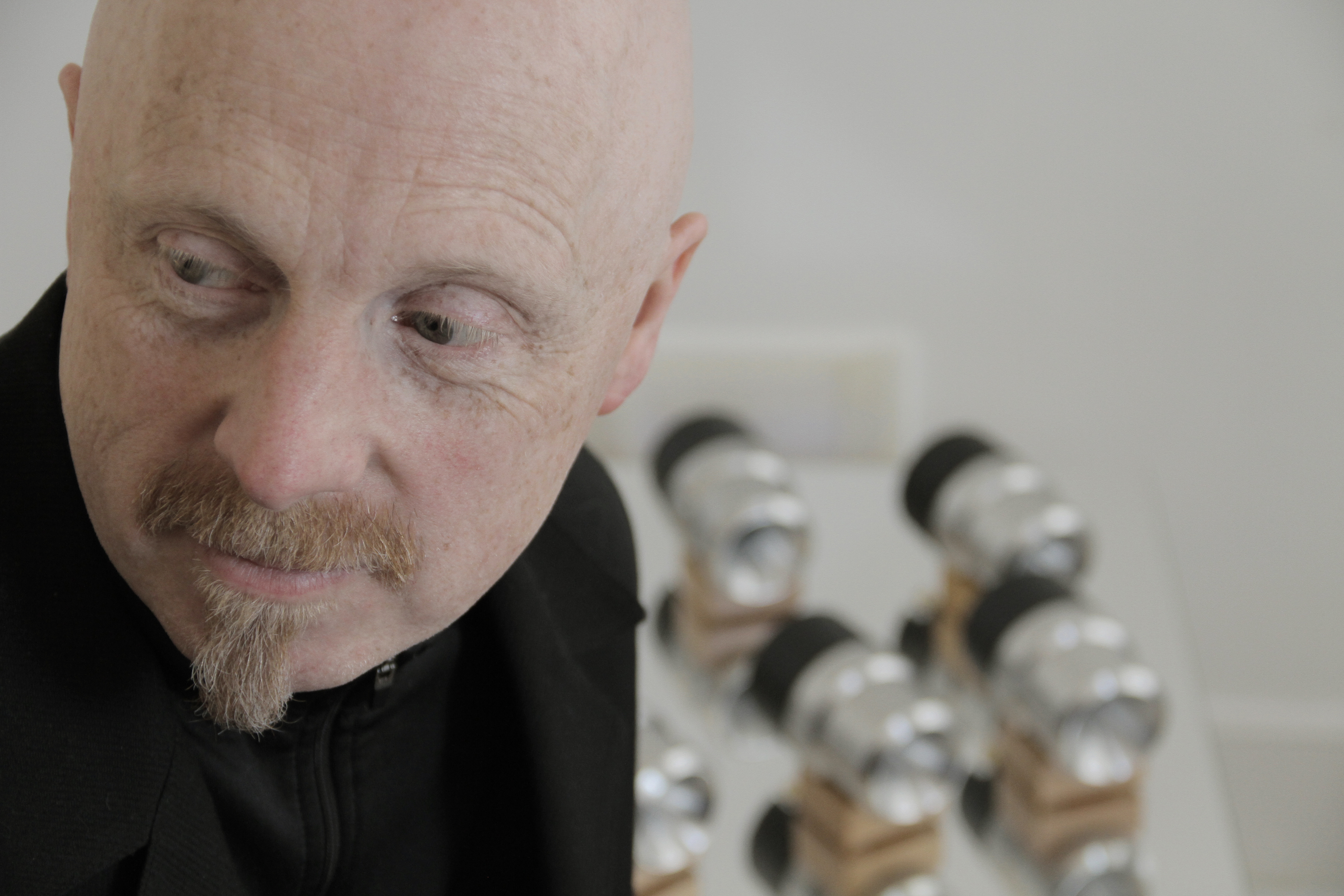
John Wynne

John Wynne (born 1957) is a Canadian/British artist and professor emeritus of sound art. Wynne is known primarily for his sound-based installation works.

== Early life and education ==
He received a BA (Hons) in English literature in 1984 from Queen’s University in Kingston, Ontario. He received a PhD in Sound Art from Goldsmiths College, University of London in 2007.

== Work and exhibitions ==
Wynne is best known for his series of installations involving large accumulations of cast-off speakers, beginning with Fallender ton für 207 lautsprecher boxen (Falling tone for 207 loudspeakers) in Berlin in 2004. In 2009, his Installation for 300 speakers, player piano and vacuum cleaner at the Beaconsfield Gallery in London was the first piece of sound art purchased by the Saatchi collection. Wynne won the 2010 British Composer Award for Sonic Art for this piece, and when it was shown at the Saatchi Gallery in 2010 as part of Newspeak, Adrian Searle wrote in The Guardian that:

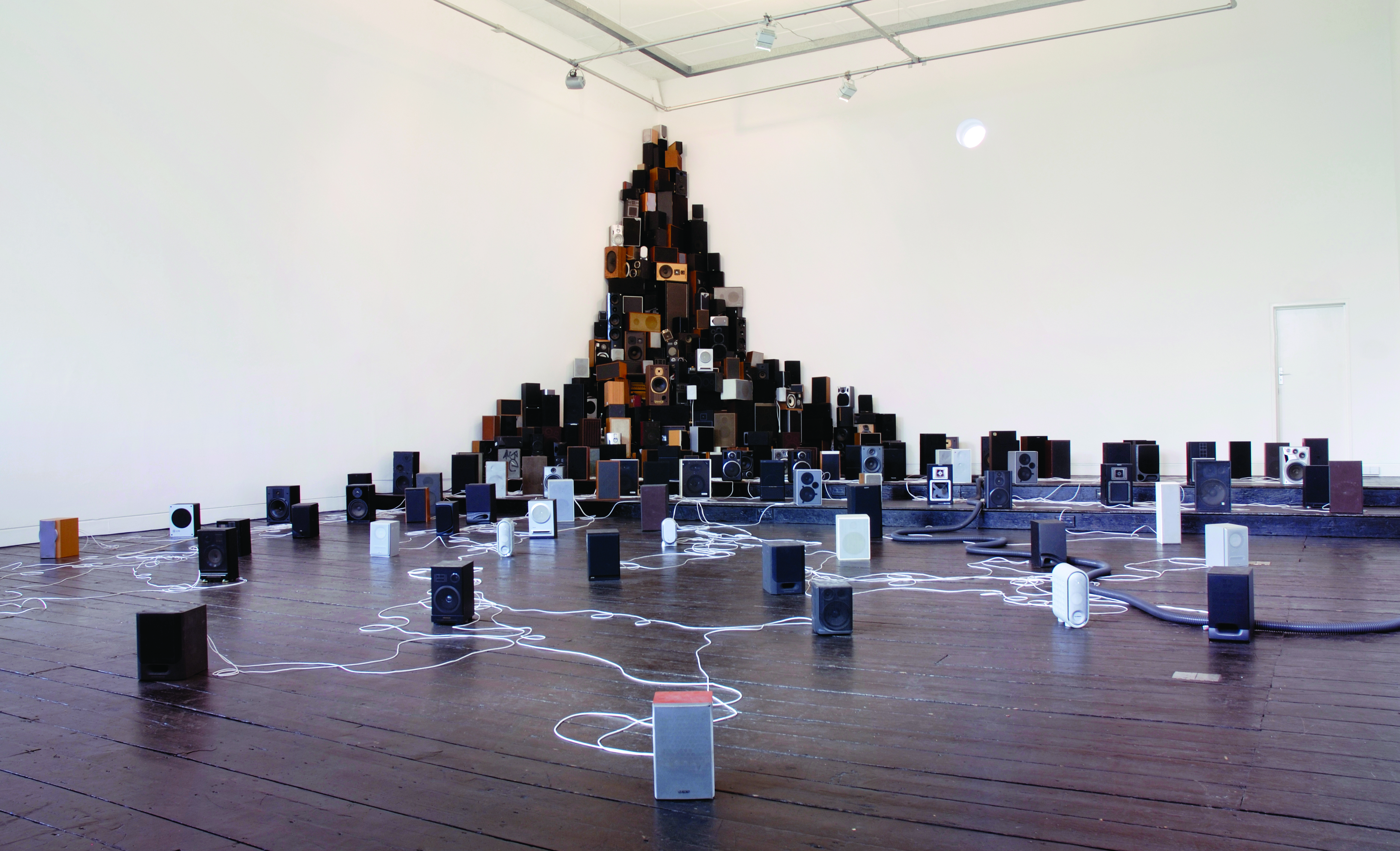
Installation for 300 speakers, Pianola and vacuum cleaner.

John Wynne's collection of 300 audio speakers, all reclaimed from a recycling plant, that tower in the corner of a double-height gallery and stand about the floor. Somewhere in all this is an old upright piano playing a piano-roll taken from a 1909 operetta. But only some notes get played. It sounds like John Cage or Erik Satie, and never repeats. There's a clever electronic gubbins hidden away somewhere that determines the sounds we hear. Cage would have enjoyed this.

In 2011, Wynne embarked on a series of site-specific experiments in which he restricted his palette to sound frequencies that were either very high or very low. This work was sparked by his sound design and composition for a radical production of Racine’s Andromache with Scottish director Graham McLaren during Toronto’s Luminato Festival. In adapting this experiment for the gallery context in London, Wynne explored our responses to sound in architectural spaces and to the acoustically porous boundaries between inside and outside. Daniela Cascella commented in Frieze Magazine that "The critical shift in this installation is from apparent mimesis to a subtly unfolded artifice: permeable and open, prompting hesitation, the space created by Wynne does not display the purity of acoustic phenomena but points to the singular, changing engagement with sound that occurs at different times for different listeners".

Wynne has done two collaborative projects around language endangerment. The first, Hearing Voices, is based on his recordings of speakers of highly endangered “click languages” in the Kalahari desert. An 8-channel sound installation based on these recordings, using specially made flat speakers mounted with photographs by Denise Hawrysio, showed at the Botswana National Museum, the National Art Gallery of Namibia, and SOAS (School of Oriental and African Studies) in London. A half-hour radio piece using some of the recordings was commissioned by BBC Radio 3 and won the Silver Award at the 2005 Third Coast Audio Festival in Chicago.

Wynne collaborated with photographer Tim Wainwright in 2016, when they were commissioned to help organ transplant recipients make their experiences and emotional journeys better known. Working closely over several months with patients at The Royal Free Hospital in London and Harefield Hospital in Middlesex, they developed the installation Transplant and Life for the Hunterian Museum of the Royal College of Surgeons (RCS). Gabriel Weston wrote in The Lancet that, by putting 'the testimony of patients at the centre-stage the installation was the jewel in the crown of what the RCS has to offer'.

Wynne is a professor emeritus of the University of the Arts, London.
