= Bruce Gilchrist =

British computer scientist

- Born: 4 August 1930; Pontefract, Yorkshire
- Died: 23 May 2015 (aged 84); Richmond, VA
- Education: Imperial College of Science and Technology of the University of London
- Occupations: Mathematician and engineer
- Employer(s): Institute for Advanced Study, Syracuse University, IBM, Columbia University
- Known for: Computer design and programming, calculating methodologies, Meteorology
- Parent(s): Charles Gilchrist and Edith Mawson

Bruce Gilchrist (4 August 1930 – 23 May 2015) is considered one of the notable figures in modern computing history.

== Early life and education ==
Gilchrist was born 4 August 1930 in Pontefract, Yorkshire, England and attended King Edward VII School in Kings Lynn. He harbored a keen interest in computing and computing devices from an early age.

In October 1948, after being awarded a State Scholarship, he started an accelerated applied mathematics degree course at Imperial College of Science and Technology of the University of London.

In 1951, he be able to attend a two-week course at Cambridge University given by Dr. Maurice Wilkes, the developer of the Electronic Delay Storage Automatic Calculator (EDSAC). Gilchrist recalls that "this was my first real exposure to computer programming, the problems of debugging, etc.".

In 1954, he married his first love Jean DeWolf Littlefield in Princeton, NJ. Bruce and Jean had three children: Ian, James, and Andrew.

== Institute for Advanced Study ==
In the summer of 1952, he received his doctorate in Meteorology at the University of London. That same year, with a special interest in calculating methods for weather forecasting, and with funding arranged by the mathematician John von Neumann, he joined the Institute for Advanced Study in Princeton, New Jersey supported on United States Smith-Mundt and Fulbright programs. He worked with Dr. Jule Charney, a gifted meteorologist and mathematician, on weather prediction calculations, programming the institute's IAS machine.

He also worked in the area of computers at IAS. Gilchrist first collaborated with the engineer James H. Pomerene on bettering the performance of cathode ray tube memory (the Williams tube developed first at the University of Manchester in England), writing diagnostic programs which allowed the team to make necessary adjustments for speed and reliability.

Further collaborating with Pomerene and Y.K. Wong, they invented a fast adder which incorporated a speed up technique for asynchronous adders reducing the time for additive carry-overs to propagate. This design was actually later incorporated in one commercial computer, the Philco TRANSAC S-2000, introduced in 1957, the first commercial transistorized computer.

Gilchrist was married in Princeton in April 1954 and his eldest son, Ian, was born there in February 1956.

In 1955, John von Neumann left the Institute for Advanced Study to join the United States Atomic Energy Commission (AEC) and so, in the summer of 1956, the group Gilchrist had been working with, broke up.

== Later career ==
In 1956, Gilchrist accepted an invitation to be an assistant professor of mathematics and the first director of the computer center at Syracuse University where they had ordered an IBM 650 computer which was delivered a few months after he arrived that summer.

Some time after, he also became involved with the Association for Computing Machinery (ACM) and was elected to its national Council in 1958. This volunteer work put him into contact with a wide variety of computer users across the United States.

In the spring of 1959, he was asked by Dr. Herman H. Goldstine, to join him at IBM Research as manager of the computing facility. So, Gilchrist joined IBM in 1959 where some years later he later became director of planning with its service bureau subsidiary, Service Bureau Corporation (SBC), from 1963 to 1965. From 1965 to 1968, he was a manager of IBM's Data Processing Division.

Gilchrist served as secretary (1960–1962) and vice president (1962–1964) of the Association for Computing Machinery (ACM).

In 1966 he was elected president of the American Federation of Information Processing Societies (AFIPS) and later served as its executive director from 1968 to 1973.

He later became director of the Columbia University Computer Center at Columbia University in New York City from 1973 to 1985. He was also a member of the faculty of engineering at Columbia. He retired from Columbia in 1991.

Having moved to Chappaqua, New York in 1959, he continued to be active in civic affairs, holding various positions, such as being on the Chappaqua School Board, and the Northern Westchester Board of Cooperative Educational Services, among others. From 1986-1989 he was elected supervisor of the town of New Castle, New York. In 1989, his first wife Jean died. Social Security Administration; Washington D.C., USA; Social Security Death Index, Master File}

Gilchrist lived in Chappaqua from 1959 to 2008, after which he moved to Richmond, Virginia, with his wife, Bette. He died 23 May 2015. He is survived by his three sons Ian, James, and Andrew.

Gilchrist had five grandchildren with Littlefield: Ian (spouse Kelly Murphy), Juliann, Anthony(Archaeologist), Carson, and Griffin.

== Selected publications ==
=== Ph.D. Thesis ===
- Gilchrist, Bruce, "The Application Of The Equations Of Motion To The Solution Of Climatological Problems," Ph.D. Thesis, University of London, June 1952

=== Papers ===
- Gilchrist, B.; Pomerene, J.; Wong, S.Y., "Fast carry logic for digital computers" IRE Transactions on Electronic Computers, EC-4 (Dec.1955), pp. 133–136.
- Esterin, B.; Gilchrist, B.; Pomerene, J. H., "A Note on High Speed Digital Multiplication" IRE Transactions on Electronic Computers, vol. EC-5, p. 140 (1956).
- Gilchrist, Bruce; Weber, Richard E., "Employment of trained computer personnel: a quantitative survey", New York : ACM Press, AFIPS Joint Computer Conferences archive, Proceedings of the May 16–18, 1972, Spring Joint Computer Conference, Atlantic City, New Jersey, pp. 641–648.
- Gilchrist, Bruce; Leininger, Joseph E., (editors), Proceedings of the AFIPS/Stanford Conference on Computers, Society, and Law--the Role of Legal Education, June 25–27, 1973, Montvale, N.J. : AFIPS Press, 1973.
- Gilchrist, Bruce; Shenkin, Arlaana, "The impact of scanners on employment in supermarkets", Communications of the ACM, Volume 25, Issue 7 (July 1982), New York : ACM, pp. 441–445.
- Gilchrist, Bruce, "Morality in the computer classroom", ACM SIGUCCS Newsletter, Volume 13, Issue 2 (Summer 1983), pp. 14–17
- Gilchrist, Bruce, "Remembering Some Early Computers, 1948-1960", Columbia University EPIC, 2006. Contains some autobiographical material on Gilchrist's early involvement with computing.
- Gilchrist, Bruce, "In Memoriam, James Pomerene (1920 - 2008)", New Castle Now, 6 February 2009.

=== Books ===
- Gilchrist, Bruce; Wessel, Milton R., Government regulation of the computer industry, Montvale, N.J., AFIPS Press, 1972. ISBN 0-88283-028-7
- Gilchrist, Bruce, The Descendants of CHARLES GILCHRIST and CATHERINE ROBINSON, Baltimore : Gateway Press Inc., 2004. Library of Congress Control Number 2003115956
