= Kaffe Matthews =

Kaffe Matthews is a British electronic composer and sound artist. She collaborated on the work Weightless Animals, which won a BAFTA Scotland award.

== Biography ==
Matthews is from Good Easter in Essex, England. She played the violin from the ages of 6 to 16. She returned to music a few years later when she began to play her own original material, as opposed to the written compositions she had always played on the violin.

While in college, she joined the Fabulous Dirt Sisters, an acoustic band that she traveled and played with for four years. After her time with the band, she found a job as an engineer at an acid house recording studio in Nottingham. Here she was introduced to the sampler, which she took on board. However, she was interested in the computer glitches and accidents that would produce unexpected sounds rather than in the sampler's capacity to create rhythmic music.

Initially she returned to the violin, using a midi violin and a sampler to perform. She was one of the early users of the LiSa software developed at Steim.

Her sonic armchair and sonic bed are both meant for listening to electronic music in different ways as what we are used to.

In 2013 she founded the Bicrophonic Research Institute together with Dave Griffiths. The institute is specialised in developing sonic bike projects. With the help of a GPS device, a Raspberry Pi and several loudspeakers the position of the bike determines what you are listening to. Matthews has developed sonic bikes projects all over the world, for example in Berlin, Brussels, Kijkduin, London, Magdeburg, and Porto.

Matthews holds several degrees, including a Distinction for a Masters in Music Technology, and an Honours degree in Zoology. She introduced and taught a performance technology course at Dartington College of Arts.
