= Sculpture in the City =

Annual sculpture park in the City of London

- Established: 2011
- Location: City of London
- Type: Sculpture park
- Website: Sculpture in the City

Sculpture in the City is a sculpture park that takes place every year in Aldgate, London, United Kingdom. Located in the City of London, the artworks in the open-air sculpture trail are updated annually and remain in place for the year.

Since its inception in 2011, the event has hosted 130 artworks by 113 artists at locations throughout the city.

Artists who have featured in the exhibitions include Anish Kapoor, Marina Abramović, Tracey Emin, Do Ho Suh and Ai Weiwei.

The exhibition is free to visit and accessible at any time of day.

== Description ==
Every summer Sculpture in the City shows artworks by different artists in different locations in the city, including 30 St Mary Axe, Leadenhall Market, the churchyard at St Botolph-without-Bishopsgate and 122 Leadenhall Street.

Sculpture in the city is a collaboration between Lacuna Projects and the City of London Corporation. Stella Ioannou is the director of Lacuna Projects.

Each year, 200 students from schools in and around the City of London take part in workshops to explore and creatively respond to the artworks on show.

== History ==
The 1st Edition of Sculpture in the city launched in 2011 with four artworks, by artists Anish Kapoor, Franz West, Julian Opie and Kenneth Armitage.

In 2012–13, for the 2nd Edition, the number grew to eight and featured works by Michael Craig-Martin, Tracey Emin, Yayoi Kusama, Angus Fairhurst, Dan Graham, Julian Opie and Thomas Houseago.

In 2013–14, for the 3rd Edition, the exhibition featured works by Robert Indiana, Jake & Dinos Chapman, Ryan Gander, Richard Wentworth, Keith Coventry, Antony Gormley, Shirazeh Houshiary.

In 2014–15, for the 4th Edition, work was featured from Jim Lambie, Lynn Chadwick, Julian Wild, Paul Hosking, Peter Randall-Page RA, Antony Gormley, João Onofre, Nigel Hall (sculptor), Richard Wentworth (artist), Cerith Wyn Evans, Ben Long.

In 2015-16 the 5th Edition featured Kris Martin, Laura Ford, Adam Chodzko, Folkert De Jong, Xavier Vielhan, Sigalit Landau, Ekkehard Altenburger, Tomoaki Suzuki, Keita Miyazaki, Ai Weiwei, Damien Hirst, Bruce Beasley, Shan Hur.

In 2016-17 the 6th Edition featured Gavin Turk, William Kentridge and Gerhard Marx, Lizi Sánchez, Ugo Rondinone, Recycle Group, Jürgen Partenheimer, Huma Bhabha, Antony Caro, Benedetto Pietromarchi, Michael Lyons, Mat Collishaw, Jaume Plensa, Giuseppe Penone, Petroc Sesti, Shan Hur, Sarah Lucas, Enrico David.

In 2017-18 the 7th Edition featured Gavin Turk, Mark Wallinger, Martin Creed, Ryan Gander, Nathaniel Rackowe, Recycle Group, Paul McCarthy, Daniel Buren, Fernando Casasempere, Karen Tang, Kevin Killen, Mhairi Vari, Gary Webb, Damien Hirst, Bosco Sodi, Peter Randall-Page RA.

In 2018–19, the 8th Edition featured David Annesely, Richard Rome, Gabriel Lester, Tracey Emin, Claire Jarrett, Juliana Cerqueira Leite, Michail Pirgelis, Miroslaw Balka, Karen Tang, Sarah Lucas, Amanda Lwin, Shaun C. Badham, Sean Scully RA, Thomas J. Price, Jyll Bradley, Jean-Luc Moulène, Nancy Rubins, Marina Abramović, Doh Ho Suh

In 2019-21 the 9th Edition featured Kevin Francis Gray, Do Ho Suh, Michael Lyons, Leo Fitzmaurice, Nancy Rubins, Salvatore Arancio, Nina Saunders, Lawrence Weiner, Patrick Tuttofuoco, Shaun C. Badham, Marisa Ferreira, Jennifer Steinkamp, Nathan Coley, Juliana Cerqueira Leite, Jyll Bradley, Claire Jarrett, Reza Aramesh, Elisa Artesero, Jonathan Trayte

In 2019, Sculpture in the city launched on Google Arts and Culture, allowing users to virtually tour the artworks.

In 2021–22, the 10th Edition featured Alice Channer, Ruth Ewan, Isabella Martin, Mike Ballard, Oliver Bragg, Mark Handforth, Eva Rothschild, Laura Arminda Kingsley, Tatiana Wolska, Guillaume Vandame, Bram Ellens, Jake Elwes, Jun T. Lai, Regitze Engelsborg Karlsen, Almuth Tebbenhoff, Ro Roberston, Laure Provost, Elisa Artesero

In 2022–23, the 11th edition featured work by Emma Louise Moore, Sarah Lucas, Victor Seaward, Shezad Dawood, Oliver Bragg, Pedro Pires, Jesse Pollock, Ugo Rondinone, Emma Smith, Bosco Sodi, Claudia Wieser, Mike Ballard, Alice Channer, Bram Ellens Jun T. Lai Eva Rothschild and Guillaume Vandame.

In 2023, the 12th edition featured works by Simeon Barclay, Oliver Bragg, Jocelyn McGregor, Phyllida Barlow, Arturo Herrera, Vanessa da Silva, Larry Bell, Rafael D’Aló, Isamu Noguchi, Mika Rottenberg, Emma Louise Moore, Pedro Pires, Jesse Pollock, Ugo Rondinone, Victor Lim Seaward Emma Smith and Elisa Artesero.

The 13th edition featured works by Vanessa da Silva, Richard Mackness, Victor Lim Seaward, Julian Opie, Oliver Bragg, Ida Ekblad, Hilary Jack, Arturo Herrera, Seph Li, Daniel Silver, Jesse Pollock, Maya Rose Edwards, Samuel Ross, Clare Burnett, and Elisa Artesero.

== Aldgate Square Commission ==
A new biannual art commission for Aldgate Square was announced by Sculpture in the city, to support emerging artists in the UK. Jocelyn McGregor's artwork was unveiled in May 2022, and will be followed by Emii Alrai's sculpture.

== See also ==
- List of public art in the City of London – for permanent sculptures in the area
