= Grundy (surname) =

Grundy is a surname of French origin, common around Manchester, England.

== People with the surname ==
- Anthony Grundy (1979–2019), American basketball player
- Bill Grundy (1923–1993), British television presenter in the 1970s
- Brodie Grundy (born 1994), Australian rules football player
- Edward Grundy (1795–1875), politician and editor in Australia
- Emily Grundy (born 1955), British demographer and academic
- Eustace B. Grundy (1848–1938), lawyer in South Australia
- Felix Grundy (1777–1840), U.S. politician
- Frances Grundy (born 1942), British computer scientist
- George Grundy (1859–1945), English cricketer
- George Beardoe Grundy (1861–1948), English historian
- Harry Grundy (footballer, born 1883) (1883–1948), English footballer
- Harry Grundy (footballer, born 1893) (1893–1979), English footballer
- Hugh Grundy (born 1945), English drummer (The Zombies)
- Jimmy Grundy (politician) (1923–2020), American politician
- Joseph Ridgway Grundy (1863–1961), American industrialist and politician
- Mark Grundy, English educationalist
- Patrick Michael Grundy (1917–1959; a.k.a. P. M. Grundy), English mathematician known for the Sprague–Grundy theorem
- Paul Grundy, American physician
- Paul Grundy (engineer) (1935–2013), Australian engineer
- Rebecca Grundy (born 1990), English cricketer
- Reg Grundy (1923–2016), Australian television producer
- Scott M. Grundy (1933–2025), American cardiologist and researcher
- Stephan Grundy (born 1967), American author of saga retellings
- Sydney Grundy (1848–1914), English dramatist

== See also ==
- Gundry
