= Gundi (disambiguation) =

A Gundi is a small, stocky rodent found in Africa.

Gundi may also refer to:

- Common gundi, North African gundi
- Gundi, Bihar, Indian village
- Gundi Busch (1935–2014), German figure skater
- Gundi Ellert (born in 1951), German television actress
- Gundi, nickname of German musician Gerhard Gundermann
- Gundi, nickname of Bulgarian footballer Georgi Asparuhov
- Gundi: Legend of Love, a 2024 biopic film about the Bulgarian footballer

== See also ==
- Gundy (disambiguation)
- Gund (disambiguation)
- Grundy (disambiguation)
