= James Grundy =

James Grundy may refer to:

- James Grundy (chess player) (1855–1919), English-American chess master
- James Grundy (cricketer) (1824–1873), English cricketer
- James Grundy (politician) (born 1978), British politician
- Jimmy Grundy (James Caldwell Grundy Jr., 1923–2020), American politician and businessman
