= Channer =

Channer is a surname. Notable people with the surname include:

- Alice Channer (born 1977), British sculptor
- Colin Channer (born 1963), Jamaican writer
- George Channer (1842–1905), recipient of the Victoria Cross
- Grace Channer (born 1959), African-Canadian artist
- Harold Channer (1935–2020), American interviewer on Manhattan Neighborhood Network from 1973 to 2011
