= Salmagundi (disambiguation) =

Salmagundi is a salad dish that originated in England.

Salmagundi (meaning "a hodgepodge") may also refer to:

- Salmagundi (magazine), a quarterly periodical of the Humanities and Social Sciences
- Salmagundi (periodical), a 19th-century satirical periodical
- Salmagundi is the title of the Colgate University yearbook
- Salmagundy is the title of the school newspaper at Miss Porter's School, Connecticut.
- Salmagundi Club, an art club in New York City

== See also ==
- Solomon Grundy (disambiguation)
- Solomon Gundy
