= Harry Grundy =

Harry Grundy may refer to:

- Harry Grundy (footballer, born 1883) (1883–1948), English footballer for Everton and Lincoln City
- Harry Grundy (footballer, born 1893) (1893–1979), English footballer for Oldham Athletic
