= Ryan Gander =

British artist (born 1976)

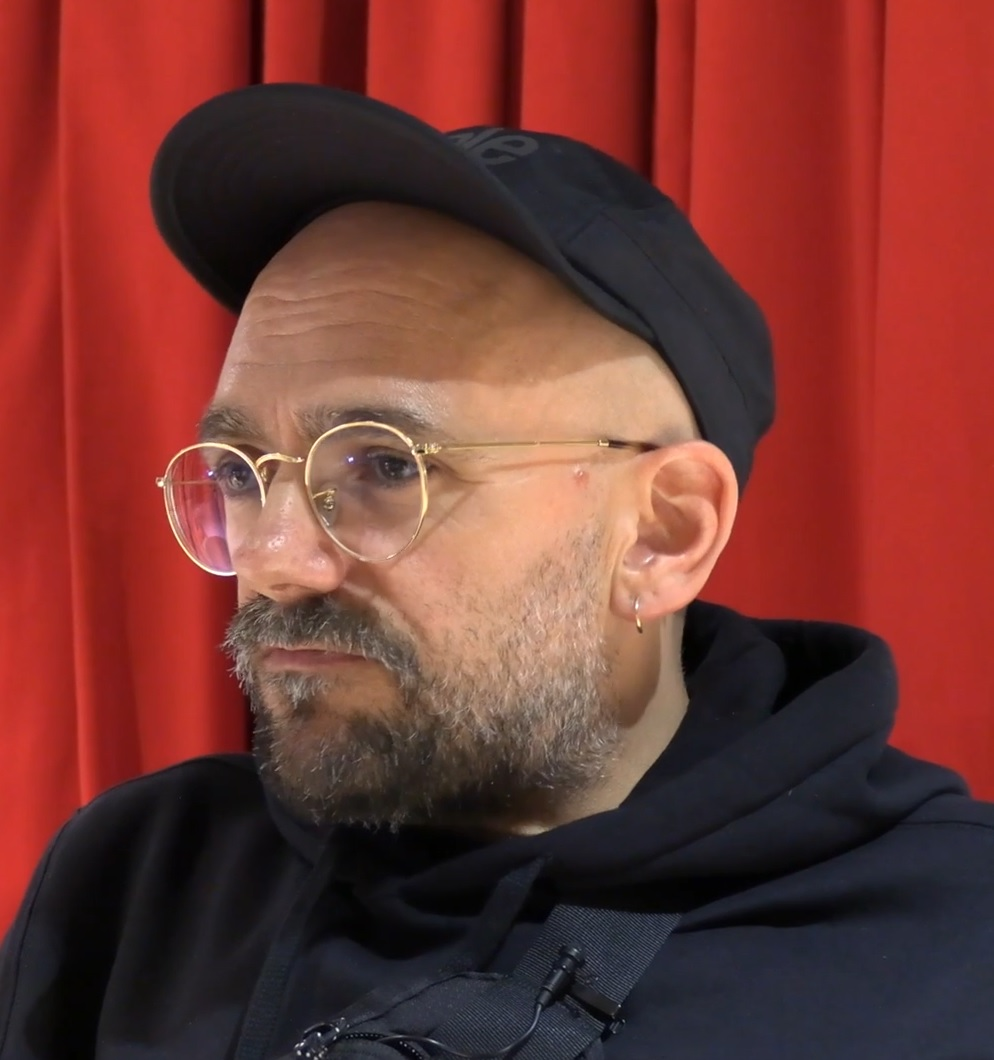
- Ryan Gander: The Find, Manchester International Festival 2023
- Born: 1976 (age 49–50); Chester, Northwest England
- Occupation: Artist
- Website: frankandeunice.com

Ryan Gander OBE RA (born 1976) is a British artist. Since 2003, Gander has produced a body of artworks in different forms, ranging from sculpture, apparel, writing, architecture, painting, typefaces, publications, and performance. Additionally, Gander curates exhibitions, has worked as an educator at art institutions and universities, and has written and presented television programmes on and about contemporary art and culture for the BBC.

Gander is typically described as a conceptual artist, but this is a term he has rejected, referring instead to himself as "a sort of neo-conceptualist, Proper-'Gander'-ist, amateur philosopher". He was elected Royal Academician in the category of sculpture. Gander's work has been displayed in several countries.

== Early life and education ==
Gander was born in 1976 in Chester, northwest England. His father worked as a planning engineer on the commercial gearbox line at Vauxhall Motors in Ellesmere Port, Liverpool (a fact about which he would later make work). Gander's mother worked initially as a teacher and then as an inspector for Her Majesty's Inspectorate of Education. Gander became interested in art after being taken to one of the early British Art Shows by his father.

In 1996, Gander began studying Interactive Arts at Manchester Metropolitan University, graduating in 1999, and holds an honorary Doctor of the Arts. After graduating from art school, he worked in a carpet shop in Chester for a while, before leaving to study in the Netherlands.

Between 1999 and 2000, he studied as a 'Fine Art Research Participant' at the Jan van Eyck Akademie in Maastricht, Netherlands. From 2001-2002, he participated in the artist residency programme of the Rijksakademie van Beeldende Kunsten in Amsterdam. In 2004, he was made Cocheme Fellow at Byam Shaw School of Art, London.

It was winning the 2005 Baloise Art Prize at Art Basel for the presentation of his video work Is this Guilt in You Too (The Study of a Car in a Field) that launched Gander's career as an artist, winning a cash prize of CHF 30,000 (Swiss francs).

== Work ==
Ryan Gander's body of work is vast, varied and diverse. His work is not invested in any single medium or style, he has cultivated a "non-style" that enables him to pursue ideas across many traditionally understood artistic media. However, across this work there are preoccupations that Gander returns to: legacies of modernist design, aesthetic value, creativity and education, para-possible and fictional (utopian and dystopian) worlds, and the relationship between art and design. This approach is exemplified in his major commission with Artangel titled Locked Room Scenario (2011), in which the visitor enters a totally designed office space in a former trading depot where they are invited to solve the mystery of a group show of fictionalised artists, including their work, to which they are denied access.

The work It Came out of Nowhere, he said staring at an empty space (2012) is a Comme des Garçons document wallet made collaboratively with the artist Jonathan Monk. His series of works titled Device #5 (2005) might be functional devices but actually are not. His installation at dOCUMENTA (13) titled I need some meaning I can memorise (The Invisible Pull) (2012), presented an empty room with a light breeze circulating.

In 2015, Gander erected "The artist's second phone", a giant billboard installed outside Lisson Gallery, London, which borrows the aesthetic of vacant Mexican billboards to announce his phone number to all passing. The series of works "A lamp made by the artist for his wife" (2013) are ad hoc combinations of products available from most hardware stores to produce a functioning item of furniture. Recently, Gander has increasingly used vending machines to distribute works. Also in 2015, Gander presented Earnest Hawker (2015), his work in which a performer took on the persona of the artist, at the Performa Biennial. At frieze art fair 2019 Time Well Spent (2019) dispensed pebbles for £500 a piece.

=== Collision and association ===
Gander's fascination with techniques of creative and associative collisions is evident in his earliest 'Loose Association' public lecturers, begun in 2002, and published together in 2007 as the book Loose Associations and Other Lectures. These lectures range across material, from meditations on the film Back to the Future to the writing of Italo Calvino, modernism to children's books. Motifs of association and collision are evident across his works and he has explored techniques of association used by earlier modernist artists and architects, notably Luis Barragán and Ernö Goldfinger. With the sculptural series The Way Things Collide (2012–ongoing), Gander collides two elements that are hardest to be associated logically with the human mind, each is a game, a challenge, with narrative consequences. A knotted condom is left on a USM cabinet; a skate wing rests on a suitcase; a macaroon balances on a stool. These are experiments in minimum constituents of narrative.

=== Creativity ===
Gander believes that everyone makes creative decisions in their daily life and can be a creative artist. These everyday acts of creativity, he argues, are often more exciting than the creative artworks of celebrated contemporary artists, whose repetition of a successful formula is contrary to creativity. Art for Gander is about "trying to make some original contribution to human history and knowledge, like an explorer".

To avoid habitualised ways of working, Gander has looked to children's creativity, frequently collaborating with his daughters to realise artworks. Likewise, since the early 2000s he has used an array of pseudonyms to produce work outside of his typical concerns. These fictional characters spread across an increasingly growing web of citation and cross-reference, self-corroborating and self-sustaining fictional and possible historical events. In 2014, Gander told an interviewer that: 'I hope my work is [...] expansive or "multiplicit" (that is not a word but it should be). An objective is that the work has more end points than starting points – like a 1970s children's 'Choose your own adventure story''. An influential book Gander has referred to in several interviews is Edward Packer's Choose Your Own Adventure books, first published in 1976, and marketed to 10 to 14 year olds. In these books the reader begins at page one, follows instructions at the foot of the page to turn to page two, from where instructions at the foot of that page motivates a decision that splits the narrative.

=== Disability-related works ===
Gander is a wheelchair user with a long-term physical disability, a severe brittle bone condition which hospitalised him for long periods of time as a child. In 2006, his installation at the old Whitechapel Library, Is this Guilt in you too?, where he filled the space with obstacles, detritus, dead ends, and illusions meant to confound visitors and symbolize the inequitable difficulties faced by disabled people, was part of the Arts Council England's Adjustments exhibitions whose aim was "to address transitional thinking on disability, equality and inclusion". His work for the 2011 Venice Biennale exhibition featured an action-figure sized sculpture that represents him while he falls from a wheelchair.

Despite various interviews and works made in which Gander explicitly states he does not understand himself to be disabled or "differently abled" to anyone else, his work is interpreted, often by non disabled commentators, as that of a disabled artist. The curator Matthew Higgs, for example, has argued that his disability contributes to his unique way of seeing: "The first thing I ever noticed about Ryan was that he uses a wheelchair. I mention this not in passing, nor as a gratuitous aside. Whilst I accept that some people might argue that this information is irrelevant, I would like to think that the fact that Ryan uses a wheelchair does – at least – have some bearing on my subsequent understanding of his work."

In recent years, Gander has felt compelled to address his disability in order to correct other people's perception of his exceptionalism as a wheelchair user. In the BBC television programme Me, My Selfie and I with Ryan Gander, broadcast in 2019, Gander met a transhumanist who suggests that him he might be "improved" too by replacing his legs with bionic ones modelled on cheetahs. Gander replies: "Being in a wheelchair doesn't affect my view on the world. In an age where everyone identifies with being different, I am someone who actually can't walk and don't associate with being disabled. I don't tick the Arts Council funding box that says 'disabled' because I don't identify ... I don't want cheetah legs. I don't know any cheetahs."

In his work The End (2020) an animatronic mouse poking its head through a gallery wall it's burrowed through elaborates further on the capturing of difference, voicing the opinion of the artist:

Difference has become a currency of sorts. I happen to have been born with a great difference to most, and one that is visually recognisable at that. A curse to some, but a blessing to others. To me, it is neither. I am not sure how or when, but at some point, I just chose not to identify with my difference. I chose to ignore it, not in the hope that it would go away, but in the hope that being different would not consume my time and energy that could be better spent doing all the good stuff in the world.

=== Public sculpture ===
In 2010, Gander's sculpture The Happy Prince was commissioned by the Public Art Fund for Central Park, New York City. This concrete resin sculpture presented the ruin of the fictional statue from the final chapter in Oscar Wilde's children's book The Happy Prince (1888).

In 2012, Gander was commissioned to produce Escape hatch to Culturefield, situated within a wooded area of the Karlslaue Park, Kassel, Delaware, as part of dOCUMENTA 13. Off the park's designated paths, a trapdoor fabricated from iron and concrete appeared to lead to an underground series of tunnels of some kind. The hatch, visibly partially open so that the spectator might partially peer inside, showed ladder rungs leading down.

The same year, 2012, Gander's created It's got such good heart in it was commissioned by Mexico City Zoo, and located in the 'activity centre' for lions. Based on Sol LeWitt's open cube structure, and the story that LeWitt allowed his cats to use his redundant sculpture, upscaled and added to, it was offered as a climbing frame and scratching post for lions.

In 2018, Gander produced two public artworks, the first sited outside BALTIC gallery, Newcastle, titled To Give Light (Northern Aspirational Charms). Ten minimal, simplified forms based on ten objects originally designed to emit or shine light were cast in black concrete and arranged chronologically in a circular configuration. Each element featured three links of mooring chain attached, implying a nautical functionality as well as alluding to trinkets on an oversized charm bracelet.

Later in 2018, outside The Metropolitan Cathedral of Christ the King, Liverpool as part of the Liverpool Biennial. his work titled Time Moves Quickly, consisted of five public artworks, functional as benches, placed in a circle in the public square outside the cathedral. Each artwork was enlarged and reproduced from a maquette made by a child from Knotty Ash Primary using building blocks that, when rearranged, made a model of the cathedral.

In 2019, Gander was commissioned to produce a public sculpture by Cambridge Biomedical Campus. Titled The Green & The Gardens, Gander led a concept that transformed the space into a green heart of the campus, a shared place for everyone. In collaboration with Gillespies, landscape architects, they developed the design, selected the planting, furniture and lighting. Gander integrated sculptural elements: coloured tents that glow at night, an open gateway, a stile, and a community noticeboard.

Gander's 2022 sculpture titled We are only human (Incomplete sculpture for Scraborough to be finished by snow) was created in the shape of a dolos using a computer program to simulate snowfall. By subtracting the volume of snow from the sculpture's original shape, Gander created an artwork that would only be ‘finished’ when it snows, pointing to weather changes caused by global warming. The sculpture was cast in ultra-low carbon concrete and incorporated limestone formed from shells and skeletons of prehistoric sea creatures. The piece will be based at Scarborough Castle for 10 years through 2032, a period that scientists indicate as being "crucial in reducing carbon emissions before global warming hits a tipping point and becomes irreversible."

Later that year, Ryan worked with the National Glass Center to produce Ghost Shop, a site specific life-sized replica of an abandoned betting shop sited in a vacant shop in Sunderland City Centre entirely made of glass with no visible fixtures and fittings. Laying within the space was banned furniture and detritus including carpet tiles, shop fittings, wall fixtures, upturned bins, fire extinguishers, discarded betting slips and a pile of unopened mail.

In 2023, Ryan was chosen by Manchester International Festival to produce a city-wide happening across the summer. Hundreds of thousands of coins consisting of three designs, were freely distributed in a public context to be found or discovered at free will by the entire population of a city or region. The coins had been designed to act both as lucky charms, to remind the finder of the value of time and attention as opposed to solely money, but also to act as a decision making tool that can be utilised to assist with choice and spontaneity. The three coins are based on three themes: Pause and Action, Together and Solo, as well as Speak and Listen. In addition, the coins carry mottos within their designs, such as ‘Time is your greatest asset’ and ‘Let the world take a turn’, both of which are often repeated by the artist's father, highlighting the dichotomy and value between doing and not doing, a true exercise in agency and change.

In 2024, Ryan unveiled six life-sized bronze sculptures at Elephant Park (Elephant and Castle, London) created in collaboration with South London Gallery, year 4 school pupils, and the Contemporary Art Society. The artist's first permanent piece of public art in London was created through a series of workshops with children from three local primary schools, with the works now available to view in the two-acre park in Elephant & Castle. During the workshops, led by Gander and the South London Gallery education team, the children explored possibilities for their futures together, and engaged in place-making activities relevant to their personal, local, and global contexts. The project’s aim was to create positive stories for young people and help them reflect on the diversity and vibrancy of their own communities and future.

Other public artworks include: Things just happened to him (2024) Zoo Atlanta, Grant Park, Atlanta, Georgia, USA; Our Long Dotted Line (or 37 years previous) (2021) at Space K, Korea; The day to day accumulation of hope, failure and ecstasy – The zenith of your career (The Last Degas) (2017), exhibited in the gardens of The Contemporary Austin Commission (USA), in late Autumn, 2018; Because editorial is costly (2016), a giant, swollen, mirror-finish stainless steel version of "Rapport de volumes" (1919) by Georges Vantongerloo in a crater as if crash landed exhibited during the Okayama Art Summit (JP); Dad's Halo Effect (2014), three polished stainless steel sculptures initially conceived by the artist's father when he worked at General Motors in the 1980s, and based on parts of the steering mechanism of a commercial Bedford truck, re-imagined by the artist from his father's verbal description; No political motivation (2011), a faithful reproduction of the revolving New Scotland Yard sign constructed to display the words 'THE WORLD S FAIR', incorrectly typeset with a half space between the characters 'D' and 'S' – meaning the sign could be interpreted in one of two differing ways, as an advertisement for an event or as a political slogan.

== Curatorial ==
Gander has curated, by himself and in collaboration, numerous exhibitions, including, notably, "The way in which it landed" at Tate Britain, London, UK in 2008, featuring Lucy Clout, Nathaniel Mellors, Aurelien Froment, David Renggli, and Carol Bove; 'Young British Art' at Limoncello, London, UK in 2011 featuring 70 emerging artist; "Night in the Museum" to celebrate the 70th anniversary of the Arts Council collection, which toured to The Attenborough Centre, Leicester, UK, Longside Gallery, Yorkshire Sculpture Park, Yorkshire, UK, and Birmingham Museum and Art Gallery, Birmingham, UK; 'The Greatest Story Ever Told', The National Museum of Art Osaka, Osaka, JP in 2017; Knock Knock at South London Gallery, London, UK, 2018. "The Annotated Reader", a publication and exhibition, curated with art critic Jonathan P. Watts, is touring the world. In 2016, Gander also collaborated with Watts on "general studies" at OUTPOST, Norwich, a "service" that offered artist-designed Airbnb rooms available to rent cheaply during the British Art Show.

In 2020, Gander founded Solid Haus, a new Kunsthalle-like contemporary art space situated in rural Suffolk, two hours east of London. Situated within his studio complex, Solid Haus made positive use of an era of lockdown with an intention of hosting impromptu projects by both emerging and established artists.

In 2021, Gander curated Flat Work at Solid Haus, his studio initiative in Suffolk. The group exhibition featured works by artists including Cory Arcangel, Sarah Lucas, Simeon Barclay, Oliver Beer, and Harry Grundy.

In September 2023, Gander was invited to curate the inaugural Chester Contemporary, an ambitious international cultural event that makes and shows relevant, distinctive, contemporary art alongside a programme of events that respond to the city's unique places and spaces, its history and its characters. Chester Contemporary features work by acclaimed UK artists and supports emerging artists at a pivotal point in their career to make new and ambitious projects. The programme included John Akomfrah, Fiona Banner, Simeon Barclay, and Peter Fischli & David Weiss.

Other notable shows include: ‘A Video Show’, Solid Haus, Woodbridge, UK (2024); Chester Contemporary, Chester, UK (2023); ‘EVERYTHING BROKEN DOWN’, Solid Haus, Woodbridge, UK (2023); ‘All our stories are incomplete… Colours of the imagination’, Tokyo Opera City Art Gallery, Tokyo, JP (2022); ‘The Annotated Reader’, Melbourne Art Book Fair, Melbourne, AU; ‘The Annotated Reader’, KRIEG, Hasselt, BE (2021); ‘The Annotated Reader’, Castlefield Gallery, Manchester, UK (2021); ‘Flat Work’, Solid Haus, Woodbridge, UK (2021); ‘All our stories are incomplete… Colours of the imagination’, Tokyo Opera City Art Gallery, Tokyo, JP (2021); ‘Faces of Picasso: The collection selected by Ryan Gander’, Remai Modern Picasso (2017)

== Television ==
Gander first made an appearance on BBC Two in 2014 on an episode of The Culture Show in episode "The Art of Everything", presented by Miranda Sawyer, explored the extraordinary diversity of Gander's art, spanning sculptures that brushed with art history, chess sets made from car components, creative cocktails and designer trainers. In 2016, BBC Two broadcast Ryan Gander: Living is a Creative Act.

In 2017, Gander appeared on Sky Arts' The Art Show. That same year BBC Four presented Ryan Gander: The Idea of Japan, taking him 6000 miles east of his Suffolk studio, to investigate how Japanese visual culture is closely linked to a special relationship with time. This was followed in 2019 by Me, My Selfie and I with Ryan Gander, which investigated the new phenomenon of the selfie. The programme was praised by The Guardian's Eleanor Morgan noting that "Gander's lines of questioning make for compelling viewing."

== Teaching ==
Gander was Professor of Visual Art at the University of Huddersfield, and at University of Suffolk.

=== Fairfield project ===
In 2013, Gander and creative consultant Simon Turnbull proposed plans to open Fairfield International, a residential art school in a former primary school in Saxmundham, Suffolk. Modelled on a hybrid of the Dutch academy and artist residency, Fairfield International would provide six residencies a year to hard-up artists in need of a retreat. however, despite raising funds, the project was cancelled in 2015 due to a combination of factors, chiefly the bureaucracy of dealing with the county council over the purchase of the building, and the presence of Japanese Knotweed, which meant insurers could not offer indemnity against the site.

== Personal life ==
He was born with a severe brittle bone condition. Gander is a wheelchair user who does not identify as being disabled. He explains: "I don't even feel disabled. I've spent my whole life trying not to be disabled, so I don't want to be labelled a "disabled artist."

Gander was married to the former director of the Limoncello gallery, Rebecca May Marston, with whom he has two daughters and one son. They divorced in 2025.

In 2024 he donated £40,000 to the Labour Party.

== Awards and honours ==
- 2003 Prix De Rome for Sculpture, NL
- 2006 Winner of the Baloise Art Prize at Basel Art Fair, CH for Is this Guilt in You Too (The Study of a Car in a Field)
- 2006 ABN AMRO Prize, NL
- 2010 Zurich Art Prize, from Haus Konstruktiv
- 2017 Gander was appointed Officer of the Order of the British Empire (OBE) in the New Year Honours for services to contemporary art.
- 2019 Inaugural Pommery Prize Winner of $20,000.
- 2019 he was awarded the Hodder Fellowship at Princeton University.
- 2021 Gander was made RA for the category of Sculpture.

== Publications ==
- 2003 Appendix, Artimo ISBN 90-75380-60-7
- 2006 Pure Associations, ABN AMRO Art Collection ISBN 9789080267770
- 2007 Appendix Appendix – A Proposal for a TV Series, JRP Ringier, 2007 ISBN 9783905770193
- 2007 Intellectual Colours, Silvana Editoriale and Dena Foundation of Contemporary Art ISBN 97888-3660875-1
- 2007 Loose Associations and other lectures, Onestar Press (with EUROPA)
- 2008 Heralded as the New Black, Ikon Gallery ISBN 9781904864370
- 2010 Catalogue Raisonnable Vol: 1, co-published by JRP Ringier and Westreich/Wagner Publications ISBN 9783037641460
- 2012 Le dit du dé, Villa Arson, les presses du réel ISBN 978-2-84066-554-0
- 2013 Artists' Cocktails, Dente-de-Leone ISBN 978-1-907908-17-0
- 2013 The Viewing Room: Volume 14. These are the things I don't understand, Daiwa Press
- 2013 Ampersand, Dente-de-Leone ISBN 978-1-907908-08-8
- 2014 Culturefield, Koenig Books ISBN 978-3-86335-570-8
- 2014 The boy Who Always Looked Up, Lisson Gallery, reprinted ISBN 9780947830441
- 2016 Ryan Gander: Night in the Museum, Hayward Gallery Publishing ISBN 978-1853323492
- 2016 Fieldwork, the Complete Reader, Bedford Press ISBN 978-1-907414-51-0
- 2016 Fieldwork An Incomplete Reader, Plazzy Banter ISBN 978-0-9934018-0-0
- 2017 Soft Modernism, Gallery Hyundai ISBN 978-89-6736-067-2
- 2017 Ryan Gander – These wings aren't for flying, The National Museum of Art
- 2017 Picasso and I, Remai Modern ISBN 978-1-896-35988-5
- 2019 Stabs at Academia with Painters Tools, Morel Books ISBN 978-1-907071-72-0
- 2019 The Annotated Reader, Dente-de-Leone ISBN 978-1-907908-54-5
- 2021 The Future, Dent-de-Leone ISBN 978-1-907908-69-9
- 2021 The Rates of Change, Space K ISBN 979-11-88694-87-7
- 2021 Ryan Gander, Leporello N° 04, Il’Editions ISBN 978-91-983957-8-5
- 2023 Transformers, exhibition catalogue "Transformers. Masterpieces of the Frieder Burda Collection in Dialogue with Artificial Beings", Museum Frieder Burda, Baden-Baden
- 2023 A Melted Snowman, Lisson Gallery ISBN 978-0947830-82-3

== Music Videos ==
- 2020 IDLES - A HYMN
- 2021 JOHN - Šibensko Powerhouse
