= Simeon Barclay =

British artist (born 1975)

Simeon Barclay (born 1975) is a British multi-media artist. Born in Huddersfield, he studied at Leeds Metropolitan University (now Leeds Beckett University), and Goldsmiths College in London. His has been exhibited at venues including Cubitt Gallery, South London Gallery, Tate Britain, Yorkshire Sculpture Park, and the Institute of Contemporary Arts.

== Early life and education ==
Barclay was born in Huddersfield, Yorkshire in 1975. While studying art in night school, he worked in manufacturing. In 2010 he received his degree from Leeds Metropolitan University (now Leeds Beckett University), and he subsequently graduated from Goldsmiths College in London in 2014.

== Career ==
Barclay works in various mediums including live performance, sculpture, painting, and neons. His work addresses topics including gender expectations, race, unemployment, and British working class masculinity, ideas of belonging.

Barclay's first solo exhibition in London was held at Cubitt Gallery in 2016. The next year he exhibited The Hero Wears Clay Shoes at Tate Britain. In 2020 his work was included in the British Art Show 9.

Barclay's 2021 show, England’s Lost Camelot, focused on themes of black political resistance and folklore.

His show In The Name Of The Father was exhibited at South London Gallery in 2022. Eddy Frankel, Art & Culture Editor for Time Out magazine, wrote that the exhibition works to make the viewer feel the sense of alienation and exclusion that Barclay experienced growing up black in the north of England. It included the work Pittu Pithu Pitoo, described by Art Monthly as "a giant pile of boulders" that obstructs the view into the exhibition. When the work was included in London's Sculpture in the City in 2023, Frankel described the "sculpture of a chicken on its own little mini-mountain" as symbolising being an outsider, and a character on the periphery that isn't accepted. The work was unveiled as a new addition to Yorkshire Sculpture Park in 2024. Its form and title reference an Indian game, involving a ball and a pile of seven stones, played by the artist in his youth.

Barclay's first performance work, The Ruin, took place at London's Institute of Contemporary Arts in January 2025. It was commissioned by the Roberts Institute of Art. Featuring Barclay's spoken words, plus musical accompaniment from horns and percussion, it dealt with the artist's memories of growing up in 1980s Huddersfield. Frieze magazine described it as adding "visceral intimacy and vulnerability" to Barclay's practice. This performance led to Barclay being nominated for the 2026 Turner Prize.

As part of the Coventry Biennial 2025, Simeon Barclay was commissioned to curate the exhibition Kinda Blu, with work drawn exclusively from the Arts Council Collection.
