= Aïshti =

Lebanese department store chain

- Founded: 1989
- Founder: Tony Salamé
- Area served: Lebanon, Jordan
- Number of employees: 900 (2020)
- Parent: Tony Salamé Group
- Website: aishti.com

Aïshti is an upmarket Lebanese department store chain founded in 1989. The company operates both Aïshti and Aïzone brands across Lebanon and Jordan. In 2016 the company recorded an annual revenue of $250 million.

== History ==
Aïshti was founded in 1989 by Tony Salamé. It began as a small store selling Italian jeans and clothing in Jal el Dib.

In September 2020 the new Aïshti store designed by Zaha Hadid under construction in Beirut Souks caught on fire.

=== Store locations and timeline ===
As of 2026, Aïshti operates four stores in Lebanon, along with one international branch in Amman, Jordan. Aïshti also operates Aïshti Minis a children's clothing store in Beirut (Achrafieh and Downtown) and Antelias (By The Sea).

Aïshti stores permanently closed
Aïshti stores currently in operation
Aïshti stores planned to open

==== Lebanon ====
Metropolitan area ("metro")	Suburb or Neighborhood	Name/Location/Notes	Size	Opened	Closed
Beirut	Rue Verdun	Aïshti Verdun Dunes Center. Store relocated to ABC Verdun.		1997	2024
Beirut	Downtown	Aïshti Downtown Flagship location: 71 El-Moutrane Street.		1999	open
Matn	Antelias	Aïshti By The Sea Seaside Road. Designed by Adjaye Associates.	35,000 m^{2} (376,737 sq ft)	2015	open
Kfardebian	Faqra	Aïshti Faqra Faqra Club. Open on a seasonal schedule. Includes an Aïshti Spa.		2020	open
Beirut	Rue Verdun	Aïshti Verdun ABC Verdun, relocated from Dunes Center.		2024	open
Beirut	Beirut Souks	Aïshti Beirut Souks Surrounded by Mir Majid Arslan Avenue, Rue Patriarch Hoyek, and Rue Fakhry Bey. Designed by Zaha Hadid.		TBA	

==== International ====
Metropolitan area ("metro")	Suburb or Neighborhood	Name/Location/Notes	Size	Opened	Closed
Kuwait City, Kuwait	Rai	Aïshti Kuwait Located at The Avenues.		2009	
Amman, Jordan	Abdoun	Aïshti Amman Located at TAJ Lifestyle Center.		2023	open

== Aïzone ==
=== Stores ===
==== Operating ====
- Amman (City Mall), Jordan – Opened in 2006.
- Amman (TAJ Lifestyle Center), Jordan
- Antelias (By The Sea), Lebanon
- Beirut (Achrafieh), Lebanon
- Beirut (Downtown), Lebanon
- Beirut (Rue Verdun), Lebanon
- Dbayeh, Lebanon
- Faraya, Lebanon – Opened in 2020.

==== Closed ====
- Dubai, United Arab Emirates – Opened in 2005 at the Mall of the Emirates.

== Other operations ==
=== Aïshti Foundation ===
The Aïshti Foundation is a 350,000-square-foot mixed art gallery and retail space located north of Beirut in Jal el Dib, Lebanon. The Aishti Foundation was constructed on behalf of Aishti CEO Tony Salamé, and designed by architect David Adjaye and interiors by Christian Lahoude Studio. It opened in 2015 and houses over 2,000 works from Tony and Elham Salamé's personal collection. Construction took three years to complete and the cost of construction is estimated to be over $100 million.

The inaugural exhibition, entitled “New Skin,” was curated by Massimiliano Gioni and features work from notable artists such as Alice Channer, Sterling Ruby and Danh Voh, as well as figures from the Arte Povera movement such as Giuseppe Penone.

In 2024 the foundation presented the Day for Night: New American Realism exhibition at the Gallerie Nazionali d'Arte Antica in Rome, Italy curated by Massimiliano Gioni and Flaminia Gennari Santori.

=== Magazines ===
In 2009 through the Tony Salamé Group, L'Officiel Levant was launched as the local edition of L'Officiel for Lebanon and Syria, it was published in French. It was distributed in bookstores, luxury hotels and Aïshti stores. The magazines editor-in-chief from 2009 to 2019 was Fifi Abou Dib (who previously worked for L'Orient-Le Jour). In 2019 the magazine ceased publication after ten years.

They also operated A Magazine an English-language publication about fashion which closed in 2019 and Gossip which ceased publication in 2012.

=== Other stores ===
They also operate boutiques in Beirut for Bulgari, Burberry, Cartier, Dior, Dolce & Gabbana, Fendi, Gucci, Loro Piana, Roberto Cavalli, Valentino and Zegna.

== Tony Salamé ==
Tony Salamé is a Lebanese-Italian businessman and art collector, as well as the founder, CEO and chairman of Aishti. In 1995, he built Aishti into Lebanon's foremost luxury department store with a flagship store in Beirut's Downtown Souks.

=== Art collection ===
Salamé owns around 2,500 works by over 150 artists. He works closely with New York art dealer Jeffrey Deitch, and began buying art in 2003, first acquiring Arte Povera works by Penone, Lucio Fontana and others.

According to Gioni, the associate director and director of exhibitions at the New Museum in New York, there has been “a sudden acceleration of the [Salamé] collection in the past ten years." The main focus of his collection is 21st century art.

=== Italian Order of Merit ===
In March 2015 Salamé was awarded the Order of Merit of the Italian Republic, Italy's highest honor, by the Italian Embassy in Beirut at an event attended by diplomats, business partners and family.

=== Personal life ===
He is married to Elham Salamé; they have four children: Tasha, Giorgio, Sandro and Matteo. He speaks fluent French, English, Arabic and Italian.
