= Gundy (disambiguation) =

Gundy is a locality in the Hunter Region of New South Wales, Australia.

Gundy may also refer to:

- Gundy, Alberta, Canadian locality
- Gundy (surname)
- Gundy v. United States, a United States Supreme Court case

== See also ==
- Gundi (disambiguation)
- Gund (disambiguation)
- Grundy (disambiguation)
