= Gundry =

Gundry is a surname. Notable people with the surname include:

- Inglis Gundry (1905–2000), English composer, novelist, musicologist, music pedagogue and writer
- Nathaniel Gundry (1701?–1754), English lawyer and politician
- Robert H. Gundry (born 1932), American scholar and retired professor of New Testament studies and Koine Greek
- Steven Gundry, American doctor and author

== See also ==
- Gundry Sanitarium, a medical institution established in 1900
- Grundy (disambiguation)
