= Gund (disambiguation) =

Gund is a manufacturer of plush stuffed toys, one of the first manufactures of Teddy bears.

Gund may also refer to:

== People ==
- Agnes Gund (1938–2025), American philanthropist and arts patron
- George Gund II (1888–1966), American banker, business executive, and real estate investor
- George Gund III (1937–2013), American businessman and sports entrepreneur
- Gordon Gund, CEO of Gund Investment Corporation and the owner of various U.S. sports teams
- Graham Gund, president and founder of Gund Partnership, an architecture firm based in Cambridge, Massachusetts
- Gunde Svan (born 1962), Swedish cross country skier and auto racing driver

== Other ==
- Gund Institute for Ecological Economics, an environmental institute housed at the University of Vermont
- Gund, the historical name of the Indian village of Kanihama

== See also ==
- Gundi (disambiguation)
- Gundy (disambiguation)
