= Gruni =

Gruni (Hungarian: Grúny) may refer to several villages in Romania:

- Gruni, a village in Cornereva Commune, Caraş-Severin County
- Gruni, a village in Belinţ Commune, Timiș County

== See also ==
- Gruny (disambiguation)
