= Georgi Asparuhov =

Bulgarian footballer (1943–1971)

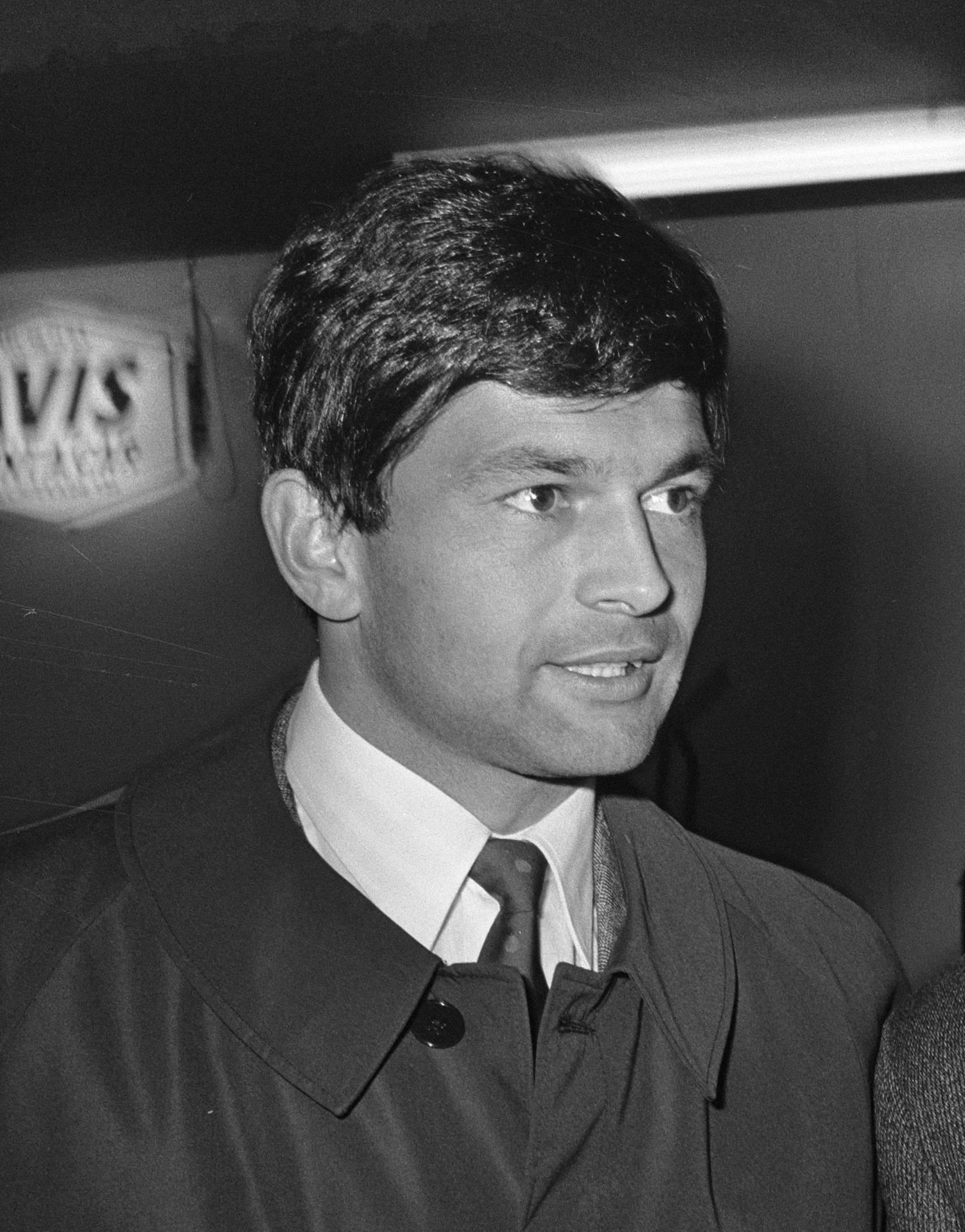
- Georgi Asparuhov in 1969

Personal information
- Full name: Georgi Asparuhov Rangelov
- Date of birth: 4 May 1943
- Place of birth: Sofia, Kingdom of Bulgaria
- Date of death: 30 June 1971 (aged 28)
- Place of death: Vitinya Pass, PR Bulgaria
- Height: 1.86 m (6 ft 1 in)
- Position: Striker

Youth career
- 1953–1959: Levski Sofia

Senior career*
Years	Team	Apps	(Gls)
1960–1961	Levski Sofia	23	(7)
1961–1963	Botev Plovdiv	62	(35)
1963–1971	Levski Sofia	176	(118)
Total		261	(160)

International career
1962–1970	Bulgaria	49	(18)
- * Club domestic league appearances and goals

Georgi Asparuhov Rangelov (Bulgarian: Георги Аспарухов Рангелов; 4 May 1943 – 30 June 1971), nicknamed Gundi, was a Bulgarian footballer who played as a striker.

A prolific forward of his generation, Asparuhov was renowned for his finishing, technique and heading ability. He was voted the best Bulgarian footballer of the 20th century and Europe's 40th best player of the century, a position shared with Paolo Rossi. Asparuhov was also nominated for the 1965 Ballon d'Or award, finishing eighth in the final standings.

In international football, Asparuhov made his Bulgaria debut on 6 May 1962 at the age of 19. He made 49 appearances in total, appearing at three FIFA World Cup tournaments, in 1962, 1966 and 1970, and scoring 18 goals.

Asparuhov's career was cut short in 1971 at the age of 28 when he died in a vehicle accident.

== Career ==
=== Beginnings at Levski ===
Asparuhov began his senior career at Levski Sofia in the end of 1959–60 season at the age of 17. He made his debut on 5 June 1960 in a 1–0 home loss against Lokomotiv Sofia, coming on as a second-half substitute. His first senior goal came during the following campaign when he scored in a 1–1 away draw against Botev Plovdiv on 28 September 1960.

=== Botev Plovdiv ===
From 1961 to 1963, Asparuhov played for Botev Plovdiv, where he completed his military service. With the club, he won his first senior trophy, the Bulgarian Cup in 1962, and finished as runner-up in the Bulgarian championship in 1963.

Asparuhov made his European debut with Botev on 13 September 1962, scoring twice away against Steaua București in the first leg of their preliminary-round tie in the 1962–63 Cup Winners' Cup, although Botev lost 3–2. A week later, in the return leg in Plovdiv, he scored his first-ever hat-trick in a resounding 5–1 victory. He also scored in Botev's 4–0 away win over Shamrock Rovers on 24 October 1962.

Botev went on to reach the quarter-finals of the competition, becoming the first Bulgarian club to advance that far in a European club competition. Asparuhov finished the tournament as its top scorer with six goals. His performances for the Plovdiv side helped earn him a place in the Bulgaria national team, and as a Botev player he represented Bulgaria at the 1962 FIFA World Cup in Chile.

At Botev, Asparuhov played in an attacking trio with Dinko Dermendzhiev and Georgi Popov. The trio was known as “Chiko–Tumbi–Gundi–Gol”.

In October 1963, Asparuhov returned to Levski Sofia.

=== Return to Levski ===
Widely regarded as Levski's greatest ever player, Asparuhov played over 230 games for the club, winning three Bulgarian League titles and three Bulgarian Cups. During his time at the club he won the Bulgarian footballer of the year and Bulgarian sportsperson of the year in 1965.

Asparuhov is Levski's third all-time leading goal scorer (153). In 1964–65 season he became the league's top scorer with 27 goals in 29 matches.

Some of the top European clubs at the time sought his services. In the 1965–66 European Cup, Levski played Benfica, with Eusébio in the squad of the Portuguese. When Benfica eliminated Levski in a tight tie, and Gundi having netted 3 of Levski's 4 goals across both legs, Europe began to view him with interest. In fact, he was the first foreign player to have scored two goals at Benfica's stadium. Asparuhov was wanted by Benfica themselves.

In the history of Bulgarian football, it is often claimed that in 1967 Georgi Asparuhov was invited to join AC Milan, despite the fact that at the time the transfer of leading Bulgarian players to Western clubs was highly restricted and subject to state control. The alleged interest is associated with the renowned “rossoneri” coach Nereo Rocco. Asparuhov is also frequently credited with the following emblematic response, which has become part of football folklore:

"Tell them there is a country named Bulgaria. In that country there is a team called Levski, they might not have heard of it. But I was born in this team and I will die there."

Despite the widespread circulation of this story, it should be approached with a degree of caution given the specific historical context. Following Italy’s disappointing performances at the 1962 and 1966 FIFA World Cups, the Italian Football Federation introduced restrictions on the recruitment of foreign players by Serie A clubs, which remained in place until 1980. The rule did not apply to foreign players who already had professional contracts with Italian clubs, nor to the so-called oriundi—players of Italian descent born abroad who could obtain Italian citizenship. This means that by 1967 there was no clear regulatory pathway that would have allowed the registration of a Bulgarian player in the Italian league, even if there had been genuine interest from a coach or club management.

== International career ==
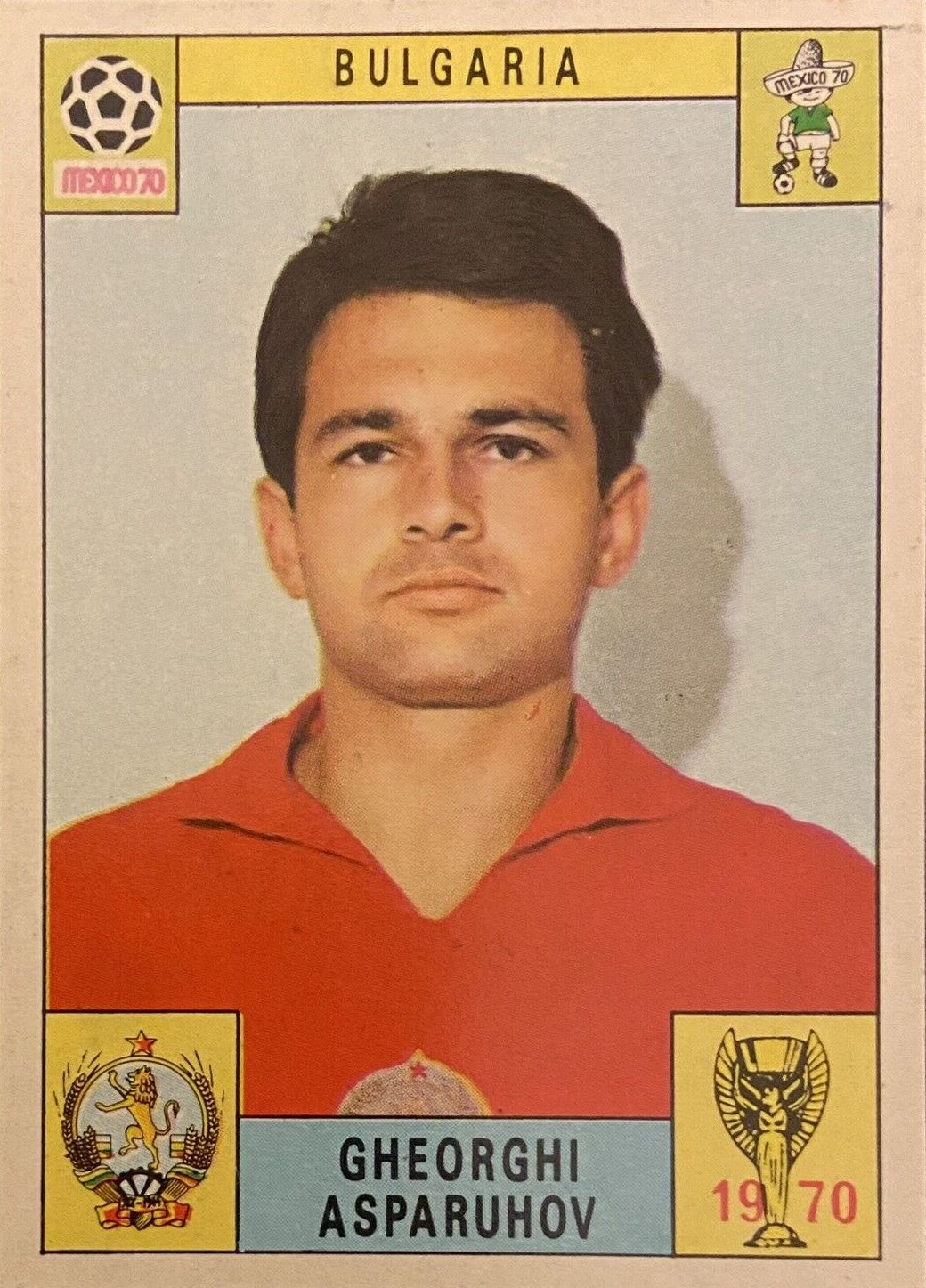
Georgi Asparuhov's sticker for the Panini México 70 sticker collection

Asparuhov made his debut for the Bulgarian national team in a friendly match against Austria at Praterstadion in Vienna on 6 May 1962 and was named in the 22-man Bulgarian squad for the 1962 FIFA World Cup. He made his World Cup debut in the second group game against Hungary at Estadio Braden Copper Co. in Rancagua on 3 June 1962.

Asparuhov scored his first goals for Bulgaria on 7 November 1962, scoring twice in a 3–1 home victory over Portugal in a 1964 European Nations' Cup qualifying match. Then he top scored for Bulgaria in their 1966 World Cup qualifying campaign with five goals. During the World Cup he scored Bulgaria's only goal in a 1–3 loss against Hungary at Old Trafford in Manchester.

Asparuhov was part of Bulgaria's squad at the 1970 World Cup. He played in 3 matches, however he did not score a goal. According to his wife, Velichka Markova, he was injured and wasn't even supposed to be in Mexico. The Party and State leadership insisted that Asparuhov had to be part of the team as a morale booster for his teammates and promised that he would not take part in the matches – a promise they did not keep.

== Death ==
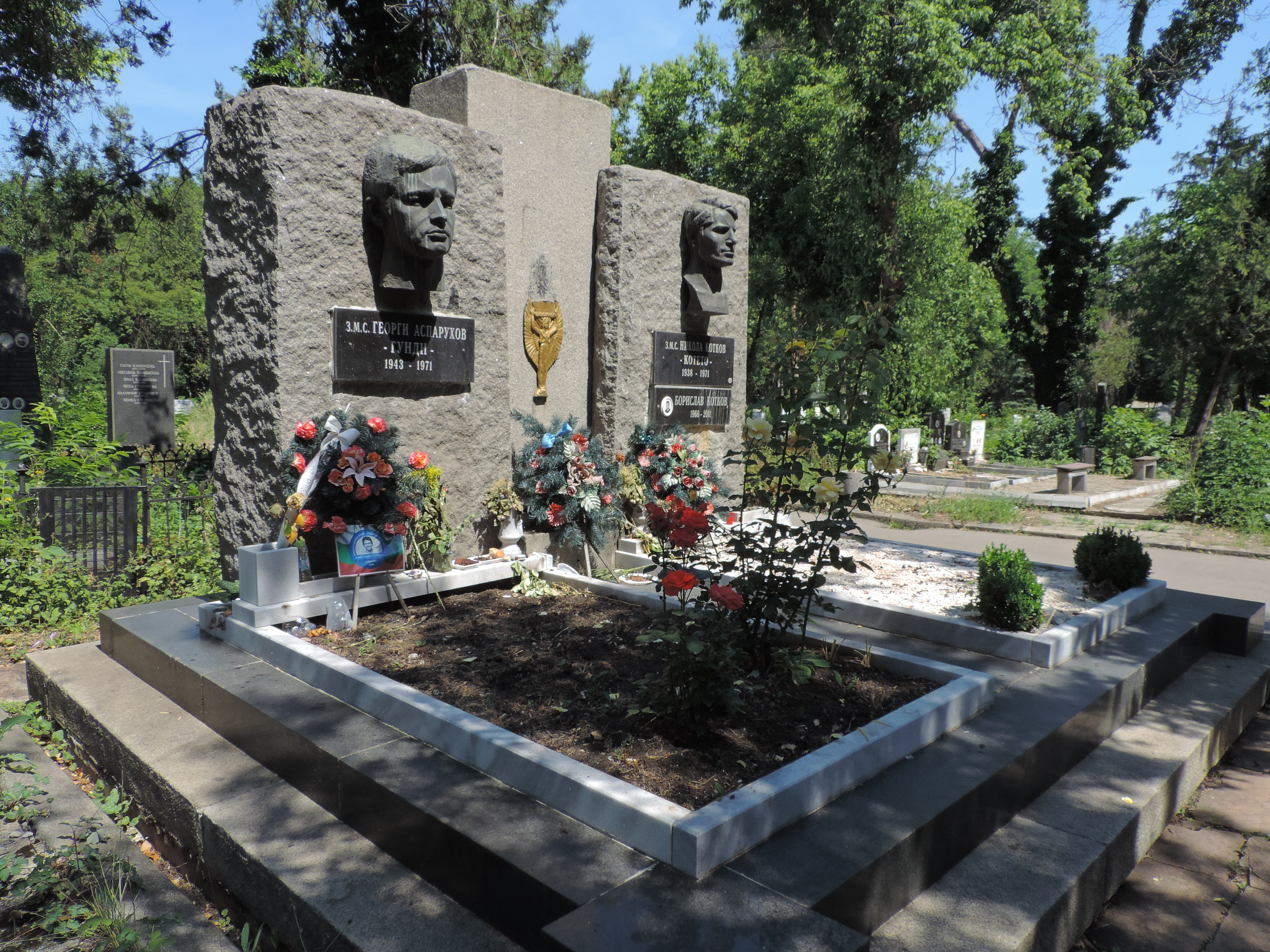
The graves of Georgi Asparuhov and Nikola Kotkov at the Central Sofia Cemetery

On 30 June 1971, along with Nikola Kotkov, Asparuhov had to travel for a friendly game in Vratsa. During the trip with Asparuhov's Alfa Romeo Giulia GT, they were speeding along Vitinha's tight mountain roads when, out of nowhere. a truck appeared after a turn. It was impossible to stop in time and the car smashed into the fuel tank of the truck, resulting in a deadly fire that killed the footballers almost instantly. Over 550,000 people gathered at his funeral in Sofia, being the largest attended funeral in the country's history.

== Legacy ==
The stadium of Levski Sofia is named Georgi Asparuhov Stadium in honour of the famous striker.

A street in the "Hristo Smirnenski" District in Sofia is also named after Georgi Asparuhov – Gundi.

In 1999, Georgi Asparuhov was posthumously named the Best Bulgarian Footballer of the 20th Century.

On 21 May 2014, by decree of Rosen Plevneliev, President of Bulgaria, Georgi Asparuhov was posthumously awarded the Order of Stara Planina, first degree, for his exceptional merits in the field of sports.

On 1 October 2023, a full-length monument of Asparuhov was unveiled in the Sofia's Geo Milev Park.

On 9 October 2024, the biographical drama "Gundi: Legend of Love" premiered, telling the story of the late Georgi Asparuhov.

== Career statistics ==
=== Club ===
Appearances and goals by club, season and competition
Club	Season	League		Cup		Continental		Total	
Club	Season	Apps	Goals	Apps	Goals	Apps	Goals	Apps	Goals
Levski Sofia	1959–60	2	0	0	0	—		2	0
Levski Sofia	1960–61	14	3	1	0	—		15	3
Levski Sofia	1961–62	7	4	0	0	—		7	4
Levski Sofia	Total	23	7	1	0	0	0	24	7
Botev Plovdiv	1961–62	14	5	2	1	—		16	6
Botev Plovdiv	1962–63	27	16	6	3	6	6	39	25
Botev Plovdiv	1963–64	6	4	0	0	—		6	4
Botev Plovdiv	Total	47	25	8	4	6	6	61	35
Levski Sofia	1963–64	22	15	5	6	—		27	21
Levski Sofia	1964–65	29	27	6	3	—		35	30
Levski Sofia	1965–66	22	13	0	0	4	5	26	18
Levski Sofia	1966–67	11	7	5	3	—		16	10
Levski Sofia	1967–68	25	14	2	1	2	2	29	17
Levski Sofia	1968–69	27	22	3	1	—		30	23
Levski Sofia	1969–70	24	12	3	2	4	3	31	17
Levski Sofia	1970–71	16	8	2	0	2	2	20	10
Levski Sofia	Total	176	118	26	16	12	12	214	146
Career statistics		246	150	35	20	18	18	299	188

=== National team ===
Bulgaria
Year	Apps	Goals
1962	6	2
1963	6	2
1964	2	0
1965	8	5
1966	6	2
1967	3	1
1968	4	2
1969	7	3
1970	7	1
Total	49	18

=== International goals ===
Scores and results list Bulgaria's goal tally first.

Georgi Asparuhov: International Goals
#	Date	Venue	Opponent	Score	Result	Competition
1.	7 November 1962	Vasil Levski National Stadium, Sofia	Portugal	1–1	3–1	1964 European Nations' Cup Qualification
2.	7 November 1962	Vasil Levski National Stadium, Sofia	Portugal	2–1	3–1	1964 European Nations' Cup Qualification
3.	6 January 1963	20 August 1955 Stadium, Belouizdad	Algeria	1–0	1–2	Friendly
4.	23 January 1963	Stadio Olimpico, Rome	Portugal	1–0	1–0	1964 European Nations' Cup Qualification
5.	13 June 1965	Vasil Levski National Stadium, Sofia	Israel	3–0	4–0	1966 World Cup Qualification
6.	26 September 1965	Vasil Levski National Stadium, Sofia	Belgium	2–0	3–0	1966 World Cup Qualification
7.	21 November 1965	Ramat Gan Stadium, Ramat Gan	Israel	2–1	2–1	1966 World Cup Qualification
8.	29 December 1965	Stadio Comunale, Florence	Belgium	1–0	2–1	1966 World Cup Qualification
9.	29 December 1965	Stadio Comunale, Florence	Belgium	2–0	2–1	1966 World Cup Qualification
10.	14 June 1966	Stadio Comunale, Bologna	Italy	1–2	1–6	Friendly
11.	20 July 1966	Old Trafford, Manchester	Hungary	1–0	1–3	1966 World Cup
12.	12 November 1967	Vasil Levski National Stadium, Sofia	Sweden	3–0	3–0	Euro 1968 Qualification
13.	27 October 1968	Vasil Levski National Stadium, Sofia	Netherlands	2–0	2–0	1970 World Cup Qualification
14.	11 December 1968	Wembley, London	England	1–0	1–1	Friendly
15.	23 April 1969	Vasil Levski National Stadium, Sofia	Luxembourg	1–0	2–1	1970 World Cup Qualification
16.	23 April 1969	Vasil Levski National Stadium, Sofia	Luxembourg	2–0	2–1	1970 World Cup Qualification
17.	15 June 1969	Vasil Levski National Stadium, Sofia	Poland	4–1	4–1	1970 World Cup Qualification
18.	24 February 1970	Estadio Nacional del Perú, Lima	Peru	2–3	3–5	Friendly

== Honours ==
=== Club ===
Botev Plovdiv

- Bulgarian Cup: 1961–62

Levski Sofia

- Bulgarian League (3): 1964–65, 1967–68, 1969–70
- Bulgarian Cup (3): 1966–67, 1969–70, 1970–71

=== Individual ===
- Bulgarian League top scorer: 1964–65 (27 goals)
- UEFA Cup Winners' Cup top scorer: 1962–63 (6 goals)
- Bulgarian sportsperson of the year: 1965
- Bulgarian footballer of the year: 1965
- Best Bulgarian footballer of the 20th century
- 1965 Ballon d'Or: 8th place
- 1966 Ballon d'Or: 14th place
- 1968 Ballon d'Or: 14th place
- FUWO European Team of the Season: 1968
- Stara planina order: 2014
- Holder of an Order of Labour
- Deserved Master of Sports
- Holder of the Fairplay prize /posthumously/: 1999
- IFFHS Top 100 Best European Players of the 20th Century: 40th place

=== International ===
Bulgaria

- UEFA Euro 1968: 5th place
