= Gruny =

Gruny may refer to:

- Gruny, Somme, Hauts-de-France, France
- Grúny, also spelled Gruni, Belinț, Romania
- Grúny, also spelled Gruni, Cornereva, Romania

== People with the surname ==
- Berta Gruny, mother of Wilhelm Dürr the Younger
- Jim Gruny, commander of Marine Recruit Training Regiment San Diego
- Nadia Gruny (born 1984), American cricket player
- Pascale Gruny (born 1960), French politician

== See also ==
- Grundy (disambiguation)
- Gruni (disambiguation)
