= Juliana Cerqueira Leite =

Brazilian sculptor based in New York (born 1981)

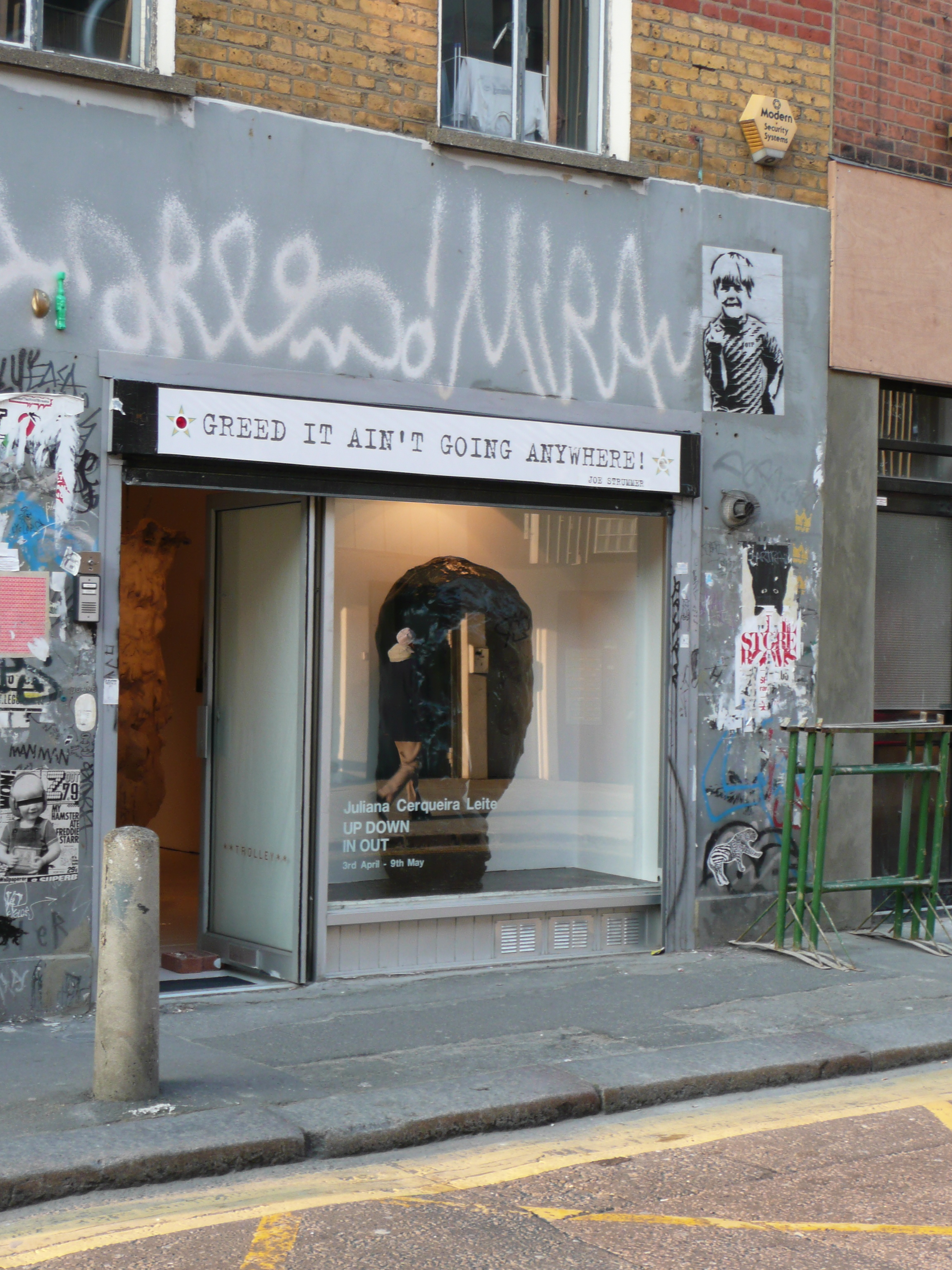
- The London gallery of Brazilian-American artist Juliana Cerqueira Leite, titled with a quotation from punk rock warlord Joe Strummer. (Photograph by Yves Cosentino)
- Born: 1981 (age 44–45)
- Education: Chelsea College of Arts, Slade School of Fine Art (UCL)
- Website: https://www.julianacerqueiraleite.com/

Juliana Cerqueira Leite (born 1981) is a Brazilian sculptor based in New York, known for creating large-scale works that explores the physical presence of the human body. She is considered to push the boundaries of sculpture.

== Life and education ==
Leite (pronounced: ˈleɪt͡ʃˌɘ) was born and grew up in Brazil and studied sculpture in the United Kingdom at Chelsea College of Arts, graduating with an MFA in sculpture from the Slade School of Fine Art in London. She then undertook an MA in Drawing at Camberwell College of Art.

== Artwork ==
Leite's artwork often combines performance and sculpture. The sculptural materials she uses are wide-ranging and include: hydrocal, FGR-95, plaster, glass fibre, steel, and pigment. To create her artworks, Leite often makes casts from clay, using her own body and movement to develop forms. Leite has also produced site specific and video installation works.

Leite has been inspired by ancient cultures and events, including excavations at Pompeii. Earlier work explored Amazonian funerary urns.

Until Different, Leite's first solo exhibition in New York, was held at Arsenal Contemporary, Bowery in 2018.

== Exhibitions ==
Notable exhibitions include:

- Vancouver Biennale, Vancouver, Canada (2014 Residency)
- Antarctica, Antarctic Pavilion, 57th Venice Biennale of Art, Venice, Italy, 2017
- Until Different, London, UK (2018)
- Sculpture in the City - London, UK (2018)
- Orogenesis - Naples, Italy (2019)

== Awards ==
- The Kenneth Armitage Young Sculptor Prize, 2006
- A.I.R. Gallery Fellowship, 2010-2011
- Sculpture Space residency, 2011/2012
- Furla Art Prize, 5th Moscow International Young Art Biennial, 2016
- Pollock Krasner Foundation Grant, April 2019

== See also ==
- Do It Again (EP)
- Arts in Marrakech (AiM) International Biennale
