= Gundi: Legend of Love =

- Theatrical release poster
- Directed by: Dimitar Dimitrov
- Written by: Emil Bonev
- Produced by: Ivan Hristov; Andrey Arnaudov
- Starring: Pavel Ivanov; Aleksandra Svilenova
- Cinematography: Boris Slavkov
- Edited by: Viktoria Radoslavova
- Music by: Georgi Strezov
- Distributed by: No Blink
- Release date: 9 October 2024
- Running time: 159 minutes
- Country: Bulgaria
- Language: Bulgarian
- Budget: 4.5 million leva (2.3 million euro)
- Box office: $5.7 million

Gundi: Legend of Love (Bulgarian: Гунди – Легенда за любовта, Gundi – legenda za lyubovta) is a 2024 Bulgarian biographical sports drama film directed by Dimitar Dimitrov. Set in socialist Bulgaria in the 1960s and early 70s, the film is based on the life and career of bulgarian football star Georgi Asparuhov (1943–1971).

== Cast ==
- Pavel Ivanov as Georgi Asparuhov (Gundi)
- Aleksandra Svilenova as Gundi's wife Lita
- Paraskeva Dzhukelova as Gundi's mother Maria
- Stoyan Radev as Zoro
- Aleksandra Kostova as Gundi's sister Lidka
- Emil Markov as Lita's father architect Markov
- Bilyana Petrinska as Lita's mother Marena
- Nikolay Urumov as Kotse Georgiev
- Sotir Melev as Aleksandar Kostov
- Anton Dimitrachkov as Georgi Popov - Tumbi

== Production ==
Shooting took place in June and July 2023.

== Release ==
Gundi: Legend of Love premiered on 9 October 2024 in Arena Sofia and its opening weekend set an all-time Bulgarian box office record. In November 2024, it became the highest-grossing film in Bulgarian history and the first film to sell more than 500,000 tickets in Bulgaria since 1989.
