= Honoured Master of Sport =

Honoured Master of Sport (Russian: Заслуженный мастер спорта, abbreviated ZMS) is an honorary sports title awarded to athletes for outstanding achievements in sports. The standard abbreviation in Russian sports reference literature is ZMS.

The title was first established in the Soviet Union in 1934 (with the official name "Honoured Master of Sport of the USSR" from 1983). Similar honorary titles existed in other socialist countries such as Bulgaria, Mongolia, Poland, the GDR, Romania, and Czechoslovakia; some of them still exist today.

After the collapse of the USSR, the title "Honoured Master of Sport of the USSR" was awarded in 1992 for achievements as part of the Unified Team. Starting in 1992, new versions of the "Honoured Master of Sport" title were established in several former Soviet republics—some as honorary titles, others as formal sports classifications:

- Russia – established in 1992 as an honorary sports title.
- Ukraine – established in 1992 as an honorary sports title; as of the 2006 Unified Sports Classification of Ukraine, it is a formal sports title.
- Belarus – established in 1994 as an honorary sports title; since 13 April 1995, recognized officially as an honorary title.
- Kazakhstan – a sports classification title.
- Kyrgyzstan – honorary sports title.
- Moldova – honorary sports title.
- Tajikistan – honorary sports title.
- Uzbekistan – honorary titles such as "Uzbekistan Iftikhori" (28 August 1998) and "Honoured Athlete of the Republic of Uzbekistan" (26 April 1996).

Honorary title refers to an individual title awarded by a country's highest legislative body or president. Honorary sports title refers to an individual title awarded by the relevant ministry or agency responsible for sports. Sports classification title is awarded based on meeting standards established by national sports classification systems.

== Russia ==
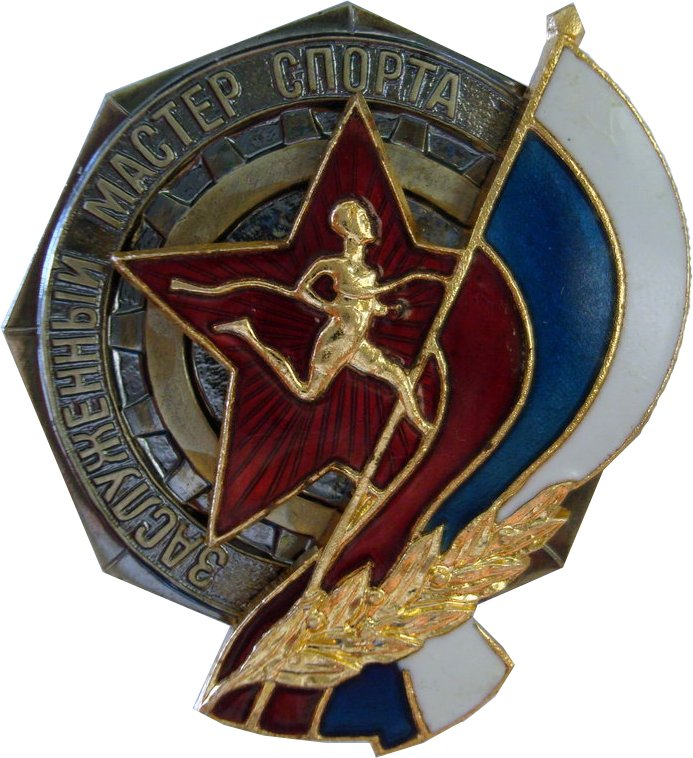
Badge awarded before 2007

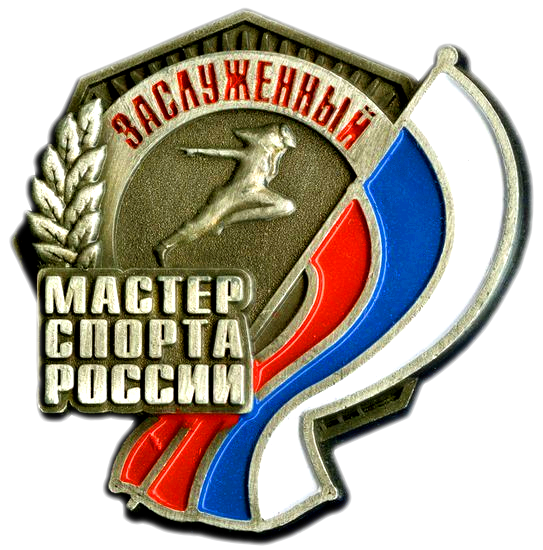
Badge awarded since 2007

The title of "Honoured Master of Sport of Russia" (Russian: Заслуженный мастер спорта России) is an honorary sports title established in 1992.

The latest version of the regulations governing this title was adopted in 2008, with minor amendments to the 2006 order. Decisions on awarding or revoking the title are made by the highest governing body for physical culture and sports in the Russian Federation.

According to current regulations, the title may be awarded to:

Champions and medalists of the Olympic Games, Paralympic Games, and Deaflympics;

World champions in events included in the programs of the Olympic, Paralympic, and Deaflympic Games – in individual events, including relays, groups, pairs, etc., as well as in team sports;

World and European champions, and winners of World and European Cups, who have also accumulated the required number of points in accordance with a special scoring table;

"By way of exception" — "for outstanding contributions to enhancing the prestige of the Russian Federation and Russian sport at the international level, demonstrated through exceptional courage and skill." Although the title of "Honoured Master of Sport of Russia" is awarded to Russian citizens, an exception was made in 2008: following Zenit's victory in the 2007–08 UEFA Cup, team captain Anatoliy Tymoshchuk was awarded the title, despite not holding Russian citizenship. Tymoshchuk is a citizen of Ukraine and had already been awarded the title of "Honoured Master of Sport of Ukraine" in 2005. Other foreign players from Zenit did not receive the Russian title.

== Ukraine ==
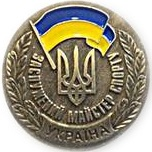
Badge of Honoured Master of Sport of Ukraine

The title of Honoured Master of Sport of Ukraine (abbreviated as HMSU; Ukrainian: Заслужений майстер спорту України) is an honorary sports title established in 1992. With the introduction of the Unified Sports Classification of Ukraine in 2006, it was redefined as a sports title

The procedure and criteria for awarding or revoking the title are regulated by the Unified Sports Classification of Ukraine (2006). Between 1993 and 2006, the title was governed by the Regulation on the Honorary Title "Honoured Master of Sport of Ukraine" (1993 and 1997 versions). The title is conferred and revoked by the highest government authority overseeing physical culture and sports in Ukraine. It is awarded to Ukrainian citizens only.

According to the 2006 Classification, the HMSU title is awarded "to athletes in individual or team sports as a mark of their personal achievements" upon meeting the prescribed standards. These include:

In Olympic sports:

- Olympic champion, world champion, or Olympic/world medalist;
- Two-time European champion, or one-time European champion (if the championships are held every 2 or 4 years), or three-time
- European medalist; :: In non-Olympic sports (including non-Olympic disciplines of Olympic sports):
- World Games champion or medalist;
- Two-time world champion or three-time world medalist;
- Winner or two-time medalist of the Chess Olympiad; :: In para-sports:
- Two-time gold medalist or three-time medalist of the Paralympic Games, Deaflympics, World or European Championships, or the Chess Olympiad.

Although the Unified Sports Classification of Ukraine (2006) does not formally provide for awarding the HMSU title based on other accomplishments (previously, the title could be granted "based on a combination of results"), some sports have applied additional criteria. For example, in 2009, seventeen footballers of Shakhtar Donetsk were awarded the title for winning the 2008–09 UEFA Cup, including ten players who did not hold Ukrainian citizenship.

According to the 2006 classification, the title of Honoured Master of Sport of Ukraine may be revoked only in cases of a lifetime disqualification for anti-doping rule violations. (Previously, the grounds for revocation were broader.)

== Belarus ==
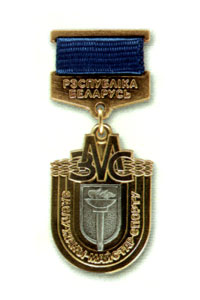
Breast badge of "Honoured Master of Sport of the Republic of Belarus" (2005 version)

The title of "Honoured Master of Sport of the Republic of Belarus" (Belarusian: Заслужаны майстар спорту Рэспублікi Беларусь) is an honorary title conferred by decree of the President of the Republic of Belarus.

The title was established in 1994 as an honorary sports distinction. Under the Law of the Republic of Belarus dated 13 April 1995 "On State Awards of the Republic of Belarus", it was formally recognized as an honorary title. The subsequent law, enacted on 18 May 2004, states:

The honorary title "Honored Master of Sports of the Republic of Belarus" is awarded to athletes, including athletes with disabilities, for achieving high results at the Olympic Games, Paralympic Games, and World Games, championships, world and European championships, and World and European Cups.

— Law of the Republic of Belarus (lawbelarus.com)

On 12 April 1996, individuals who had been awarded the title "Honoured Master of Sport of the USSR" were granted equal status with those awarded the title "Honoured Master of Sport of the Republic of Belarus." (In 1994–1995, several Honoured Masters of Sport of the USSR were also formally awarded the Belarusian title.)

The official description of the badge was approved on 15 January 1996, and a new version was adopted on 8 April 2005, in which the inscriptions were changed from Russian to Belarusian.

There are no clearly defined criteria for the award of the title. Olympic champions and medalists are generally granted the title. In 2002, all members of the national hockey team that placed fourth at the Winter Olympics were also awarded the title. At the Paralympic Games, the title is usually awarded to champions.

== Kazakhstan ==
The title of "Honoured Master of Sport of the Republic of Kazakhstan" (Kazakh: Қазақстан Республикасының еңбек сіңірген спорт шебері) is a sports title, conferred by decrees of the Ministry of Youth Affairs, Tourism, and Sports of the Republic of Kazakhstan (later by other governmental bodies).

== Uzbekistan ==
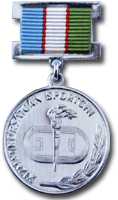
Badge of the title "Honoured Athlete of the Republic of Uzbekistan"

Honorary titles of Uzbekistan awarded to athletes by presidential decrees include:

"Uzbekiston iftikhori" (Uzbek: O’zbekiston iftixori – "Pride of Uzbekistan") — established by the Law of the Republic of Uzbekistan on 28 August 1998.

The honorary title "Uzbekiston iftikhori" is awarded to citizens of the Republic of Uzbekistan who have achieved champion status at World Championships, the Olympic Games, or equivalent international sporting events, and who have contributed to enhancing the prestige, honor, and glory of the homeland. (This title is not limited to athletes.)

"Honoured Athlete of the Republic of Uzbekistan" (Uzbek: O’zbekiston Respublikasida xizmat ko’rsatgan sportchi) — established by the Law of the Republic of Uzbekistan on 26 April 1996.

The honorary title "Honoured Athlete of the Republic of Uzbekistan" is awarded to world champions and record holders, Olympic and Asian Games medalists, and other athletes who have achieved outstanding results in sports competitions.

== Bulgaria ==
The title of "Honoured Master of Sport" (Bulgarian: Заслужил майстор на спорта) has existed in Bulgaria since the socialist era. Unlike the system in the USSR and former Soviet republics, the title is awarded by national sport federations based on their own criteria. The awarding order must be approved by the Minister of Youth and Sports.

== Mongolia ==
The title of "Honoured Master of Sport" (Mongolian: Спортын гавьяат мастер) was awarded in Mongolia from 1960 to 1991. In 1992, it was replaced by the title of "Honoured Athlete of Mongolia" (Mongolian: Гавьяат тамирчин).

== Poland ==
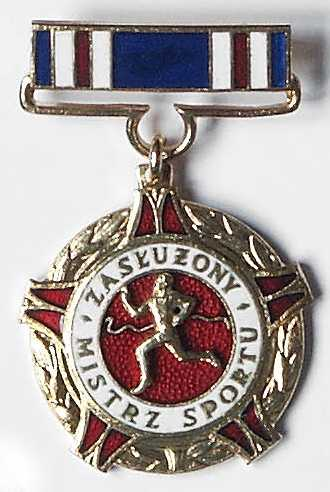
Honoured Master of Sport badge of Poland

The title of "Honoured Master of Sport" (Polish: Zasłużony Mistrz Sportu) was established by the Polish government on 17 April 1950. It has been awarded by the highest national authorities responsible for sport:

Main Committee for Physical Culture (Główny Komitet Kultury Fizycznej) – until 1960

Main Committee for Physical Culture and Tourism (Główny Komitet Kultury Fizycznej i Turystyki) – 1960–1985

Main Committee for Physical Culture and Sport (Główny Komitet Kultury Fizycznej i Sportu) – 1985–1987

Committee for Youth and Physical Culture (Komitet do Spraw Młodzieży i Kultury Fizycznej) – 1987–1989

Office for Physical Culture and Tourism (Urząd Kultury Fizycznej i Turystyki) – in modern Poland. The badge is a gold medal with a diameter of 34 mm, attached to a gold bar measuring 30×8 mm.

== Romania ==
The title of "Honoured Master of Sport" (Maestru emerit al sportului) was introduced in Romania in 1953 by a decision of the Committee for Physical Culture and Sports under the Council of Ministers of the Romanian People's Republic.

== Czechoslovakia ==
The title of "Honoured Master of Sport" (Czech: Zasloužilý mistr sportu) was introduced in Czechoslovakia in 1953 by a decision of the State Committee for Physical Culture and Sports. Among the first to receive the title were Emil Zátopek and Jan Brzák-Felix.
