= Grundy =

Grundy or Grundey may refer to:

== Places ==
=== United States ===
- Grundy, Virginia, a town
- Grundy Center, Iowa, a city
- Grundy County, Missouri
- Grundy County, Illinois
- Grundy County, Iowa
- Grundy County, Tennessee

=== Elsewhere ===
- Grundy Mountain, New South Wales, Australia
- Grundy Lake, Ontario, Canada, in Grundy Lake Provincial Park

== Fictional characters ==
- Miss Grundy, a teacher in the Archie Comics series
- Mrs Grundy, in Thomas Morton's 1798 play Speed the Plough, later used to exemplify a conventional or priggish person
- Grundy, a chicken-like enemy in the video game Stinkoman 20X6
- A family in The Archers, a radio soap opera
- "Solomon Grundy" (nursery rhyme), an English nursery rhyme
- Solomon Grundy (character), a DC Comics supervillain

== Companies ==
- Grundy Art Gallery, Blackpool, Lancashire, England
- Grundy Business Systems Ltd, retailer of the Grundy NewBrain microcomputer
- Grundy's Shoes, a shoe retailer in Adelaide, South Australia
- Reg Grundy Organisation, an Australian television production company, later the Grundy Organisation, then Grundy Television and known informally as Grundy's

== People ==
- Grundy (surname)

== Other uses ==
- USS Grundy (APA-111), a World War II attack transport
- Grundy Senior High School, Grundy, Virginia
- Grundy (horse) (1972–1992), a British Thoroughbred racehorse

== See also ==
- Solomon Grundy (disambiguation)
- Grundy number, the maximum number of colors obtainable by a greedy graph coloring algorithm
- Nimber, a type of value used in combinatorial game theory, also called a Grundy number
- Grundy value, the number associated with a particular game position
- Gruny (disambiguation)
- Gundy (disambiguation)
