= Eva Rothschild =

Irish artist (born 1971)

- Born: 1971 (age 54–55); Dublin, Ireland
- Education: National College of Art and Design (Diploma and foundation studies) 1988-90; University of Ulster (MA) 1990-93; Goldsmiths College (BA) 1997-99
- Occupation: Artist
- Website: www.evarothschild.com

Eva Rothschild RA (born 1971) is an Irish artist based in London.

Eva Rothschild was born in Dublin, Ireland. She received a BA in Fine Art from the University of Ulster, Belfast (1990–93), and an MA in Fine Art from Goldsmiths College, London (1997–99). Her work is predominantly sculptural and she works across a range of materials including aluminium, jesmonite, leather, fabric and perspex. She has a materials based studio practice but also works on major public and outdoor commissions. Her work references the art movements of the 1960s and 1970s, such as Minimalism and is also informed by the contemporary aesthetics of protest and spirituality. In 2014 she was elected Royal Academician.

Rothschild's work has been the subject of institutional solo exhibitions including Australian Centre for Contemporary Art (2018), Dublin City Gallery, the Hugh Lane (2014), Nasher Sculpture Center (2012), The Hepworth Wakefield (2011), South London Gallery (2007), and Kunsthalle Zürich (2004). In 2009 she was awarded the Tate Britain annual Duveens' Commission, for which she produced Cold Corners, a vast rambling geometric sculpture that occupied the length of the neo-classical galleries.

Rothschild's works are held by major public collections including MoMA, New York, Arts Council of England, Irish Museum of Modern Art, Dublin, Tate, and the Walker Art Center, Minneapolis.

In 2019, she represented Ireland at the 58th Venice Biennale.

== Exhibitions ==
=== Solo exhibitions ===
2020

- The Shrinking Universe, Ireland Pavilion, 58th International Art Exhibition, La Biennale di Venezia Touring Show, VISUAL Carlow, Irish Museum of Modern Art, Dublin.

2019

- Furniture, Tapestry and Ceramics, Blue Mountain School, London
- The Shrinking Universe, curated by Mary Cremin, Ireland Pavilion, 58th International Art Exhibition – La Biennale di Venezia, Venice, Italy
- Kosmos, City Gallery Wellington, Wellington, New Zealand

2018

- Kosmos, Australian Centre for Contemporary Art (ACCA), Melbourne, Australia
- "Iceberg Hits", Modern Art, London

2017

- Kaufmann Repetto, Milan, Italy
- A Material Enlightenment, 303 Gallery, New York, NY, USA
- City Room (with Gary Webb), Galeria Mário Sequeira, Parada de Tibães, Portugal

2016

- Alternative to Power, New Art Gallery Walsall, Walsall
- A Gated Community, Sonneveld House, Rotterdam, Netherlands

2015

- Middle Temple, Kaufmann Repetto, Milan, Italy

2014

- Dublin City Gallery, The Hugh Lane, Dublin, Ireland, 2014
- "What the Eye Wants", Modern Art, London
- This and This and This, Art Parcours, Art 45 Basel, Basel, Switzerland

2013

- Narcissus, Galerie Eva Presenhuber, Zürich, Switzerland
- "New Sculpture", New Art Centre, Wiltshire, 2014

2012

- The Douglas Hyde Gallery, Dublin, Ireland, 2012
- Sightings, Nasher Sculpture Centre, Dallas, TX, USA
- Childrens Art Commission: Eva Rothschild: Boys and Sculpture, The Whitechapel Gallery, London
- The Modern Institute, Glasgow, Scotland

2011

- Hot Touch, Kunstverein Hannover, Hanover, Germany
- 303 Gallery, New York, NY, USA, 2011
- Hot Touch, The Hepworth Wakefield, Wakefield Empire Public Art Fund, New York, NY, USA

2009

- Cold Corners, Tate Britain Annual Duveens’ Commission, Tate Britain, London
- Modern Art, London, 2009
- Francesca Kaufmann, Milan, Italy, 2009
- Galerie Eva Presenhuber, Zürich, Switzerland, 2009
- La Conservera: Centro de Arte Contemporaneo, Murcia, Spain, 2009

2008

- The Modern Institute, Glasgow, Scotland
- Tate Britain, London

2007

- South London Gallery, London, 2007
- 303 Gallery, New York, NY, USA, 2007

2006

- Galerie Eva Presenhuber, Zürich, Switzerland

2005

- Modern Art, London, 2005
- Douglas Hyde Gallery, Dublin, Ireland

2004

- Kunsthalle, Zürich, Switzerland Artspace, Sydney, Australia, 2004

2003

- Heavy Cloud, The Modern Institute, Glasgow, Scotland, 2003
- "Sit-In", Galleria Francesca Kaufmann, Milan, Italy, 2003

2002

- Modern Art, London, 2002
- Project Art Centre, Dublin, Ireland, 2002

2001

- Peacegarden, The Showroom, London
- Peacegarden, Cornerhouse, Manchester
- Francesca Kauffman Gallery, Milan, Italy
- Els Hanappe Underground, Athens, Greece

2000

- Camden Arts Centre, London

1999

- The Modern Institute, Glasgow, Scotland

1998

- Titanik Galerie, Turku, Finland

1996

- Great Wall / Black Hole, Iain Irving Projects, Aberdeenshire
- Centre for Contemporary Art, Glasgow

1995

- Bercsenyi Galleria, Budapest, Hungary

== Selected collections ==
- Aïshti Foundation, Antelias, Lebanon
- Arts Council Collection, London
- Berezdivin Collection, Santurce, Puerto Rico British Council, London
- Carnegie Museum of Art, Pittsburgh, PA, USA Cass Sculpture Foundation, Goodwood
- Cloud Art Space, Seoul, South Korea
- Dallas Museum of Art, Dallas, TX, USA
- Dublin City Gallery, The Hugh Lane, Dublin, Ireland
- The Goss-Michael Foundation, Dallas, TX, USA
- The Hepworth Wakefield, Wakefield
- Irish Museum of Modern Art, Dublin, Ireland
- Israel Museum, Jerusalem, Israel
- Leeds City Council, Leeds
- The Museum of Modern Art, New York, NY, USA
- Museum Voorlinden, Waasenaar, Netherlands
- New Art Centre, Salisbury, Wiltshire
- Norwich Castle Museum & Art Gallery, Norwich, Norfolk
- Pier Arts Centre, Stromness, Orkney
- Pilane Heritage Museum, Klövedal, Sweden
- Pizzuti Collection of the Columbus Museum of Art, Columbus, OH, USA Sammlung Goetz, Munich, Germany
- Southampton City Art Gallery, Southampton
- Swiss Re Art Collection, Zürich, Switzerland
- Tate, London
- TBA21 – Thyssen-Bornemisza Art Contemporary, Vienna, Austria Walker Art Center, Minneapolis, MN, USA
- Würth Collection, Schwäbisch Hall, Germany
- Zabludowicz Collection, London
