= Gundi, Bihar =

Gundi गुंडी, गुड़ी
- Village
- Location in Bihar, India Gundi (India)
- Coordinates: 25.650896°N 84.623256°E
- Country: India
- State: Bihar
- District: Bhojpur

Government
  - Type: Panchayati Raj
  - Body: Gram Panchayat
- Elevation: 744 m (2,441 ft)

Languages
  - Official: Bhojpuri, Hindi
- Time zone: UTC+5:30 (IST)
- PIN: 802313
- Telephone code: 91-6182
- Vehicle registration: BR-03

Gundi is a small village of the Bhojpur district of Bihar state, India. It is famous for Yagyawatar Swamy temple, the jhoolan mahotsava conducted annually in the month of shrawan. It is also famous for the Anand Gopal Pandit as mukhiya.

Nowadays, there has been demands from the native population of Gundi make a new legislative assembly constituency in name of "Sant Rameshwar Das" dedicated to godly saint Rameshwar Baba.
