= Solomon Grundy =

Solomon Grundy may refer to:

- "Solomon Grundy" (nursery rhyme), a 19th-century children's nursery rhyme
- Solomon Grundy (character), a villain in some DC comics series, most notably Batman and Green Lantern
- Solomon Grundy (wrestler) (1961–2025), American professional wrestler
- Solomon Grundy (band), a grunge band from Seattle, Washington
- "Solomon Grundy" (song), by English group The Foundations on their 1969 album Digging The Foundations

== See also ==
- Grundy (disambiguation)
- Solomon Gundy, a Jamaican fish pâté
- Solomon Gundie, a ska song based on the nursery rhyme
- Salmagundi, a mixed food dish that may be the etymological source for Solomon Gundy
