= Benedetto Pietromarchi =

Italian sculptor (born 1972)

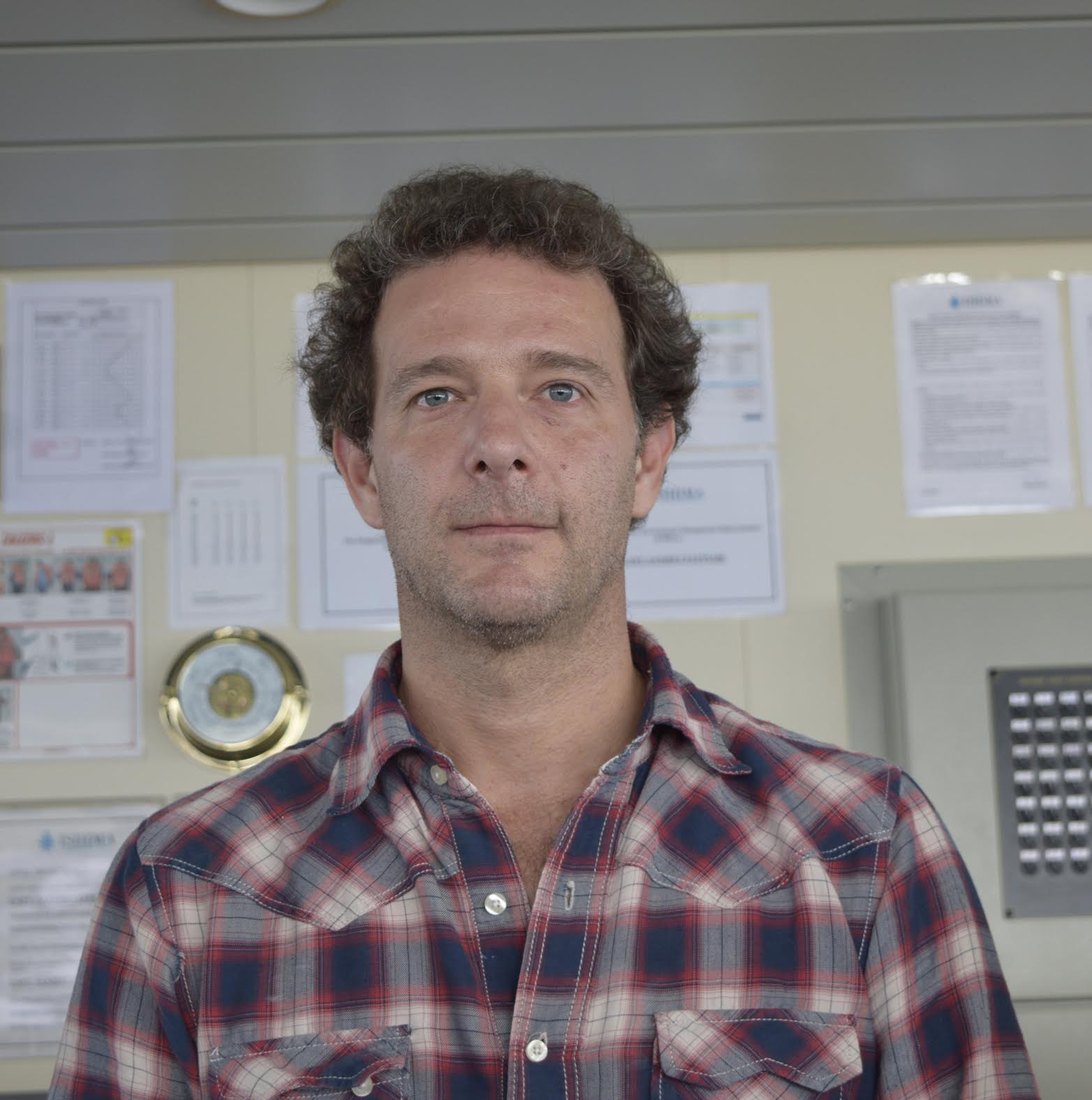
- Born: Benedetto Pietromarchi; 5 March 1972; Rome, Italy
- Known for: Sculpture

Benedetto Pietromarchi (born 5 March 1972 in Rome) is an Italian sculptor.

== Biography ==
Born in a family of diplomats, Pietromarchi travelled around the world with his family, and studied classical sculpture at Accademia delle Belle Arti in Carrara in Italy and at the Architectural Association School of Architecture in London. In his early years, he had the chance to meet and work for Niki de Saint Phalle and Jean Tinguely in the Tarot Garden where he learnt welding. Before the academy he spent time in the studio of Alessandro Tagliolini, where he learnt methods and discipline of studio practice. Benedetto Pietromarchi lived and worked in London for over 15 years, where he started his career as an artist at Shoreditch, home for the London artist hub, where he tied to emerging artists, actors, directors and musicians. In that period museums, colleges and institutions turned to the contemporary reality. These changes prompted him to follow another route, to a more classical Academy. The artist spent five years in Berlin before he moved to Rome where is now based.

He is represented by Josh Lilley Gallery since 2009.

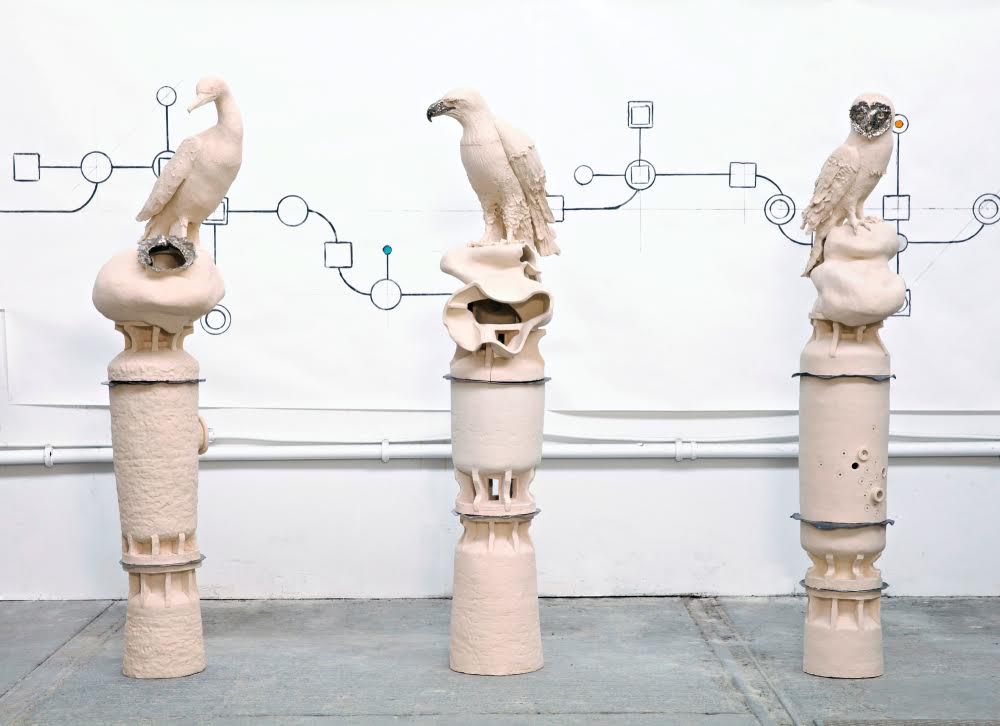
Slosh, 2013

== Works ==
Fundamental to Benedetto Pietromarchi's practice is the investigation into the relationship between nature and artifice, biology and construction, how these notions are experienced and perceived within the context of our varied cultures, histories and present realities. His art works are manual, following the sculpture tradition, using varied materials including terracotta, lead, stainless steel and wood. While the conclusion of Pietromarchi's work takes form through sculpture as physical artistic object, film, collage, drawing, researches, journeys and active experience of discovery, lead up to the final understanding of the artwork. Over time projects are created on various geographical routes, deepening the themes of psychogeography dear to the artist. For Pietromarchi art should exist in and for itself, as a mode through which relay collected information - a vehicle for communication, reflection and revelation. His study of architecture is evident as the manipulation of scale within his work and its relationship to the viewer's body is consistently addressed. At the same time, a very high technical acuity is omnipresent, reflecting his classical training in sculpture. The scale and size of his playfully surreal objects allow them to become monumental while, simultaneously, morphing into redundant, yet formally, powerful structures. Both areas of training provided Pietromarchi with a strong highly informed technical and theoretical foundation, from which he has evolved a unique approach to the central themes of interest within his work.

== Selected exhibitions ==
=== Solo shows ===
- 2016: Of saints and sailors, Josh Lilley Gallery, London
- 2014: Heaven on Mars, Galleria Christopher Paschall, Bogotà Colombia
- 2011: Another Place, Josh Lilley Gallery, London
- 2007: Carrozza, Flora Fairbairn Project, London
- 2006: It's for Real, b-49 Project space, Rome
- 2005: Meteopathic, Trolley Gallery, London
- 2003: Opere Recenti, via della Vetrina Contemporanea, Rome, Italy
- 2000: Suoni Disegni e Sculture, via della Vetrina Contemporanea, Rome, Italy

=== Group shows ===
- 2013: ITaliens, Italian Embassy, Berlin
- 2013: A change of Heart, The University of Leicester’s Sculpture Garden
- 2009: A Broken Fall, Josh Lilley Gallery, London
- 2008: Heart of Glass, Shoreditch Town Hall, London
- 2007: Avatar of Sacred, Flora Fairbairn Project, London
- 2006: Reconstruction 1, Sudeley Castle 2005 New Sculpture, Museum 52, London
- 2003: Tracce di un Seminario, via Farini, Milan
- 2002: Fondazione Antonio Ratti, Advanced course in Visual Art, "Giulio Paolini"
- 1999: Centro Culturale Rialto Occupato, Rome
- 1998: Biennial of Young Artists, Zamalek, Cairo
