= Jun T. Lai =

Taiwanese artist (born 1953)

- Born: 1953 (age 72–73)
- Known for: Painting, sculpture

Chinese name
- Traditional Chinese: 賴純純
- Simplified Chinese: 赖纯纯
Transcriptions
Standard Mandarin
- Hanyu Pinyin: Lài Chúnchún
- Wade–Giles: Lai^{4} Chʻun^{2}-chʻun^{2}
- Tongyong Pinyin: Lài Chúnchún
- IPA: [lâɪ ʈʂʰwə̌n.ʈʂʰwə̌n]

Jun Tsun-Tsun Lai (also Lai Tsun-tsun, Chinese: 賴純純; pinyin: Lài Chúnchún; born 1953) is a Taiwanese artist. Her practice includes sculpture, painting, public art, and other fields.

== Early life ==
Jun Tsun-Tsun Lai was born to an intellectual family in Taipei, where she learned about music, dance, and painting in her childhood. She graduated from the Department of Art, Chinese Culture University in 1974. During her study at Chinese Culture University, inspired by Liao Chi-chun, Lai followed the works of Henri Matisse and his style of Fauvism. She received an MA degree from Tama Art University, Japan. She participated in several artist exchange programs in the US, France, and Switzerland.

== Career ==
Jun T. Lai moved back to Taiwan after the opening of Taipei Fine Arts Museum in 1983. At the same time, Taiwanese artist Lin Show Yu, based in Britain, also returned and held a solo exhibition. The conceptual art and minimal art tendencies exhibited during the show inspired Lai. In 1986, Jun T. Lai, Tsong Pu, and Zhang Yongcun established SOCA Contemporary Art Studio which is located in one of Lai's properties in Taipei. The studio was used for art practice and exhibitions. Before the establishment of official organizations such as Ministry of Culture (Taiwan) and National Culture and Arts Foundation (Taiwan), Lai was attempting to make a vital declaration that every artist should be able to hold their exhibition independently without any form of inspection or approval. Simultaneously, she held art courses, participated lively in international art communities, founded SOCA rookie awards, worked on art related education and promotion projects. By the mid to late 1980s, Lai's works were exhibited in major public museums and major art museums in Taiwan.

== Artistic practice ==
During the 1980s, she focused on highlighting the materials used in her sculptures, to present the piece and convey ideas. She is known for utilizing geometric shapes to create sculptures.

The following are images of her works from Wikimedia Commons:

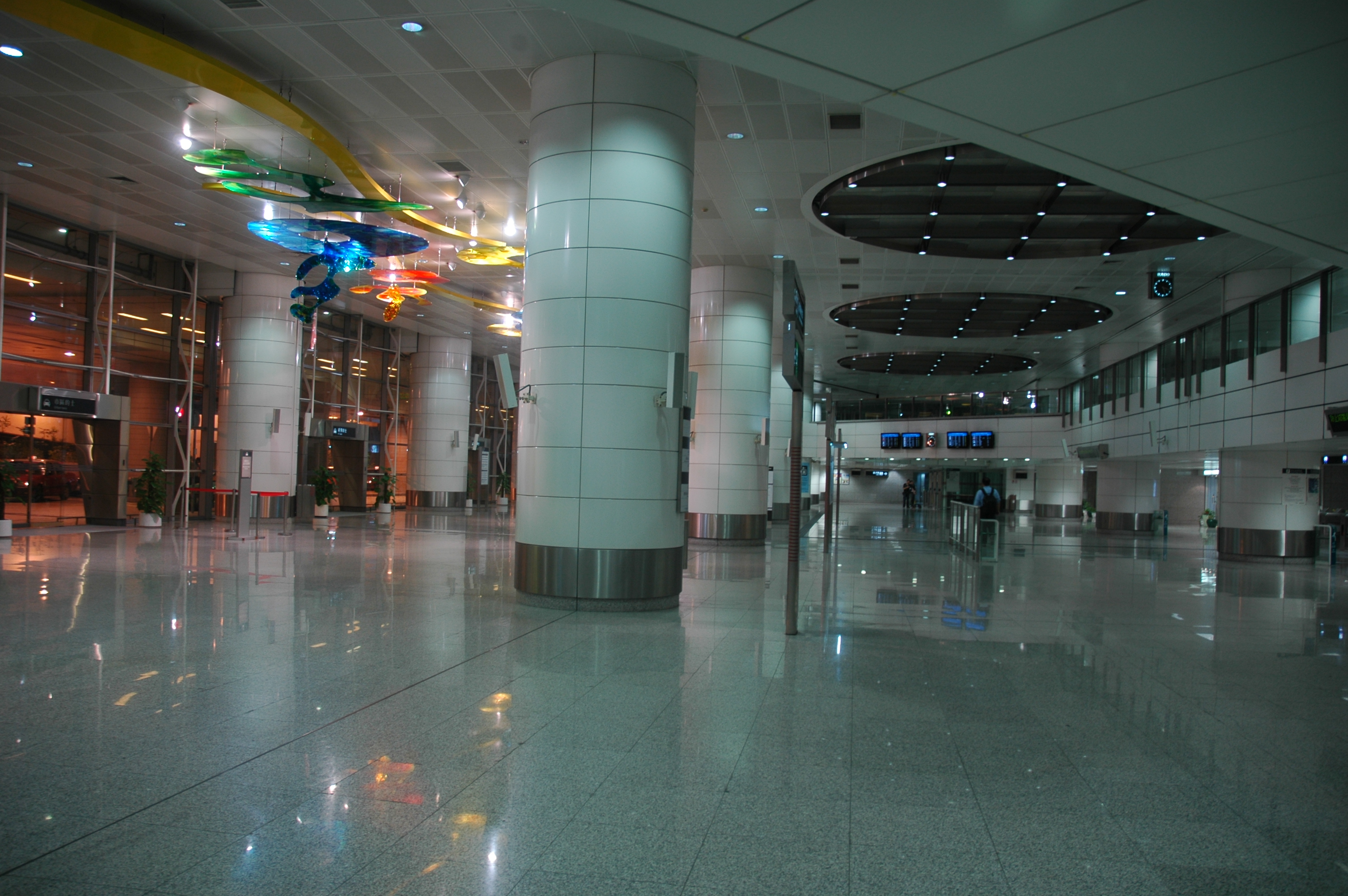
Hong Kong Tsing Yi station《海洋大關園》

Taiwan Chiayi District Court 大門前《真善美的臨界點-法：平等石》
