= Laura Arminda Kingsley =

American-born interdisciplinary artist

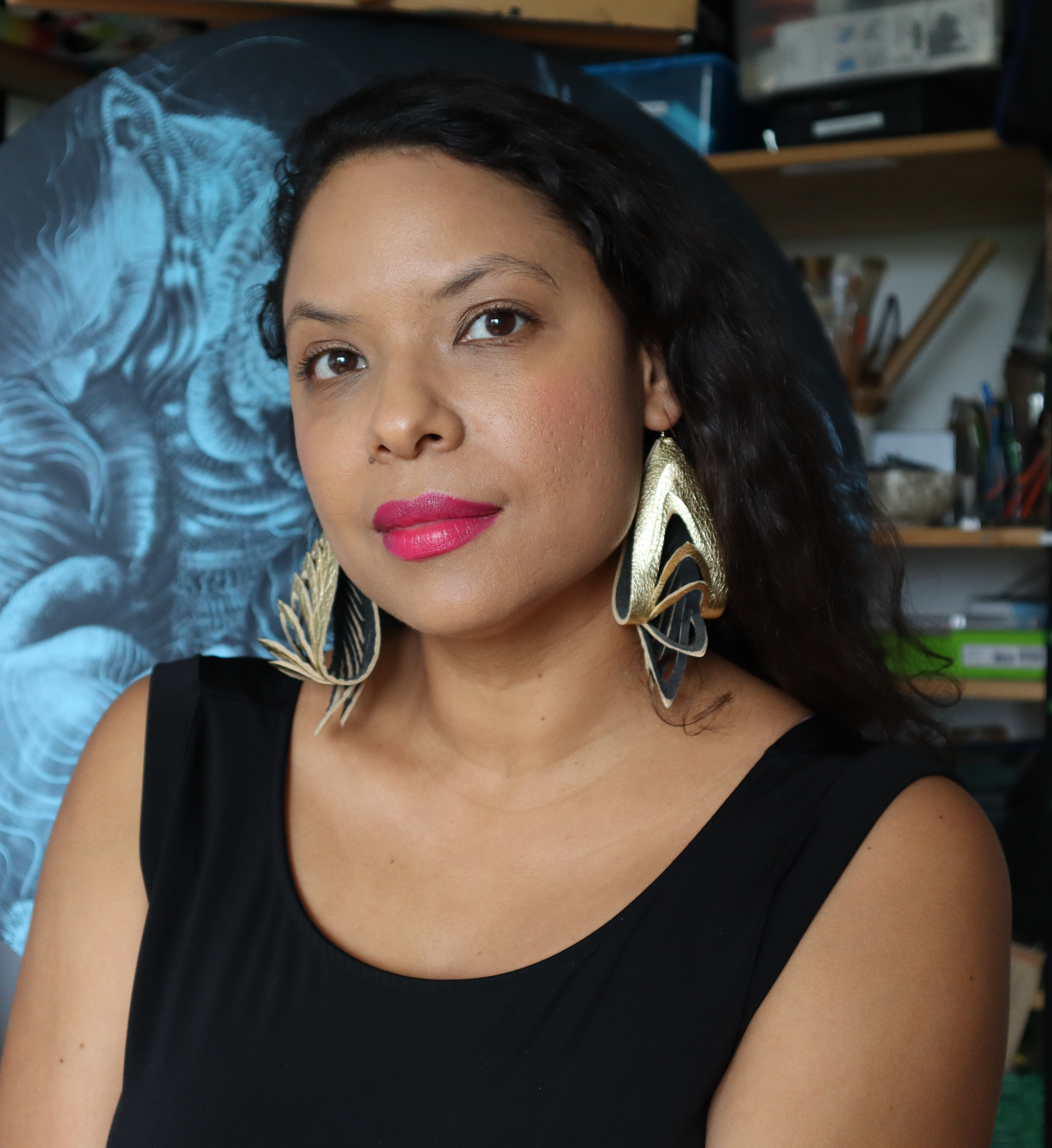
Laura Arminda Kingsley in her studio with her work Murmurs of the Deep III.

Laura Arminda Kingsley (born 1984) is an American-born interdisciplinary artist, working in Switzerland. Her work draws from evolutionary narratives, diasporic mythologies, deep time, and microbiology to engage with plural concepts of human identity. Drawing from multiple cultural backgrounds, Kingsley's practice encourages a shift in perspective towards greater awareness of both human and non-human life.

== Early life and education ==
Kingsley was born in 1984 in Ohio, United States, and grew up in Santo Domingo, Dominican Republic. She received an Associate Degree in Fine Arts from Altos de Chavón in La Romana (2004), a Bachelor of Science from Hunter College, City University of New York (2012), and a Master of Fine Arts from the California College of the Arts (2014). Her graduate studies were supported by the Dorothy and George Saxe Fund Scholarship and the CCA Graduate Merit Scholarship.

== Artistic practice ==
Kingsley works across various media including ceramics, printmaking, installation, performance, animation, and text. Her works often incorporate cartographic lines and explore themes related to materiality, memory, geographical histories, and the interconnected legacies of colonialism, religion, and cultural practices. By using the human body as a motif in her artworks, performances, and installations, she investigates the different ways in which the human form can exist within contemporary reality.

Her installation on the escalators of The Leadenhall Building, Murmurs of the Deep invites viewers to immerse themselves in its freer, wilder world.Other key projects include Tableau Zurich (2023) with her multi-panel painting titled Remember; You Are But Tiny Bits of Existence, and the Twingi Land Art installation in the Swiss Alps (2024). These projects underscore her engagement with large-scale, site-specific art that interacts with public and natural environments.

== Selected exhibitions ==
- Between "Facelessness" and "Facefullness", The Recovery Plan, Florence (2025)
- Recuerda: Eres solo diminutos fragmentos de existencia, Cultural Center of Spain, Santo Domingo (2025)
- Mother Water: Maladamatjaute Was a Woman, PICMOL, Brussels (2024)
- Transient Formations, Coin Coin, Zürich (2024)
- Becoming: Thoughts, Dreams and Landscape, Kamene Cultural Center, Nairobi (2024)
- Murmurs of the Deep, Obere Mühle, Dübendorf (2022)

== Selected performances ==
- Desblanqueamiento, Passengers in Transit, Venice Biennale (2024)
- See Me Through You, Forum Schlossplatz, Aarau (2024)
- Where We Come From, ECK, Aarau (2023)
- Wo Wir Herkommen, Künstlerhaus S11, Solothurn (2023)
- The Procession of Future Artifacts, Asian Art Museum, San Francisco (2013)

== Collections ==
Kingsley's work is held in several public and corporate collections, including:

- Die Mobiliar Art Collection
- Baloise Art Collection
- Zürcher Kantonalbank
- Canton of Zurich Art Collection
- Kunsthaus Grenchen

== Awards and recognition ==
- Art Studio Award of the City of Dübendorf (2021)
- LOCUS Mikro-Grant (2021)
- CCA Graduate Merit Scholarship (2014)
- Dorothy & George Saxe Fund Scholarship (2014)
