= Frances Grundy =

British computer scientist

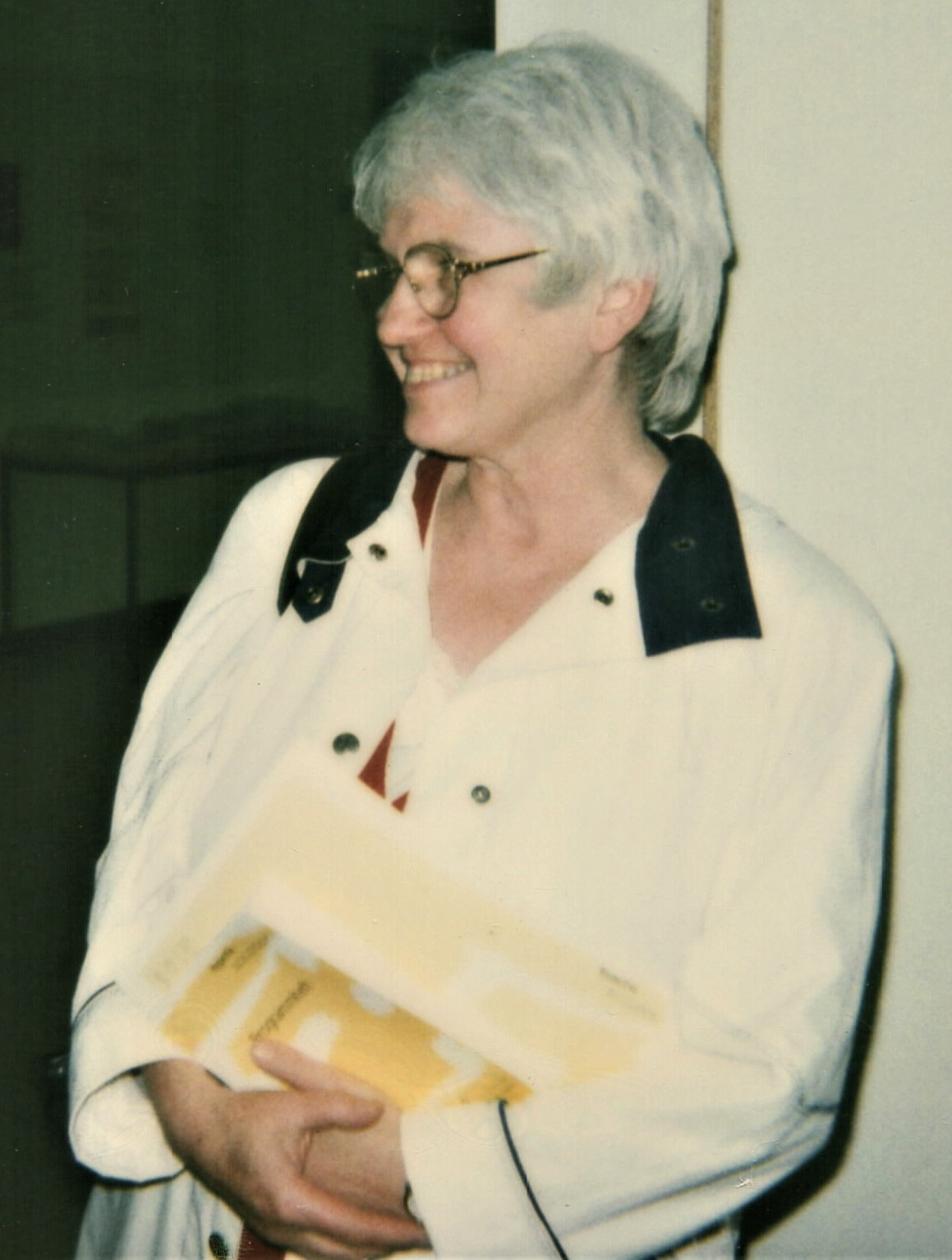
Frances Grundy in 1999

Anna Frances Grundy (born 1942, Dorking) is a British computer scientist and former professor of Computer Studies at Keele University. She is concerned with gender studies in computer science.

== Life and work ==
During the Second World War, her family moved frequently, as her father David Donaldson was a pilot in the Royal Air Force. In 1946, they settled in London, where her father worked as a lawyer. Frances Grundy spent her school years from the age of eight at two boarding schools in Hampshire. She studied mathematics and economics at Keele University. She worked at English Electric Computers for several years and married John Grundy, who taught philosophy at Keele in 1966. A daughter was born in 1968. She completed her doctoral thesis entitled: Interactive computer graphics in multivariate statistical research in 1977. She worked at the Computing Center at Keele University until 1980. Subsequently, from 1982 until her retirement in 2004, she taught computer studies there. In 1998, she was a visiting researcher at the Institute for Computer Science and Society at the Universität Freiburg. Lecture and research trips took her to Sweden, Finland, Austria and Germany. She was active in the trade union movement at the university. As deputy chair and later chair of the association Women into Computing (founded 1987 in Great Britain), she advocated for women's issues in computer science at the British Computer Society, among others.

In 1998, she commented on her motivation for her commitment to women in computer science: There are many professional fields in which hardly any women work, but there are few where the proportion of female students is so low. Paradoxically, this – and the fact that computer science is still a relatively young subject – is also an opportunity: to explore why this is the case and to change things before they get stuck. As for me personally, I've always been fascinated by computers since I started working with them in the mid-sixties. But I never really felt like I belonged. Instead of wasting my energy fighting that feeling now, I decided to find out why.

In 2020 she published a collection of texts about women in computer science Righting the Wrong: Closing the Gender Gap in Computing.

== Research ==
Grundy taught and researched in computer science at Keele University, focusing on databases and systems development, and became increasingly interdisciplinary. Based on her experiences as a teacher in a male-dominated field, she turned to gender studies in computer science. Frances Grundy works on the relationship between gender and technology, gender and science, and in particular gender and IT.
