= Jyll Bradley =

English artist (born 1966)

- Born: 1966 (age 59–60); Folkestone, England, United Kingdom
- Education: Goldsmiths College (University of London); Slade School of Fine Art
- Known for: Installation art, sculpture
- Website: jyllbradley.com

Jyll Bradley (born 1966, in Folkestone) is an artist based in London. She makes installations, films, drawings and sculptures. She has produced public-realm projects such as 'Green/Light (for M.R.)' (2014), commissioned by the Folkestone Triennial, and 'Dutch Light' (2017), commissioned by Turner Contemporary (Margate).

== Education and early career ==
Bradley studied at Goldsmiths College (University of London) (1985–88) and the Slade School of Fine Art (1991–93). During her early career, Bradley created photographic light-box installations shown at The Showroom (London) in 1987, at Riverside Studios (London) in 1988, and in British Art Show 3 at Hayward Gallery (London) in 1990. As curator Caroline Collier has written, some of Bradley's early work "appeared to be singled out for attack by some reviewers", leading the artist to withdraw from the art world for a number of years. The next public showing of her visual artwork was at Spacex (Exeter) in 2003.

== Career in scriptwriting and radio ==
From 1998 to 2004, Bradley predominantly worked as a writer for BBC Radio, writing original radio dramas, making documentaries and dramatising novels with a focus on women's lives and stories. Her drama "Filet de Sole Veronique" (1997) won her the European Broadcasting Award for Best Script. 'Just Plain Gardening', an all female comedy set in a fictitious girls gardening school was commissioned for two series for Woman's Hour in 2002. In 1999 Bradley was the first person to adapt American writer Kate Chopin’s banned novel ‘The Awakening’ for radio marking the centenary of its publication. During the 1990's Bradley also wrote for stage and performance, including 'The Fruit has Turned into Jam in the Fields' (1995) commissioned by Scarlett Theatre which played at The Young Vic and 'On the Playing Fields on her Rejection' (1996) at the Drill Hall. Her play Girl, watching (2003), set in 1979, is about a fourteen-year-old female birdwatcher.

== Work ==
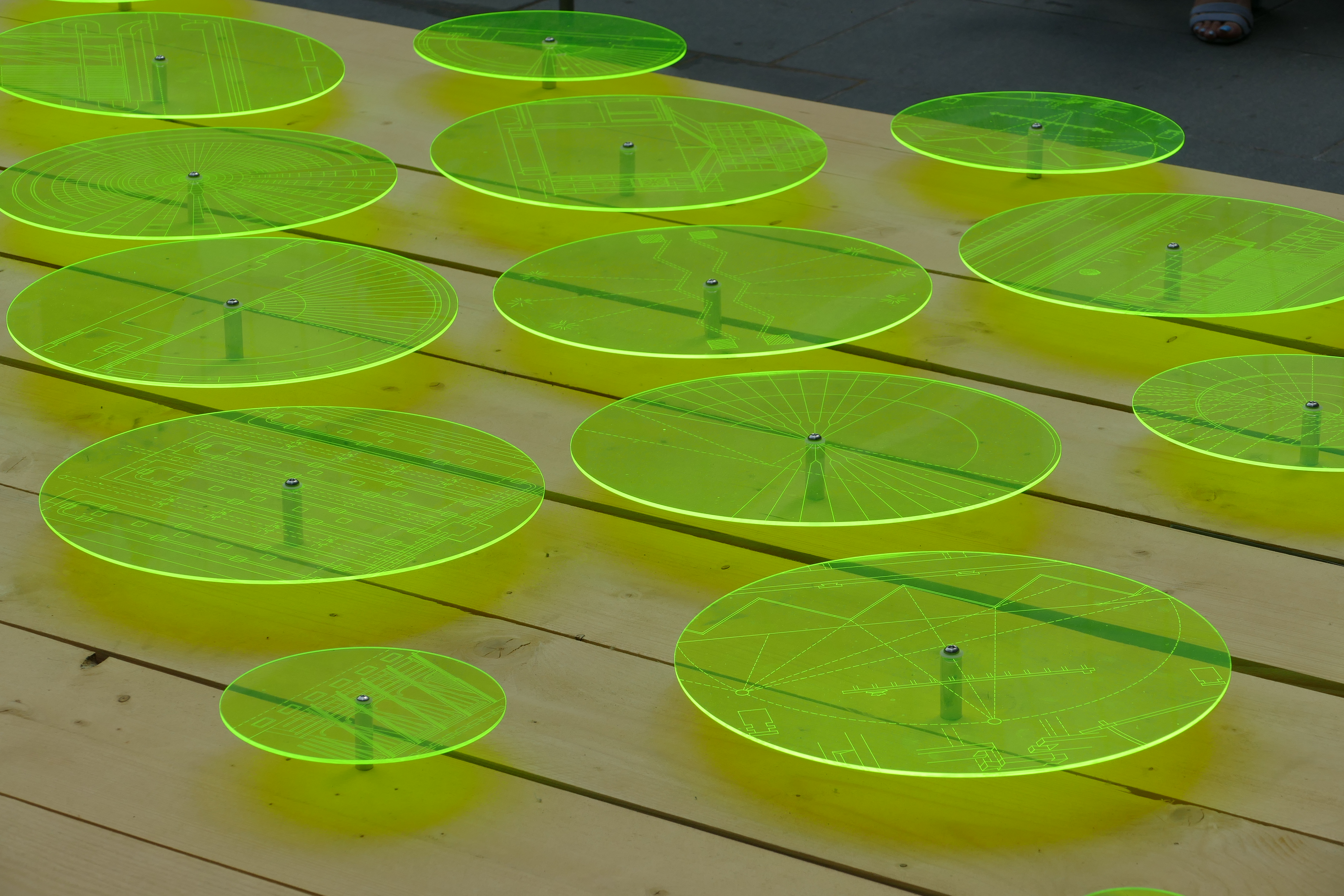
'Opening The Air' by Jyll Bradley, Saint Helen's Square, Sculpture in the City 2018

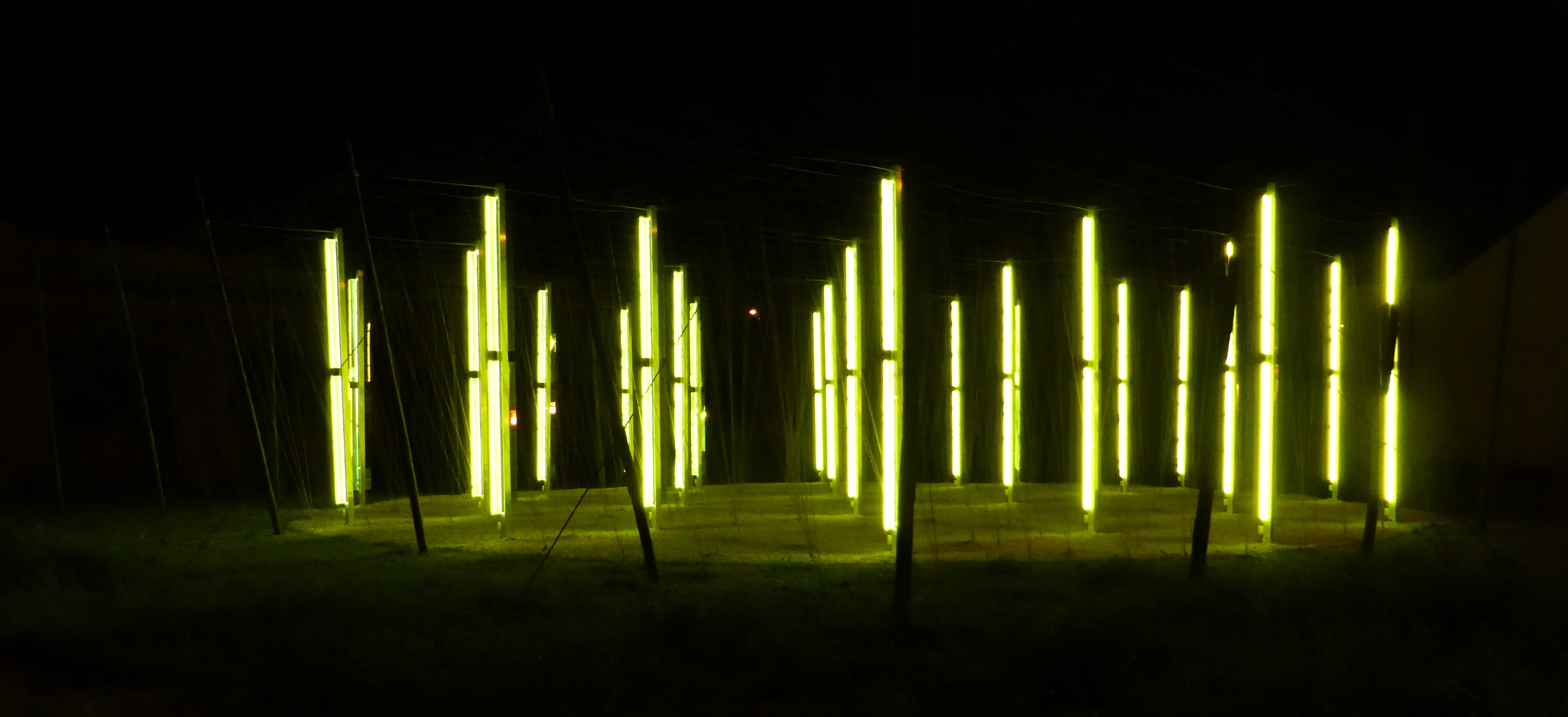
'Green/Light' by Jyll Bradley

Bradley's work uses the formal aesthetic and material qualities of minimalism to explore identity and place. Her work often brings together natural materials such as wood, with industrially produced materials such edge-lit plexiglass. Many of her works draw from horticultural practices and structures (such as the glass house, the hop garden, the Dutch light, the espalier) as the basis for both its form and its exploration of the relationship between people and place. Her large-scale public works have been used as sites for performance, reflecting Bradley's belief in "sculpture as a potent gathering place of people and ideas." She often works collaboratively, producing, for example, the film 'Pardes' (2020) with the Scottish Ensemble, the film 'Lean/In' (2021) with dance-artist and choreographer Michaela Cisarikova, with music by the Scottish rock band Cocteau Twins and 'Woman Holding a Balance' with fellow artist David Ward and composer Anna Clyne. In 2021 Bradley also made her autobiographical film 'M.R'. This work uses the visual frame of her Folkestone Triennial sculpture 'Green/Light (for M.R.)' as a way of exploring her story of adoption.

Reviewing a 2010 exhibition in Art Monthly, critic Gill Hedley wrote that Bradley's work "brings the very personal alongside genuinely public projects". A review of a 2011 exhibition in The Guardian, by Skye Sherwin and Robert Clark, saw her work as "a series of celebrations of Proustian memory."

== Selected exhibitions ==
=== Solo exhibitions and projects ===
- Jyll Bradley: Running and Returning, The Box, Plymouth, on display now - until 2 November 2025
- Threshold, Kaunas, Lithuania, European Capital of Culture, 2022
- Pardes, Fruitmarket, Edinburgh, 2021-22
- M.R. film, premiered at Folkestone Triennial 2021
- Woman Holding a Balance, film, commissioned and premiered by Orchestra of St Luke's, New York 2021
- Opening the Air, Sculpture in the City, London, 2018
- Dutch/Light Turner Contemporary, Margate, 2017–18
- Green/Light (for M.R.), The Folkestone Triennial, 2014 - present
- The friend I have/is a passionate friend, Mummery and Schnelle, London, 2014
- City of Trees, The National Library of Australia, for Centenary of Canberra, Australia, 2013
- Airports for the Lights, Shadows and Particles, The Bluecoat, Liverpool, 2011
- Botanic Garden, Walker Art Gallery, Liverpool, 2009

=== Group exhibitions and Projects ===
- Drawing Biennial, The Drawing Room, London, 2021
- Trees Die Stand, Pi Artworks, London, 2021
- Art Cabinet, StudioK3, Zurich, Switzerland, 2020
- Carbon Copy, with Bridget Smith, HSBC Collections, Canary Wharf, 2019
- Some Islands, Coleman Projects, London, 2018
- Neo-Geometry, New Art Centre, Roche Court, 2017
- Drawing Biennial, The Drawing Room, London, 2015
- The Negligent Eye, The Bluecoat, 2014
- Green/Light (for M.R.), Folkestone Triennial, 2014
- Jyll Bradley and Stuart Brisley, Mummery+Schnelle, 2013
- point-horizon-structure, Mummery+Schnelle, 2012
- Galápagos, Calouste Gulbenkian Foundation, Lisbon, Portugal, The Fruitmarket Gallery, Edinburgh, 2012
- Human Cargo (with Melanie Jackson and Lisa Cheung), Plymouth City Museum and Art Gallery, 2007
- This Storm is What We Call Progress, Arnolfini, Bristol, 2005
- British Art Show 3, The Hayward Gallery and tour, 1990
- Interim Jeune, with Michael Landy and Serge Kliaving, Interim Art, London, 1989
- Show and Tell, Riverside Studios, London, 1988
