= South London Gallery =

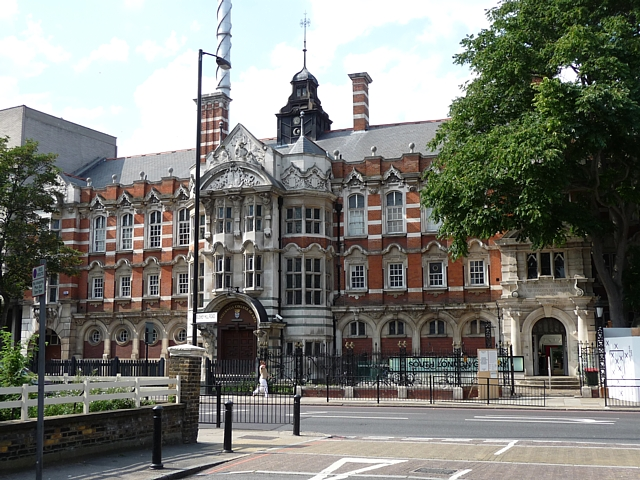

- Location within Greater London
- Established: 1879; 147 years ago
- Location: London
- Coordinates: 51°28′27″N 0°4′47″W
- Type: Art gallery
- Website: http://www.southlondongallery.org

The South London Gallery, founded 1891, is a public-funded gallery of contemporary art in Camberwell, London. Until 1992, it was known as the South London Art Gallery, and nowadays the acronym SLG is often used. Margot Heller became its director in 2001.

== Gallery ==
=== History ===
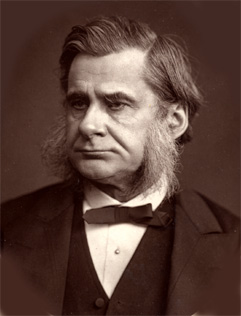
Thomas Henry Huxley

The gallery traces its origins back to the South London Working Men's College at 91 Blackfriars Road in 1868, whose Principal was the biologist Thomas Henry Huxley, the grandfather of Aldous Huxley; the Manager was William Rossiter. In 1878, the College relocated to 143 Kennington Lane, where a Free Library was also opened. In 1879 Rossiter staged an art show of privately owned works at the Library. After this the name was changed to the Free Library and Art Gallery. In 1881, the library and gallery moved again to New Road, Battersea, and in 1887 to 207 Camberwell Road.

Leading artists such as Sir Frederic Leighton, President of the Royal Academy, Edward Burne-Jones and G. F. Watts supported the institution; the Prime Minister, William Ewart Gladstone, was its first president, succeeded by Leighton in 1887.

On 4 May 1891, the South London Fine Art Gallery opened in Peckham Road in a new building in the grounds of Portland House, whose freehold Rossiter had purchased. In 1893, the Prince of Wales officially opened a lecture hall and library funded by newspaper owner John Passmore Edwards. In 1896, the Gallery was relocated at the Vestry of Camberwell. In 1898, Royal Academy President, Sir Edward Poynter opened a Technical Institute, which again had been funded by Passmore Edwards (to commemorate Lord Leighton who had died) on the site of Portland House. It later became Camberwell College of Art, which was run by the London County Council from 1904, though the Gallery was still under the local authority.

The Gallery added to its permanent collection in 1953, to celebrate the coronation, with works by contemporary artists such as John Piper and Christopher Wood, and the next decade acquired over 500 twentieth-century prints. The new London Borough of Southwark took over responsibility for the Gallery in 1965 but under independent trustees.

=== Modern phase ===
The appointment of David Thorp as Director in 1992 brought what then came to be known as the South London Gallery into its present phase, when it espoused Britart and staged significant "cutting edge" exhibitions.

The Gallery was the first venue for the showing of Tracey Emin's "tent", Everyone I Have Ever Slept With 1963–1995, when Carl Freedman curated the Minky Manky show in 1995. The show catalogue includes an interview with Emin. Other artists in the show were Sarah Lucas, Gary Hume, Damien Hirst, Mat Collishaw, Gilbert and George, Critical Décor and Stephen Pippin. Freedman said one of the show's themes was:

the artist as a subject, and (to) explore the relationship between the art on the wall and its creator, to make the whole thing more humanistic. And in there somewhere there is the beginnings of a thesis on the relationship and similarities between madness and modernism, for example, defiance of authority, nihilism, examples of extreme relativism, strange transformations of the self, irrationality, and things like that.

Minky Manky then went to the Arnolfini gallery, Bristol. Two years later Emin staged a solo show I Need Art Like I Need God, which included a debate with artist Billy Childish about their former relationship.

A strong programme of exhibitions gained the gallery increased publicity and greater visitor numbers, as well as a place in the 1996 Prudential Awards for the Arts, and a nomination for Thorp in 1997 for the Prudential Creative Britons Award. Exhibitors included Anselm Kiefer and Gavin Turk. Works were acquired by artists such as Antony Gormley, Anish Kapoor and Tracey Emin, Sarah Lucas and Angus Fairhurst.

In 1999, Curator Donna Lynas began a Live Art programme, which incurred some controversy, with performances including Franko B and Stuart Brisley.

In 2001, Margot Heller became Director continuing to develop the gallery's international reputation for its programme of contemporary art exhibitions and live art events, with integrated education projects for children, young people and adults. Five exhibitions each year profile the work of established international figures such as Tom Friedman, Mark Dion, Rivane Neuenschwander, Alfredo Jaar, Eva Rothschild, Ryan Gander and Superflex; as well as that by younger and mid-career artists such as Alice Channer and Oscar Murillo. Group shows bring together works by established and lesser known British and international artists. The gallery’s live art and film programme has included presentations by Rachel Gomme, Nathaniel Mellors, Gail Pickering, OMSK and Gisele Vienne, and occasional large scale off-site projects have included those by on Kawara in Trafalgar Square in 2004, and Chris Burden at Chelsea College of Art Parade Ground in 2006.

== Location ==
The South London Gallery is at 65 Peckham Road, London SE5 8UH. It is open Wednesday to Sunday, 12pm–6pm, Wednesdays until 9pm. Exhibitions are free.
