= Alice Channer =

British sculptor based in London

Alice Channer (born 1977) is a British sculptor based in London. Known for her sculptures and mixed media works that explore our relationship to objects, Channer uses materials ranging from metal and concrete to textiles and paper.

== Early life and education ==
Alice Channer was born at Oxford in England. As a child, her mother handcrafted toys, clothes, bags, curtains and upholstery for the family. Channer has said, "I did not have a father who was an architect, I had a mother who was a seamstress." She graduated in 2006 with a BA in Fine Art from Goldsmiths College in London and in 2008 with an MA in Sculpture from the Royal College of Art in London. She lives and works in London.

== Work ==
Channer creates sculptures that address the distortion of materials and absence of human bodies within a postindustrial environment, often stretching objects to warp their position within the landscape. She uses items such as rocks, clothing, and shampoo bottles, which she then mutates through casting or expanding to monumental scales. Many of her sculptures and works on paper relate to personal adornment and the wearing and display of clothing. More recently, Channer has been making rock sculptures, and for the last few years, she has been collecting fragments of concrete around her studio in London, left over from construction projects within the urban environment. The artist takes these human-made rocks, all small enough to fit in her backpack, back to her studio to create 3-D scans that are stretched out digitally, up to six feet. The new forms are then carved by a CNC router (computer-controlled cutting machine) into foam in order to create molds for different materials.

== Exhibitions ==
Channer's work has been shown internationally. Her first museum show in the United States, R o c k f a l l, was at the Aspen Art Museum from 13 February to 31 May 2015, which then traveled to New York as part of a group show organized by the Public Art Fund. Her solo exhibitions include: Soft Shell, Kunstverein Freiburg, Germany, Invertebrates, Out Of Body, The Hepworth Wakefield, West Yorkshire, UK (both 2013); and South London Gallery, London (2012). Select group exhibitions include: In A Dream You Saw A Way To Survive And You Were Full Of Joy, Hayward Gallery (traveling to The Whitworth, Manchester; De La Warr Pavilion, Bexhill-on-Sea; Glynn Vivian Art Gallery, Swansea; 2016–17); Wer Nicht Denken Will, Fleigt Raus, Museum Kurhaus Kleve, Germany (2016); Chat Jet (Part 2) – Sculpture in Reflection, Künstlerhaus, Halle für Kunst & Medien, Graz, Austria, Nature after Nature, Fridericianum, Kassel, Germany, Pool, Kestnergesellschaft, Hanover, Germany (all 2014); Il Palazzo Enciclopedico / The Encyclopedic Palace, 55th Venice Biennale (2013); and Glasgow International, UK (2010).

== Collections ==
Channer's work is in collections such as the Arts Council Collection, the Tate Permanent Collection, the Guggenheim Permanent Collection, the Pérez Art Museum Miami, Florida, the Aïshti Foundation in Beirut; D. Daskalopoulos Collection, Athens, Greece; UBS Art Collection, Zürich; Government Art Collection, London; Nottingham City Art Gallery and the Zabludowicz Collection in London.
