= Harry Grundy (footballer, born 1883) =

English footballer

Personal information
- Full name: Thomas Henry Grundy
- Date of birth: 15 March 1883
- Place of birth: Neston, Cheshire
- Date of death: 1948 (aged 64)
- Place of death: Birkenhead, Cheshire
- Position: Outside left

Senior career*
Years	Team	Apps	(Gls)
–	Chirk		
–	Neston		
1904–1905	Wrexham	1	(0)
1905–1908	Everton	2	(0)
1906–1907	Reading		
1908–1909	Lincoln City (Note: Lincoln City infobox statistics include appearances in the Football League only. Free-access section of the Lincoln City FC Archive do not distinguish between Midland League and FA Cup appearances.)	6	(0)
- * Club domestic league appearances and goals

Thomas Henry Grundy (15 March 1883 – 1948) was an English footballer who made eight appearances in the Football League playing for Everton and Lincoln City. He played as an outside left. He also played in the Midland League for Lincoln City, and in the Southern and Western Leagues for Reading.

== Life and career ==
Grundy was born in Neston, Cheshire, to William and Elizabeth Grundy. He played football for nearby Chirk, Wrexham and Neston before joining First Division club Everton in November 1905 at a wage of £2 a week and a signing-on bonus of £5. He made his debut on 20 December, in a goalless draw away to Middlesbrough, and played his second and what turned out to be final first-team game for the club a few weeks later, in a 4–2 defeat at Newcastle United. After some consideration, Everton chose not to re-engage Grundy for the coming season, and placed him on the transfer list at a fee of £25.

As there were no takers from the Football League, Grundy was allowed to join non-league club Reading. The Daily Express wrote that much was expected of the player, who had "shown himself to be very speedy; he accurately centres when going at top speed, and his foot-work generally is admirable". Grundy played for Reading in both Southern and Western Leagues. Everton retained Grundy's Football League registration until April 1908, when he was allowed to leave on a free transfer.

He signed for Lincoln City, then bottom of the Second Division, in time to play in the last three games of the season, but Lincoln were unable to improve their position. They failed to be re-elected to the Football League, and were accepted into the Midland League for 1908–09. Grundy missed just two games in league and FA Cup as Lincoln won the Midland League title, but played only three more first-team matches after their election back to the Football League.
