= Jimmy Grundy =

American politician (1923–2020)

Member of the Kentucky House of Representatives
- In office 1956–1958

Personal details
- Born: James Caldwell Grundy Jr. March 22, 1923 Lebanon, Kentucky, U.S.
- Died: May 2, 2020 (aged 97) Lebanon, Kentucky, U.S.
- Party: Republican
- Education: University of Kentucky

James Caldwell Grundy Jr. (March 22, 1923 – May 2, 2020) was an American politician and businessman.

Grundy was born in Lebanon, Kentucky. He went to the Lebanon public schools and to University of Kentucky. Grundy was involved in business in Marion County, Kentucky. Grundy served in the Kentucky House of Representatives from 1956 to 1958 and was involved with the Republican Party, chairing the Marion County Republican Committee from 1960 to 1970. He died in Lebanon, Kentucky on May 2, 2020.
