= Harry Grundy (footballer, born 1893) =

English footballer

Personal information
- Full name: Harry Grundy
- Date of birth: 18 September 1893
- Place of birth: Little Hulton, England
- Date of death: 1979 (aged 85–86)
- Position: Full-back

Senior career*
Years	Team	Apps	(Gls)
1911–1912	Rothwells Athletic		
1912–1913	Wharton Lads		
1913–1914	Little Lever Colliery		
1914–1929	Oldham Athletic	279	(0)
Total		279	(0)
- * Club domestic league appearances and goals

Harry Grundy (18 September 1893 – 1979) was an English footballer who played in the Football League for Oldham Athletic.
