= Outpost (gallery) =

Outpost gallery

OUTPOST Gallery
- Established: 2004
- Location: 10b Wensum Street, Tombland, Norwich, Norfolk
- Type: Art Gallery
- Website: www.norwichoutpost.org

Outpost gallery, stylised as OUTPOST, was founded in 2004 and is an artist-run space based in Norwich showcasing contemporary art. Operating as a not-for-profit entity, Outpost is entirely managed by volunteers and governed by a steering committee composed of up to eight local artists and practitioners.

The gallery has hosted over 150 exhibitions featuring artists such as Sadé Mica, Puppies Puppies, Turner Prize nominee Karla Black, Turner Prize winner Elizabeth Price, and Bill Drummond.

Since 2010, Outpost has managed a studio complex, known as Outpost Studios, at Gildengate House in Anglia Square, formerly the county records office. houses over 80 artist and practitioner studios.

== History ==
The gallery is based on the model of Glasgow's Transmission Gallery which itself was copied from the model of New 57 gallery, Edinburgh. This model dictates that the gallery is run by a voluntary group of up to eight members who have a limit of two years of service, meaning power is constantly shifting. This model has been shared and followed widely, acting as the blueprint for Generator (Dundee), Embassy (Edinburgh), Catalyst Arts (Belfast) and 126 gallery (Galway). The founding Outpost committee was Kaavous Clayton, Julia Devonshire, Robert Filby, Neil Smallbone, Jay Barsby, Phil Gardner, Stephanie Douet and Sarah Horton. The name is a reference to a former artist-led space in Norwich named Frontier.

Outpost gallery began as a project headed by the interns working on EASTinternational. EASTinternational was, at its time, one of England's biggest annual exhibitions and was hosted in The Norwich Gallery at Norwich University of the Arts and spread across the city. Held every summer running from 1991 to 2009 and curated by Lynda Morris, Professor of Curation and Art History at Norwich University of the Arts, it showed work from artists all over the world. Morris attended a symposium on artist-led spaces in 2002, which sparked her decision to permit funding for EASTinternational to be used to establish Outpost.

In 2016, Outpost applied for and was granted the status of Charitable Incorporated Organisation, trading as Norwich Outpost under the title "#FBF696". The charity's name references the yellow HTML colour code #FBF696 that has been used for branding and marketing by the gallery since its founding.

In December 2024, Norwich City Council bought Anglia Square with the intention to redevelop the area. As a result, the artists in Gildengate House, which consisted of 85 individuals (almost 100 of which were Outpost members) who paid £110 per month to rent the space, were handed a three-month eviction notice one month earlier than expected, telling them to leave by 28 February.
