= Cubitt Artists =

British arts organisation

Coordinates: 51.532488°N 0.107274°W

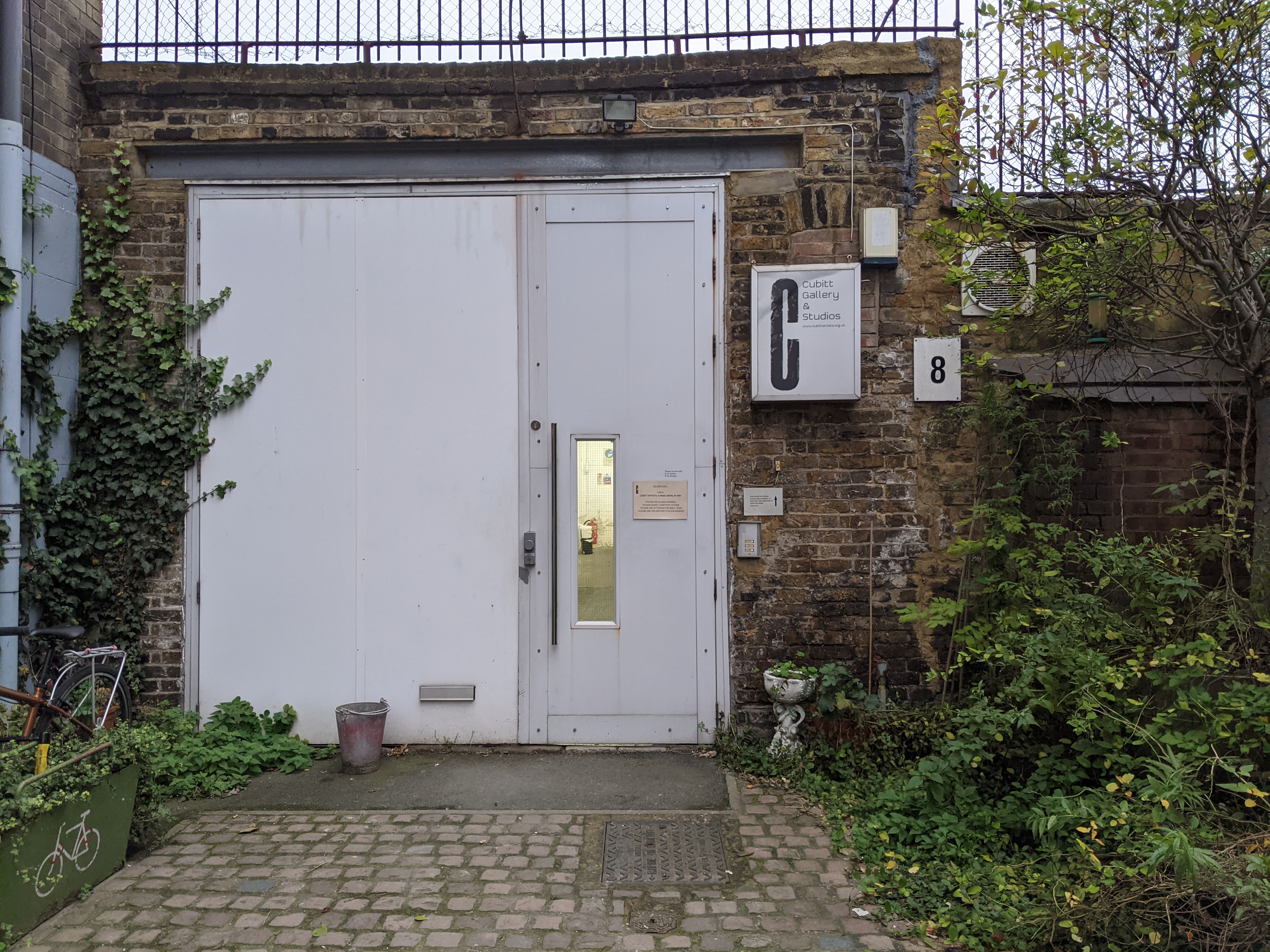
Cubitt Gallery and Studios, Angel Mews

Cubitt Artists is a British artist-run art gallery, artist studios and art educator, founded in 1991. Cubitt was first located in Goods Way in London's Kings Cross area, moved to Cubitt Street (from which it takes its current name), later to Caledonia Street, and is now located at Angel. In January 2026, it was announced that Cubitt's lease in Angel would not be renewed, and that the gallery would have to move in October 2026.

== Cubitt Gallery ==
The Cubitt Gallery is funded by Arts Council England allowing it to offer the 18-month Cubitt Curatorial Fellowship to emerging curators (previously named the Curatorial Bursary from 2001 to 2015). Past Cubitt curators are:

- Polly Staple (July 2001 – January 2003)
- Emily Pethick (March 2003 – August 2004)
- David Bussel (September 2004 – February 2006)
- Tom Morton (April 2006 – August 2007)
- Bart van der Heide (October 2007 – March 2009)
- Michelle Cotton (April 2009 – November 2010)
- Fiona Parry (December 2010 – May 2012)
- Jamie Stevens (June 2012 – December 2013)
- Fatima Hellberg (January 2014 – June 2015)
- Morgan Quaintance (July 2015 – December 2016)
- Louise Shelly (July 2018 – December 2019)
- Languid Hands (2020 - 2022)

The current recipient of the curatorial fellowship is Seán Elder. The Cubitt Gallery has displayed work from a wide range of notable artists, including Adam Chodzko, Aleksandra Mir, Allen Ruppersberg, Angela Bulloch, Billy Childish, Boris Groys (Thinking in Loop, 2008), Carol Bove, Cathy Wilkes, David Robbins, Florian Hecker, Gunter Förg, Gustav Metzger (Eichmann and the Angel, 2005), Harun Farocki, Henri Chopin, Ida Applebroog, Jack Goldstein, Jimmy Robert (Figure de Style, 2008), Kenneth Anger, Marjetica Potrč, Matthew Day Jackson, Paul Noble, Tacita Dean, Willem de Rooij ("Birds", 2009) and Tris Vonna Michell (Tall Tales and Short Stories, 2007), Ajamu (Archival Sensoria, 2020), R.I.P Germain (Dead Yard, 2020) and Camara Taylor (a rant! a reel!, 2021).

To support the ongoing artistic programme of the Gallery, a limited edition set titled the Cubitt Print Box was offered for sale in 2000. This is a set of twenty works produced by contemporary artists Alex Katz (Dark Eyes, 2000), Ceal Floyer (Etching (at 45 rpm), 2000), Chris Ofili (no title, 2000), Elizabeth Wright (Snowball, 2000), Gareth Jones (Diamond, 2000), Giorgio Sadotti (Don't Look, 2000), Hilary Lloyd (Shopfront, 2000), James Pyman (On the Sound, 2000), Jane Simpson (Sunset Still Life, 2000), Jochen Klein (Untitled, 2000), Martin Creed (Work No. 233, 2000), Matthew Higgs (Despair, 2000), Paul McCarthy (Dog, 2000), Paul Noble (Playframe, 2000), Peter Doig (Echo Lake, 2000), Peter Pommerer (Giraffe with Blue Coloured Eyes, 2000), Piotr Uklański (no title, 2000), Scott King (Joy Division, The Moonlight Club, 4 April 1980, West Hampstead, London, England, 2000), Tacita Dean (Aerial View of Teignmouth Electron, Cayman Brac 16th of September 1998, 2000) and Wolfgang Tillmans (Faltenwurf (Cubitt Edition), 2000).

== Cubitt Studios ==
Cubitt Studios provides central London studio space for up to 30 artists at any given time. Former notable members of Cubitt include Chris Ofili, Dinos and Jake Chapman, Matthew Higgs and Peter Doig.

== See also ==
- UK artist-run initiatives
- Artist-run space
- Art group
