= Lynda Morris =

British curator (born 1947)

- Born: 1947 (age 78–79); Gourock, Scotland
- Education: Canterbury College of Art
- Occupation: Art curator
- Notable work: EASTinternational, Picasso: Peace and Freedom

Lynda Morris (born 1947) is a British curator. She has worked with numerous artists including Richard Hamilton and Gilbert and George and given several internationally renowned artists, such as Agnes Martin, Bernd and Hilla Becher and Gerhard Richter, their first exhibitions in the United Kingdom. Morris has made a significant contribution to the development of contemporary art in the UK through her commitment to supporting emerging artists and through the organisation of EASTinternational, an annual open submission exhibition that took place in Norwich from 1991–2009. Morris is emeritus professor of curation and art history at Norwich University of the Arts.

== Early life and curatorial projects ==
Morris was born in 1947 in Gourock, Scotland. She studied painting at Canterbury College of Art from 1964 to 1969. Between 1969 and 1971, she worked at the Institute of Contemporary Arts (ICA), London, first, in 1969, on the installation of the seminal exhibition of conceptual art When Attitudes Become Form: Works-Concepts-Processes-Situations-Information, curated by Harald Szeemann, and Keinholtz 10 Tableau. While working at the ICA, Morris took over the catalogue stand and developed their first bookshop.

== Nigel Greenwood and the Royal College of Art ==
From 1971 to 1974, Morris worked for the art dealer Nigel Greenwood, organising the exhibition Book as Artwork 1960–72 with Germano Celant – the first exhibition dedicated to artists' books with accompanying catalogue. Morris began an MA at the Royal College of Art. During this time she worked with the Arts Council to organise a touring exhibition – their first UK exhibition – of photographers Bernd & Hilla Becher. In 1974, Morris submitted her MA thesis on art and art education with case studies on art and language courses at Coventry College of Art, Joseph Beuys at Düsseldorf Academy and the Projects Class at Nova Scotia College of Art and Design in Halifax, Canada.

== The Slade ==
In 1973, Morris was Richard Hamilton’s assistant for his major retrospective at the Guggenheim Museum, New York. From 1974 to 1976 she taught at the Slade School with William Coldstream, Euan Uglow and Lucian Freud. While working at the Slade, Morris hosted a screening of Marcel Broodthaers' film Figures of Wax (Jeremy Bentham) beside University College London's waxwork of Bentham.

== The Midland Group ==
In 1977, Morris relocated to Nottingham to be the curator at The Midland Group, Nottingham. Here she organised a programme of exhibitions including Towards Another Picture with Andrew Brighton, Terry Atkinson's First World War Pictures (both 1977), Gerhard Richter’s 48 Portraits (1978), René Magritte Photography and Films and Nigel Henderson's Photographs of Bethnal Green 1949–1952 (both 1978).

== Norwich Gallery ==
In 1980, Morris relocated to Norwich, Norfolk, to run the Norwich School of Art gallery and teach art history. Morris renamed the gallery Norwich Gallery. She would go on to curate Norwich Gallery until its closure in 2007.

In 1982, she curated Artists' International Association 1933 to 1953 – a history of British artists covering the Spanish Civil War, the Artists' Refugee Committee, World War Two and the Cold War – at Modern Art Oxford. The catalogue for this exhibition remains the authoritative work on the AIA. In 1985, she interviewed DDR artists who spent 1939–1945 in London and edited Third Text 15: British Art and Immigration 1870-1990.

From 1980 to 2012, she taught at Norwich School of Art and Design (now Norwich University of the Arts) with John Wonnacott, John Lessore, Ed Middleditch and Nigel Henderson.

Morris curated About Life: John Wonnacott & John Lessore at East Gallery and Norwich Castle, which opened in November 2014.

In 2010, Picasso Peace and Freedom, co-curated by Morris with then director of Tate Liverpool, Christopher Grunenberg, opened at Tate Liverpool. This major exhibition, which explored the socialist elements of Picasso and his work, was the culmination of 30 years of research by Morris.

== EASTinternational ==
EASTinternational was an annual open submission exhibition that took place from 1991 to 2009 in Norwich Gallery and the historic buildings of Norwich University of the Arts. Two different selectors were invited each year, and included Konrad Fischer, Richard Long, Lawrence Weiner, Marian Goodman, Peter Doig, Jeremy Deller, Nicholas Logsdail and Neo Rauch among others. In this time it became the largest international open submission exhibition in the UK.

Exhibiting artists have included several Turner Prize nominees and winners whose work first came to prominence through the exhibition including Martin Creed, Barbara Walker, Tomoko Takahashi, as well as many artists who have gone on to have significant reputations within contemporary art such as Rose Wylie, Phyllida Barlow and Lucy McKenzie.

== Selected exhibition and related publications ==
- Book as Artwork 1960–1972 Nigel Greenwood Gallery, September 1972. Publication Book as Artwork 1960 to 1972, Germano Celant and Lynda Morris.
- Strata, Ellsworth Kelly, Agnes Martin, Brice Marden, Robert Ryman. Royal College of Art Gallery 1973. Publication Strata, Lynda Morris.
- Agnes Martin Scottish National Gallery of Modern Art, Edinburgh 1974. Publication Agnes Martin Lynda Morris and David Brown. First showing in Britain.
- Ian Breakwell Midland Group Nottingham 1976. Publication Ian Breakwell Diary Pages.
- Terry Atkinson: First World War Paintings. Midland Group Nottingham 1976. Tour Robert Self Gallery London. Publication Notes. by the artist. Midland Group Nottingham and Robert Self Gallery.
- Gerhard Richter Forty-Eight Portraits, Midland Group Nottingham 1978, first showing in Britain Publication Gerhart Richter Forty-Eight Portraits.
- René Magritte: Photography and film Midland Group Nottingham 1978. Publication René Magritte's Photography. 1977.
- Nigel Henderson Photographs of Bethnal Green 1949 to 1952, Midland Group Nottingham 1979. Publication Nigel Henderson Photographs of Bethnal Green 1949 to 1952, Judith Stephens' Diary edited by Lynda Morris.
- John Berger, Joan Moar: Text and Image, Midland Group Nottingham 1979. Conference at Nottingham Playhouse with Richard Ayres, Howard Brenton, David Hare, Barry Hines and Gus MacDonald.
- David Hockney Print Retrospective 1954 to 1979, Midland Group Nottingham and the Scottish Arts Council in association with the Petersburg Press 1980. Tour Aberdeen Museum and Art Gallery, The Fruit Market Gallery Edinburgh, Third Eye Centre Glasgow, Paisley Museum and Art Gallery, Southampton Museum and Art Gallery, Cartwright Hall Museum and Art Gallery Bradford, The Museum and Art Gallery Stoke on Trent, Walker Art Gallery Liverpool, Cardiff City Museum and Art Gallery. Publication David Hockney the Complete Prints 1954 to 1979, Andrew Brighton. Midland Group and the Scottish Arts Council 1980.
- Nigel Henderson Heads Eye Wyn, Norwich School of Art Gallery 1981.Tour Graves Art Gallery Sheffield, John Hansard Gallery Southampton University, The Minories Colchester and Serpentine Gallery London. Publication Heads Eye Wyn, Dr Christopher Mullen and the artist.
- Artists International Association 1933 TO 1953 Museum of Modern Art Oxford 1982. Publication Artists International Association 1933 to 1953, Lynda Morris and Robert Radford. Tour Fruit Market Gallery Edinburgh, Midland Group Nottingham, Cartwright Hall Bradford, Ferens Art Gallery Hull, Camden Arts Centre London.
- Henry Tonks and the Art of Pure Drawing, Norwich School of Art Gallery 1984. Publication Henry Tonks and the Art of Pure Drawing, edited by Lynda Morris, contributors Helen Lessore, Sir William Coldstream, Roy Oxlade, Andrew Brighton, Julian Freeman and edited writings by the artist, Sir Thomas Monnington P.P.R.A. and David Bomberg.
- Spitting Image Fluck and Law, Norwich School of Art Gallery 1985. Tour Third Eye Centre Glasgow, Museum and Art Gallery Rochdale.
- Paul Hogarth Cold War Reports 1947 to 1967 Norwich Gallery: Norfolk Institute of Art and Design 1989 touring to Kent County Council Museums and Libraries Ramsgate and Maidstone and Scunthorpe Museums and Art Galleries. Publication Paul Hogarth Cold War Reports 1947 to 1967, Introduction by John Berger, text Paul Hogarth, edited by Lynda Checketts.
- EAST National Open Exhibition, selected by Andrew Brighton and Sandy Moffat, Norwich Gallery, Norfolk Institute of Art and Design 1991. Publication EAST texts by Lynda Morris, Manuel Chetcuti, Andrew Brighton and Sandy Moffat, page on each of 60 artists.
- 4 X 4, organised and edited by Eddie Chambers, Lynda Morris essay on Medina Hammid, 1991 Arnolfini Bristol, Leicester and Wolverhampton Museums 1991
- EAST National Open Exhibition selected by Marjorie Althorpe-Guyton and Helen Chadwick Norwich Gallery and Norfolk Institute of Art & Design 1992. Publication EAST texts by Lynda Morris, Manuel Chetcuti, Marjorie Althorpe-Guyton and a page on each of 45 artists.
- EAST 93 selected by David Tremlett and Konrad Fischer, Norwich Gallery and Norfolk Institute of Art & Design 1993. Tour: Minories Colchester, Howard Gardens Gallery Cardiff, Flaxman Gallery Stoke on Trent. Publication EASTtexts by Lynda Morris, Manuel Chetcuti two pages on each of 34 artists. Award Kenny Hunter
- Menschenwelt Martin Honert, Michael Bach, Hermann Pitz, Wolfgang Schlegel, Luc Tuymans, Maureen Connor, Gisella Bullacher Publication edited by Martin Henschel Tour Portikus Frankfurt, Castello de Rivera, kunstverein Stuttgard, Kunstverein Munster 1994
- EAST 94 selected by Rudi Fuchs and Jan Dibbets, Norwich Gallery and Norfolk Institute of Art & Design 1993. Publication EASTtexts by Lynda Morris, Rudi Fuchs two pages on each of 36 artists Award Stephanie Smith.
- EASTinternational 95 selected by Giuseppe Penone and Marian Goodman, Norwich Gallery and SCVA UEA, Publication EASTtexts by Giuseppe Penone, Lynda Morris, William Jeffett abd Manuel Chetcuti two pages on each of 36 artists. Award Mary Evans
- Terry Atkinson: Histories Biographies and Collaborations Norwich Gallery Norwich school of Art & Design 1996. Tour Collective Gallery Edinburgh and conference with Joseph Kosuth August 1996. Publication Dispatch Texts by Terry Atkinson and Lynda Morris. Conference Politics and Conceptualism: The Refurbishment of Conceptualism, with Terry Atkinson, Peter Townsend and Seth Siegelaub.
- EASTinternational 1996 selected by Richard Long and Roger Ackling Norwich Gallery and SCVA UEA, Publication EASTtexts by Lynda Morris, William Jeffett two pages on each of 33 artists. Award Jacqueline Mesmaeker.
- One Night Stands Jeremy Deller, Ross Sinclair, Alan Kane, Bob and Roberta Smith, Haley Newman, Brian Catling etc Norwich Gallery 1997 Tour Jeremy Deller Manic Street Preachers commission also shown at Cabinet Gallery.
- IMPRINT 93 curated by Matthew Higgs Cabinet Gallery, City Racing, Chris Ofili, Stephen Willats, Martin Creed, Billy Childish etc Norwich Gallery 1997.
- EASTinternational 1997 selected by Nicholas Logsdail and Tacita Dean Norwich Gallery and SCVA UEA, Publication EASTtext by Lynda Morris two pages on each of 31 artists Award Tomoko Takahashi
- Oktober 1917-1997 Fiona Banner Cornford and Cross Laura Emsley, Ian Hamilton Finlay, Kendell Geers, David King, David Mabb, Mike Nelson, Jan-Peter Sonntag, Louise K Wilson, Norwich Gallery
- EASTinternational 1998 selected by Alan Charlton and Michel Durand Dessert Norwich Gallery, Publication EASTtext by Lynda Morris two pages on each of 25 artists Award Martin McGinn Norwich Gallery and 30 Underwood Street Publication Tim Allen Matthew Higgs and
- Tim Allen Norwich Gallery and 30 Underwood Street Publication Tim Allen and Matthew Higgs
- EASTinternational 1999 selected by Peter Doig and Roy Arden Norwich Gallery, Publication EAST text by Lynda Morris two pages on each of 28 artists Award Lucy McKenzie riverside outdoor commissions Kjetil Berge, Cornford and Cross, Tazro Nascino, Tom Woolford and Elizabeth Wright
- Pictures of Pictures Hurvin Anderson, Michel Bach, Eberhard Havekost, Rosa Loy, Shibu Natesan, Eugene Palmer, David Rayson, Carol Rhodes, Thomas Scheibitz, Andreas Schön, George Shaw, Tim Stoner, Stephen Waddell. Curation and text Lynda Morris Norwich Gallery/Arnolfini Bristol 2000 ISBN 978-1-872482-37-8
- EAST 2000 selected by Keith Piper and Sebastian Lopez Publication EAST 2000 text by Lynda Morris Award Hew Locke and Jananne Al Ani
- On General Release Artists Film and Video 1968 to 1972 curated by Lynda Morris and David Curtis tour John Hansard Gallery Southampton, Maidstone KIAD, Institute of Visual Culture Cambridge, Mead Art Gallery University of Warwick
- EASTinternational 2001 selectors Mary Kelly and Peter Wollen
- EASTinternational 2002 selectors Lawrence Weiner and Jack Wendler
- Andrew Logan Alternative Miss World Filmshow 1972 to 2002 Norwich Gallery and St Albans
- Jeff Wall Landscapes Manchester Art Gallery and Norwich Castle Museum publication by Lynda Morris conference and lecture
- EASTinternational 2003 selectors Toby Webster and Eva Rothschild and publication
- Marc Camille Chaimowicz Jean Cocteau tour to Angel Row Nottingham, Cabinet London, Art Forum article, and development of the exhibition toured throughout Europe and US.
- EASTinternational 2004 selectors Neo Rauch and Gerd Harry Lybke
- Ready to Shoot Gerry Schum collaboration with Kunsthalle Dusseldorf Ready to Shoot Gerry Schum Conference Norwich Gallery convenor and editor Lynda Morris text ‘New Research into Conceptualism in Europe’, Sophie Richard, Catherine Moseley et al ISBN 978-3-936859-15-7
- EASTinternational 2005 selectors Gustav Metzger
- Horace Ove Pressure Black pioneer filmmaker and photographer lecture and film shows
- EASTinternational 2006 selectors Jeremy Deller and Dirk Snauwaert
- Rafał Bujnowski collaboration with Bunkier Sztuki Krakow
- John Stezaker Photo collages lecture publication Lynda Morris and K Fijalkowski
- EASTinternational 2007 selectors Matthew Higgs and Marc Camille Chaimowicz
- EASTinternational 2009 selectors Art and Language and Raster Gallery
- Picasso: Peace and Freedom 2010 ISBN 978-1-85437-952-8
