= Oliver Payne and Nick Relph =

British artists and filmmakers

Oliver Payne and Nick Relph are British artist-filmmakers who have collaborated since 1999. Payne was born in 1977, and Relph in 1979. Both studied at Kingston University, London. Payne failed his undergraduate Intermedia course in 2000, and Relph was "booted out" the same year. Curator and critic Matthew Higgs promoted their work and included them in group exhibitions at the Serpentine Gallery (2000) and the Institute of Contemporary Arts (2001) in London. Since then, they have had solo exhibitions in national museums including the National Museum of Contemporary Art, Oslo (2004) and the Serpentine Gallery (2005). According to Artforum, they are "the unanimously hailed first new kids of the post-YBA moment."

== Career ==
They make pseudo-documentaries, influenced by the work of Patrick Keiller. Driftwood (1999) has as its subject skateboarders, House & Garage (2000) is loosely organized around the subject of musical subcultures and Jungle (2001) explores England's farmland.

They have had solo shows at the Serpentine Gallery (2005), London, Gavin Brown's Enterprise, New York (2005), Kunsthalle, Zürich (2004), National Museum of Contemporary Art, Oslo (2004), and the Knoxville Museum of Art (2003). In 2002 they were shortlisted for the Beck's Futures prize and have been included in both the 2003 and 2006 Tate Triennials.

They won the Golden Lion award for best artists under 35 at the 2003 Venice Biennale.

Their works are held in the collections of the Tate Gallery.
