= Martin Wilson (artist) =

Australian artist

Martin Wilson is a visual artist, based in Newcastle, New South Wales, Australia.

== Early life and education ==
Martin Wilson graduated from the National Art School in Sydney in 1994.

== Art practice ==
Wilson works primarily in painting and textile media.

Among his most prominent works is The Fuzzy Prime Ministers – a series of latch-hook rug portraits of each Prime Minister of Australia. The series was created to mark Australia's Centenary of Federation in 2001 and was exhibited at Object Gallery in Sydney during the Sydney Festival, the National Portrait Gallery (Australia) in Canberra and regional art galleries throughout Australia. Following his election in November 2007, a portrait of Kevin Rudd – the 26th in the series – was first shown at the Flinders Street Gallery in Sydney.

Wilson's other major works include Blue Budgie on Pink (2003) and Raw Prawn (2007).

In April 2009 at the University of Newcastle Gallery, Martin presented Post (2009), a series of rug portraits of Australia Post workers for the Making Our Times exhibition, which he also co-curated with Jason Martin of the Flinders Street Gallery.

Wilson has exhibited extensively in artist-run spaces in Newcastle, Melbourne, and Brisbane, and was co-founder and co-director of Newcastle artist-run space Rocketart from 1999 to 2004.
