= Sadotti =

Sadotti is a surname. Notable people with the surname include:

- Giorgio Sadotti (born 1955), British conceptual artist
- Mirco Sadotti (born 1975), Italian footballer
