= Very Up & Co =

Contemporary art gallery

VERY UP & CO (= Uscha Pohl and Company) is a cross cultural art space in New York City that describes itself as covering "art, fashion, design and ecology" and stages exhibitions and events in London, New York City, Düsseldorf, Mallorca and Paris.

It was founded in 1996 in TriBeCa, Lower Manhattan, New York, by artist, designer, curator and German expat Uscha Pohl, who is the present director.

In September 1997, VERY UP & CO launched the international art magazine VERY, edited by Uscha Pohl.

In 2004, the gallery opened its branch in London.

Exhibited artists include Damien Hirst, Tracey Emin, Jeremy Deller, Cees Krijnen, Juan Manuel Echavarria, Lara Schnitger, Judith Eisler, Devon Dikeou, Mia Enell, Mark Dagley, Samantha McEwen, Monica Castiglioni

== Sources ==
- Tom Moody, Op at Up, Up & Co, NY, May 16-July 18, 1998
- Artnet, with Uscha Pohl‘s Changing Room-ID Cell, 1999
- Die Zeit online, It and Out, New Yorker Notizen, 1999
- MoMa PS1, Criss Cross: SomeYoung New Yorkers !II February 7-April 3, 1999
- Zingmagazine, issue 4, Uscha Pohl and Ellen Cantor
- Michelle Lowe-Holder, Uscha Pohl and VERY, November 9, 2011
