= Not-for-profit arts organization =

A not-for-profit arts organization, also known as a nonprofit arts organization, usually takes the form of a not-for-profit organization, nonprofit organization, association, or foundation. Such organizations are formed for the purpose of developing and promoting the work of artists in various visual- and performing-art forms such as film, sculpture, dance, painting, multimedia, poetry, and performance art.

== History ==
Although museums and performing-arts societies have existed for centuries, they have proliferated since the end of World War II. In particular, government-sponsored organisations such as the Arts Council of Great Britain, the Canada Council, the New York State Council on the Arts and the National Endowment for the Arts, have been created to fund award grants to help promote the development of art and culture.

Not-for-profit legal service organizations provide services to artists and arts and cultural organizations. Philadelphia Volunteer Lawyers for the Arts (PVLA) is one such organization. Through its volunteer attorneys PVLA provides non-criminal legal assistance to artists and arts and cultural organizations on arts related issues.

== Canadian artist-run centres ==
In Canada, a series of artist-run organizations often known as "parallel galleries" or artist-run centres (ARCs) have developed in cities across the country since the 1960s to encourage the exhibition of contemporary works by Canadian and international artists. The purpose is often to provide alternative spaces for exhibition for emerging artists and contemporary artists outside the commercial-gallery system. Canadian ARCs usually pay a fee and de-emphasize the selling of work, although this will vary from gallery to gallery. A recommended schedule of payment is provided by the Canadian Artists' Representation (CARFAC), an artists'-advocacy group.

== Not-for-profits versus nonprofits in the United States ==
In the United States, not-for-profit organizations are defined separately from nonprofit organizations. Not-for-profits are groups that do not have salaried positions and are often collectives or social groups. Whereas nonprofits are organizations run by salaried employees and often volunteer boards with a community mission. These organizations operate like a business but have different tax identification and are supported additionally by grants. A museum is an example of a nonprofit, whereas an artists' collective may be an example of a not-for-profit.

== See also ==
- Anime club
- Artist cooperative
- Artist-run initiative
- Artist-run space
- Arts centre
- Association without lucrative purpose
- Canadian artist-run centres
- Community arts
