= Julie Umerle =

American-born abstract painter

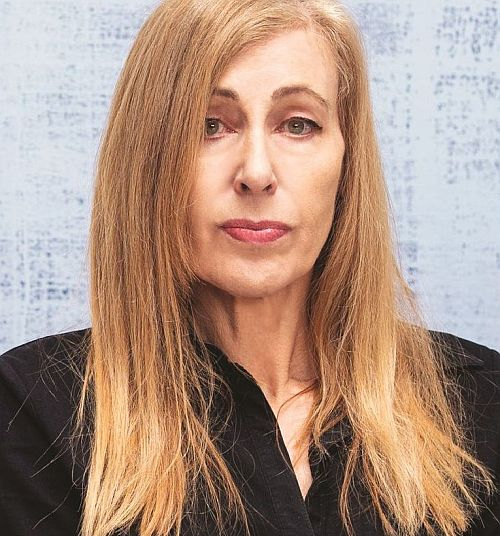
- Julie Umerle
- Born: Julie Umerle; Connecticut, United States
- Education: Falmouth University; Parsons School of Design
- Known for: Painting
- Website: www.julieumerle.com

Julie Umerle is an American-born abstract painter who lives and works in London.

== Biography ==
Umerle was born in Connecticut USA and relocated to London with her family as a young child.

She studied French Literature at the University of Sussex and fine art at Falmouth University where she was awarded a First class Hons degree. From 1991 - 1996, Umerle worked as an artist educator at a number of London galleries including The Whitechapel Gallery, The Barbican Centre, The Hayward Gallery and The Royal Academy. She graduated from Parsons School of Design with a MFA in 1998, having worked as a teaching assistant there in her final year. She lived and worked between London and New York for a further five years after completing her studies, before returning to the UK and settling again in London in 2003.

In 2019, her memoir Art, Life and Everything was published to critical acclaim. The book describes the early years of her career as an artist in London and New York, and has a foreword written by Colin Thubron.

== Exhibitions ==
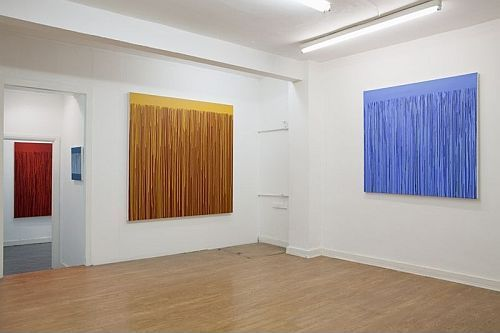
Julie Umerle. Installation view of the exhibition 'Cosmos or Chaos' at studio1.1, London. 2010

Julie Umerle. Eclipse, 2000. 20 x 18 inches. Oil and acrylic on canvas

Umerle has exhibited widely in London and the UK in solo and group exhibitions, and also internationally including the USA, China, France, Poland and Germany.

In 1980, Umerle held a solo exhibition of her work at Frestonia's Car Breaker Gallery in London, a squat in Ladbroke Grove's Republic of Frestonia, followed a few years later by 'Ten Years of Painting' at The Barbican Arts Centre.

Herbert Art Gallery and Museum hosted Umerle's first UK solo museum exhibition in 1995 including works such as Paragon, Flock and Wrap.

Group exhibitions include shows at Royal Academy of Arts, Flowers Gallery, Maidstone Museum & Art Gallery, Huddersfield Art Gallery, Jiangsu Art Gallery, National Museum, Gdansk, Metro Pictures Gallery, A.I.R. Gallery and Artists Space.

Solo exhibitions include 'Recent Paintings' at Bermondsey Project Space, London (2021), 'Rewind' at Bermondsey Project Space, London (2016) and 'Cosmos or Chaos' at studio1.1, London (2010).

In 2019 she was published in Aesthetica Magazine's '100 Contemporary Artists 2019' printed Anthology.

== Work ==
Umerle paints in series that are open-ended, exploring similarity, repetition and difference within each group of work, making work that explores the materiality of paint and the processes of abstract painting. Her practice is an investigation of materials and the perception of the image. Engaged in a process that explores the act of painting itself, she works on a variety of supports.

In 2011, American art critic and painter Jason Stopa, writing for NY Arts magazine, observed that "Umerle arrives at her imagery via a hyper formalism that makes no distinction between medium, surface, and support". Her paintings "exist at the meeting point of decision and accident", making the viewer aware of the trail of the brush, the pressure of the artist's hand and the degree to which one mark can differ under varying circumstances, setting up conditions for chance and responding to the natural physicality of paint itself.

Of her work, British artist and art historian Simon Morley has written: "Her paintings evoke a feeling of suspension, as if what we see is a held or frozen moment within an ongoing process. This sense of simplicity is achieved through an enormous process of condensation, resulting in a level of clarity and unity that permeates the work."

In 2022, Artnet described her series of geometric paintings as: "a formidable synthesis of the rich traditions of color field painting and geometric abstraction. Her subtle and meticulous canvases in many ways operate as investigations into the myriad of ways color, shape, and scale interact, both within a single composition as well as across series."

Her paintings are held in public and private collections including The Deutsche Bank Collection, The Connaught, Pinsent Masons, Swindon Art Gallery and The Priseman Seabrook Collection.

Complementary material is held at Tate Library and Archive and The Women's Art Library, Goldsmiths University.

== Awards and recognition ==
In 2025, Julie Umerle was a winner in the i-D x Ray-Ban RED global art competition, a partnership between the magazine and brand that celebrated global artists, with her painting Octagon (Red) being featured in i-D magazine.

Umerle has received numerous awards and grants for her work, including the Greater London Arts Association award (1983 and 1988); five awards from Arts Council England (2005, 2007, 2008, 2015 and 2021); an award from the Adolph and Esther Gottlieb Foundation (2001); and an award from London Arts Board (1996).

== Publications ==
- Art, Life and Everything: A memoir, 2019. ISBN 9781527242166
