= Post-YBAs =

Generation of British artists

Post-YBAs refers to British artists emerging in the 2000s after the Young British Artists. The label has generally been used as a loose critical category rather than as the name of a formal movement or self-declared group.

Post-YBA artists include Martin Maloney. Jeremy Deller, Tim Noble and Sue Webster, Mike Nelson, Carey Young, Eva Rothschild, Darren Almond, David Thorpe, and Oliver Payne and Nick Relph.

According to Matthew Higgs, Simon Starling's winning of the Turner Prize in 2005 reflected a post-YBA sensibility which is more modestly material and formal than spectacle-driven. Enrico David tapped into a post-YBA vogue for craft. The post-YBA generation has also been associated with neo-conceptual art with a political edge.
