= Keith Coventry =

British artist and curator

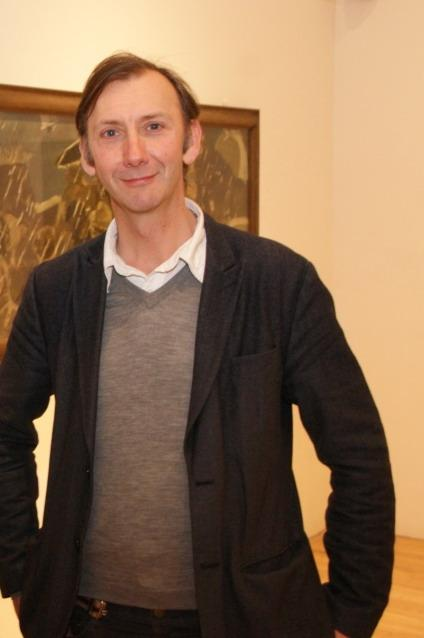
- Keith Coventry at the Lightbox, Woking, Surrey, 2010.
- Born: 12 September 1958 (age 67); Burnley, England, UK

Keith Coventry is a British artist and curator. In September 2010 his Spectrum Jesus painting won the £25,000 John Moores Painting Prize.

Keith Coventry was born in Burnley in 1958 and lives and works in London. He attended Brighton Polytechnic 1978–1981 and Chelsea School of Art London 1981–1982. He was featured in the seminal exhibition Sensation at the Royal Academy of Arts, London, in 1997 and in 2006, he received a mid-career retrospective at Glasgow's Tramway (Art Centre). He was also a co-founder and curator of City Racing, an influential not-for-profit gallery in Kennington, South London from 1988 to 1998.

His work has been exhibited widely in the UK and Europe and is included in collections worldwide, including the British Council; Tate Modern; Arts Council of England; Walker Art Center, Minneapolis;, and The Museum of Modern Art, New York City. In 2010 Coventry was awarded the John Moores Painting Prize.

== Early life ==
Coventry studied Fine Art at Brighton Polytechnic – now the Faculty of Arts (University of Brighton) – from 1978 to 1981 followed by an MA at Chelsea School of Art, graduating in 1982.

Before he could support himself through his art he had a number of jobs, including working as a painter and decorator for the infamous property magnate Nicholas Van Hoogstraten and as a caretaker at a girls' public school in London.

== Career ==
His first solo exhibition was at Karsten Schubert gallery in 1992. Charles Saatchi was an early advocate and collector, featuring Coventry in Young British Artists V (1995) at his gallery on Boundary Road, St John's Wood, London; he was also in the Sensation exhibition, which exposed the Young British Artists (YBAs) to a wider audience when it was staged at the Royal Academy in 1997. In 2006, he received a mid-career retrospective at Glasgow's Tramway (arts centre). Since 2006, he has exhibited in London, Zurich, Berlin, and Seoul.

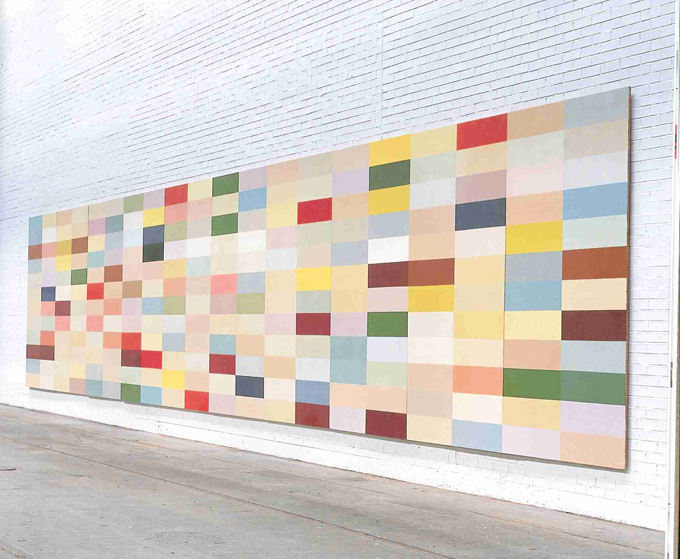
An example of Coventry's work

Coventry's work features in many public collections, including the Tate gallery, London, The Museum of Modern Art (MoMA), New York, and the Museum of Contemporary Art San Diego (MCASD). In 2009, the Arts Council England, with the support of The Art Fund, acquired a large number of works from his 'Crack City Series'.

He was also a co-founder and curator of City Racing, an influential not-for-profit gallery in Kennington which gave artists like Sarah Lucas, Gillian Wearing and Fiona Banner early exposure and was later celebrated in the book, City Racing, The Life and Times of an Artist-run Gallery. The owner of White Cube gallery Jay Joplin, said when interviewed in 1994—

We are indeed fortunate that artists collaborate to put on exhibitions off their own bat – Cubitt Street and City Racing are fantastic examples of a process which works very successfully, I've seen some wonderful shows at both these locations.

Coventry lived for many years at Albany (London), an upmarket apartment block on Piccadilly, London, which inspired his Echoes of Albany, a series of work based on Walter Sickert's Echoes paintings .

== Work ==
Of his work, Coventry said in 2008, "I look at the history of art, and I look at a social issue and I combine them."

Writer and critic Michael Bracewell writes:

In the art of Keith Coventry, the detritus, aggression and excess of postmodern society is expressed through the poised and elegant language of modernism...There is a poetic detachment in his work, expressed through his favouring of workmanlike, un-aesthetic colours which can often appear random, coldly institutional or light industrial. His art conflates the mournful, quotidian sensibility of consumer culture, tribal aggression, prostitution, drugs and bored despair, with both high modernist strategies and geo-political models. The result is a stilled, mausoleum-like evocation of modern amorality and cultural absurdity.

Coventry has also said, "the social issue re-empowers modernism. If you attach [it] to a piece of art history, it becomes alive again."

Andrew Lambirth of The Spectator affirms that:

Coventry paints in a number of very distinct styles, and seems to embody the stylistic plurality so typical of our age. He makes what look like minimalist abstracts inspired by the layout of housing estates; he paints white-on-white abstracts which are actually scenes of typical Englishness, such as the royal family at public functions; he makes sculptures of snapped-off saplings or destroyed park benches from inner-city no-go areas; he paints black-on-black abstracts based on flower-arranging or bright Mediterranean scenes by Dufy; and he reinterprets Sickert in a series of figurative paintings called ‘'Echoes of Albany. Coventry’s variousness, which disconcerts some critics, is deeply appealing.

=== Estate Paintings ===
Coventry's Estate Paintings look like homages to Kasimir Malevich's suprematist paintings, however the simple, geometric shapes, typically rendered in black or dark oxblood reds, are in fact replicas of the maps showing the layout of buildings found outside British public housing estates.

The art writer Matthew Collings writes: "These paintings capture the moment when modernist Utopian dreams – the well-meant belief that peoples' lives would be bettered by living in clean, modern, high rise buildings, with lifts, way up above the street with plenty of fresh air—evaporated. Because instead of being the touted New Jerusalem, homes for heroes, the estates spawned new problems, vandalism, violence, social isolation, drug dealing and addiction, prostitution and racism, recurring themes in Coventry’s work.".

=== White Abstracts ===
Coventry's White Abstracts seem at first glance nothing more than a textured surface. However, on closer inspection images emerge from the whiteness through intricate impasto brushwork. One work from the series depicts the Queen being shown around the Tate gallery by its then director Sir Norman Reid ("Sir Norman Reid Explaining Modern Art to the Queen", 1994). Others have included Sir Winston Churchill, cucumber sandwiches, Trooping the Colour, equine paintings after Alfred Munnings and other icons of old-world Englishness. Richard Dyer writes that the whiteness of these paintings "...drains these potent signifiers of all but their symbolic content, rendering them as empty vessels... the eviscerated écorché of a once vital part of British nationhood, now rendered obsolete by the advance of socialist democracy, global capitalism and the rise of the nouveau riche technocracy."

=== Junk Series ===
In the 'Junk Series' Coventry takes the flattened and crumpled remnants of McDonald's' packaging, as it would be found on the pavements, and crops them in such a way as to transform them into iconic constructivist compositions, rendered in the brand's ubiquitous livery. In an interview with Whitechapel Gallery director Iwona Blazwick in 2008, Coventry said: "I wanted to present them [the Junk Series] as Suprematist-looking objects, using the colours red, yellow and blue. I like this idea that capitalism can consume anything, that McDonalds can consume suprematism. No matter what you do to react against it, it just welcomes it with open arms and says 'let's make some money from it.".

=== Echoes of Albany ===
Coventry's Echoes of Albany explicitly references the British painter Walter Sickert's Echoes series, which were executed in the 1930s and based on Victorian scenes taken from The Illustrated London News. Coventry once resided at Albany (London), an apartment block in Piccadilly that has housed many distinguished artists, amongst them Lord Byron, Bruce Chatwin and the actor Terence Stamp While the works, rendered in muted pinks, white and reds, appear to depict a bygone world through rose-tinted spectacles, Coventry subverts the image, adding voluptuous prostitutes and ruined drug-addicts while exploring the "crossover between society and the sordid".

=== Crack City Series ===
The works in the Crack City Series make use of traditional media—oil on canvas, cast bronze sculpture and engraving—and reference the suprematist abstraction of Malevich, but also Giorgio Morandi's still lifes of the 1920s and 30s of bottles, which he painted repeatedly while locked in his studio as outside Benito Mussolini and the fascists came to power. Says Coventry:

All the big events in the world are happening and [Morandi]'s not commenting on any of them in any way, he was just focussing on the abstract arrangement of bottles. I thought that was analogous to a crack addict who has no interest in events, he's only interested in where the bottle is, the crack pipe in relation to him.

=== Spectrum Jesus Paintings and Repressionism ===
The Repressionism Series came about after Coventry read a book on the infamous art forger Han van Meegeren at the London Library. Van Meegeren had successfully forged and sold on works in the style of Johannes Vermeer, even duping the Nazi Hermann Göring. Coventry then considered how easy it would be to fake a painting himself, choosing the expressionist painter Emil Nolde because he thought his seemingly simple style would be easy to counterfeit. He then took a painting of the head of Christ that Van Meegeren had executed as part of a study for the Dutch artist's take on The Last Supper, a work Vermeer never in fact painted. The Jesus heads (example: right) are executed in a colour spectrum and the frames are the same type used by the German expressionists.

Speaking to Simon Grant, editor of Tate Etc. magazine, Coventry said that what he liked about Van Meegeren's fake Vermeer was its expressionist quality, however

...as I couldn't muster up that kind of spiritual look, I decided against expressionism, to go for an idea that I have called 'repressionism', meaning that, as I worked on each of the canvases, bringing the tones closer together, eventually all the expressiveness of each one would be completely wiped out, leaving little except the texture of the paint.

Coventry added:

As a child I was a Roman Catholic. Every Sunday morning at seven o'clock I had to go to church where I had a few minutes to look at the texts that I had to read for the service. The image of Jesus is like a container for all sorts of ideas. Maybe subconsciously I thought of the Turin Shroud as well, how the image is just barely visible – which itself is meant to be a fake. It's not a natural thing, but yet, I'm neutralising it as an image by making monochromes.

Asked why he moved away from his usual monochrome palette, he said he liked the literal idea of Christ as " am the light" and "the display of these paintings in a row is a way of showing that element". He also expressed an interest in the risk to making religious paintings and thought that if he "did it in monochrome I could get away with painting something that's been done many times before and done so well."

Sir Norman Rosenthal, the former Exhibitions Secretary at the Royal Academy and one of the judges of the John Moores Painting Prize, explains: "Spectrum Jesus explores both the moral and religious aspects of iconography. Full of ambiguity and contradictions, the painting of Jesus Christ follows some of the oldest traditions of icon painting, with the image being repeated throughout the series that the work is part of. The fact that the painting is difficult to see is intentional. The reflections on the glass slow the experience down and allow the work to be absorbed by the viewer."

The Spectrum Jesus painting that won the John Moores Painting Prize was acquired by the Walker Art Gallery, home of the Prize, with a grant from Art Fund.

=== History Paintings ===
The History Paintings are presented in a similar manner to the great historical paintings found in museums, with heavy black frames and hand painted narratives on gold-leafed plaques, and engage with the idea of how bravery can exist on both high and low moral levels. In one diptych, 5th century BC Roman aristocrat Coriolanus single-handedly storms an enemy fortress, while in the accompanying painting a single football hooligan, Harry "The Mad Dog" Trick, an avid Millwall Football Club supporter, attacks an opposing army of Chelsea fans.

Another work shows the epic journey taken by Xenophon and his 10,000 Greek warriors in their campaign against the Persians in 401BC, and compares it to the progress of English football fans marauding through Spain during the 1982 World Cup. Similarly, another is "History Painting (One Horatii Fought and Killed Three Curiatii in the 7th Century B.C. / Steve Ashgate an Arsenal fan fought and defeated three West Ham F.C.F. in Mayday 1992), 1994."

Coventry says that "By juxtaposing the two classes of events in the painting it becomes clear that the power of history is not determined by the quality of the event, but by the power of the narrative. When it's at its most successful history detaches itself from the event and its moral implications and becomes mythology."

=== Other series ===
Kebabs, 1997
Supermodels, 1999–2000;
Key Groups, 2001
Collection Particulière;2007–2008
White Slaves, 2008
Broken Windows, 2008
The Deontological Pictures, 2012

== Selected bibliography ==
- Keith Coventry: Deontological Pictures. Publisher: Ridinghouse, London, 2012. ISBN 978-1-905464-70-8
- Keith Coventry: Vanishing Certainties. Publisher: Haunch of Venison, London, 2009. ISBN 978-1-905620-37-1
- Anaesthesia as Aesthetic. Publisher: Haunch of Venison, London, 2008. ISBN 978-1-905620-23-4
- Keith Coventry; Paintings. Publisher: Tramway, 2007. ISBN 978-1-899551-40-8
- Heroes and Racists. Publisher: Fine Art Society, 2008. ISBN 978-0-905062-50-1

== Interviews ==
- Artinterview – online magazine
- Interview by Simon Todd for Artnet
