= Barbara Rae =

Scottish painter & printmaker (born 1943)

Dame Barbara Rae DBE RA FRSE
- Born: Barbara Davis Rae; 10 December 1943 (age 82); Falkirk, Scotland
- Known for: Painting, printmaking
- Awards: Guthrie Award, 1977
- Website: barbararae.com

Dame Barbara Davis Rae DBE RA FRSE (born 10 December 1943) is a Scottish painter and printmaker. She is a member of the Royal Scottish Academy and the Royal Academy of Arts.

== Biography ==
Rae studied painting at the Edinburgh College of Art from 1961 to 1965. As a student, she worked as a grouse-beater in the Scottish Highlands. "I loved being up there walking the hills, seeing the landscape, drawing it," Rae said in a 2013 interview. "Geography was really important to me and it still plays a huge role in my art." After graduating, Rae received a travel scholarship that allowed her to spend time painting in France and Spain.

That experience and her later travel shaped her art, which largely focuses on landscapes. She exhibited in her first solo show in 1967 at the Edinburgh's New 57 Gallery. During her early career, she taught art at Ainslie Park School in Edinburgh (1968–69), Portobello High School (1969-1972), and the Aberdeen College of Education (1972–74). In 1975, she became a lecturer in drawing and painting at the Glasgow School of Art, where she worked until 1996.

During this time, Rae exhibited regularly and received many awards for her artwork. In 1980, she was elected as an Associate of the Royal Scottish Academy; she became a full member in 1992. In 1983, she was elected president of the Society of Scottish Artists. She was appointed as a member of the Royal Fine Art Commission for Scotland in 1995. Rae also became a member of the Royal Academy of Art in 1996. In 1999, she was awarded a Commander of the Order of the British Empire. She is also a Royal Etcher, a Fellow of the Royal College of Art, and an Honorary Fellow of the Royal Society of Edinburgh.

Rae's work is held by institutions including the University of Edinburgh, University of Glasgow, British Museum, National Museum of Women in the Arts, and Whitworth Art Gallery. The first monograph on her work was in its third printing as of 2013.

Rae has homes in Scotland, Los Angeles, and France and often travels elsewhere in Europe and the southwest United States. She is married to Gareth Wardell.

== Style ==
Broadhaven by Barbara Rae

The Royal Academy of Arts' magazine RA has described Rae's works as "intense colour bursts that evoke dramatic landscapes but remain resolutely abstract", "distil[ling] the colour, light and forms of nature into dazzling visions". Rather than mixing paints on a palette, Rae applies unmixed acrylic paints to the canvas itself and then pours fluid over them to blend them. The bright colors of her paintings and prints diverge from the typical colors of Scottish art. Rae has said that she does not regard herself as a Scottish artist, though her "relationship with the landscape and history of the west coast of Scotland" has inspired much of her art.

Rae's travel has greatly influenced her art. Beginning in the 1960s, Rae travelled extensively in Spain, Ireland, France, and the southwest United States. These travels "generated a body of work which indicated a deep interest in the history as well as the aesthetics of landscape". Rae has said of her approach to her subjects, "I'm not interested in topographical detail. I need to be able to immerse myself in the culture of a place to create art."

== Awards and honors ==
- Scottish Arts Council Award (1975)
- Guthrie Medal (Royal Scottish Academy) (1977)
- Scottish Arts Council Award (1981)
- Calouste Gulbenkian Printmaking Award (1983)
- Sir William Gillies Travel Award (Royal Scottish Academy) (1983)
- May Marshall Brown Award (The Royal Scottish Society of Painters in Watercolour) (1983)
- Scottish Arts Council grant (1989)
- Hunting Group Prize (1990)
- Alexander Graham Munro Award (The Royal Scottish Society of Painters in Watercolour)
- Commander of the Order of the British Empire
- Honorary doctorate, Napier University (2002)
- Honorary doctorate, Aberdeen University
- Honorary fellowship, Royal College of Art (2008)
- Honorary doctorate, University of St Andrews
- Elected a Fellow of Royal Society of Edinburgh (2011)

== Solo exhibitions ==
- 1967 - New 57 Gallery, Edinburgh
- 1977 - Gilbert Parr Gallery, London
- 1978 - University of Edinburgh
- 1979 - The Scottish Gallery, Edinburgh
- 1983 - The Scottish Gallery, Edinburgh
- 1985 - Wright Gallery, Dallas, Texas, USA
- 1986 - Leinster Fine Art, London
- 1987 - The Scottish Gallery, London
- 1988 - Glasgow Print Studio
- 1989 - The Scottish Gallery, Edinburgh
- 1990 - Landmarks and Docklands, The Scottish Gallery, London
- 1991 - The Scottish Gallery, London
- 1992 - Perth Museum and Art Gallery
- 1992 - Earth Pattern, William Jackson Gallery, London
- 1993 - New Monotypes and Prints, Glasgow Print Studio
- 1993 - The Reconstructed Landscape, Highland Regional Council, touring the North of Scotland
- 1994 - Jorgensen Fine Art, Dublin
- 1994 - Theatre Andre Dumas, Germain-en-Laye
- 1994 - The Reconstructed Landscape, Harewood House, Leeds
- 1995 - Art First, London
- 1995 - The Scottish Gallery, Edinburgh
- 1996 - Jorgensen Fine Art, Dublin
- 1996 - Art First, London
- 1996 - Waxlander Gallery, Santa Fe, New Mexico, USA
- 1996 - Bohun Gallery, Henley-on-Thames
- 1997 - New Paintings, (The South Africa Series), Art First, London
- 1998 - The Scottish Gallery, Edinburgh
- 1998 - Edinburgh The Festival City, Galleri Galtung, Oslo
- 1999 - The Painted Desert, Art First, London
- 2000 - West, The Scottish Gallery, Edinburgh
- 2001 - Zuma Beach, Art First, London
- 2002 - Paintings from Ireland, Art First, London
- 2003 - Travelog, Glasgow Print Studio
- 2003 - an-tiarthar – the West, The Scottish Gallery, Edinburgh
- 2004 - Print Exhibition, North House Gallery, Essex
- 2004 - New Paintings, The Tom Caldwell Gallery, Belfast
- 2005 - Barbara Rae Monotypes, The Scottish Gallery
- 2005 - Print Exhibition, North House Gallery, Essex
- 2005 - New Paintings, Adam Gallery, London & Bath
- 2006 - Sierra - New Paintings from Spain, The Scottish Gallery, Edinburgh
- 2008 - New Paintings, Adam Gallery, London & Bath
- 2009 - Vignettes from Ireland, Adam Gallery, London
- 2009 - Recent Paintings, Richmond Hill Gallery, London
- 2010 - Barbara Rae RA: Prints, Sir Hugh Casson Room, Royal Academy, London
- 2010 - Celtic Connections Adam Gallery, London
- 2014 - University of St Andrews, Glasgow
- 2016 - Portland Gallery, London
- 2018 - Barbara Rae: The Northwest Passage - The Royal Scottish Academy of Art and Architecture
- 2018 - Barbara Rae: The Northwest Passage with Inuit sculpture from the Belle Shenkman Collection - Canada Gallery, Canada House, London
