= Alan Kane (artist) =

English artist

- Born: 1961 (age 64–65); Nottingham, England, UK
- Movement: Post-YBAs

Alan Kane (born 1961) is an English artist. Much of Kane's work highlights and celebrates everyday culture and creativity, often exploring collections and collectors.

== Work ==
Alan Kane has produced a number of works in collaboration with Jeremy Deller such as the Folk Archive, 2005, a collection and documentation of contemporary popular art from across the United Kingdom in the form of an exhibition and accompanying catalogue, and Souped Up Tea Urn & Teapot (Dartford 2004), 2004, which consists of a teapot and tea run the type of which are commonly found in village halls given a flamed paint effect as found commonly on Harley Davisons and is part of the Tate Collection.

In 2008 he produced The Stratford Hoard, a commission for Transport for London that consisted of a series of exhibitions celebrating residents living locally to Stratford train Station's collections including postcards, sugar sachets, football boots, masking tape, wind-up toys, electric guitars and Beatles memorabilia.

In 2009 Kane was commissioned by Artangel to produce Life Class, a series of life-drawing classes which aired on Channel 4 and were hosted by John Berger, Judy Purbeck, Maggi Hambling, Gary Hume and Humphrey Ocean.

In 2011 Kane developed Home for Orphaned Dishes as the Children's Commission for Whitechapel Gallery, which displayed a collection of studio pottery as a counterpoint to contemporary slick mass-produced design. The work was purchased by the British Council for their collection.

In 2017 he created Home for Christmas, a large scale commission installed on the front of Tate Britain that used off-the-shelf Christmas decorations to transform the facade.

== Exhibitions ==
Kane featured in the British Art Show 8 that took place at Leeds Art Gallery, Scottish National Gallery of Modern Art, Norwich Castle Museum and Art Gallery and Southampton City Art Gallery from 2015 to 2017. He contributed But., a series of benches constructed from gravestones mounted on top of welded and powder-coated frames, and in Norwich arranged for a team of six carts pulled by Shire horses to deliver the artworks to the venues as a celebration and procession.

In 2019 Kane organised 4 Bed Detached Home of Metal, an exhibition at The New Art Gallery Walsall as part of Home of Metal, a celebration of Heavy Metal's birth in Birmingham. The exhibition included a series of domestic displays celebrating fans of Heavy Metal, along with the metal lounge that showed works by artists including Jeremy Deller, Una Hamilton Helle, Des Hughes, Jim Lambie, Sarah Lucas, Jessica Mallock, Mike Nelson, Simon Periton, David Shrigley, Mark Titchner, Hayley Tompkins, Cathy Ward and Eric Wright & Charlie Woolley as well as Alan Kane himself. The works all had a Metal or metal connection and were of a domestic bent.
