= Cees Krijnen =

Dutch artist

Cornelis Hendrik "Cees" Krijnen (born 29 May 1969 in Velsen) is a Dutch artist.

Krijnen studied at the Gerrit Rietveld Academy and the post-academic education DasArts, both in Amsterdam, Netherlands. In 1999 he won the Dutch art prize Prix de Rome in the discipline Theatre/Visual Arts, with a reality project named Financing my Parents Divorce. This resulted in the Woman in Divorce Battle on Tour, with exhibitions and performances in New York, London, Paris, Luzern, Milan, Montreal (La Biennale de Montreal) and other cities. For this, he cooperated with, amongst others, the Italian design house Pininfarina, the British department store chain Selfridges, the Fondation Cartier pour l'Art Contemporain and the Italian artist Michelangelo Pistoletto. Krijnen is also active as a theatre actor. His latest international art project in 2012 was called The Ultimate Selfportrait.

Krijnen lives in the city of Haarlem and is internationally represented by the gallery Reuten Galerie in Amsterdam, studio1.1 in London and the gallery Very Up & Co in New York.

One of his art projects was around Kenau Simonsdochter Hasselaer, a legendary brave female folk hero in the history of the town.

In 2015, Cees participated with two photographic works in the exhibition O Muse! in De Hallen, the annex for modern art of the Frans Hals Museum in Haarlem.

In 2018 appears an autobiography and a graphic novel on his life and works as artist.

== Publications ==
- G/Blok (2003)
- Krijnen vs Rembrandt (2005)
- TH.EVERYTHING (2011)
- Het Ultieme Zelfportret (2012)
- TH.EVERYTHING #2 (2016)

== Sources ==
- Press Release Pininfarina, 20 March 2002
- La Repubblica, 20 April 2002 Ecco Big: un mese di arti visive, letteratura, musica, gastronomia. E naturalmente, provocazioni
- The Guardian, 22 April 2003 The art of divorce, Dutch-style
- De Hallen: Divorcée est arrivé November 2003
- de Volkskrant, 29 May 2004 Show Krijnen overtreft Patty’s Posse
- Frieze Cees Krijnen June-August 2004
- The Ultimate Selfportrait October 2012
- O MUSE! - De Hallen Haarlem Summer Series 2015
