= 57 Gallery =

Former art gallery in Edinburgh, Scotland

Coordinates: 55°57′05″N 3°11′22″W

The 57 Gallery, later the New 57 Gallery, was an artist-run gallery in Edinburgh, Scotland, from 1957 until 1984.

== History ==
The gallery was founded by a group of painters, with artist Daphne Dyce Sharp turning her studio at 53 George Street into an exhibition space. The gallery was based at Rose Street from 1961 to 1974. From 1974 it was based at 29 Market Street, occupying the upper floor (while Scottish Arts Council led Fruitmarket Gallery occupied the lower floor). Alexander Moffat was Chairman of the Gallery from 1968 until 1978. Gareth Fisher followed him as Chairman.

Among others, the gallery showed the work of Douglas Abercrombie, John Bellany, Barry Flanagan, Alan Gouk, John Houston, John Kirkwood, Eileen Lawrence, Anthea Lewis, William MacLean, Ian MacLeod, Jock McFadyen, James McGlade, John Mooney, and Barbara Rae.

In 1984, the Gallery merged with the Fruitmarket Gallery, which came to occupy the whole of the building under the directorship of Mark Francis. Dissenters to this merger went on to form Collective in 1984, 'on the basis of the original ’57 constitution', as academic Neil Mulholland has written.

The archives of the 57 and New 57 Gallery are held at the National Galleries of Scotland.

== Influence ==
University of Edinburgh scholar, Dr. Neil Mulholland, describes succinctly the history and influence of New 57:

'One of the most significant galleries in mid 20th century Scotland had emerged a decade prior to SAC: the 57 Gallery... 57 Gallery’s constitution established a highly influential model of having an unpaid committee of six who were able to serve no more than two years as directors. They formed a committee for the contemporary visual arts and supported lay members of their organisation, who all paid a small fee to cover the ARI’s [Artist-run Initiative] running costs. They were accountable to the collective’s members. To avoid conflicts of interest, the directors could not exhibit or promote their own work. This model has been copied across Scotland by Collective (Edinburgh), Transmission (Glasgow), Generator (Dundee), Embassy (Edinburgh), and it has spread to Catalyst (Belfast) and 126 (Galway) in Ireland. It is, by now, such an established form of collective artistic endeavour that we may call it a DIY doxa.'

Duncan Macmillan noted the pioneering spirit of the 57 Gallery 'whose foundation reflected the emergence of the small one artist exhibition as the most satisfactory means by which an artist could present him or herself to the public.' Macmillan noted too, that despite its successes the 57 Gallery faced problems: 'A voluntary organisation, on the scale to which any art association is naturally limited, cannot usually afford the time and money to pursue on an effective scale any activity that goes beyond the immediate interests of its members. [...] Nobody who is working effectively as a full-time artist, also has the time to spare to run an artists' association.'
