= Tim Noble and Sue Webster =

British artist duo

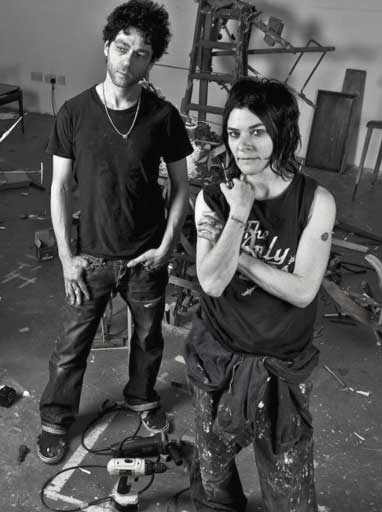
- Tim Noble and Sue Webster in their studio, London, UK
- Born: Tim Noble: 1966; Sue Webster: 1967
- Years active: 1990s–2020, as a collaborative duo
- Known for: Shadow sculptures, light sculptures, installation art, neon works
- Notable work: Dirty White Trash (with Gulls) (1998); The New Barbarians (1997–1999); The Undesirables (2000); Scarlett (2006); Electric Fountain (2008)
- Movement: Post-YBAs
- Website: timnobleandsuewebster.com

Tim Noble and Sue Webster are British artists who worked as a collaborative duo from the 1990s until 2020. Their practice included sculptural installations using discarded materials, light, shadow and neon. Their works include Dirty White Trash (with Gulls), The New Barbarians and Electric Fountain. Their work has been exhibited at institutions including MoMA PS1 and is represented in collections including the National Portrait Gallery and the Guggenheim.

== Early lives and careers ==
Noble and Webster attended fine art foundation courses at Cheltenham Art College (now the University of Gloucestershire) and Leicester Polytechnic (now De Montfort University) respectively. The two first met in 1986 as Fine Art students at Nottingham Trent University, became good friends through shared interests, particularly their tastes in music.

Their work features in a number of public collections, including the National Portrait Gallery, London, the Arken Museum of Modern Art, Denmark and the Solomon R. Guggenheim Museum, New York.

In 2007, they were awarded the Arken Prize,and in 2009 they received Honorary Doctorates of Art from Nottingham Trent University, their former college, in acknowledgement of their artistic achievements to date.

== Work ==
Noble and Webster developed a collaborative practice across sculpture, installation and light-based work. Their major bodies of work include shadow sculptures made from discarded or accumulated objects, and light sculptures using neon, bulbs and LEDs. In its 2003 survey of their work, MoMA PS1 described the artists as exploring the “toxic influences of consumer culture” through new forms of portraiture, transforming garbage into sculptural installations and using self-portraiture to question conventional ideas of artistic authorship. The Museum of Fine Arts, Boston describes “bright lights, piles of rubbish, and shadowy figures” as primary elements of their practice, and characterises the work as integrating “satire and punk strategies with the study of modern sculpture and a keen awareness of the self-importance of the London art scene”.

=== Shadow sculptures ===
Noble and Webster's shadow sculptures are made from assemblages of materials such as rubbish, scrap metal, taxidermy and other found objects. When lit from a fixed angle, the assemblages project figurative shadows, frequently in the form of self-portraits.

Their first shadow sculpture, Miss Understood and Mr Meanor (1997), was made from trash and personal objects and projected the artists' profiles onto the wall. The work was acquired by Charles Saatchi and was later destroyed in the 2004 Momart warehouse fire.

Dirty White Trash (with Gulls) (1998) was made from six months of the artists' discarded rubbish and two taxidermy seagulls. MoMA PS1 described the work as a sculptural mass lit by a slide projector to cast a double self-portrait of the artists.

The Undesirables (2000) was an installation made from trash, an electric fan, three light projectors, coloured gels and a smoke machine. The work was shown in Apocalypse: Beauty and Horror in Contemporary Art at the Royal Academy of Arts, London, in 2000.

The artists continued to use the shadow technique in later works including British Wildlife (2000), Real Life is Rubbish (2002), and Black Narcissus (2006). In Black Narcissus, exhibited at the Freud Museum in London as part of Polymorphous Perverse, a sculpture installed in Freud's study cast a double profile of the artists when illuminated.

=== Light sculptures ===
Noble and Webster's light sculptures use neon, LEDs and sequenced bulbs. Critics have compared them to commercial signage, fairground lighting, British seaside illuminations, Las Vegas and Times Square. An early example, Toxic Schizophrenia (1997), is a flashing light sculpture in the form of a heart pierced by a knife; Frieze described the work as a grid of coloured bulbs that fills and empty itself with blood.

In 2001 the artists made several works based on illuminated sign forms. Dollar Sign and Forever (both 2001) were included in MoMA PS1's 2003–04 survey of their work; the museum described Dollar Sign as a bright emblem of consumer culture and Forever as a nearly 20-foot neon work whose flickering lights complicated the word's suggestion of permanence.

Sacrificial Heart, exhibited at Gagosian's Davies Street gallery in London in 2007–08, returned to the heart-and-dagger motif of Toxic Schizophrenia.. Critic Charles Darwent described it as a rotating fibreglass heart with flashing coloured lights and a dagger through it, linking the sculpture to Christian iconography, biker tattoos and commercial display. A later public version of the heart motif, Toxic Schizophrenia / Hyper Version (2007), was commissioned for the Museum of Contemporary Art Denver and unveiled in 2009; it was the artists' first permanent public sculpture.

In 2007 Noble and Webster created DIG!!! LAZARUS DIG!!!, an eight-foot-square light sculpture made with more than 750 light bulbs, for Nick Cave and the Bad Seeds’ Dig, Lazarus, Dig!!! project. The work was used as the album artwork, linking the duo’s flashing-sign light works with Cave’s reworking of the Lazarus story.

In February 2008 Noble and Webster installed Electric Fountain at Rockefeller Plaza, New York. The public artwork was a monumental outdoor light sculpture, about 35 feet high, made from steel, 3,390 LED bulbs and 527 metres of neon tubing; its programmed lights were designed to imitate the streaming and cascading movement of water.

=== Other works ===
Noble and Webster's other works include the figurative self-portrait sculptures The New Barbarians (1997–1999) and Masters of the Universe (1998–2000). The New Barbarians was first shown in 1999 at the Chisenhale Gallery, London, and presents the pair as life-size, hairless figures resembling primate ancestors. Masters of the Universe was a related, hair-covered version of the work; it was made from translucent resin, fibreglass, plastic and human hair.

Their 2006 Freud Museum exhibition Polymorphous Perverse centred on Scarlett, a kinetic installation using the artists' studio workbench, modified toys and machine parts, installed in Anna Freud's room. The work was recreated at Deitch Projects, New York, in 2008; critic Robert Shuster described it as a table-based installation of mechanised sexual and violent vignettes.

=== The Dirty House ===
In the early 2000s, Noble and Webster commissioned architect David Adjaye to design a studio in London’s East End, converting a dilapidated early twentieth-century furniture factory into what became known as The Dirty House. Sudjic wrote that the name, given by Adjaye, referred to the artists’ use of rubbish and discarded materials in works such as Dirty White Trash (with Gulls). The New Yorker described the Shoreditch building as having mirror-glass windows and a rough-textured bitumen-painted exterior.

== Personal lives ==
Noble and Webster were married in 2008 and split in 2013 after 20 years together. The Guardian reported that the pair had divorced in 2018 and ended their professional collaboration in 2020.

== Selected bibliography ==
- Tim Noble; Sue Webster; Larry Johnson (1 August 2002). Tim Noble & Sue Webster: Instant Gratification. ISBN 978-1-880154-64-9.
- Tim Noble; Sue Webster; Mark Fletcher (2005). The Joy of Sex. Kukje Gallery. ISBN 978-89-955477-4-8.
- Tim Noble; Sue Webster (5 December 2006). Wasted Youth. Rizzoli. ISBN 978-0-8478-2816-6.
- Tim Noble; Sue Webster (1 April 2008). Polymorphous Perverse. Harry N. Abrams. ISBN 978-1-904212-24-9.
- Tim Noble; Sue Webster; Michael Bracewell; Jeffrey Deitch (11 October 2011). British Rubbish. Rizzoli. ISBN 978-0-8478-3694-9.
