= Studio1.1 =

Artist-run space in Shoreditch, East London

Coordinates: 51.5245°N 0.0746°W

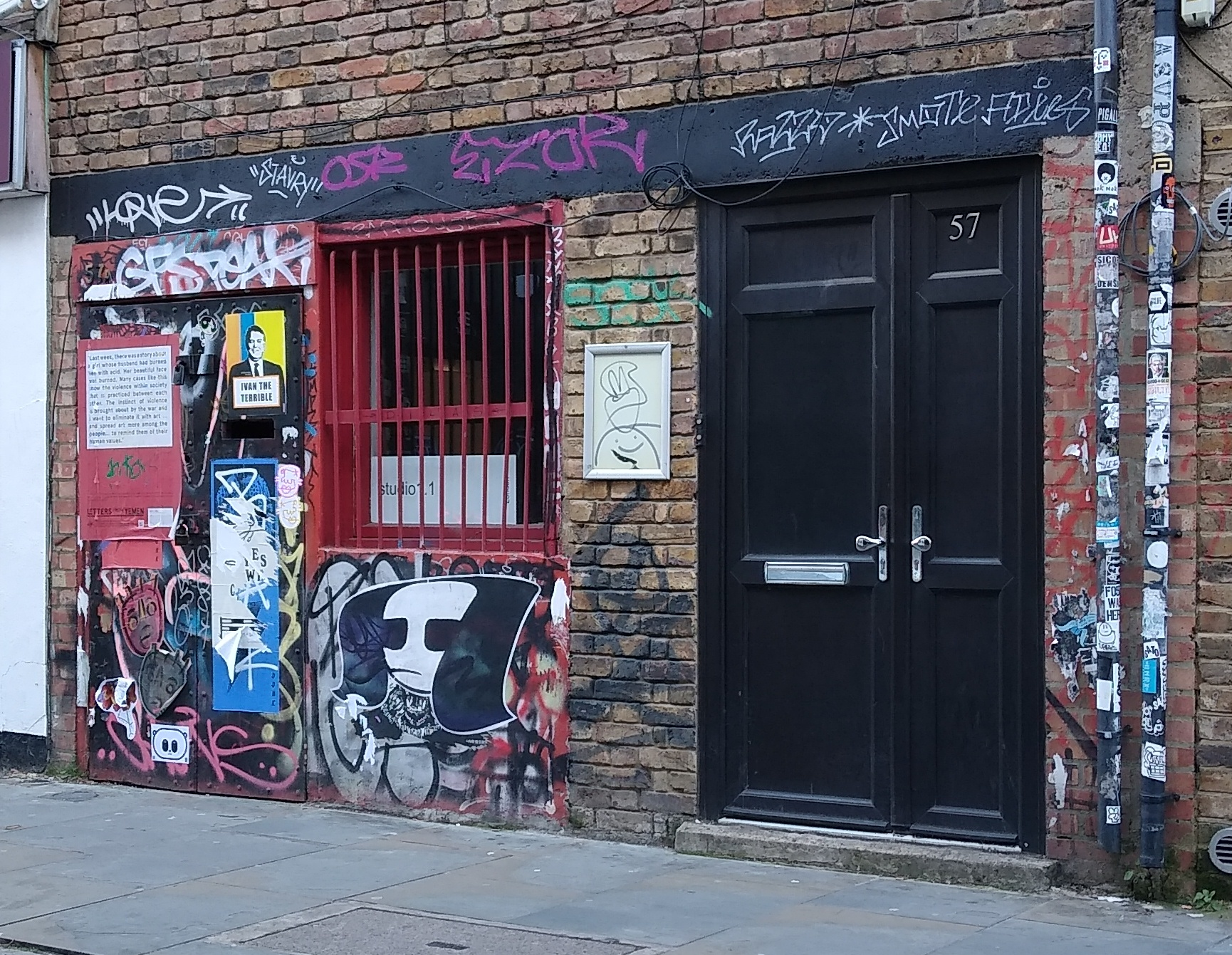
Studio1.1

Studio1.1 is an artist-run space situated in Shoreditch, East London with outpost galleries of Studio1.1 in Brazil (Studio1.3), Croatia (Studio1.4) and the Netherlands (Studio1.2).

== History ==
The gallery was founded in April 2003 as a co-operative by Michael Keenan and Keran James. Honorary patrons are Sacha Craddock and Vanessa Jackson.

Studio1.1 curates off-site shows as well as gallery exhibitions. In 2005, Studio1.1 participated in the Zoo Art Fair at Regent's Park. In 2010, Studio1.1 participated in No Soul for Sale – a Festival of Independents at the Tate Modern Turbine Hall in celebration of Tate Modern's tenth anniversary. In 2011, Studio1.1 exhibited at Sluice Art Fair in London, a satellite event of Frieze Art Fair, which continued in following years. In 2014, Studio1.1 exhibited at Sluice in Brooklyn. In 2025, Studio1.1 hosted "GAZAGAZAGAZA" at the gallery.

Each summer the gallery runs projects at Braziers Park in Oxfordshire in conjunction with Braziers International Artists Workshops during the annual Supernormal Festival, a three-day experimental arts and music festival first held in August 2010.

Studio1.1 exhibits a diverse range of contemporary artists at all stages of their careers, and has shown artists such as Phyllida Barlow, Michelangelo Pistoletto, Cees Krijnen, Julie Umerle, Annie Kevans, Giorgio Sadotti, Charles Williams and Vanessa Jackson.

The gallery hosts a range of discussions, an artist-in-residence programme and a membership scheme. Studio1.1 participates in Time Out First Thursdays each month.

== See also ==
- UK artist-run initiatives
- Artist-run space
