= Giorgio Sadotti =

British artist

Giorgio Sadotti (born 1955 in Manchester, UK) is a conceptual artist based in London.

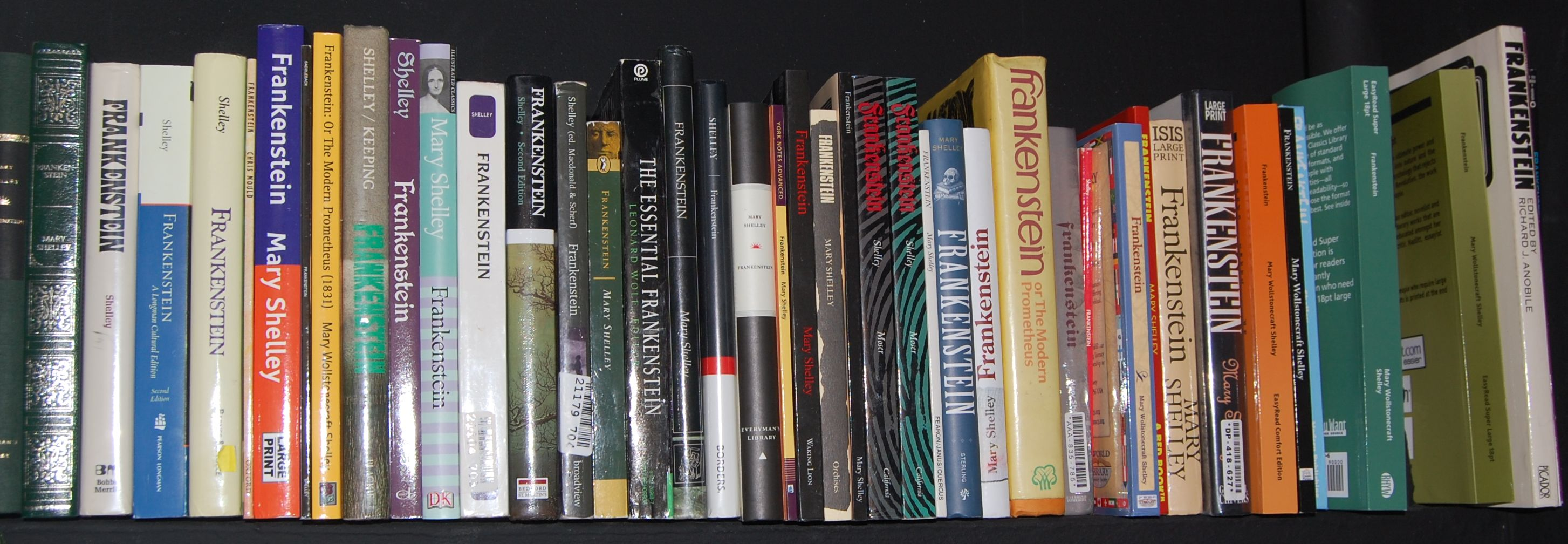
Editions of Mary Shelley's Frankenstein, displayed at Ikon Gallery in Birmingham, England, as part of Sadotti's artwork THIS THIS MONSTER THIS THINGS

In 1993, Sadotti exhibited at City Racing, and in 1996 participated in a group show organised by City Racing at Bricks and Kicks in Vienna run by Muntean and Rosenblum. Other solo exhibitions include the Henry Moore Institute (2006).

His work is held in the collection of the Tate and the British Council Art Collection. In 2003 he won a Paul Hamlyn Award for visual arts.

In December 2012, Sadotti exhibited in a one-person show at studio1.1, east London.
