= Reductive art =

Artistic style using simple materials and minimal details

Reductive art is a term to describe an artistic style or an aesthetic, rather than an art movement. Movements and other terms associated with reductive art include Minimal art, ABC art, anti-illusionism, cool art, rejective art, Bauhaus aesthetic, work that emphasizes clarity, simplification, reduced means, reduction of form, streamlined composition, primary shapes, and restricted color. It is also characterized by the use of plain-spoken materials, precise craftsmanship and intellectual rigor.

== See also ==
- Robert Morris (artist)
- Robert Ryman
- Brice Marden
- Agnes Martin
- Robert Mangold
- Ivo Ringe
- Ellsworth Kelly
- Carmen Herrera
- Michael Fried
