= Samara Halperin =

Samara Halperin is a video and film artist living in the San Francisco Bay Area whose works deal with themes of the queer community, often through stop-motion animation. They use video to combat the lack of queer representation in the media. They have taught video classes at Mills College since 2002. They received a BFA from The Rhode Island School of Design and a Master of Fine arts from California College of the Arts.

== Filmography ==
- 2001: Tumbleweed Town
- 2002: Sorry Brenda
- 2004: Arcade Trade
- 2006: Hard Hat Required
- 2008: The Leather Daddy and the Unicorn

== Awards ==
Goldie Award for outstanding achievements in the arts from The San Francisco Bay Guardian Newspaper 2007
