= Catalyst Arts =

Art gallery in Belfast, Northern Ireland

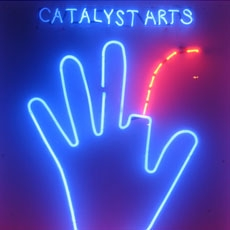

- Location within Northern Ireland
- Established: 1993
- Location: 5 College Ct, Belfast BT1 6BS, United Kingdom
- Coordinates: 54.5983324°N 5.936139°W
- Type: Art Gallery
- Website: www.catalystarts.org.uk

Catalyst Arts a non-profit artist-run space based in Belfast city centre.

== History ==
Catalyst Arts was formed in 1993 in response to what was seen as a cultural vacuum. In accordance with its constitution it is run by unpaid volunteers, and seeks to adopt a poly-vocal strategy towards the promotion of contemporary art practices by large selection of artists and projects from the widest possible range of disciplines. It is modeled after Transmission Gallery, and spawned 126 Artist-run Gallery. Catalyst Arts was envisioned as an agency that would act as a 'catalyst' cajoling, supporting and promoting culturally engaged artistic endeavours on a local, national and international basis Academic and critic, Declan Long describes Catalyst as a "locally influential... collective."

Catalyst Arts was founded on a constitution that provides a structure in which power flows from the roots of its membership to the committee of directors. Catalyst Arts boasts an archive of over 2000 unique documents of Northern Irish art history, which it is currently preparing to make publicly accessible. Catalyst Arts has also organised projects internationally. Catalyst has strong links with the University of Ulster. Catalyst Arts has shown works of David Shrigley, Ross Sinclair, Susan Phillipz, Phil Collins, Michelle D Hannah, Roddy Buchanan, Simon Starling, Bill Drummond to name a few, and has turned the gallery into a sauna with Joanna Karolini. They have also worked on exchanges with 126 in Galway.

== See also ==
Edinburgh's ‘New 57’ Gallery's (1957 – 84)
