= Matthew Higgs =

English artist and curator (born 1964)

Matthew Higgs (born 1964) is an English artist, curator, writer and publisher. His contribution to UK contemporary art has included the creation of Imprint 93, a series of artists’ editions featuring the work of artists such as Martin Creed and Jeremy Deller. During the 1990s he promoted artists outside the Young British Artists mainstream of the period.

== Early life and Imprint 93 ==
Higgs was born in West Yorkshire. He studied Fine Art at Newcastle Polytechnic.(since renamed the University of Northumbria) In 1988, he moved to London and worked for the Grey advertising agency in the media department. In 1993, he founded his own press, Imprint 93, publishing a series of artist's editions and multiples. Participating artists included: Billy Childish, Martin Creed, Chris Ofili, Elizabeth Peyton, Peter Doig and Jeremy Deller. In 1994, Higgs exhibited at EASTinternational which was selected by Jan Dibbets and Rudi Fuchs. The exhibition "Imprint 93/Cabinet Gallery", featuring the work of Martin Creed, was held at Cabinet Gallery in 1994. "Imprint 93/City Racing" was held at City Racing in 1995.

== "British Art Show 5" and "Protest and Survive" ==
In 2000, he curated the "British Art Show 5". This major touring exhibition sought to show that British art embraced a wider range of practices than was indicated by the label "Young British Artists" His exhibition "Protest and Survive" (curated with Paul Noble) at the Whitechapel Art Gallery in 2000 reflected a renewed interest in the art of the 1970s.

In 2001, he described a new aesthetics emerging in British art, pointing to the work of Turner Prize nominees Mike Nelson and Martin Creed. He described these artists as part of a "parallel generation to the YBAs", and bemoaned that younger artists were "still adhering to the YBA orthodoxy promoted by Charles Saatchi".

== Career after 2000 ==
Between 2001 and 2004, he was appointed as a curator at the Wattis Institute for Contemporary Arts at the California College of Arts and Crafts in San Francisco. In 2009 Higgs curated an exhibition of Lucas Samaras' work for Greece's national pavilion at the 53rd Venice Biennale.

As of 2004, Higgs is currently director of White Columns in New York City. In 2006, he was one of the Turner Prize judges, and was interviewed about the judging process by Sarah Thornton in Seven Days in the Art World. In 2007 he selected EASTinternational with Marc Camille Chaimowicz. Higgs is also a member of the New Art Dealers Alliance.

As an artist Higgs had a one-person exhibition, Not Worth Reading, in 2003 at the Wilkinson Gallery in London. It comprised a wide variety of works, from framed book pages to a wall painted in green emulsion. Frieze concluded that the work "ultimately relies on his other practices and interests" and "more often than not reveal unexpected nuances that speak as much of the participatory nature of art as of the impossibility of information and interpretation."

His work is held in the collection of the Tate.

== The Matthew Higgs Society ==
From 2006 to 2010 Harlem art gallery Triple Candie (a duo of art historians, Shelly Bancroft and Peter Nesbett) created a "non-membership-based honor society" focused on the life and work of Higgs. This society claimed to be a "living archive" on his life and art career. The Higgs archive includes writings by and about Higgs, press clippings, reproductions of Higgs' artwork, documentation and ephemera related to exhibitions he has curated, zines, photographs, and other materials.
