= Aideen Barry =

Irish visual artist

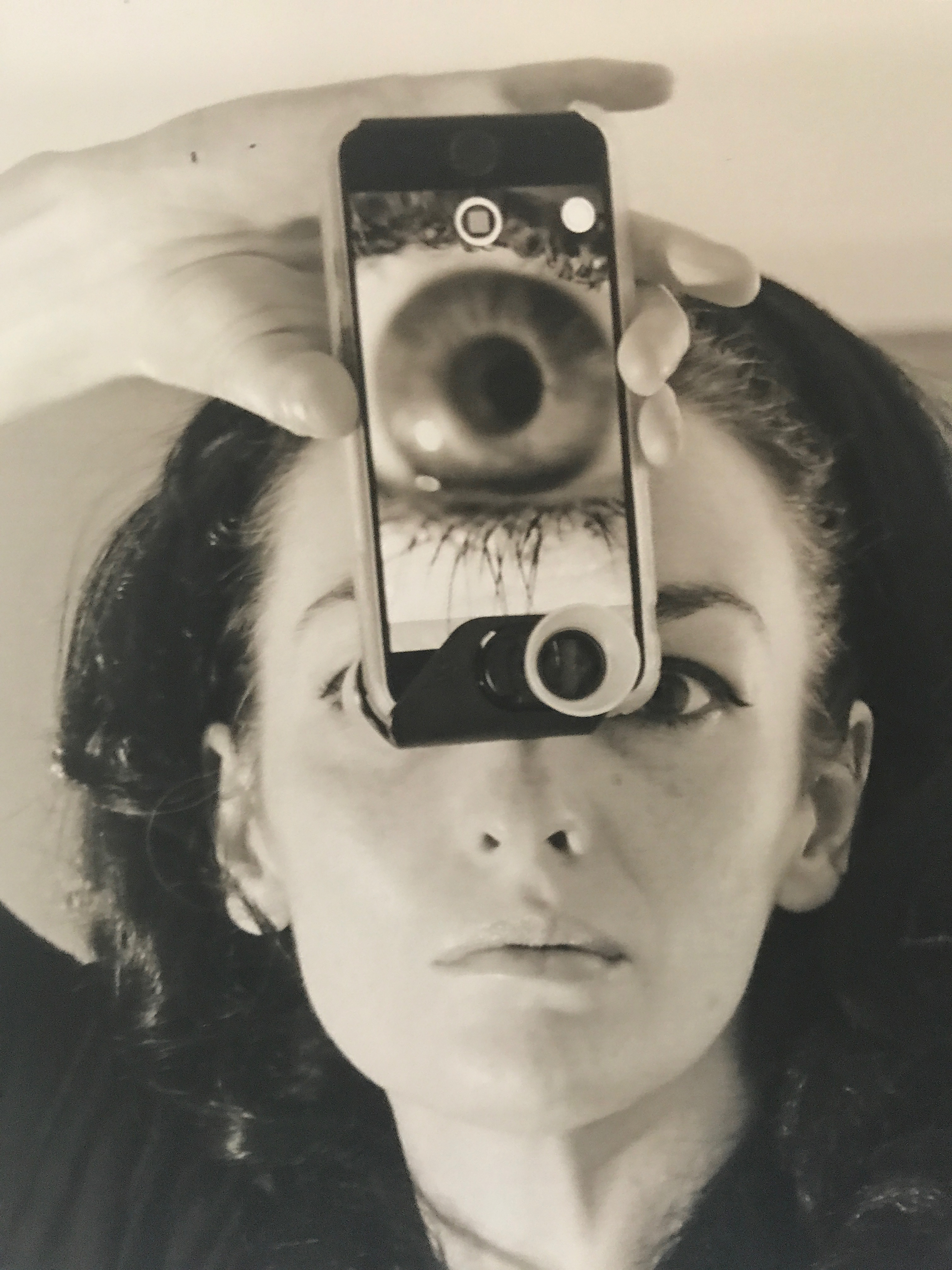
- Born: Aideen Barry; 1979 (age 46–47); Cork, Ireland
- Awards: Aosdána
- Website: www.aideenbarry.com

Aideen Barry is a contemporary visual artist from Cork, Ireland.

== Early life and education ==
Barry was born in Cork in 1979. She studied at Galway Mayo Institute of Technology and Dún Laoghaire Institute of Art, Design and Technology.

== Work ==
Barry works in video, animation, sound, installation, drawing, and performance and often deals with issues of domestic labour.

== Career ==
Barry had an artist residency at the Kennedy Space Center in 2008, "during which she shot a film in zero gravity". Barry's series of polished aluminium sculptures, Weapons of Mass Consumption, was selected by critic Cristín Leach for the broadcaster RTÉ's series of website articles titled 21st Century Ireland in 21 Artworks.

On 21 December 2021, she broadcast a collaborative sound piece on the Irish national television network RTÉ, titled Oblivion / Seachmalltacht / ᖃᐅᔨᒪᔭᐅᔪᓐᓃᖅᑐᑦ (the title consists of words in English, Irish, and an Inuit language called Inuktitut). This was part of a solo exhibition of her work at the Limerick Gallery of Art and commissioned by the Irish Traditional Music Archive.

Barry released a black and white, stop motion film about the history of Kaunas, Lithuania and its architecture, titled Klostes. It debuted as part of the Kaunas 2022 The European Capital of Culture. She designed a postage stamp for An Post in 2022.

Barry teaches at Limerick Institute of Technology. She is a member of Aosdána since 2019 and in 2020 she was elected to the Royal Hibernian Academy as an ARHA. Her work is in the Crawford Art Gallery and the Arts Council of Ireland collections.

== Bibliography ==
- Barry, Aideen, et al. Strange terrain. Dublin: Oonagh Young Gallery, 2014. ISBN 978-0-9549844-2-7
- Fitzpatrick, Mike, and Susan Holland. Noughties but nice : 21st century Irish art. Limerick: Limerick City Gallery of Art, 2009. ISBN 978-0-9553668-9-5
- Long, Declan, and Gavin Murphy. House projects. Dublin: House Projects + Atelier Projects, 2007. ISBN 9780992964108

== See also ==
- Surrealism
- Gothic
