= EASTinternational =

Open submission exhibition in Norwich, England

EASTinternational, often shortened to EAST, was an annual open-submission exhibition selected by invited guests – artists, critics, museum directors and gallerists – that occurred in Norwich University College of the Arts between July and August from 1991 to 2009. Organised by Lynda Morris, devised with artist-educator Manuel Chetcuti, it formed a central part of the Norwich Gallery programme where Morris was curator from 1980–2007. EAST took place in the nineteenth-century art school studios and hallways in the summer months after the degree shows ended, in the Norwich Gallery space, and, occasionally, in off-site public locations around the city of Norwich.

Known initially as EAST National Open Art Exhibition, when it began in 1991 the name alluded to the art school’s regional geographical position in the east of England and, as Morris later recalled, the end of the bipolar western order augured by the fall of the Berlin Wall in 1989 – the opening up of the east.

== Selectors ==
Selectors for each EAST were invited by Lynda Morris (EAST curator) and the EAST steering committee to reflect emerging political, social and artistic trends. The choice of selectors for EASTinternational was an expression of Morris’s social and professional networks. The selectors, in turn, utilised their social and professional networks. Typically, an artist was invited first to select EAST who, in turn, invited someone.

- 1991 Alexander Moffat and Andrew Brighton
- 1992 Helen Chadwick and Marjorie Allthorpe-Guyton
- 1993 David Tremlett and Konrad Fischer
- 1994 Jan Dibbets and Rudi Fuchs
- 1995 Giuseppe Penone and Marian Goodman
- 1996 Richard Long and Roger Ackling
- 1997 Nicholas Logsdail and Tacita Dean
- 1998 Alan Charlton and Michel Durand-Dessert
- 1999 Peter Doig and Roy Arden
- 2000 Keith Piper (artist) and Sebastian Lopez
- 2001 Mary Kelly (artist) and Peter Wollen
- 2002 Lawrence Weiner and Jack Wendler
- 2003 Toby Webster and Eva Rothschild
- 2004 Neo Rauch and Gerd Harry Lybke
- 2005 Gustav Metzger
- 2006 Jeremy Deller and Dirk Snauwaert
- 2007 Matthew Higgs and Marc Camille Chaimowicz
- 2009 Raster Gallery and Art and Language

== EAST award winners ==
An award of £5,000 is given to an artist chosen by the selectors to help develop their work.

- 1991 Alexander Guy
- 1992 Victoria Arney, Naomi Dines
- 1993 Kenny Hunter
- 1994 Stephanie Smith
- 1995 Mary Evans
- 1996 Jacqueline Mesmaeker
- 1997 Tomoko Takahashi
- 1998 Martin McGinn
- 1999 Lucy McKenzie
- 2000 Jananne Al-Ani, Hew Locke
- 2001 Zarina Bhimji
- 2002 Adam Blumberg, Clare Iles, Daniel Milohnic/Dirk Paschke, Hiraki Sawa, Jessica Jackson Hutchins
- 2003 Richard Hughes
- 2004 Justin Mortimer
- 2005 Award shared amongst all artists
- 2006 Jarrett Mitchell, Ruth Ewan
- 2007 Patricia Esquivias

== Critical reception ==
Almost every edition of EAST received critical attention, whether in the art press or regional and mainstream national newspapers. William Feaver, art critic for the Guardian, was an early advocate in 1991, as was Adrian Searle writing on the very last edition in 2009 for the same paper. Aside from sporadic reviews in frieze, A-N Magazine, Third Text or Modern Painters, Art Monthly, the leading chronicle of British art, ran reviews of almost every edition.
