= Tomoko Takahashi =

Japanese artist (born 1966) (died 2025)

- Born: 1966 (age 59–60); Tokyo, Japan
- Education: Tama University; Goldsmiths College; Slade School of Fine Art

Tomoko Takahashi (高橋知子) is a Japanese artist. She was born in Tokyo in 1966, and was based in London from the early 1990s. She studied at Tama Art University, Goldsmiths College and the Slade School of Fine Art.

Takahashi's main medium is installation art, often made of found objects, and is generally site-specific. She studied painting at Tama Art University, however, in around 1994, whilst a student at Goldsmiths she developed an interest in working with found objects.

She first came to attention when she won the EAST award at EASTinternational in 1997 and she has exhibited broadly worldwide since. She has exhibited her work at Beaconsfield, London (1998), the Saatchi Gallery in the 1999 New Neurotic realism exhibition, UCLA's Hammer Gallery (2002–03), the Serpentine Galleries in London, the De La Warr Pavilion (2010). and her work has been collected by the Tate.

In 2000 she was shortlisted for the Turner Prize, along with Glenn Brown, Michael Raedecker, and eventual winner Wolfgang Tillmans.

Takahashi's preferred method for her artistic process, specifically for installation pieces, consists of her inhabiting the space in which the art will be collected. She collects scraps and debris from the site, which she often incorporates into the final product. While these scenes generally incite an idea of chaos, Takahashi's attention to detail is a hallmark of her work. Her first installation of this kind was Company Deal (1997), which utilized the waste of an office space to spill over its walls and furniture. Company Deal was commissioned by an advertising agency in Battersea for their office space.

In addition to installations, Takahashi's work has been sold by the auction houses Sotheby's and Christie's. This work includes installations, but also prints, mixed media wall art, and a series of "An Occasional Table."
