= Sluice Art Fair =

British biennial contemporary art fair

Sluice Art Fair (also known as Sluice or stylized as Sluice__) is a London-based biennial contemporary art fair open to alternative galleries and art organisations run by artists and curators.

== History ==
Sluice Art Fair was founded by artist Karl England and art historian Ben Street in 2011 with the first iteration of the fair taking place in Mayfair at the same week as the Frieze Art Fair. Galleries included Transition Gallery, Fordham and Studio1.1. In 2013, the art fair moved to Bermondsey opposite White Cube and expanded to incorporate galleries from Cardiff, Manchester, Birmingham, Liverpool, Bristol, Southampton, Athens, Barcelona, and Brooklyn, New York. The third iteration of the London-based fair, Sluice__2015, will take place in London's Oxo Tower.

In 2014, Sluice collaborated with collaboration Centotto & Theodore:Art on the Exchange Rates international expo in Brooklyn, New York.
