= Artist-run space =

Organization initiated and run by artists

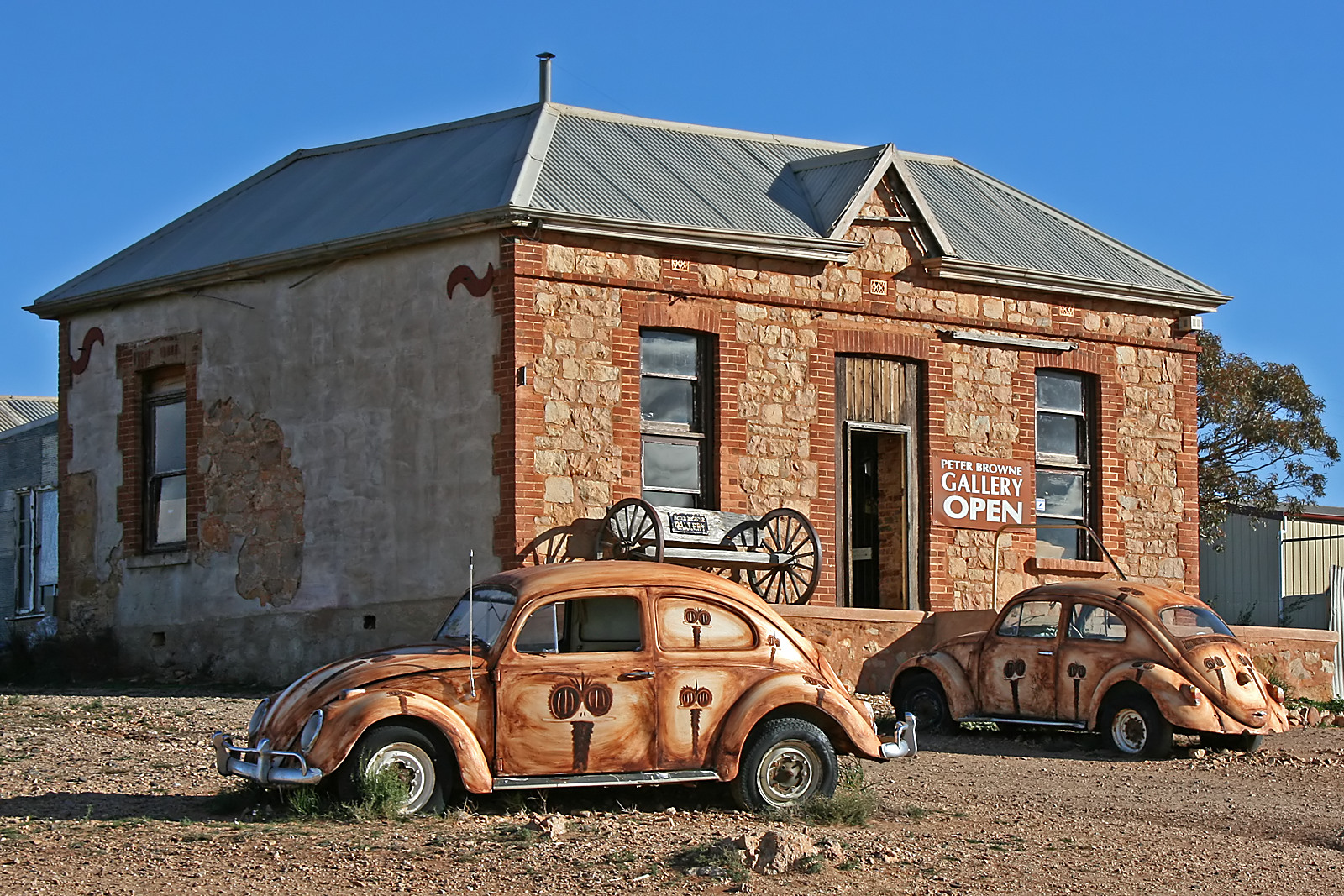
The Peter Browne Gallery, an artist run initiative in Silverton, New South Wales, operates out of a renovated ruin with unique advertising out the front

An artist-run space or artist-run centre (Canada) is a gallery or other facility operated or directed by artists, frequently circumventing the structures of public art centers, museums, or commercial galleries and allowing for a more experimental program. An artist-run initiative (ARI) is any project run by artists, including sound or visual artists, to present their and others' projects. They might approximate a traditional art gallery space in appearance or function, or they may take a markedly different approach, limited only by the artist's understanding of the term. "Artist-run initiatives" is an umbrella name for many types of artist-generated activity.

== Argentina ==
The two main artist-run spaces from Buenos Aires were Belleza y Felicidad and APPETITE, both set the standards for emerging art in Argentina. APPETITE was the first Argentinian gallery to be accepted at Frieze, London, and encouraged a lot of galleries to its San Telmo barrio.

== Australia ==
Many artist-run spaces exist in Australia. These spaces are often provided with funding assistance by government and state funding bodies.

== Canada ==
Artist-run centre is the common term of use for artist-initiated and managed organizations in Canada. Centres follow the not-for-profit arts organization model, do not charge admission fees, are non-commercial and de-emphasize the selling of work. The centres were created originally in response to a lack of opportunity to present contemporary work in Canada and a desire to network with other artists nationally and internationally. In the 1990s there were over 100 artist-run centres across Canada. There are currently at least 60 artist-run centres with continuous operating funding.

== Ireland ==
Although varying widely in structure, contemporary spaces like Ormston House, A4 Sounds, Pallas Projects, Sample-Studios, and 126 Artist-run Gallery have all emerged in the Republic of Ireland in the last 25 years.

After the 2008 financial crisis, many Irish cities experienced high levels of commercial vacancies. Annette Moloney, curator and author of Art in Slack Spaces (2010), "notes that artists [were] increasingly making use of the recession as an opportunity to use vacant shops." At this time, artist initiated projects like The Complex, Block T, Basic Space, The Joinery, and This is Not a Shop, availed of such spaces in Dublin, while Occupy Space, Ormston House, Raggle Taggle Consortium, and Faber Studios appeared in Limerick. Additionally, Basement Project Space, Cork Contemporary Projects, The Couch, The Black Mariah and Sample-Studios/Tactic in Cork, as well as 126 and projects by Engage Art Studios in Galway appeared more or less simultaneously.

In 2015, 126 published FOOTFALL: Articulating the Value of Artist Led Organisations in Ireland. The Future is Self-Organised – Artist-Run Spaces was an exhibition curated by Pallas Projects at the Limerick City Gallery of Art. A number of artist-run spaces and projects from Ireland and abroad were represented, as well as artists who have worked with Pallas over its 20 year history, in this 2015–16 exhibition. Pallas then co-published, with Onomatopee, Artist-Run Europe: Practice/Projects/Spaces later in 2016. It is a collection of experiences, and essays by various artist-run projects in Europe.

== Mexico ==
Biquini Wax is an experimental project in Mexico City of exhibitions, events, parties, and lectures that was started in the house of the artists. La Feria de la Acción (The Action Fair) was an artist-run fair that ran parallel to Zona Maco and Material Art Fair in Mexico City in 2020. It showed only interactive, relational, or performative works.

== New Zealand ==
A number of artist-run spaces have flourished throughout New Zealand since the 1990s. Some have been short-lived, whereas others have secured long-term funding and been operating for more than a decade.

- The Blue Oyster Art Project Space was established in Dunedin in 1999; its founding members were Emily Barr, Steve Carr, Wallace Chapman, Douglas Kelaher and Kate Plaisted. The gallery is currently located on Dowling Street in Dunedin's CBD and is funded by Creative New Zealand and Dunedin City Council. It is overseen by a board of Dunedin artists and arts professionals.
- The Physics Room in Christchurch emerged from South Island Art Projects, an organisation that in 1992 began presenting temporary and public art events without a formal location. In 1996 The Physics Room was established in a gallery space in the Christchurch Arts Centre. The gallery is now located in the CBD on Tuam Street and receives operational funding from Creative New Zealand.

== United Kingdom ==
There are numerous ARIs in the United Kingdom, often working around and critiquing the functioning of larger art institutions and organisations. An ARI is a project independently run by visual artists which generally showcases the work of local and emerging artists; many exist on low budgets and are managed by artist collectives. In the UK, ARIs tend to be smaller and less permanent than public and municipal organisations and can, for example, become established for the duration of an event or for the period of a lease on a property. Most ARIs in the UK are funded by the Arts Council, the national development agency for the arts in the UK, distributing public money from Government and the National Lottery.

Artist-run spaces had a particularly strong effect on urban regeneration in Glasgow, where the city won the accolade 'European Capital of Culture' in 1990 largely due to the large number of artist-run exhibition spaces and galleries, such as Transmission Gallery. Curator Hans Ulrich Obrist coined the term "The Glasgow Miracle" to describe this.

South London is home to a number of artist-run galleries including Matt’s gallery, Newport street gallery and Beaconsfield gallery.

East London has continued to house a number of artist-run spaces. In Shoreditch, London Charles Thomson founded the Stuckism International Gallery in 2002 warehouse. The last show there was in 2004. The Transition Gallery was founded in October 2002 in a converted garage close to Victoria Park, Hackney, London, and is run by artists Cathy Lomax and Alex Michon to show work by established and new contemporary artists. In 2016, the artist-run project Auto Italia South East relocated to Bethnal Green after programming and producing artists work nomadically in donated or squatted buildings since 2007.

studio1.1 was founded as a co-operative in 2003 and is run by artists Michael Keenan and Keran James. The gallery is an artist-run, not-for-profit space, located in a former sex shop in Redchurch Street, Shoreditch, East London.

One ARI, the Belfast-based Catalyst Arts, wrote that:

"Artist-run means initiating exchange; emphasizing cross and inter-disciplinary approaches to making art; developing networks; through curation, putting creative ideas and arguments into action"

=== Scotland ===
Wasps Studios is a country-wide, artist-run initiative that has been operating in Scotland since 1977.

=== Northern Ireland ===
Catalyst Arts is based directly on Transmission, and in turn inspired 126 in Galway. Artcetera, PS², Platform, and the Belfast Print Workshop are all other artist-run spaces in Belfast.

== United States ==
=== Chicago ===
Chicago has a long tradition of artist-run spaces and projects dating back to the late 1800s. In 1876 artist D. Knight Carter founded Vincennes Gallery of Fine Arts which was reorganized in 1880, by Frank C. Bromley, Henry Arthur Elkins along with other artist to establish a permanent gallery and residency for studio artists.

In 1984, the exhibition Alternative Spaces curated by Lynne Warren at the Museum of Contemporary Art catalogued the scores of artists and artists' spaces to emerge in Chicago including a wave of alternative spaces that emerged from 1960s through 1984 including Artemisia Gallery (1973–2003), ARC Gallery (1973–), Gallery Bugs Bunny (1968–1972), N.A.M.E. Gallery (1973–1997), NAB Gallery (1974–1984), Randolph Street Gallery (1979–1998), 1019 W. Lake St./Noise Factory (1981–1985), W.P.A. Gallery (1981–?) and Axe Street Arena (1985–1989).

In 2009, Artist-run Chicago was mounted by the Hyde Park Art Center and featured notable artist-run spaces operating between the late 1990s and 2009.

=== Los Angeles ===
Los Angeles has a tradition of artist run spaces dating back to at least the 1950s. Chris Burden's Shoot piece took place in a space run by artist Barbara T. Smith. Los Angeles Contemporary Exhibitions was founded by several individuals including two artists. Machine Project, Pretend Gallery, Actual Size, and Human Resources are all managed by artists. Currently Los Angeles has a vibrant artist-run scene, as evidenced by an artist-run fair called Other Places Art Fair (OPAF), consisting of almost entirely artist-run spaces and initiatives.

=== New York ===
During the 1950s in Manhattan, artist-run co-ops became the alternative to the uptown Madison Avenue galleries that catered mostly to wealthy blue-chip and European art-oriented collectors. From the early 1950s to the early 1960s the Tenth Street galleries located mostly in the East Village in lower Manhattan became the proving ground for much of the contemporary art that achieved popularity and commercial success in the decades that followed. During the 1960s, the Park Place Gallery became the first important contemporary gallery in SoHo. Park Place gallery was an artist-run cooperative that featured cutting-edge Geometric abstraction. Eventually, by the 1970s, SoHo became the new center for the New York art world as hundreds of commercial galleries opened in a sudden wave of artistic prosperity.

Contemporary artist-run galleries include:

- MINUS SPACE is an artist-run curatorial project devoted to reductive art. Minus Space maintains an exhibition space in Brooklyn and curates exhibitions at other venues nationally and internationally. Minus Space also has a location on the Internet enabling it to collaborate with other institutions.

=== San Francisco ===
Savernack Street is an artist-run micro-gallery located in San Francisco's Mission District created and curated by artist Carrie Sinclair Katz. The gallery interior is inaccessible to visitors and artwork can only be viewed by looking through a reverse peephole located on the storefront. The exhibitions usually feature a single piece of miniature artwork that appears larger or life sized when viewed through the peephole.

=== Portland ===
Portland, Oregon, is home to artist-run initiatives including Carnation Contemporary and Chicken Coop Contemporary.

== See also ==
- Arts Council England
- Not-for-profit arts organization
- City Racing
- studio1.1
- Sluice Art Fair
