= Paul Noble =

British artist

- Born: 1963 (age 62–63); Dilston, Northumberland
- Education: Humberside College
- Known for: Drawing, sculpture
- Notable work: Nobson Newtown, The Doley Game
- Awards: Paul Hamlyn Award 2000

Paul Noble (born 1963) is a British visual artist.

== Life and career ==
Noble studied at Humberside College of Higher Education (1983–1986) and Sunderland Polytechnic (1982–1983), before moving to London in 1987. He was one of the five founder members of the co-operative who formed the City Racing gallery in London (1988–98). Noble is most well known as the creator of Nobson Newtown. In 2000 Noble was the recipient of an award from the Paul Hamlyn Foundation. Currently Mr. Noble lives and works in London.

== Exhibitions ==
Noble has exhibited his work at Cubitt Gallery (1995); Chisenhale Gallery (1998); Tate Gallery (1999); and Whitechapel Art Gallery (2004). Paul Noble created a new installation for the Laing Art Gallery in Newcastle upon Tyne, in October 2010.

In 2011, Paul Noble presented TENT, an exhibition at Cooper Gallery, DJCAD, University of Dundee and an Artist's book with the same title. Both connect to the artist's long term Nobson Newtown project.

Noble is represented by Gagosian Gallery

His most recent exhibition with the gallery took place in 2018 at their Geneva, Switzerland, location.
