= City Racing =

British artist-run space

Coordinates: 51°28′58″N 0°6′50″W

- Established: 1988
- Founders: Matt Hale, Paul Noble, John Burgess, Keith Coventry, Peter Owen
- Dissolved: 1998
- Type: artist-run space
- Purpose: contemporary art, pop art,
- Location: Kennington, South London
- Key people: Matt Hale, Paul Noble, John Burgess, Keith Coventry, Peter Owen, Sarah Lucas, Fiona Banner, Lucy Gunning, Ceal Floyer, Gillian Wearing

City Racing was a squatted artist-run space in Oval Mansions, Kennington, South London which was active between 1988 and 1998. It was a cooperative by five artists Matt Hale, Paul Noble, John Burgess, Keith Coventry and Peter Owen. They set up the gallery in a former betting shop near The Oval cricket ground, hence the derivation of the gallery name. City Racing became an important and renowned exhibition space; its openings provided a networking opportunity for many artists.

== History ==
A show was organised by Keith Coventry and Peter Owen as a way to show their work without having to court commercial West End galleries, which could be difficult and intimidating to approach without a reputation. Matt Hale became involved in the second show, which was the squatted betting shop which Coventry was using as his studio. Matt Hale said "We tried to make it as white-cube like as possible, as gallery-like as possible."

Artists who had early exhibitions at City Racing include Sarah Lucas and Gillian Wearing. The space received funding from the London Arts Board.

== Influence ==
In its later years, City Racing was accepted to some extent by the art establishment, and was viewed by some as a route for artists to other more commercial and established galleries. It was featured in Time Out and City Limits as part of a new alternative art scene happening in London. This led to a benefit for the gallery organised by Karsten Schubert. David Burrows wrote that "in one sense, City Racing refused to be marginalised from the mainstream and had conventional career aspirations."

A retrospective book was published by Black Dog, called City Racing, The Life and Times of an artist Run Gallery. In 2001 the Institute of Contemporary Arts presented a retrospective of work exhibited at City Racing, entitled City Racing 1988-98: a Partial Account.

== See also ==
- UK artist-run initiatives
- Artist-run space
- Art group
