= MOT (gallery) =

Coordinates: 51°32′8″N 0°3′37″W

MOT International, formerly MOT Gallery, was a contemporary art gallery in east London run by Chris Hammond. It opened in 2002 and closed in 2016.

== History ==
The MOT gallery was founded in 2002 by Chris Hammond, Floyd Varey and Mally Mallinson. It was run as an "independent space and curatorial project".

In August 2002, as the first of two projects taking place during that summer, Louise Harris showed new works, which addressed a subject via a particular medium, including watercolours of blondes, landscape images made from felt and abstract collages with paper on the theme of sex.

In 2005, Hammond curated Shezad Dawood's Paradise Row. Dawood bought a run-down Georgian house in Paradise Row, Bethnal Green and renovated the property with the interior being white throughout. It was then put up for sale through an estate agent, Blake Stanley, the result being simultaneously an art exhibition and a conventional property vending. Hammond said, "Fantasy is really important, both in terms of architecture and where you want to live. Architecture is all about a projection of where you want to live, it's about imagining space that doesn't actually exist yet." Although the initial idea was a hoax to confuse the estate agent as to the nature of the enterprise, he took to it as a good marketing venture to local creatives and a novel way to enhance his new business.

In July 2006, MOT invited Shai Ohayon to curate "The Real Canadian", a group exhibition featuring emerging Canadian artists Elizabeth Fearon, Jason Kronenwald and Robert Waters. In December 2006, the PM Gallery in Toronto, Ontario, Canada, presented Bubble & Squeak, curated by London-based Shai Ohayon, to showcase artists who had been exhibited at MOT. Also in 2006 the gallery was renamed to MOT International and was incorporated as a limited company

In 2007 Iwona Blazwick chose Elizabeth Price's film At the House of Mr X (2007), shown at the gallery, for her most significant show and artist of the year for Frieze magazine.

The gallery's first location was at Unit 54/5th floor, Regent Studios, 8 Andrews Road, London E8 4QN. It was housed in Regent Studios, which is also home to the Transition Gallery and Five Years Gallery. The nearest tube station is Bethnal Green.

In September 2011 MOT International opened its first location in Brussels on Rue Vandenbrandenstraat 1. The gallery was subsequently concurrently located at Avenue Louise and Place du Petit Sablon from spring 2013 until 2016.

In April 2012 MOT International opened a new London location in Mayfair at 72 New Bond St. Curated exhibitions and projects continued at the original Regent Studios location which was renamed MOT International Projects.

In early 2016 it was announced the gallery would be moving to a new central London location at 5 Babmaes St, St. James's that Autumn.

Artists exhibited at the gallery include Jeremy Deller, Liam Gillick, Martin Creed, Martin Kippenberger, Simon Patterson, Sarah Lucas, Matthew Collings, Matthew Higgs, and Mark Wallinger.

Artists represented by the gallery in mid 2016 were: BANK, Ericka Beckman, Simon Bedwell, Pavel Büchler, Braco Dimitrijevic, Karl Haendel, Susan Hiller, Seung-taek Lee, Liu Ding, Simon Mathers, Helmut Middendorf, Beatriz Olabarrieta, Dennis Oppenheim, Katrina Palmer, Elizabeth Price, Laure Prouvost, Dan Rees, Clunie Reid, Florian Roithmayr, John Russell, Marinella Senatore, Elisa Sighicelli, Ulrich Strothjohann, Amikam Toren, Ulay, Stephen Willats, Nil Yalter.

It received funding from the Arts Council of England.

In July 2016 MOT International Limited was voluntarily wound up due to insolvency and went into liquidation.
