= IMT Gallery =

Art gallery in London, England

Coordinates: 51°31′53″N 0°3′23″W

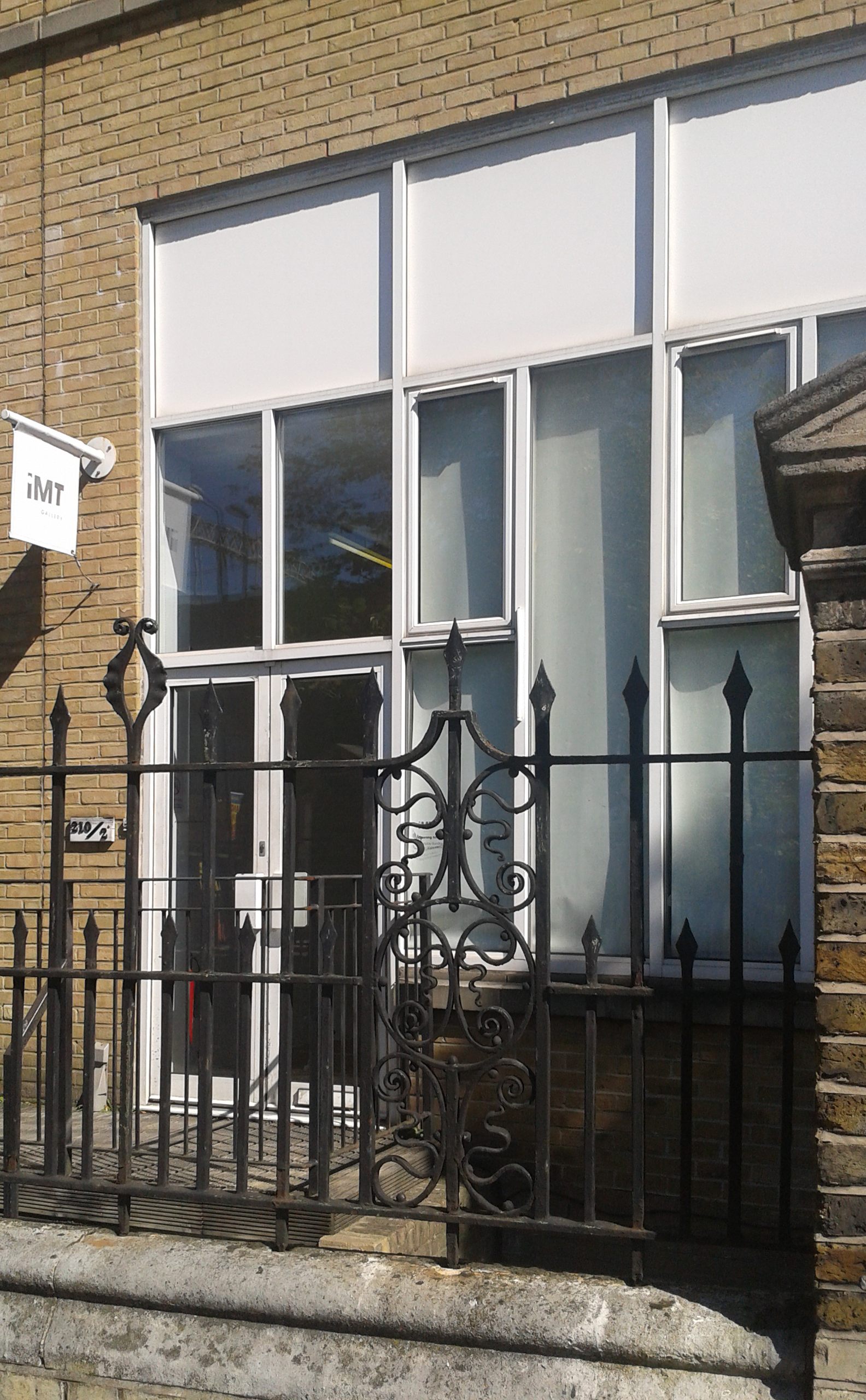
IMT Gallery

IMT Gallery (also known as IMT or Image Music Text) is a contemporary art gallery in Bethnal Green in London's East End.

== History ==
IMT Gallery was founded by Lindsay Friend in 2005 as IMT, opening with the first London solo exhibition by O Zhang. Other artists whose first London solo exhibitions were held at IMT Gallery include Laura Pawela, Marek Chołoniewski, Lotte Rose Kjær Skau, Henrik Schrat, Mark Peter Wright and Mathew Parkin. In January 2011 IMT became IMT Gallery and began representing artists alongside its exhibition programme. Its represented artists have included Ra Tack, Maggie Roberts, David Burrows and Plastique Fantastique. From 2005 to 2023 IMT Gallery was curated by Mark Rohtmaa-Jackson, alongside Nicole Sansone from 2014 to 2016 and Kirsten Cooke from 2021. Lindsay Friend took on sole curatorial responsibility for the gallery in 2023 when Rohtmaa-Jackson moved to Iceland to become director of LungA School.

== Programme ==
The gallery has shown an eclectic programme with particular emphasis on installation, sound art and multimedia art alongside exhibitions of represented artists.

Notable exhibitions include Wandering/WILDING: Blackness on the Internet with Niv Acosta, Hannah Black, Evan Ifekoya, E. Jane, Devin Kenny, Tabita Rezaïre and Fannie Sosa, curated by Legacy Russell with associated events at the Institute of Contemporary Arts; Campaign: an exhibition acting as the campaign headquarters for Shrigley's 2015 general election bid for Hackney South and Shoreditch; P&S Recipe Shop in 2006 in which the gallery was transformed into a fully functioning Malaysian style café by artists Yak Beow Seah and Chong Boon Pok, and 2010's Dead Fingers Talk: The Tape Experiments of William S. Burroughs, an exhibition of unreleased experiments with audio tape by William S. Burroughs alongside work by artists, writers and musicians including Steve Aylett, Lawrence English, Anthony Joseph, Negativland, Plastique Fantastique (David Burrows & Simon O'Sullivan), Giorgio Sadotti, Scanner, Terre Thaemlitz, Thomson & Craighead, Laureana Toledo and Ultra-red.

In 2009 Mark Peter Wright was awarded the BASCA British Composer Award in Sonic Art for his work A Quiet Reverie, which premiered at IMT in 2008 as part of the sound art exhibition Audio Forensics. In 2014 Lotte Rose Kjær Skau won the Helle & Arenth Jacobsen's Grant for Young Artists award at the Kunsthal Charlottenborg Spring Exhibition for her video How to Get Somewhere (2012), exhibited at IMT Gallery earlier that year.

From 2009 to 2015 the gallery also hosted regular screenings and events curated by Filmarmalade, a London-based publisher and DVD label specialising in contemporary artists' film and video works.

IMT Gallery's exhibitions have been supported by a number of institutions, including the Arts Council England, the Henry Moore Foundation, the Japan Foundation, the OCA: the Office for Contemporary Art Norway, the Statens Kunstfond and the Polish Cultural Institute.
