= LungA Art Festival =

Icelandic art and music festival

- Frequency: Annually (in mid-July)
- Location: Seyðisfjörður
- Years active: 2000–2024
- Inaugurated: July 2000; 26 years ago
- Founder: Björt Sigfinnsdóttir, Alla Borgþórs, Stefán Benedikt Vilhelmsson and Halldóra Malin Pétursdóttir
- Most recent: 15 July 2024 – 21 July 2024
- Participants: See Artists / Instructors
- Website: lunga.is

LungA Art Festival, LungA Festival or simply LungA, was an annual art and music festival held in Seyðisfjörður, East Iceland from 2000 to 2024. The festival took place in mid-July and was organized as a week of workshops, lectures and other activities, ending with a weekend of exhibitions and concerts.

The festival's name is a contraction of 'Listahátíð ungs fólks á Austurlandi' (Art festival of young people in the East).

In 2013 the festival sparked the creation of the LungA School, an artist-run art school that operates independently of the festival.

== History ==
LungA was started in 2000 by Björt Sigfinnsdóttir, a 15 year old resident of Seyðisfjörður, her mother Aðalheiður Lóa Borgþórsdóttir (Alla Borgþórs), and her friends Stefán Benedikt Vilhelmsson and Halldóra Malin Pétursdóttir, to provide art and cultural activities that were felt to be otherwise difficult to access for young people in the town. Helena Aðalsteinsdóttir and Þórhildur Tinna Sigurðardóttir took over as directors of the festival from Sigfinnsdóttir in 2022.

By 2024 it was felt that the costs of running the festival was no longer manageable given the limited funding available, and it was announced that the 2024 iteration of the festival would be its last.

== Artists / Instructors ==
Over the years, some of the artists and instructors who have been part of LungA Art Festival have included: Bashar Murad, Hjaltalín, Tara Mobee, Reykjavík!, Reykjavíkurdætur, Sykur, Daði Freyr, Aron Can, JFDR, Svala Björgvins, Sóley, Princess Nokia, Ragnar Kjartansson, Henrik Vibskov, Goddur, Andri Snær Magnason, Curver, Hugleikur Dagsson, Huerco S, CGFC, Bjössi of Mínus, DJ Gísli Galdur of Trabant, and Biggi of Maus. In July 2023 Pussy Riot performed at LungA Festival for their first performance in Iceland after band members Maria Alyokhina and Lucy Shtein were granted Icelandic citizenship earlier that year, having fled Russia during the 2022 Invasion of Ukraine.

LungA was a part of Keychange, a global network and movement working towards gender equality in the music industry.
