= Mark Jackson (disambiguation) =

Mark Jackson (born 1965) is an American former basketball guard and former head coach of the Golden State Warriors.

Mark or Marc Jackson may also refer to:

== Arts and entertainment ==
- Mark Jackson, R&B musician and member of the 1950s American R&B group the Crows
- Marc Evan Jackson (born 1970), American comedian and actor
- Mark Jackson (musician) (born 1970), English musician, member of VNV Nation
- Mark Jackson (actor) (born 1982), English actor known for his appearance as Isaac on The Orville

== Sports ==
=== American football ===
- Mark Jackson (quarterback) (born 1954), American football player
- Mark Jackson (defensive back) (born 1962), American football player
- Mark Jackson (wide receiver) (born 1963), American football player
- Mark Jackson (athletic director) (born 1972), American football coach/administrator

=== Other sports ===
- Mark Jackson (Australian footballer) (born 1959), Australian rules footballer and actor
- Mark Jackson (hurdler) (born 1969), Canadian track and field athlete
- Mark Jackson (triple jumper) (born 1991), American triple jumper, runner-up at the 2014 NCAA Division I Indoor Track and Field Championships
- Marc Jackson (born 1975), American professional basketball player
- Mark Jackson (footballer, born 1977), English footballer
- Mark Jackson (speed skater) (born 1980), New Zealand Olympic speed skater

== Others ==
- Mark Jackson (curator) (born 1976), American British curator
