= CGFC (art group) =

Performance art group from Reykjavík, Iceland

CGFC is an experimental performance art group from Reykjavík, Iceland. It was founded in 2015 by Arnar Geir Gústafsson, Ýr Jóhannsdóttir, Birnir Jón Sigurðsson and Hallveig Kristín Eiríksdóttir. Their work is driven by experiments with textiles and performance, and is often characterized by their use of recycled materials.

== Background ==
CGFC was originally formed as a punk band in 2015, but the group's work has since then expanded into theatre performance, live art, video and textile installations. Its core members are Hallveig Kristín Eiríksdóttir (performer and director), Arnar Geir Gústafsson (performer and sociologist), Ýr Jóhannsdóttir (textile designer and performer) and Birnir Jón Sigurðsson (performer and director), who have all been with the group from the start.

Their most notable production, in co-operation with the Reykjavík City Theatre, is Potatoes which was nominated for Gríman - The Icelandic Theatre Awards as Best Play in 2020. During the devising process, the group painted a portrait of Helga Gísladóttir, an unknown potato farmer, and donated it to the Icelandic Ministry of Industries and Innovation where it now hangs. The play was picked up by the National Broadcasting Company of Iceland and premiered as a three part radio drama on March 6, 2021.

CGFC has collaborated with electronic musician Halldór Eldjárn of the band Sykur.

== Projects ==
Production name	Year performed	Written by	Place performed
Radio Activity	2015	Devised by CGFC	Platform Nord - Kristiansand
""I Thought it was Brilliant, a Fantastic Performance" -Henrik Vibskov"	2015	Devised by CGFC	Kaktus Art Space - Akureyri
STOP CGFC	2016	Devised by CGFC	LungA Art Festival - Seyðisfjörður
HEADLINER	2017	Devised by CGFC	Pólar Festival, LungA Art Festival, Möðrudalur, Sláturhúsið Residency - Egilsstaðir, Raufarhöfn, Klaksvík, Luleå, Helsinki
Brókun by CGFCrew	2018	Devised by CGFC	Háskar Art Festival - Reykjavík
NAUJH! feat. Halldór Eldjárn	2018	Devised by CGFC & Halldór Eldjárn	Mengi - Reykjavík
Potatoes	2019	Devised by CGFC & Halldór Eldjárn	Reykjavík City Theatre
Potates: Peeled	2021	Written by CGFC	RÚV
