= David Burrows =

David Burrows may refer to:

- David Burrows (artist) (born 1965), British contemporary artist and writer
- David Burrows (commissioner), member of the Northern Ireland Parades Commission
- David Burrows (footballer) (born 1968), English footballer
- David Burrows (sailor) (born 1977), Irish Olympic sailor
- Dave Burrows (born 1949), Canadian professional hockey player

== See also ==
- David Burrowes (born 1969), British politician
