= Mark Jackson (curator) =

American British curator

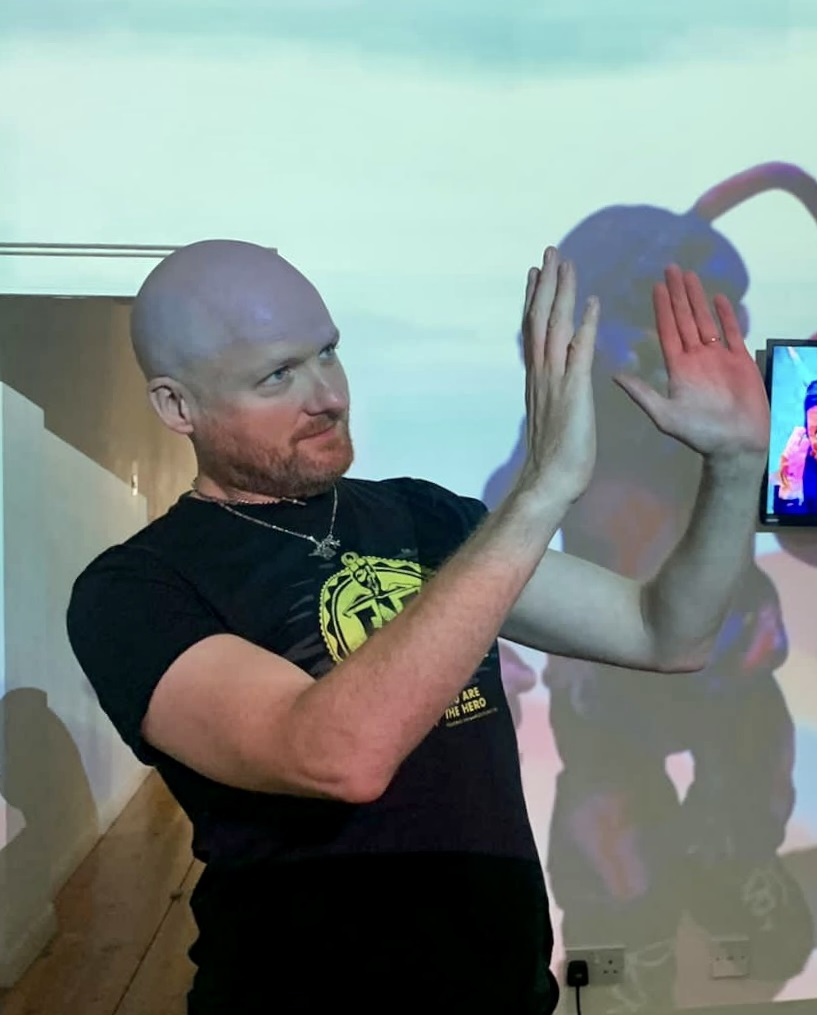
- Born: 1976 (age 49–50); Pittsburgh, Pennsylvania, U.S.
- Other name: Mark Rohtmaa-Jackson
- Occupations: art curator; artist; school director
- Relatives: Catriona Savage (sister); Lisa Jackson (actress) (sister)

Mark Peter Andrew Rohtmaa-Jackson (born 2 February 1976) is an US-American British artist, writer and curator based in the East of Iceland. In 2023 they were appointed the Director of LungA School, an independent artist-led art school in Seyðisfjörður.

== Life and work ==
Jackson is the co-founder of IMT Gallery in London, acting as the gallery's curator from 2005 to 2023. At IMT, Jackson specialised in sound art and audiovisual practice, curating exhibitions including 2010's Dead Fingers Talk: The Tape Experiments of William S. Burroughs, an exhibition built around a series of unreleased experiments with audio tape by William S. Burroughs. Their book on curating, Contemporary Exhibition-Making and Management, was published by Routledge in 2023.

Jackson originally studied and taught in the United Kingdom having a degree in painting from the University of East London and an MA in Fine Art Media from the Slade School of Fine Art. They taught on MA Sound Arts at London College of Communication from 2008 to 2014, BA Fine Art at Southampton Solent University from 2013 to 2014 and was a Senior Lecturer in art history and critical theory at Northumbria University, Newcastle, from 2014 to 2023 where they were the curator of exhibitions at the university's art gallery Gallery North from 2014-18. They are an authority on Burroughs's experiments with tape, completing a Doctor of Philosophy degree on the tape experiments at CRiSAP (Creative Research in Sound Arts Practice), University of the Arts London, supervised by Angus Carlyle, Salomé Voegelin and David Toop and speaking on Burroughs at conferences including Beyond the Cut-up: William S. Burroughs and the Image at The Photographers' Gallery and the Sound Art Curating conference at ZKM. In 2014 they composed This is a game called ‘Hello, hello, here is X.X.’ a limited-edition art-work in the form of a vinyl made from a recorded interview between Burroughs and journalist Roger Clarke.

Jackson has also exhibited or performed as an artist, including as part of Plastique Fantastique from 2011 to 2020.
