= CGFC =

CGFC may refer to:

- Caulfield Grammarians Football Club
- (CGFC (art group) Icelandic performance art group founded 2015
- Changsha Ginde F.C., now known as Guangzhou R&F F.C.
- Crawley Green F.C.
