= Fjarðarheiðargöng =

Proposed road tunnel in eastern Iceland

Coordinates: 65.260°N 14.226°W

Fjarðarheiðargöng (lit. 'Fjarðarheiði Tunnel'), also known as Seyðisfjarðargöng (lit. 'Seyðisfjörður Tunnel'), is a planned 13,300 metre long road tunnel along route 93 in eastern Iceland. The tunnel would replace a 600m high pass between Seyðisfjörður and Egilsstaðir. As of 2024, construction was scheduled to begin in 2025 with an expected construction time of about 7 years. The reason for construction is that the pass is often hit by snow storms making it impassable, and that the only car ferry reaching Iceland calls at Seyðisfjörður.

In 2025, the tunnel was delayed in the national transport plan and replaced with the Fjarðagöng tunnels, which will connect Seyðisfjörður to Mjóifjörður and Neskaupstaður instead. The Fjarðarheiðargöng tunnel is now estimated to be constructed some time after 2040.
