= Technical Museum of East Iceland =

Museum in Iceland

The Technical Museum of East Iceland (Icelandic: Tækniminjasafn Austurlands) was formally established in 1984, and its first exhibition opened in 1995 on the centenary of the town of Seyðisfjörður. The museum focuses on the history of Iceland's industrialization and technological advancement from roughly 1880 to the present day. Its core mission is to collect, preserve, register, and display the technical heritage, skills, artifacts, and narratives that define the region's technological history. The museum’s displays have historically illustrated how shifts in mechanical engineering, electricity, telecommunications, transport, and architecture affect societal lifestyles and the environment.

The museum was originally located in the Búðareyri area of Seyðisfjörður, historically known as the Wathne Estate (Wathnestorfa), occupying several heritage buildings integral to Iceland's technological history, including the Wathne House, Jóhann Hansson’s Machine Shop, the Shipyard, and Angró.

On December 18, 2020, a massive landslide hit Seyðisfjörður, destroying or severely damaging a large portion of the museum’s buildings. While significant parts of the collection were lost, a substantial number of artifacts were successfully rescued. Following the disaster, the museum’s strategy for heritage, collections, communication, outreach, and operations was comprehensively reviewed and revised to reflect the new reality. Today, a major redevelopment process is underway to establish a new museum site in a safe location within Seyðisfjörður. Despite the disaster, the museum's current exhibitions and public programs continue its mission and legacy within the community of Seyðisfjörður and among all its visitors, taking place both inside the surviving section of the Old Machine Shop and across various outdoor public spaces in the town.

In 2026, the museum was nominated for the Icelandic Museum Awards for its exceptional response and reconstruction efforts following the landslide.

== Current exhibitions and activities ==
Despite operating without a permanent main building since the landslide, the museum continues to disseminate its workhrough a variety of modern channels.

=== Búðareyri – a story of transformations ===
Located within the remaining structure of the Old Machine Shop, this exhibition focuses on the history of the Búðareyri area. Búðareyri was heavily impacted by the 2020 landslide; residential occupancy is now prohibited there, and commercial activity continues to decline. Opening in the summer of 2022, the exhibition spans from 1880 to the present day, tracking major shifts in residency, industry, society, and nature. These local transformations reflect broader national and global technological and social developments over the last 150 years. Because the building is located in an area that cannot be permanently protected from future hazards, the exhibition does not include registered museum artifacts. Instead, it was designed to be highly family-friendly, encouraging visitors to touch, interact, and experiment as they explore history. The exhibition was designed by Litten Nyström and Haraldur Karlsson, with curation by Elfa Hlín Sigrúnar Pétursdóttur and Katla Rut Pétursdóttur.

The outdoor component of the exhibition, set among the ruins left by the landslide, details the historical context of landslides in Búðareyri and provides an in-depth look at the prelude and aftermath of the major 2020 event.

=== Public space dissemination ===
The museum has installed open-air exhibitions and informational signage throughout Seyðisfjörður, accessible to the public 24/7. This integrates the museum directly into the townscape, enhancing self-guided activities for both residents and tourists.

- Outdoor Gallery: Located in the harbor area near the ferry terminal, the museum uses custom-built display stands for rotating open-air exhibitions. It currently hosts the exhibition Women's Work (Störf kvenna), dedicated to local women and their labor at the turn of the 20th century. Launched in the summer of 2024, the exhibition was part of a collaborative project titled WOMEN (KONUR) by the Technical Museum of East Iceland, the East Iceland Heritage Museum, and the East Iceland Regional Archives, highlighting the vital role of women in East Iceland's history.
- Cairns (Vörður): The museum has designed and installed custom-made "cairns" at key locations around the town. These structures nod to the ancient Icelandic tradition of building stone cairns to mark pathways and guide travelers. The museum's cairns feature integrated benches for visitors and offer insights into daily life in Seyðisfjörður, including community celebrations, the impact of natural forces on the community, and annual traditions.
- "How's it going...?" Art installation: Created by artist Guðjón Ketilsson, the outdoor artwork How are things...? was installed in 2006 to commemorate the centenary of the first submarine telegraph cable landing in Iceland at Seyðisfjörður. The piece is a replica of a historic telephone booth located near the cable's original landing site.
- Geirahús: The museum partners with Skaftfell The Center for Visual Arts in Iceland to manage the home of folk artist Ásgeir Jón Emilsson (known as Geiri), a local laborer who decorated his home with unique, creative expressions. While the house undergoes preservation and structural repairs and remains closed to the public, the museum has installed on-site signage featuring 360° virtual tours of the interior.
- The Slipway and El Grillo: Located just below the Machine Shop, two historical signs mark the old slipway — crucial to the historic operations of the Seyðisfjörður Machine Shop—and the deck gun salvaged from the oil tanker El Grillo, which was sunk in the fjord during World War II.

=== Digital presence ===
Through its official website, the museum provides active digital dissemination, hosting documentaries produced by the museum, links to Google Arts & Culture exhibits, and a digital extension of the Búðareyri exhibition. The museum also maintains active education and outreach profiles on Facebook and Instagram.

== Future development at Lónsleira ==
The future permanent home of the Technical Museum of East Iceland will be developed at Lónsleira, located near the ferry terminal in Seyðisfjörður. A new site became necessary as the original Búðareyri location cannot be safely protected against future landslides. The development plan includes two primary structures: the reconstruction of the historic Angró pier house alongside a brand-new adjacent building.

Following the 2020 disaster, an advisory committee on building relocation in Seyðisfjörður recommended in May 2021 that the Angró pier house be reconstructed at Lónsleira 15 to form the nucleus of the new museum grounds. Angró had been compromised during the 2020 landslide by a displacement wave generated when debris struck the fjord, and it sustained further structural damage during a severe storm a year later. The building was subsequently dismantled, and its salvageable timber framework was stored for restoration. Originally owned by the Múlaþing municipality, ownership of Angró was formally transferred to the Technical Museum in 2024.

In June 2026, foundational work commenced on the Lónsleira site to prepare for the re-erection of Angró. Current projections estimate that the museum will fully open its new facilities to the public in 2029. The architectural and engineering design for both the reconstructed Angró and the new annex is a collaboration between Arkibygg, Gingi Tæknistofa, Studíó Jæja, and Verkráð. Angró will serve as the primary exhibition wing, while the new building will house visitor receptions, a museum shop, multi-purpose spaces, and staff facilities.

A curatorial team consisting of Elfa Hlín Sigrúnar Pétursdóttir, Hanna Christel Sigurkarlsdóttir, and Ingvi Örn Þorsteinsson is currently designing the new permanent core exhibition, which will explore the intersection of technology, nature, and society through the lens of Seyðisfjörður's unique history.
