= Nam June Paik Art Center =

Art gallery in South Korea

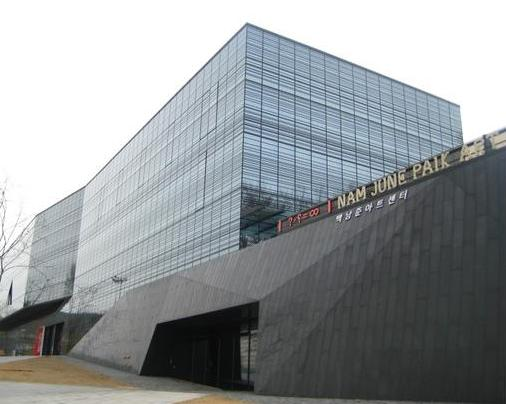
- Established: 2008
- Location: Giheung District, Yongin, South Korea
- Collections: Nam June Paik
- Public transit access: Giheung
- Website: njp.ggcf.kr

Nam June Paik Art Center is an art gallery in Giheung District, Yongin, Seoul Capital Area, South Korea. It opened in 2008 and hosts both permanent and temporary exhibitions. It is named after the Korean American artist Nam June Paik, whose work is included in its permanent collection.

The gallery awards the Nam June Paik Art Center Prize.

== Details ==
"The museum's exhibits follow no real order of chronology or renown, thereby inviting visitors to make up their own minds as to the merit and significance of each work."

== Nam June Paik Art Center Prize ==
The Nam June Paik Art Center Prize was established in 2009. It is "awarded to artists and theorists whose works are . . . amalgamating art and technology, pursuing new ways of communication, interacting with audiences, and fusing and conflating music, performance and visual art." The prize includes a solo exhibition at the Center.

=== Recipients ===
- 2009: Lee Seung-taek, Eun-Me Ahn, Ceal Floyer, and Robert Adrian
- 2010: Bruno Latour
- 2012: Doug Aitken
- 2014: Haroon Mirza
- 2016: Blast Theory
- 2018: Trevor Paglen
- 2020: CAMP
