= Lee Seung-taek =

Korean artist

- Hangul: 이승택
- RR: I Seungtaek
- MR: I Sŭngt'aek

Wind-Folk Amusement, 1971, wind, cloth, performance

Lee Seung-taek (born 12 May 1932) is a Korean interdisciplinary artist. He is a sculptor, an installation artist, and a performance artist—conceptualizing in the notion of "anti-concept" or "anti-art" in the Korean art scene.

As one of the first generation pioneers of experimental art in Korea, Lee is known for his "non-sculptural" artworks that include "display of pieces in stone, rope and newsprint." Lee mainly worked independently and created works that deviated from the dominant artistic concepts in Korea. "Unfettered by the demands of crude nationalism or from chasing the so-called international art world," Lee's work came to be seen as "starting point for a different kind of avant-garde lineage." He has strived to investigate new ways of creating art by experimenting with non-material objects.

In 2009, Lee was the first recipient to be awarded Nam June Paik Art Center Prize.

== Career ==
Born in Kowon, Hamgyeong Province in North Korea, Seung-taek Lee has had a wide range of interest since childhood. He used his talent for art to escape from North Korea during the Korean War. He made a living by drawing portraits for American soldiers during and after the Korean War. As a student, Lee became fascinated by Nietzsche's philosophy, which led him to pursue experimental art of the metaphysical. With his ambition to "leave a footprint as an artist in Korean modern art history", he decided to become an artist of his own world by thinking inversely about the world and freely expressing himself and his ideas.

According to the art critic Oh Sang-ghil, Lee was downgraded to a non-mainstream level in the Korean modern art world, since most artists and art critics "unwaveringly followed western art trends and believed that it was the only way to survive". Lee considered that those artists and critics were unaware of their own identity and began to experiment with trials and errors of imitation in order to understand the true nature of Korean modern art. He was often regarded as a "heretical and rebellious character" amongst the artists and critics in Korea; however, he continued his journey of pursuing his own art in a then-conventionalized world of Korean art. Beginning with his non-figurative installation art, History and Time, at the 1958 Undergraduate Exhibition for the Department of Sculpture at Hongik University, he departed from the conventions of the Korean modern art. While at an exhibition to receive the Nam June Paik Art Center International Art Award, the chief curator of the Nam June Paik Art Center, Tobias Berger, mentioned that "Seung-taek Lee's artwork surpasses the main centers of traditional western modern art history".

In 2008, Lee was Adviser of Korea Performance Art Spirit (KoPAS). In 1988, he served as Vice-president of Korean Fine Arts Association, and has worked as its Adviser since 1989. He became Representative Commissioner of various committees, such as Recycling through Art of National Theater of Korea in 2007, Le Biennale di Venezia in 1990, and the Exchange Exhibition of Modern Art between Korea and Japan in 1985. From 1970 to 1987, he lectured on modern art history in University of Seoul and Graduate School for nine years and in Mokwon University and Graduate School for nine years.

== Works ==
=== Earliest work: late 1950s ===
In the late 1950s, Seung-taek Lee was inspired by a small photo of a sculpture by Giacometti. The image depicted a female body composed of bare bones, without any flesh or muscle. Lee questioned himself whether he can even negate the bones, the remainder, and moved on to creating works without solid forms; he became interested in immateriality. He was then inspired by smoke coming out of Saudi Arabia's oil-burning furnace, which was broadcast on the news. He realized that smoke, wind, and fire are the only elements that can be expressed without a solid form.

After the Korean War came to a provisional end in 1953, Lee went to Hongik University in Seoul to major Sculpture. He made a large sculpture named History and Time in 1958 for his university graduation show. The work consists of a U-shaped piece of plaster, which is wrapped with barbed wire and smeared colors of red and blue. According to the artist, the red represents Communism and the blue represents Democracy. He wanted to express the "tragedy of weak countries caught between warring Cold War superpowers" during the Korean War.

In 1957, Lee was commissioned by his teacher and sculptor Kim Kyong-sung to help create a bronze statue of the U.S. general Douglas MacArthur, who was then respected by Koreans for his amphibious landing in September 1950 that turned the Korean War in favor of the United Nations and South Korean forces. During that year, Lee also produced one of his Godret stone pieces called Godret Stone (1957). Godret stone refers to a stone that is used for tying knots when plaiting handcrafted mats in Korea. His interest in fundamental changes in physical materiality led to the production of the Godret stone series. Although Lee's shaped Godret stones seem soft and shapeable, they are hard and solid in essence. In 2004, Lee further explained his thinking behind the piece in Kim Yung-hee's essay Following the Godret Stone: Entangled Energy/Spiritual World with Modernity. The work's visual impact comes from the "tension between the wooden bar, precariously hung from two thin cords, and the clusters of bifurcated stones that effectively conjure a sense of gravitational pressure".

=== 1960s ===
In the beginning of the 1960s, Lee traveled throughout Korea to find new subject matters for his art. He found them in nature—seas, beaches, fields and agricultural products—in artificial environments—stone walls in Jeju Island as well as manufactured architectural items—and in unfamiliar areas such as seaweed farms. In 1964, he created an installation work called The Wind Fence in the Han River on Nanji Island. The work was inspired by color rope fences around garlic fields in the countryside. The Wind Fence (1964) is composed of wood sticks and fabric. The wood sticks are firmly embedded to the ground in a circular orientation. The fabrics are tied to every stick and they horizontally connect each wood stick to another, forming four zig-zagged circles. Overall, they form a shape of a fence. Lee considers finding new subject matters significant for inventing new concept and method for his art. In the same year, he did some performance art such as The Burning Canvas Floating on the River (1964). He burned his old paintings and let them drift away in the Han River to demonstrate his defiant drive to "escape from the bonds of the past".

In 1961, Lee began the first of his onggi, or oji, the "dark semi-porous earthenware traditionally used in Korea for storing and fermenting various condiments", works. In the second exhibition of the Original Form Association (Wonhyonghoe), he publicly unveiled his onggi-based works. He joined the group for their second exhibition in November 1964 at the Central Information Center next to Toksu Palace in Seoul, Korea.

Lee also created works out of hair in the 1960s. In 1963, he produced the first of two 1963 works made with hair called My Hair. This work inspired a series of two-dimensional and installation works made with hair. In 1967, he created a huge installation work that was made from Lee's accidental experiment, which occurred when he went to a military camp near the DMZ to draw a portrait for a division commander. He obtained bags full of hair of new recruits and used them to create the installation work in a then-newly-built church.

In order to capture his large-scale experimental and performance artworks, Lee used photography since the early 1960s. Because the size of his work was not clear in photographs, he took pictures of himself with his art in order to clarify the scale of the works. The photos showing the artist and his process of field work have become a trademark of Seung-taek Lee.

=== 1970s ===
Seung-Taek Lee, Drawing, 1974, cord

Along with the Godret Stone series, Lee created the Tied Stone series starting in the late 50s. Many of his works surrounding the idea of 'tying' were produced in the 70s, such as Tied Stone (1972) and other Tied Stone series and Tied Book (1972). In order to defy the laws of nature, he changed the property of stone from hardness to tenderness through his works. Lee created other related pieces made with cords and ropes with porcelain and installation works, such as White Porcelain (1972) and Drawing (1974). In addition, he produced works that are made by nature. The unpredictability of his subjects, such as wind, fire, and smoke, played a significant role in the making of his non-materiality works. Paper Tree (1970) and Wind-Folk Amusement (1971) are Lee's signature works from the wind series. The artist used everyday materials, such as cloth and paper, to visualize the direction and force of the wind. At the MOT International exhibition in London, the Paper Tree installation and the photographic documentation of Wind-Folk Amusement give the form to the "transience of nature" and capture the energetic movement of the wind. Moreover, Lee's concept of non-materialization is revealed in the Fire series such as Burning Buddha Statue (1965–1971), in which he sets fire to a sacred icon. Such act is often overlooked as blasphemy against Buddha; however, according to the artist, it is an act of "purification" that recalls the ancient history of Buddhism. Natural landscape and elements act as an artistic medium, as well as a backdrop to Lee's performances and outdoor installations.

In the 1960s, poverty and aftermath of the Korean War resulted in economic development and modernization throughout society. A movement of planting trees on mountains began and Lee's awareness of the crisis of pollution developed. The green movement became another form of his experimental art. As he painted huge waterfalls on places around Bukhan Mountain, his other related works also became more eco-friendly and promoted the importance in saving nature damaged by civilization. Such ideas are portrayed in works such as Artist Planting Moss (1975) and Green Campaign (1975). Lee created a green landscape in Green Campaign Installation (1976), which resembles a green river, by pouring a mix of fertilizer, moss, and water on a rock in order to create a more natural design.

=== 1980s ===
In the 1980s, Lee continued producing works that contributed to the green movement. The series included Green (1983) and Green Campaign (1985), a performance at road repairing site. Many of his works had different forms of and interactions with the earth model. One of his performances is called Earth Play (1989), which was titled so because of the work's physical interaction with participants. He also created other earth pieces that intended to bring a sense of guilt to those who harm nature. In addition, Lee expressed his pleasure for working on his art in isolation, such as in the deep mountains or fields without concerning other people's attention. He oftentimes conducts experimental performances for himself or for a small number of people in the art field. He declared for the Self-Burning Performance Art Festival in 1989 that he would make one or two artworks in various types each day of the exhibition period, and later burn the works. He conducted Self-Burning Performance in 1989 and Burning Modern Sculpture in 1984 to demonstrate such ideas. Moreover, Lee presented his 'thinking inversely' philosophy by questioning the necessity of frames and their role for aesthetic presentation of paintings. He therefore produced works throughout the 70s and the 80s . Many of them were wooden frames with the corners and edges bound by colorful cords. His idea of 'thinking inversely' is also reflected on his works surrounding the topic of sex. He considers sex as the "foundation of human history" and that it has played a significant role for the societal evolution. Because sex and art are inseparable entities, many artists, including Seung-taek Lee, use sex as a motif. Through his object works like Sexual Organs on TV (1987), he satirized roles of television. On the other hand, Lee created his visual commentary on ethicality issues of sex. He placed genital-shaped objects on trees, liquor bottles, boots, and other objects in order to challenge the common notion of abashment about sexual images.

=== 1990s and onward ===
Lee has continued producing works related to the topics he has investigated for more than fifty years. He created more sculpture works surrounding environmental issues, such as Energyless Earth and Discouraged Earth in 1992. He also conducted several performances like Earth Performance (1990) and Wind Performance at a Back Hill (2009) at Nam June Paik Art Centre. Along with massive, painterly abstractions, Lee used watercolor, moss, and other materials to transform the land into a canvas. At the Gwangju Art Biennale, Lee exhibited a monumental, double self-portrait The Artist to be Out of Breath (1991). The work consists of "bales of old clothes bound together into spindly, multi-limbed armatures that sprout two massive, scowling heads". As if suffering from exhaustion, the twisted, body-like arrangements are laid out on the floor. Black and white patterned, wooden beams connect those arrangements. In a larger context, the work deals with the division of Korea and the allegory of a state torn apart by war, along with ideological differences from the Cold War. Furthermore, Lee created A Bridge Not Able to Cross in 1990 to portray the issues of the divided nation. With fervent ardor, Seung-taek Lee has "cultivated his own art world" for more than sixty years. His constant questioning of "can even this be art?" has further motivated him to investigate new non-material objects and art. He has continued having performances and exhibitions around the globe and produces works in Seoul, Korea.

== Awards ==
- 2013 Eunkwan (Korea's second highest Order for Cultural Merits) Award, Ministry of Culture, Sports, and Tourism, Korea
- 2009 Winner of Nam June Paik Art Center Prize 2009, Korea
- 2002 Achievement Award, DongA Art Festival, DongA Media, Korea
- 2000 Bokwan Order of Culture Merit Award from Minister of Culture, Sports, and Tourism, Korea
- 1994 Award from Minister of Culture, Sports, and Tourism, Korea
- 1985 The Grand Prize of International Outdoor Sculpture Festival, Aomori Museum of Art, Japan
- 1978 Wnnder of DongA Art Festival, DongA Media, Korea
- 1977 The Grand Prize of Space Art Award, SPACE Magazine, Korea
