= David Burrows (artist) =

British artist and writer

David Burrows (born 1965) is a British artist and writer. His work consists of drawings and paint-spattered, debris-littered, haphazard installations. He writes articles on art and aesthetics and was the editor of Article Press when based at Birmingham City University. He is currently a Reader in Fine Art at Slade School of Fine Art, where his research interests include the depictions of events and aftermaths, utopian narratives and indexical art practices.

== Life and work ==
Burrows was born in London and obtained an MA in Fine Art at Goldsmiths College in 1994. Between 1993 and 1995 he was a member of the art collective BANK with Simon Bedwell, John Russell, Milly Thompson and Andrew Williamson. In 2001 he was shortlisted for the Beck's Futures art prize. For several years he has collaborated with Simon O'Sullivan and others to create the fictional group Plastique Fantastique, who employ ritualised performance to manifest human and inhuman avatars who deliver communiqués from the past and the future.

Solo exhibitions include Praz-Delavallade, Paris (2001); fa projects, London (2002); Fredericke Taylor Gallery, New York (2002); Note, Arezzo (2002). Burrows' practice also includes collaborations, including with DJ Simpson at Artspace Sydney as part of an Arts Council England International Residency in 2003. Burrows received a Paul Hamlyn Award for Visual Artists in 2002.

In 2004 he had a major solo exhibition at the Chisenhale Gallery London.

He is represented by IMT Gallery, London.
