= Marinella Senatore =

Italian visual artist

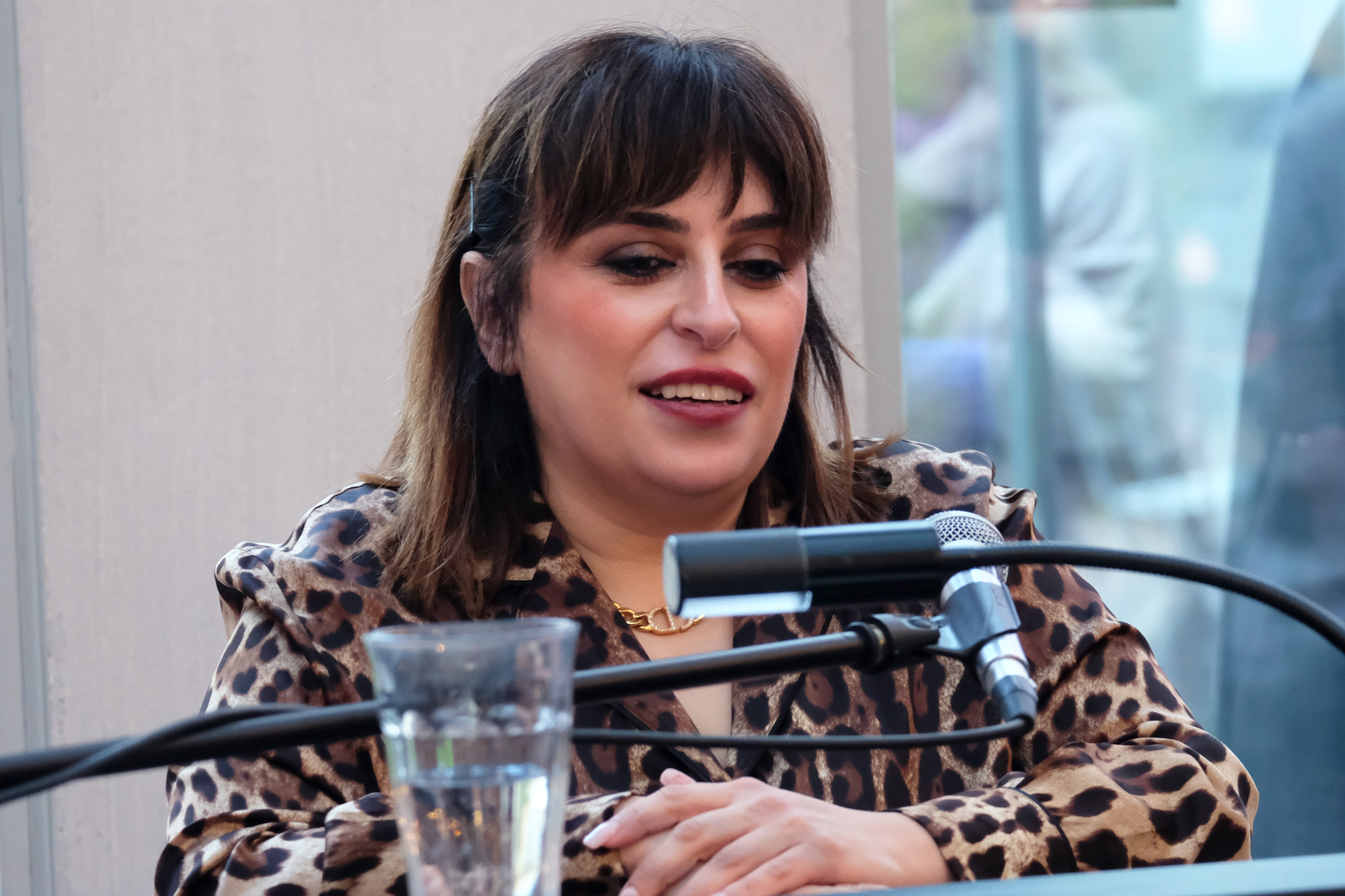
- Marinella Senatore, 2023
- Born: 1977 (age 48–49); Cava de' Tirreni
- Known for: Visual arts
- Website: marinella-senatore.com

Marinella Senatore (born 1977) is an Italian visual artist.

== Exhibitions ==
- 2011 – Museum of Contemporary Art of Rome, Rome, IT
- 2012 – Kunstlerhaus Bethanien, Berlin, D
- 2012 – Matadero, Madrid, ES
- 2012 – Quad, Derby, UK
- 2012 – ViaFarini, Milan, IT
- 2013 – Castello di Rivoli (Turin)
- 2013 – Musei Civici, Cagliari, IT
- 2013 – Nomas Foundation/Teatro Valle occupato, Rome, IT
- 2014 – Estman Radio, INSITU, Berlin, D
- 2014 – Kunsthalle St. Gallen, CH
- 2014 – Museum of Contemporary Art, Santa Barbara, US
- 2014 – The School of Narrative Dance, Israel, Petah Tikva Museum of Art, IL
- 2014 – MOT International, London, UK
- 2023 – Villa Stuck, Munich, Germany
- 2025 – Estorick Collection, London, England
- 2026 – Italian Capital of Culture, L'Aquila, Italy

== Awards ==
- 2009: Dena Foundation Fellowship
- 2010: New York Prize
- 2011: fellowship, The American Academy in Rome; finalist, Furla Art Award;
- 2013: Gotham Prize; fellowship, Castello di Rivoli – Museum of Contemporary Art.
- 2014: Maxxi Prize.

== Residencies ==
- 2005 – Ratti Foundation, Como, IT
- 2009 – Art Omi, Omi International Center, Ghent, US
- 2010 – ISCP, Brooklyn, New York, US
- 2011 – Künstlerhaus Bethanien, Berlin, D
- 2012 – American Academy in Rome IT
- 2012 – Via Farini, Milan, IT
