= O Zhang =

Chinese artist based in New York (born 1976)

O Zhang, SALUTE TO THE PATRIOTS from The World is Yours (But Also Ours), 2008.

O Zhang (Chinese: 张鸥; pinyin: Zhang Ou; born November 23, 1976, Guangzhou, China) is a Chinese artist based in New York. Although she is best known for her photographs depicting Chinese youth, Zhang also makes paintings, short films and installations. She was trained as an oil painter at the Central Academy of Fine Art in Beijing before moving to London where she earned two MAs, the first in Fine Arts from Byam Shaw School of Art, and the second from the Royal College of Art in Photography. In 2004 Zhang moved to New York City, where she has since lived and worked, making yearly returns to her native China.

== Childhood ==
Zhang was born in the city of Guangzhou to English-translator parents who were forced, by the Chinese Cultural Revolution government, to move to the edge of Jishou, a village in the Hunan Province, soon after Zhang's birth. In the countryside Zhang was exposed to and learned the language of ethnic minority groups like the Miao and the Tujia, and demonstrated her ability to adapt to situations where she was an "outsider." Zhang remembers her childhood as "very peaceful and colorful," and notes that this is where she established the foundation for her aesthetic preferences.

== Education ==
Zhang attended schools in both China and the United Kingdom.

=== China: Guangzhou and Beijing ===
After six and a half years in Jishou, Zhang and her parents moved back to Guangzhou, which she considers to be her hometown. Zhang studied art at the Guangzhou Children's Palace, the Guangzhou Academy of Art affiliate Middle School and at nineteen she left Guangzhou to attend the Central Academy of Fine Arts in Beijing. It was in Beijing that Zhang discovered photography, yet to her dismay the Central Academy did not have a photography department. Thus, Zhang taught herself photography technique after hours when she often snuck into the school studios with models in order to shoot. For her first series, Masterpieces in my Eyes, Zhang projected images of Western figurative masterpieces on nude female models and photographed them in an effort to impose, "the male standards of female form" upon the models. Zhang graduated from the Central Academy of Fine Arts in 2000.

=== United Kingdom: London ===
Zhang says that after graduating from the Central Academy she "wanted to go abroad to see the outside world," so she moved to London to study at the Byam Shaw School of Art and made two new series, Water Moon (2001–02) and Black Hair. For Water Moon, Zhang employed the same method used in Masterpieces in my Eyes, however, she projected Ming dynasty erotic paintings, which were outlawed in China, on faceless models. For Black Hair, Zhang photographed the wet hair of Asian women arranged in brush-like "strokes" on their backs, mimicking Chinese characters. One critic writes of the series, "The hair represents a significant and lasting genetic trait of Asian women and is therefore a symbol of survival, and Chinese writing is still a lasting tradition, yet both are out of context, the writing is not on paper and the woman is in a Western tub". Zhang received her second MA in London at The Royal College of Art where she began to plan her next project that would involve her returning to China, Horizon (2004).

== Major projects ==
=== Horizon ===
Zhang's inspiration for Horizon came from the Cultural Revolution slogan, "rebellion is the rule." Her goal was to produce a series of images that question current assumptions about the primacy of western power. The installation consists of a three row grid of photographs: on the top young Chinese girls squat on the hill looking down to the viewer, in the middle row's girls eyes are at the viewer's eye level and in the bottom row the girls are placed in a field of grass and look up to the viewer. The positioning of the horizon-line is consistent from photo to photo so that throughout each row the images merge to become one larger landscape. Critic JJ Charlesworth writes of the series:

O Zhang photographs small Chinese girls as they crouch down and stare back at the camera. Dominating the frame and the spectator, Zhang's little subjects offer oddly sinister and uncomprehending expressions. The West's self-conscious fascination with contemporary China reverberates through Zhang's portraits, which co-opt the brand-logo myth of childhood innocence and global harmony, making her endearing subjects alien, monstrous and threatening.

=== Daddy and I ===
Zhang's next series, Daddy and I, concerns itself with adolescent adopted Chinese girls and their adoptive American Caucasian fathers in New York, New Jersey, Connecticut and Oregon. Since 1991, when China loosened its adoption law, American families have adopted more than 55,000 Chinese children, almost all girls. Zhang, in a speech given on WPS1 Art Radio, P.S.1 Contemporary Art Center on March 27, 2008, discusses what questions motivated her to move forward with the Daddy and I project. She states:

By photographing adopted Chinese girls and their Western fathers in America, I try to capture the affection between a female child and an adult male. What is the nature of this complex relationship, especially when different ethnic and cultural backgrounds are introduced? … Through the relationship of the emerging feminine power of the adolescent girl to the mature father, each image explores the unfathomable relation of the two inseparable, yet often divided cultures: East and West.

==== Criticisms ====
Some critics see the works as manipulative and claim that the girls look like "Thai Lolitas," while others argue that it is necessary to realize that the work feeds into common stereotypes and concepts of political correctness, thus making the images more than they are and asking the viewer not to submit their interpretations to stereotypes.

=== The World is Yours (But Also Ours) ===
Zhang's project, The World is Yours (But Also Ours), completed in July–August 2008, was shown at the Frieze Art Fair 2008 and the CRG Gallery, NY in December 2008. The images depict Chinese youth wearing American style tee-shirts featuring "Chinglish" statements and bordered with Cultural Revolution-era propaganda slogans. In doing so the series visually captures conflicts in modern-day Chinese culture, such as communist legacy vs. recent rapid economic development and traditional culture vs. western popular culture, thus encapsulating the identity crisis facing Chinese youth and modern China.

=== Recent projects ===
Zhang's book (in Chinese) that documents her experiences as a Chinese art student living in London titled, An Empire Where The Moon Light Never Fades was published by Shanghai Art and Literature Publishing House in January 2009

Cutting the Blaze to New Frontiers marks the 70th anniversary of the 1939-40 New York World's Fair. The project harkens back to its inspirational theme "the Dawn of a New Day" against the backdrop of today's financial crisis. The artist assembled a miniature fair in collaboration with a group of Queens youth of immigrant parents. Having never visited their parents' countries of origin, the young participants imagined their own "motherland" as a national pavilion. Her mini-fair reflects the complex cultural demographics of Queens and its vigor as the future of the nation. The project was the subject of a solo exhibition at the Queens Museum of Art.

Zhang was commissioned by Chinatown Art Space and Royal Opera House in London to make a short film about Anna May Wong (1905–61), the first Asian-American actress who gained a star on the Hollywood Walk of Fame. Of Anna And Dreams is an interpretation of her three dreams, exploring three themes in her life: fear, identity complex and lust for love.

== Awards ==
Zhang is a participant in the Artists Residency Program at Queens Museum of Art, New York and is the recipient of fellowships from the Rockefeller Foundation Bellagio Center, The MacDowell Colony, and the Wilson Centre for Photography. She was awarded the Fuji Film Student Award and The Royal College of Photography Graduate Award and was nominated/short-listed for The Chinese Contemporary Art Award, Beck's Futures Award, The Creative Capital Awards and The Louis Comfort Biennial Award. Zhang was the first student from mainland China to receive the Royal College of Art MA Photography degree which requires an approval honor by Prince Philip, Duke of Edinburgh.

== Public collections ==
- Solomon R. Guggenheim Museum, New York
- Santa Barbara Museum of Art, California
- Millennium Monument Art Museum, Beijing

== Selected solo exhibitions ==
- 2010:A Splendid Future for the Past, Forever & Today Gallery, New York, U.S.A

O Zhang - Horizon, Dirimart Gallery, Istanbul, Turkey

- 2009:Cutting The Blaze To New Frontiers, Queen's Museum, New York, U.S.A.

A Stream Bends For A Thousand Li, Asian Song Society, New York, U.S.A.
Horizon (Sky), public art project, Vancouver Gallery, Vancouver, Canada

- 2008:The World is Yours (But Also Ours), CRG Gallery, New York, NY
- 2007:Daddy & I, Pékin Fine Art Gallery, Beijing, China
- 2005:My Little Girl, IMT Gallery, London, UK

Horizon, Chinese Art Center, Manchester, UK
