= Plastique Fantastique =

British art group

Plastique Fantastique is a London-based art group active from 2004–present envisaged as a group of human and inhuman avatars delivering communiqués from the extreme past and the future. The group was originally conceived of by Simon O’Sullivan, a Senior Lecturer in Art History/Visual Culture at Goldsmiths, London, in a text written about the hypothetical architects of the exhibition New Life at Chisenhale Gallery, London, a 2004 exhibition by the artist David Burrows.

Since the appearance of their first manifesto, the story of Plastique Fantastique has been narrated through their comics. Burrows and O'Sullivan are constant figures in the group with other members changing regularly. Past and present members of Plastique Fantastique include David Burrows, Simon O’Sullivan, Alex Marzeta, Vanessa Page, Mark Jackson, Benedict Drew, Frankie Roberts, Harriet Skully, Ana Benlloch, Stuart Tait, Tom Clark, Simon Davenport, Joe Murray, Lawrence Leaman, Samudradaka and Aryapala.

Exhibitions and performances include the Hayward Gallery touring exhibition Shonky at the Metropolitan Arts Centre, Belfast; Dundee Contemporary Arts and Bury Art Museum, Greater Manchester from 2017 to 2018, There ls Not and Never Has Been Anything To Understand! at ASC Gallery, London; 176 Zabludowicz Collection, London; YOUR EXTINCTION OUR FUTURE! at IMT Gallery, London; OUTPOST, Norwich; Apex, Portsmouth; Aliceday Gallery, Brussels and Pratt Manhattan Gallery, New York. They have participated in 'GSK Contemporary' at the Royal Academy of Arts, London, 'The Chemical Wedding' Tate Britain, London 2008, the 'Space Time T' Music Festival at the Wysing Arts Centre and the 2010 Tatton Park Biennial.
