= Liu Ding =

Chinese artist (born 1976)

Liu Ding (Chinese: 刘鼎; born 1976, Changzhou, Jiangsu Province) is a Chinese artist and curator based in Beijing. Liu's artistic practices range from installation, painting, photography, and theatre set design and production, whereas his professional skills vary from magazine editorial, television production, and curatorial work.

== Exhibitions and artistic practices ==
Constantly challenging the conventional context of artists' status, art work, workers involving in the production of art work, galleries and museums, collectors, audiences, and so on, Liu's creation and reflection are often theoretical and involved with critical thinking. After abandoning formal education and moving to Shanghai, Liu started up Pink Studio in 2001, where he continued his artistic practice. In 2011, he co-founded Office of Art and Theory with Carol Yinghua Lu in Beijing.

His works have been exhibited in numerous art institutions including the Turner Museum and the Arnolfini Gallery in the UK, the Kunsthalle Wien in Austria, the Astrup Fearnley Museum of Modern Art in Norway, the São Paulo National Museum of Art in Brazil, the Center for Art and Media Karlsruhe, Germany, the RasquArt Center in Switzerland, Fondazione Sandretto Re Rebaudengo in Italy, the Seoul Municipal Museum of Art in Korea, the Luggage Store Gallery in San Francisco, USA, the Iberia Center for Contemporary Art in Beijing, the Shanghai Contemporary Museum of Art, and the Guangdong Museum of Art in Guangzhou, China. His conceptual art project Liu Ding's Store, begun in 2008, is a continuing project that discusses and presents the various visible and invisible mechanisms in the art system for the formation of value. Liu was chosen in 2009 as a representative of China at the 53rd Venice Biennale. Little Movements: Self-Practices in Contemporary Art, the project he and Carol Yinghua Lu initiated and curated together, was exhibited at the OCT Contemporary Art Terminal in Shenzhen in September 2011, and will go on an international tour from 2012. He also co-curated the 7th Shenzhen Sculpture Biennale, entitled Accidental Message: Art is Not a System, Not a World. His first solo exhibition in America, Liu Ding's Store: Take Home and Make Real the Priceless in Your Heart opened at the Frye Art Museum in Seattle in July 2012. Another solo exhibition opened in Hyundai Gallery, Seoul in the same year. Taking part in The Tanks: Art in Action to celebrate the opening of the new space of Tate Modern, Liu was selected to be one of the participant artists for the symposium Inside/Outside: Materialising the Social in July 2012, to conduct his first “non-theatrical performance”, I simply Appear in the Company of…, a non-theatrical performance that involves Mr.Liu, Carol Yinghua Lu, and Marko Daniel, who is a long-term friend of Liu's and a curator, discussing the artistic and curatorial practice of Liu in the absence of the artist himself. This project continued in the Taipei Biennale 2012. In 2013, Liu was invited to give a lecture in Whitechapel Gallery in London as part of the "Artists as Curator" project. Little Movements II: Self-Practices in Contemporary Art, co-curated by Carol Yinghua Lu and Liu Ding, toured to Museion, Italy in 2013. In November 2013, Lu and Liu were both invited by Ruskin School of Art, Oxford University, to hold a conversation with Ros Homes. Liu also participated in BMW Tate Live in Tate Modern, London, where Almost Avante-garde was performed in the Performance Room, as well as being streamed live on the Internet without the live sounds.

In 2014, From the Issue of Art to the Issue of Position: The Echoes of Socialist Realism, a research and exhibition project (ongoing at present) was exhibited in Shenzhen OCT Contemporary Art Terminal. In April 2014, Liu's solo exhibition, Three Performances, was exhibited in Urs Meile Gallery, Beijing. At the same time, solo exhibition Lake Washington was shown in Antenna Space, Shanghai. A presentation by Liu Ding with a response by Boris Groys was held in Asia Art Archive in America on April 22, 2014. Liu participated in Prospect.3: Notes for Now in New Orleans, USA, and The 10th Shanghai Biennale. In December 2014, Liu was invited to give a lecture in Madison University, USA.

In January 2015, Liu participated in the research and preparation for the exhibition New Works #2 New Measurement and Qian Weikang: Two Case Studies in Early Chinese Conceptual Art. His solo exhibition, New Man, opened in April 2015 at MOT International, London.
