= Route 93 (Iceland) =

National road in the Eastern Region of Iceland

Coordinates: 65°15′34″N 14°13′30″W

Route 93

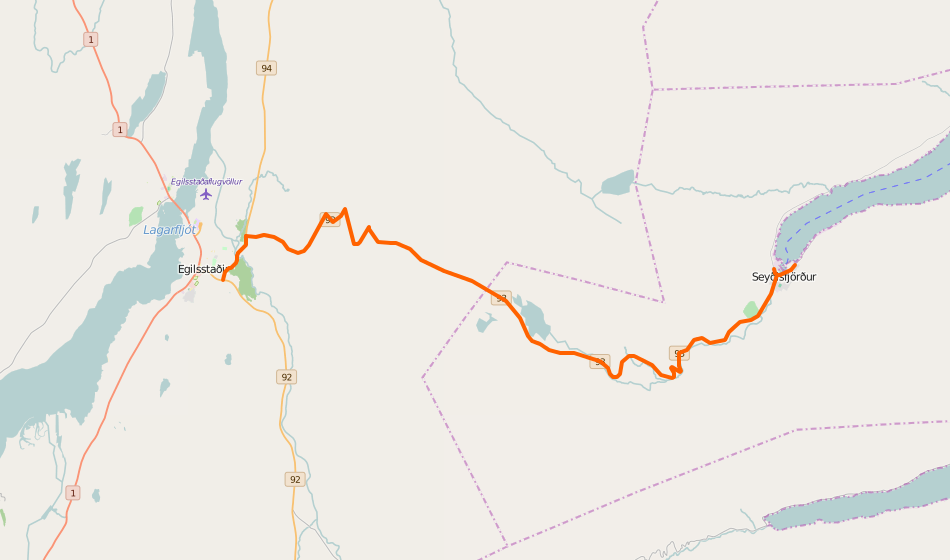
- Seyðisfjarðarvegur

Route information
- Length: 24 km (15 mi)

Major junctions
- Western end: Route 92 Egilsstaðir
- Eastern end: Seyðisfjörður

Location
- Country: Iceland

Highway system
- Roads in Iceland

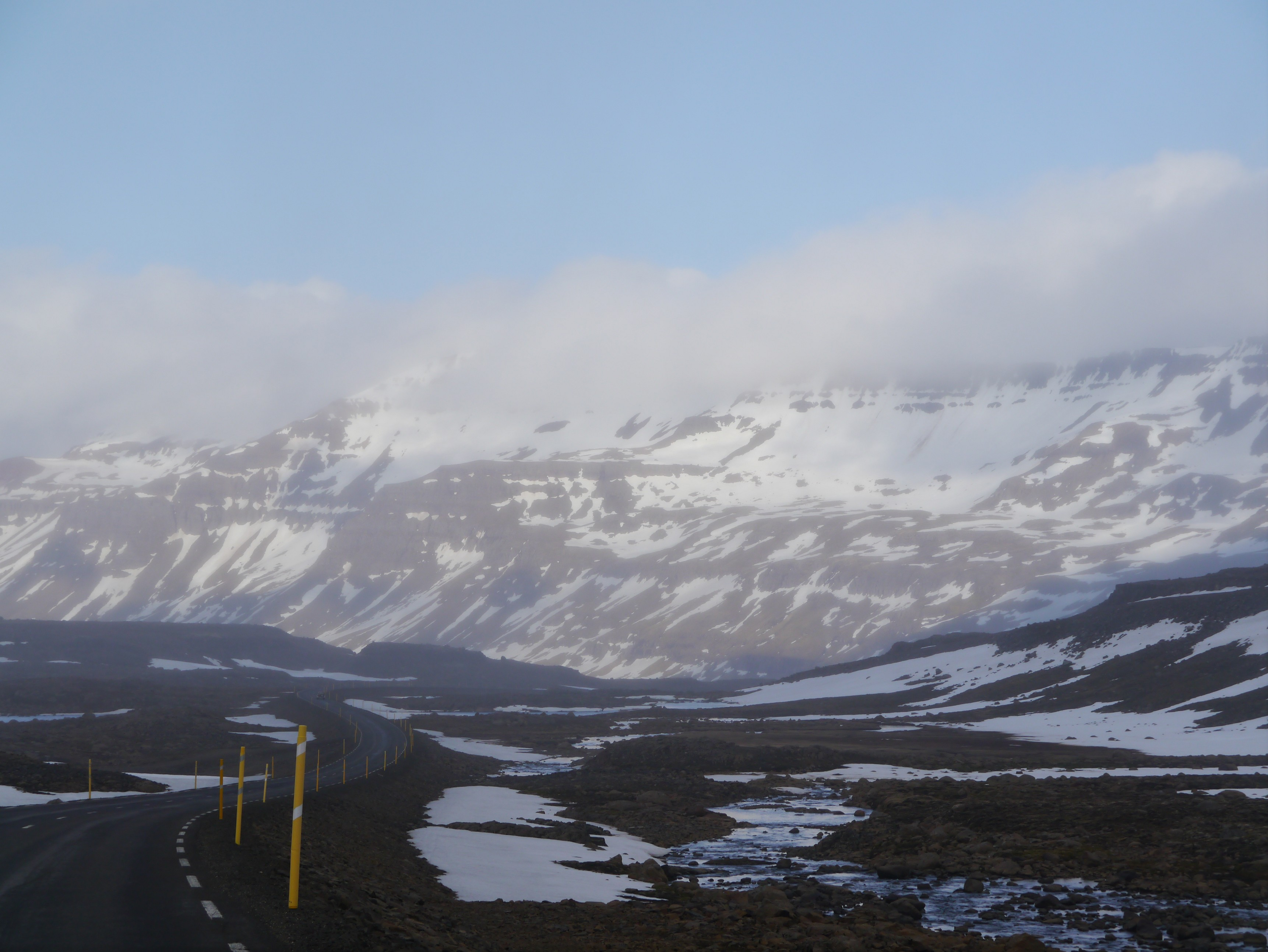
Route 93 (Iceland), over the mountain pass

Route 93 or Seyðisfjarðarvegur (lit. 'Seyðisfjörður Road') is a national road in the Eastern Region of Iceland. It connects the town of Seyðisfjörður at the coast with the town of Egilsstaðir at the Route 1.

In Seyðisfjörður, the only car ferry port in Iceland, which has international ferry operation, is located. This makes the road to have international significance. Smyril Line operates a weekly car ferry to Hirtshals in Denmark and Tórshavn in the Faroe Islands.

The road passes a mountain pass at an altitude of 600 metres (2,000 ft), and is one of the highest paved roads in Iceland. There are problems with snow storms in the winter, and there are suggestions to build a tunnel, called Fjarðarheiðargöng, under the mountain pass.
