= Ceal Floyer =

British visual artist (1968–2025)

- Born: Cecile Anne Floyer; 18 April 1968; Karachi, West Pakistan, Pakistan
- Died: 11 December 2025 (aged 57); Berlin, Germany
- Education: Goldsmiths College
- Occupation: Visual artist
- Awards: Nam June Paik Art Center (2009)

Cecile Anne "Ceal" Floyer (18 April 1968 – 11 December 2025) was a British conceptual and visual artist. She was based in Berlin, Germany.

== Life and career ==
Cecile Floyer was born in Karachi, then in West Pakistan, Pakistan, on 18 April 1968 and grew up in England. Floyer received a BFA degree from Goldsmiths College, in 1994. While studying, Floyer worked as a gallery invigilator, i.e. attendant.

In 1997, she relocated to Berlin to study at the Künstlerhaus Bethanien. The same year, she won the Philip Morris Prize. In 2007, she won the National Gallery Prize for Young Art, and in 2009, she won the Nam June Paik Art Center Prize.

In 2008, she exhibited ... 5 minutes later at the Kunst-Werke Institute for Contemporary Art and exhibited continuously thereafter. Her work is included in the permanent collections of the Tate Modern, the San Francisco Museum of Modern Art, and MoMA, among other art institutions.

Ceal Floyer died in Berlin on the morning of 11 December 2025, at the age of 57, after a long illness.

== Style ==
Floyer consistently engaged the discourse surrounding conceptual art, minimalism, post-minimalism, the ready-made, and technology within her work. Her work is often remarked upon for its visual austerity that stands in stark contrast to the abundant verbal implications and how it precipitates greater conjecture. For example, her work Bucket (1999) is a black bucket accompanied by the sound of a leak. However, if you look closely, there is a CD player inside the bucket, emitting the sound of the leak. Similarly, Matches (2010) is an artwork that places three boxes of matches on a shelf, a pun on whether or not the different boxes of matches "match". In a catalogue essay for her exhibition at the Kunsthalle Bern in 1999, Berhard Fibicher wrote:

Both Carousel and Bucket function like classical metaphors -- albeit not on a linguistic level (although the titles are often crucial to deciphering Ceal Floyer's picture puzzles), but at that of sensorial perception. The metaphor operates by conflating the distance between two objects, by revealing their similarity. Surprising similarities make us seek the characteristics shared by various objects. Floyer instrumentalised the distance between objects, or between the object and its name, reducing that distance so much by way of revealing similarity, that one object may become identical with another, or with its name.

== Publications ==
- Ceal Floyer. Exhibition catalogue. Ikon Gallery, Birmingham, UK 2002
- Ceal Floyer. Exhibition catalogue. X-rummet, Statens Museum for Kunst, Copenhagen, 2002
- Ceal Floyer. Exhibition catalogue. Contemporary Art Gallery, Vancouver, 2005
- Artificial Light: New Light-Based Sculpture and Installation Art. Exhibition catalogue. VCUArts Anderson Gallery, Richmond VA, 2006
- Ceal Floyer: Construction. Exhibition catalogue. Kunstmuseen Krefeld, 2007
- Auto Focus. Exhibition catalogue. Museum of Contemporary Art, North Miami, 2010
- Works on Paper. Exhibition catalogue. Center for Contemporary Art, Tel Aviv, 2011
- Ceal Floyer. Exhibition catalogue. Kölnischer Kunstverein, 2013
- Ceal Floyer. Exhibition catalogue. Museion Bolzano, 2014
- Ceal Floyer. A Handbook. Exhibition catalogue. Kunstmuseum Bonn and Aargauer Kunsthaus, 2015
