= Robert Adrian =

Canadian artist (1935–2015)

Robert Adrian (1935–2015), also known as Robert Adrian X, was a Canadian artist who made radio and telecommunications art. Adrian moved from Canada to Vienna, Austria in 1972 where he became known for creating experimental artworks using radio and communications technologies. His work The World in 24 Hours, which connected artists in different cities and continents through telephone lines and radio, is considered to be one of the first experiments in online culture. Adrian is considered to be a pioneer in the field of telecommunications art and media art.

== Life ==
Adrian was born in Toronto, Ontario, Canada on February 22, 1935. He moved to Vienna in 1972.

== Work ==
Adrian was an early user of telecommunications and electronics technologies for artistic purposes. One of his earliest telecommunications projects, in collaboration with Bill Bartlett, was a work that used the business computer network of the company I. P. Sharp Associates, which Adrian had learned about and gained access to through fellow artist Norman White. Called Interplay, the piece was a telecommunications event that linked a dozen cities in Canada, the US, Australia, Austria and Japan on April 1, 1979.

Following Interplay, Bartlett and Adrian organized and implemented of one of the first electronic mail systems for artists in 1979/1980. This again used the I. P. Sharp Associates computer network, this time from its Vienna office. Adrian was instrumental in setting up the system ARTBOX (later renamed to ARTEX) in 1979 for mail and media artists to use to communicate between each other.

In 1982, Adrian organized Die Welt in 24 Stunden (The World in 24 Hours), a telecommunications work that used telephone lines and slow-scan television to link sixteen cities on three continents together. The piece is widely cited as an early example of networked electronic art and online culture. It was commissioned by and presented at Ars Electronica Linz.

== Awards ==
In 2009, Adrian was a co-recipient of the US$50,000 Nam June Paik Art Center Prize.

== Death ==
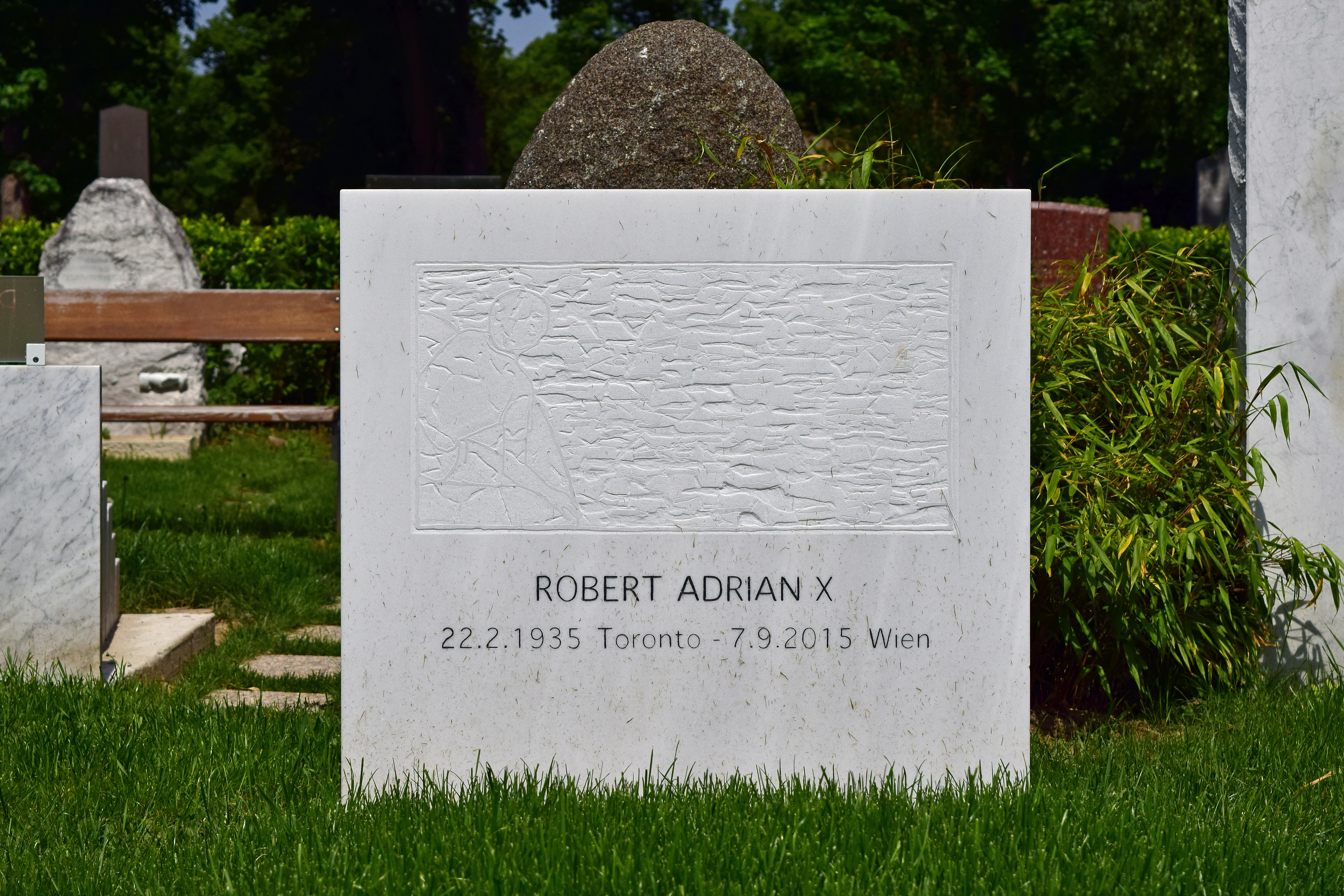
Grave of Robert Adrian

Adrian died in Vienna on September 7, 2015. At the time of his death, the Austrian minister of culture Josef Ostermayer called Adrian "einen Pionier der Medienkunst" (a pioneer of media art).

== See also ==
- Hank Bull
- Norman White
- Telematic art
- Radio art
- Electronic art
- Internet art
