= Skálanes =

Nature reserve in East Iceland

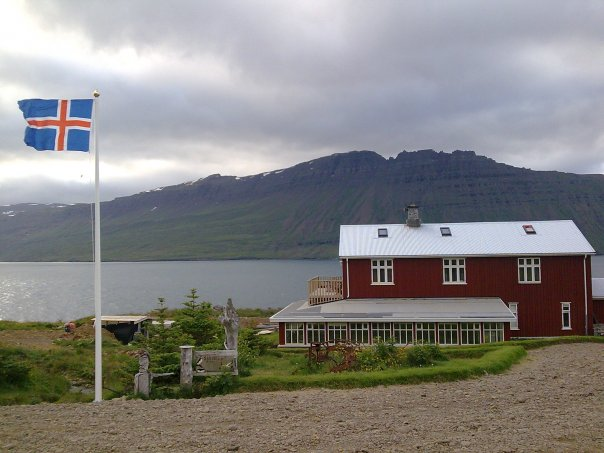
Skálanes Nature & Heritage Centre

Skálanes (Icelandic pronunciation: [ˈskauːlaˌnɛːs]) Nature and Heritage Centre is placed within a 1250 hectare nature reserve situated on a peninsula 17 km east of Seyðisfjörður, East Iceland. The reserve has a rich natural and historical life consisting of native plants, a wide range of wildlife consisting of 47 different bird species, local reindeer herds, arctic foxes, and more than 80 archaeological sites.

Skálanes works as an independent, non-profit natural science research station and a member of INTERACT - International Network for Terrestrial Research and Monitoring in the Arctic. Skálanes is collaborating with a wide range of International and Icelandic researchers and natural science institutes, hosting week-long excursions for university students and professors, developing educational material for young learners, and engaging with non-scientific communities and crowds offering guided hikes and talks on the local landscape and the natural fauna. The intention of Skálanes is to create an experimental platform for scientific, social and cultural exploration focusing on practical solutions in sustainability and species diversity.

Today, Skálanes is collaborating with educational institutions such as: Southern Connecticut State University, Earlham College, Liverpool John Moores University, Wellesley College and University of Glasgow, providing the foundation for a variety of research topics in the fields of natural history, biology, archaeology, anthropology, conservation and ecology.

== Location ==
Skálanes is located 17 km to the east of the town of Seyðisfjörður in eastern Iceland at 65° 18' 0" North, 13° 43' 0" West.

== The Reserve ==
The reserve is roughly 1250 ha in size. The site is bounded by the sea on the north and east and by a continuation of similar land to the south and west. The majority of the land slopes from the skyline (945m) in the south to the sea at the northern edge of the reserve. The coastline along the northern edge of the reserve makes up the southern side of the mouth of the fjord called Seyðisfjorður, whilst the eastern section of coastline consists of sheer sea cliffs reaching up to 600 meters in height.

Below is list of the main habitat types found in the reserve:

- Marine
- Intertidal- rocky sea shore and pebble beach
- Cliffs
- Riparian
- Fresh water wetlands- pools, scrapes, flushes, bogs
- Wet pasture
- Meadow
- Dwarf scrub/woodland communities
- Scree slopes
- Bare ground
- Various stages of successional habitats found upon eroded soils

This wealth of habitats provide niches for a wide variety of life. There are at least 150 species of plants, 47 bird species and the 4 Icelandic mammals.

== Example of collaboration ==
=== The University of Glasgow ===
The Exploration Society (ExSoc) at the University of Glasgow supports young minds to travel, explore and research new environments. The first Iceland Expedition to Skálanes was set up in 2008 and since then a group of around six students has spent the summer months carrying out both individual and group research projects around the reserve. Skálanes provides a landscape and environment ideal for the development of research skills in a broad range of disciplines.

==== Past Projects ====
- The impact of Alaskan Lupin on ground nesting birds
- Topographical surveys of archaeological sites
- Distribution and shell colour of periwinkles
- The impact of nature based tourism on environmental awareness
- The breeding success of fulmars, kittiwakes and Arctic terns
- The distribution, size and abundance of microplastics

==== Planning ====
The Iceland Expedition is an entirely student-led trip, with each team member having an individual role within the group. The expedition team work in conjunction with Skálanes director Ólafur Örn Pétursson in order to arrange research projects that will both benefit the University of Glasgow and the Skálanes Reserve. The planning process begins in early October with the expedition beginning in the summer the following year. A full report of each expedition is published in the University of Glasgow Library.

Many of the expeditions to Skálanes have had financial support from charitable institutions including: Royal Geographical Society, Glasgow Natural History Society and Gilchrist Educational Trust. The expedition is also financed by private fundraising and personal contribution.

== Projects at Skálanes ==
There are many long term projects that are currently being undertaken in the reserve.

=== Turf wall / -building construction ===
The method of using turf for creating boundaries and structures can be seen in many places throughout Iceland and is being used at Skálanes due to its heritage significance and unobtrusiveness when placed in natural environments. The work entails cutting and stacking turf in two lines and filling the centre with soil. The turf is overlapped in each layer similar to bricks in a house and tied together with pieces of turf which bridge the central cavity. The top is then capped with large pieces of turf.

=== Path work ===
Essential to present and future visitor management is the creation and upkeep of various paths within the reserve. Staff are currently designing a specification for path construction and starting to lay paths in the most heavily used areas of the reserve.

=== Re-forestation ===
Skálanes has an ambitious re-forestation plan covering 111 ha of the site. The tree species used in these plantings are predominantly birch, rowan and willow all of which are Icelandic native species. Various planting methods are being trialed and monitored so that planting efforts are well targeted and efficient. One of the largest areas of planting is located in an area where many fragments of relic woodland and associated ground flora remain. Supplementary planting in this area will hopefully accelerate the process of natural regeneration and encourage the remaining scrubby trees to expand into contiguous woodland.

=== Lupin control ===
In recent years there has been some debate surrounding the Nootka lupin (Lupinus nootkatensis) in Iceland. An introduced species used to combat soil erosion, lupin grows well on exposed, eroded soil areas however there is growing concern that in some places it is creeping away unchecked and out competing the native flora which consists of many delicate herbs, wild flowers, grasses and sedges. The lupin at Skálanes is being studied using various methods to help develop a landscape scale plan for the control and removal of this plant. It appears from direct observation within the reserve that there is a considerable loss of biodiversity in the areas that surround the lupin as it encroaches upon and out competes with other species.

=== Stone wall construction ===
Using a specification written by a Scottish volunteer from a previous student excursion, the Skálanes staff use stone from the surroundings to create boundary walls and walls for various structures.

=== Sustainable agriculture ===
The staff are increasingly looking at making Skálanes more sustainable and is therefore introducing low-impact agriculture to the area around the centre such as vegetable garden and rearing chickens and pigs.

=== Monitoring & Survey Work ===
Monitoring and survey work is an important part of the conservation work at Skálanes. There are a wide variety of bird and plant species on the reserve which staff and volunteers surveys and monitor each year.
