= SS El Grillo =

Coordinates: 65.15°N 13.60°W

History

United Kingdom
- Name: El Grillo
- Operator: The Bowring Steamship Co., Liverpool
- Builder: Armstrong W. G. & Whitworth Co. Ltd., Newcastle
- Yard number: 974
- Launched: 2 November 1921
- Completed: January 1922
- Fate: Sunk after German air raid, 10 February 1944

General characteristics
- Type: Merchant vessel
- Tonnage: 7,264 GRT
- Length: 134.3 m (440 ft 7 in)
- Beam: 17.5 m (57 ft 5 in)
- Propulsion: steam engines
- Speed: 10 knots (19 km/h; 12 mph)
- Complement: 49
- Armament: 4 × Oerlikon 20 mm air defence cannons; 1 × 4-inch gun; 1 × 12-pounder high-angle quick-fire gun

SS El Grillo was a British oil tanker sunk without casualties by a German air attack at Seyðisfjörður, Iceland on 10 February 1944.

Iceland, which remained neutral during World War II, had been occupied by Britain in May 1940 and, in April 1941, by the United States.

"El Grillo" is Spanish for "The Cricket".

== History ==
The steam ship El Grillo was built in 1922 at Armstrong W. G. & Whitworth Co. Ltd., Newcastle-Upon-Tyne and operated by The Bowring Steamship Co., based at Liverpool.

On 10 February 1944, the ship was at anchor at Seyðisfjörður, carrying a cargo of bunker oil. The ship was armed, being a Defensively Equipped Merchant Vessel, and carried anti-aircraft guns and depth charges.

While at anchor, the ship was attacked by three German Focke-Wulf Fw 200 "Condor"s from the I./KG 40, stationed in occupied Norway, and heavily damaged. The captain of El Grillo decided to scuttle the ship to prevent it and other ships at Seyðisfjörður from becoming more of a target.

== Wreck ==
The wreck of El Grillo remains at the bottom of the fjord at Seyðisfjörður, in a depth between 22 and 45 metres, lying more or less completely upright. It is one of the most popular diving spots in Iceland.

The wreck continued to leak oil up until the 2000s, when a Norwegian contractor was hired to dispose of the estimated 2,000 tonnes of oil remaining in the ship, which was carried out in 2002. At the same time, unexploded ordnance was also to be removed from the ship. The Icelandic Coast Guard, however, assumed that many of the more accessible shells had already been removed by scuba divers.

In spite of attempts to render the wreck non-hazardous for wildlife, oil continues to leak from it, most recently observed in August 2021.

== El Grillo beer ==
Eyþór Þórisson, a restaurant owner in Seyðisfjörður, began brewing a beer after his own recipe in the mid-2000s which he named after the sunken tanker El Grillo. The front label of the bottle features a picture of the sinking ship while the back side label tells the story of the sinking of the tanker.
