= BANK (art collective) =

BANK was an artists' group active in London during the 1990s. Simon Bedwell and David Burrows were involved with it.

BANK also published a satirical magazine delivering tabloid-style critiques of the art world. Headlines included, "AD MAN YOU’RE A BAD MAN," and, "GALLERIES 'ALL OWNED BY RICH PEOPLE' SHOCK." Other "frankly adolescent" headlines were "ARSE COUNCIL", "SIMON PATTERSON – ONE IDEA, EIGHT YEARS", "CARRY ON CURATING", "PIPPA-LOTTA-RIST-ACTION" and "SAM-TAYLOR WOULD-NOT"

Julian Stallabrass said BANK's activity was "the parodic creation of corporate identity at the centre of which (as their name suggests) is a noisy and constant reference to that matter of which the art world usually whispers: money." They had, according to Matthew Collings, a "surly, self-destructive, self-conscious, introspective attitude – combined...with critical intelligence and a flair for spotting weaknesses in the art system".
