= LungA School =

Coordinates: 65.2714°N 13.9832°W

- LungA Skólinn
- Seyðisfjörður; Iceland

Information
- Type: Art school and folk high school
- Established: 2013
- Director: Mark Rohtmaa-Jackson
- Website: www.lungaschool.is

LungA School is an artist-run residential art school based in Seyðisfjörður, East Iceland that offers programs in Art and Land. Constituted and regulated as an Icelandic folk school, LungA School is often also understood as being an artwork, artistic practice, or a performance lasting 84 days, that uses the idea of schooling as its medium or form.

== History ==
Inspired by anarchist pedagogies, the school grew out of the LungA Art Festival, and was founded by Danish artist Jonatan Spejlborg Juelsbo and Icelandic artist and musician Björt Sigfinnsdóttir, the festival's co-founder and director. Like the festival before it, the school's name is a portmanteau of the Icelandic words 'lista' (art), 'ungur' (young) and 'Austurlandi' (East).

The school was formalized in 2013 with the first program launching in 2014, and is one of three folk high schools in Iceland, joined by Lýðháskólinn á Flateyri in 2017 and Hússtjórnarskólinn í Reykjavík in 2025. It takes applicants aged 18 years and over from around the world.

Programs at the school were originally named '84' after the number of days of their duration. In early 2024 the school started a Land program focused on ideas of land, environment and ecology, with 84 renamed as the Art program. Also in 2024, the school announced they were starting a Radio School to take place entirely on-air from February 2025.

== Facilities ==
Many of LungA School's buildings and facilities are co-opted from local industry, either occupying spaces underused outside of Seyðisfjörður's busy tourist season or redeveloping spaces vacated by changes to the local fishing industry. Part of the school is also based in the Herðubreið Community and Culture House, upstairs from the Herðubíó, East Iceland's only cinema and host to the Flat Earth Film Festival, an annual film festival of experimental art film.

Since 2016 the school has been the host to an experimental community radio station, Seyðisfjörður Community Radio. In early 2024, Seyðisfjörður Community Radio became part of the Lithuania-based Independent Community Radio Network.

== Administration ==
American British artist and curator Mark Rohtmaa-Jackson was hired as the new director of the school in October 2023, although the school aims for collaborative and decentralised organisational practices.
