= Mark Peter Wright =

British sound artist

Mark Peter Wright (born 1979) is a British sound artist who works with field recording and phonography. "His work addresses listening and the environment and seeks to amplify, illuminate and interrogate notions of place and experience."

He studied at the London College of Communication, University of the Arts London, London and Manchester Metropolitan University and has exhibited and broadcast works internationally including Flat Time House, London, Barbican Centre, London, Queen Elisabeth Hall, South Bank Centre, London, Royal Opera House, London, and on BBC Radio 3 and Resonance FM.

In 2009 Wright was awarded the BASCA British Composer Award in Sonic Art for his work A Quiet Reverie an "audio exploration of site, time, perception and landscape" focused upon the monastic abbeys in North Yorkshire.

Wright is also founder and editor of Ear Room, an online publication for developing critical discourse and debate on the creative, and explorative use of sound in artistic practice, and including interviews with relevant contributors to sound arts such as Hildegard Westerkamp and Janek Schaefer.

Recent work includes Where Once We Walked a series of five compositions created in collaboration with Trevor Avery and Chris Atkins from the arts charity Another Space to reflect the lives of the Windermere Boys, several hundred orphaned Jewish boys sent to the Lake District to recover from their internment in Auschwitz. He is currently working on an ongoing series of work about the reclaimed land of South Gare in North Yorkshire where he spent his childhood.
