= David Burrows (commissioner) =

Northern Ireland Parades commissioner

David Burrows is a member in the Northern Ireland Parades Commission, a quasi-judicial body set up in 1997 to make determinations on annual Orangemen Parades. He resigned from his position as the Deputy District Master of the Portadown Orangemen Lodge in 2006, which was at the centre of the decade-long Drumcree dispute. He left the Orange Order in accordance with legal advice he sought after Nationalist residents in Portadown challenged the Secretary of States' decision to appoint Burrows and another Orangeman, Don McKay, onto the Parades Commission.
