= Simon Bedwell =

English artist (born 1963)

Simon Bedwell (born 1963 in Croydon, Surrey) is an English artist based in London.

== Career ==
Bedwell has had solo shows The Furnishers at White Columns in New York City, Galleon and Other Stories at the Saatchi Gallery in London, England Their England at Laden fur Nichts in Leipzig, Beck's Futures 2004 at the ICA in London and the CCA in Glasgow, Cell Project Space,

He spent most of his art career as a member of the London-based collective BANK.
