= Sykur =

Icelandic band

Sykur (Sugar in Icelandic) is an Icelandic band, which was founded in 2008.

Mesópótamía, released in Iceland in 2011, was the band's second album. Their single "Curling" was remixed by Dan Le Sac and Database.

== Discography ==
=== Albums ===
- 2009: Frábært eða frábært
- 2011: Mesópótamía
- 2019: JÁTAKK

=== Singles ===
- 2011: "Shed Those Tears"
- 2014: "Strange Loop"
- 2018: "Loving none"
