= Kauffman Stadium =

Baseball stadium in Kansas City, Missouri

- The K

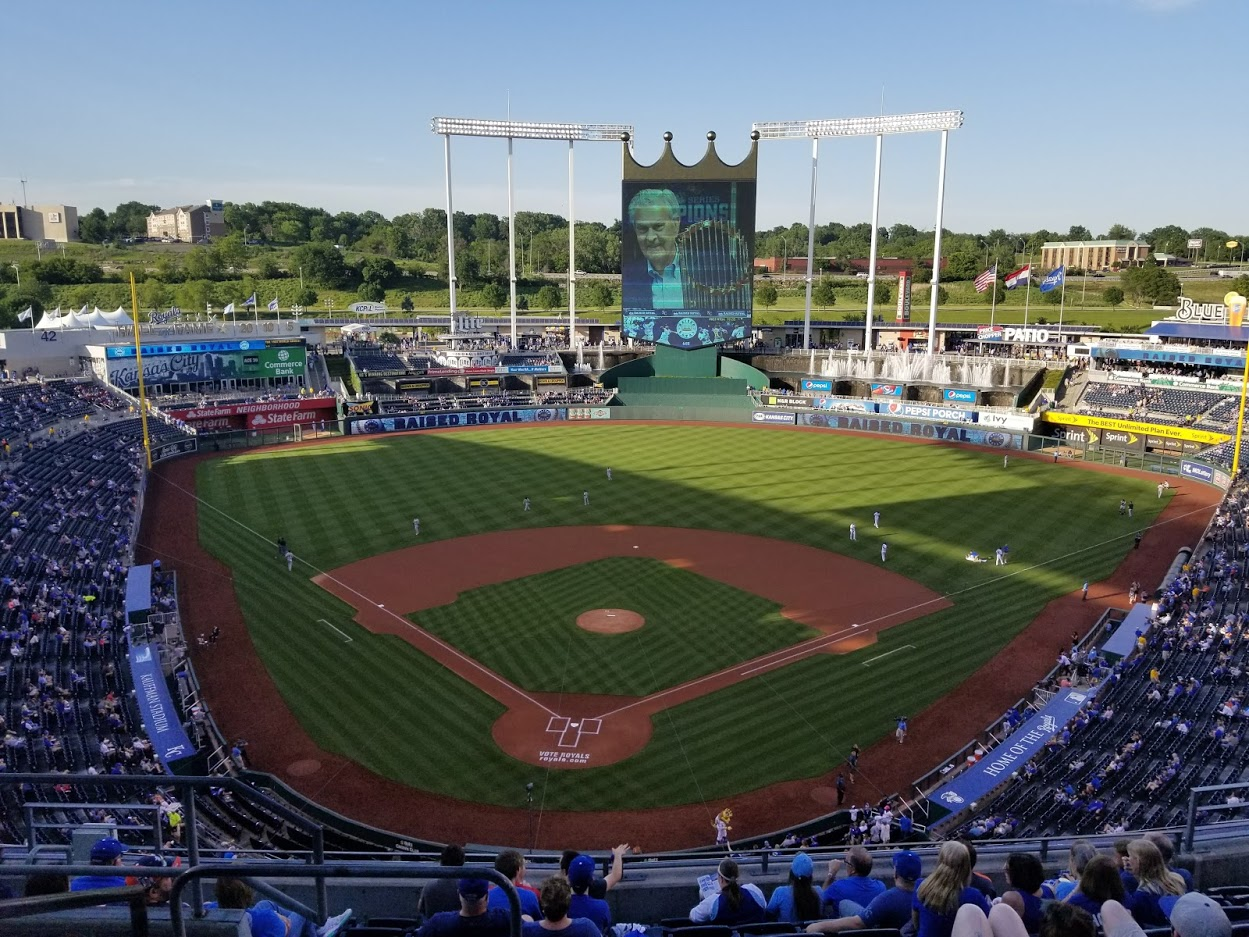
- Kauffman Stadium in 2017

- Location within the United States Location within Missouri
- Former names: Royals Stadium (1973–1993)
- Address: 1 Royal Way
- Location: Kansas City, Missouri, U.S.
- Coordinates: 39°03′05″N 94°28′50″W
- Elevation: 750 feet (230 m) AMSL
- Operator: Jackson Sports Complex Authority
- Capacity: 38,053 (2026–present); 37,903 (2012–2025); 37,840 (2010–2011); 40,785 (2005–2009); 40,793 (2003–2004); 40,625 (1973-2002)
- Surface: Kentucky bluegrass / Perennial ryegrass (1995–present); AstroTurf (1973–1994)
- Record attendance: 42,633 (ALCS Game 2, October 9, 1980, vs. New York Yankees)
- Field size: Left Field – 330 ft (101 m); Left-Center – 385 ft (117 m) (1973-1994); 375 ft (114 m) (1995–2003); 385 ft (117 m) (2004–2008); 387 ft (118 m) (2009–2025); 379 ft (116 m) (2026-present); Center Field – 410 ft (125 m) (1973–1994); 400 ft (122 m) (1995–2003); 410 ft (125 m) (2004–present); Right-Center – 385 ft (117 m) (1973–1994); 375 ft (114 m) (1995–2003); 385 ft (117 m) (2004–2008); 387 ft (118 m) (2009–2025); 379 ft (116 m) (2026–present); Right Field – 330 ft (101 m); Backstop – 60 ft (18 m) (1973–present)
- Public transit: KCATA: Route 47

Construction
- Groundbreaking: July 11, 1968; 58 years ago
- Opened: April 10, 1973; 53 years ago
- Renovated: 2007–2009
- Cost: $70 million ($508 million in 2025) $250 million (2007–10 renovations) ($369 million in 2025)
- Architects: Kivett and Myers [HNTB] Populous (renovations 1997, 2009, 2025)
- Structural engineers: Bob D. Campbell & Co. Structural Engineers
- General contractor: Sharp-Kidde-Webb JV

Tenants
- Kansas City Royals (MLB) (1973–present)

Website
- mlb.com/royals/ballpark

Kauffman Stadium (/ˈkɔːfmən/) (nicknamed "The K") is a ballpark located in Kansas City, Missouri, and the home of Major League Baseball's Kansas City Royals. It is next door to Arrowhead Stadium, home of the National Football League's Kansas City Chiefs. Both make up the Truman Sports Complex. The stadium is named for Ewing Kauffman, the founder and first owner of the Royals. It opened in 1973 as Royals Stadium and was named for Kauffman 20 years later on July 2, 1993. Since its last major renovation in 2009, its listed seating capacity is 37,903.

Kauffman Stadium was built specifically for baseball during an era when building multisport "cookie-cutter" stadiums was commonplace. It is often held up along with Dodger Stadium (1962) in Los Angeles as one of the best examples of modernist ballpark design. It is currently the only stadium in the American League to be named after a person and is also one of eight stadiums in Major League Baseball that does not have a corporate-sponsored name. The stadium is the fifth-oldest stadium in the majors and has hosted the 1973 and the 2012 MLB All-Star Games, along with Royals home games during the 1980, 1985, 2014, and 2015 World Series. Between 2007 and 2009, Kauffman Stadium underwent a $250 million renovation, which included updates and upgrades in fan amenities, a new Royals hall of fame area, and other updates throughout the facility.

In 2022, the Royals announced intentions to build and open a new stadium before the team's lease agreement with Jackson County expires at the end of the 2030 MLB season. In 2024, the team announced its intention for the stadium to be located in downtown Kansas City's Crossroads district. The plan would involve displacing several small businesses that would be in the footprint of the stadium. In April 2024, Jackson County voters overwhelmingly rejected a ballot initiative to help fund the new stadium by a 16% margin. A financial analysis of the new stadium plans estimates that the cost to taxpayers would be between $4.4 billion and $6.4 billion. As of June 2024, the team was considering relocating to Kansas City, Kansas. In April 2026, the Royals and Hallmark Cards announced that a new ballpark and entertainment district would be built at Crown Center near downtown Kansas City.

== History ==
In 1967, voters in Jackson County approved the bonds for the Truman Sports Complex, which replaced the multipurpose Municipal Stadium and featured a football stadium for the Kansas City Chiefs and a baseball stadium for the Kansas City Athletics. The owner of the Athletics, Charles O. Finley, had just signed a new lease to remain in Kansas City. The proposal of the Truman Sports Complex was unusual, as conventional wisdom at the time held that separate football and baseball stadiums were not commercially viable. Before the 1968 season, however, Finley moved the A's to Oakland, California, and their brand-new multipurpose stadium.

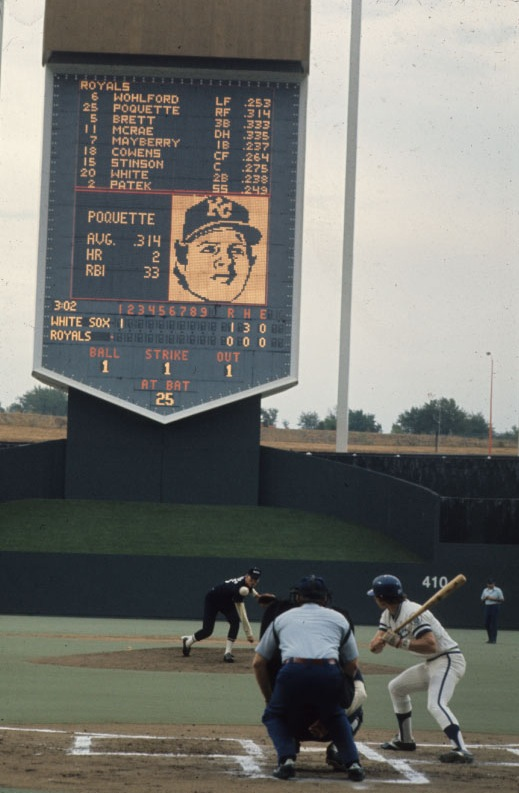
Chris Knapp of the White Sox pitches to outfielder Tom Poquette on September 19, 1976.

After the move, Senator Stuart Symington of Missouri threatened to press for the revocation of baseball's antitrust exemption if they did not give Kansas City a new team. Major League Baseball responded by hastily granting expansion franchises to four cities, including a Kansas City team owned by local pharmaceutical magnate Ewing Kauffman. The new teams were due to start to play in 1971. However, Symington forced MLB to move up the start date to 1969, as he was unwilling to have Kansas City wait three years to have baseball again. The other expansion team in the American League, the Seattle Pilots, were without a suitable stadium in 1969 and the accelerated schedule forced by Symington led to their bankruptcy after just one season. In 1970, they relocated to Milwaukee, Wisconsin, as the Milwaukee Brewers. With lawsuits pending, Seattle returned to the majors with the Mariners in 1977.

Jackson County continued its plans to build a new ballpark. Like the rest of the complex, it was designed by Kivett and Myers, and constructed by the joint venture of the Sharp, Kidde, and Webb construction firms. Royals Stadium broke ground on July 11, 1968, and was opened in on April 10, 1973, with a 12–1 win over the Texas Rangers that had 39,464 fans in attendance. Five weeks later, Nolan Ryan of the California Angels threw the first of his seven no-hitters, blanking the Royals 3–0, three walks away from a perfect game. Two months later on July 24, the stadium hosted the first of its two All-Star Games.

Following the 1976 regular season, the Royals competed in the first postseason game of their history on October 9, but lost 4–1 at home to the New York Yankees in the ALCS. The Royals won the next game 6–3 on October 10 for their first postseason win in Royals Stadium.

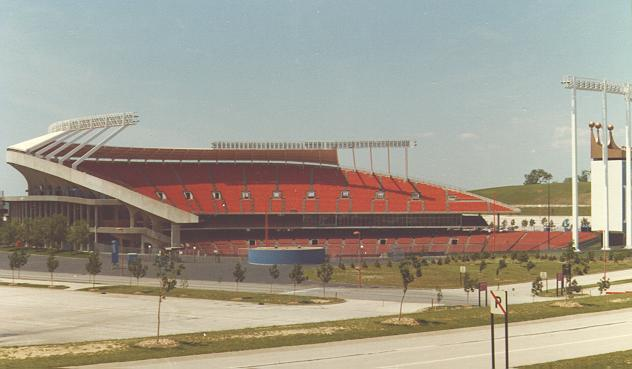
View of the stadium in 1981

The first World Series game held in Kansas City was on October 17, 1980, against the Philadelphia Phillies. In the first inning, George Brett hit a home run down the right field line, and the Royals recorded their first-ever World Series win, 4–3 in 10 innings, but lost the Series in six games.

On October 11, 1985, in Game 3 of the ALCS, Brett hit two home runs off Toronto Blue Jays pitcher Doyle Alexander, made a back-handed stop at third base to throw out a runner at home, and recorded the final out to give the Royals a much-needed 6–5 win. The Royals went on to win the American League pennant in seven games.

Two weeks later, on October 27, the Royals clinched their first World Series title in franchise history, winning Game 7 in Royals Stadium. Led by the pitching of Bret Saberhagen, Darryl Motley's two-run home run, and George Brett's four hits, the Royals beat the St. Louis Cardinals 11–0; Motley caught the title-clinching out. The Royals were the first team in the history of the World Series to lose the first two games of the series at home and come back to win.

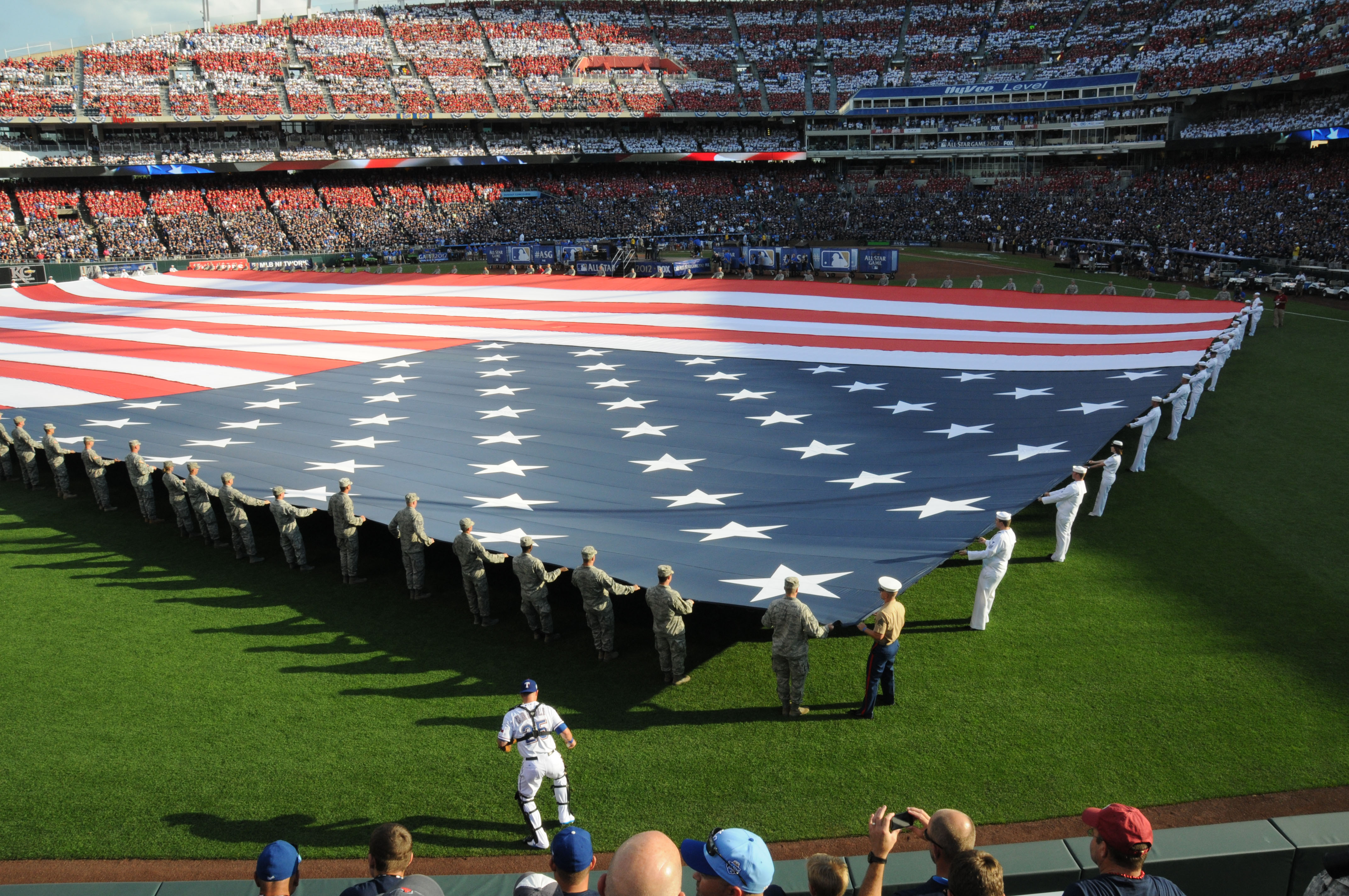
View of the stadium during the National Anthem at the 2012 All-Star Game

In 2012, the stadium hosted its second All-Star Game, which the National League won 8–0.

The stadium hosted the Royals' first playoff game in nearly 29 years when the city's former team, the Athletics, came to town in 2014 for the Wild Card Game. Despite trailing 7–3 in the eighth inning, Kansas City rallied to win 9-8 and advanced to the ALDS. They won their ALDS, the ALCS, and hosted Games 1, 2, 6, and 7 of the World Series, but fell to the San Francisco Giants.

In 2015, Kansas City returned to the playoffs, this time as the top seed in the American League. Games 1, 2, and 5 of the ALDS against the Houston Astros were played at the stadium, with the Royals winning Games 2 and 5, as well as Games 1, 2, and 6 of the ALCS against the Toronto Blue Jays, with the Royals winning all three games. The stadium hosted games 1 and 2 of the World Series against the New York Mets as a result of the American League winning the All-Star Game 6–3. The Royals won Game 1 (5–4 in 14 innings) and game 2 (7–1), as well and closed out the Mets in five games to win the 2015 World Series.

== Future ==
In 2020, Kansas City-based design firm Populous unveiled a concept for a potential new downtown baseball stadium, showing an intimate facility with unique amenities.

=== 2022 ===
In November 2022, team owner John Sherman announced the franchise's controversial intention to leave Kauffman Stadium before the lease ends after the 2030 MLB season and build a new stadium either in the East Village area of downtown, or in North Kansas City, an enclaved northern suburb located across the Missouri River in Clay County.

=== 2024 ===
In April 2024, Jackson County rejected a ballot initiative to extend the Royals' pre-existing 3/8-cent sales tax for Kauffman Stadium to build a new stadium in the Crossroads district in downtown Kansas City near the intersection of 16th and McGee streets (south of T-Mobile Center) with over 58% of voters against. The ballot also included funding renovations to Arrowhead Stadium.

The plan was controversial, considering the proposed stadium location would displace over a dozen small businesses, the limited amount of parking downtown, and claims that Kauffman got a “bad batch of concrete” when built. The Royals had pledged to invest at least $1 billion towards purchasing and developing land around the stadium, but was only willing to put $300 million towards a new ballpark.

Shortly after the vote, John Sherman's wife Marny criticized the results, stating, “The lack of leadership has lost the city two treasured assets. I mean if you don’t support the Chiefs after three Super Bowl wins, why would they stay? We will be lucky if both teams wind up in Kansas.” No more Jackson County for sure': Wife of Royals owner reacts to election results The stadium would have a seating capacity of about 34,000.

On June 8, 2024, Sam Mellinger, the Royals' vice president of communications, said that the team is evaluating "all options that may be available with respect to a new stadium," and pointed to the Kansas Legislature's upcoming vote to make changes to the state's Sales Tax and Revenue (STAR) bonds program to attract major sports teams to the state.

In August 2024, The Kansas City Star reported that the Royals were considering a new site for a downtown ballpark in Washington Square Park, an area located between Union Station and Crown Center.

In November 2024, the Royals reportedly were also examining "two or three" potential stadium sites in Johnson County, Kansas.

=== 2025-2026 ===
In May 2025, an affiliate of the Royals purchased the mortgage on the Aspiria campus in Overland Park, Kansas. However, team officials denied that the campus was under consideration as a site for the development of a stadium. In January 2026, the Royals confirmed that the team was no longer considering the Aspiria Campus as an option.

On January 1, 2026, Kansas House Speaker Dan Hawkins advised that the state of Kansas said the door was essentially closed in creating a STAR Bonds deal to build the Royals a stadium in Kansas. "The Royals and the Chiefs both had plenty of time," Hawkins said. "They had 18 months to come up with a good plan. The Chiefs did that. The Royals did not."

On January 7, 2026, Clay County Commissioner Jason Withington said that he ended negotiations with the team referring to it as “a closed chapter.” Withington cited a number of reasons including missed deadlines by the Royals.

On April 22, 2026, the Royals and Hallmark Cards announced a partnership to build a new ballpark and entertainment district at Crown Center near downtown Kansas City, at the current location of Hallmark's corporate headquarters. This has been met with extensive backlash from fans.

== Features ==
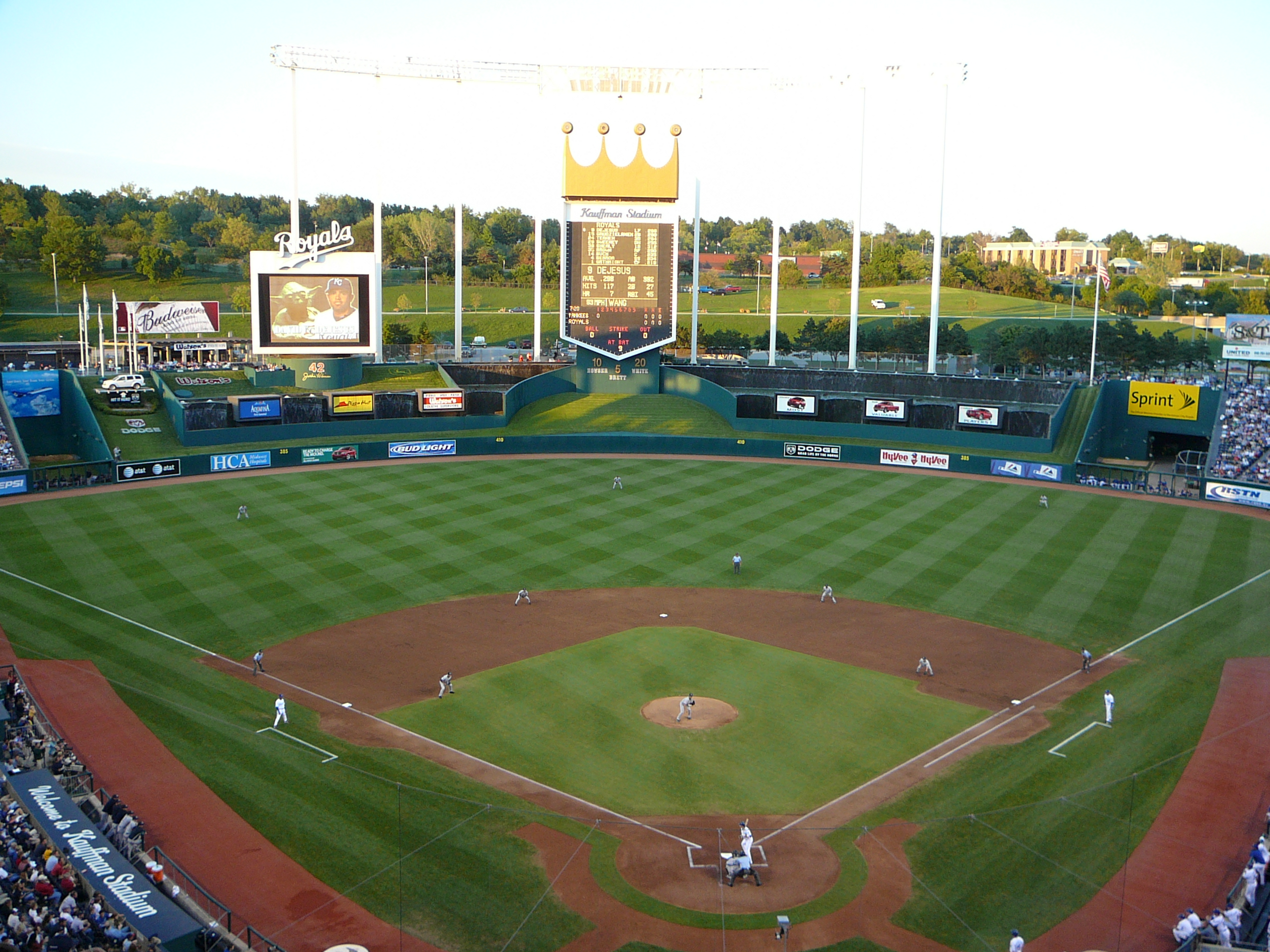
Kauffman Stadium as it appeared prior to 2009 renovations

Kauffman Stadium was the only baseball-only park built in the majors (not counting temporary facilities) from 1966 to 1991. It was one of the few baseball-only facilities built in the majors during the heyday of the cookie-cutter stadium era, and is one of two such facilities (with Dodger Stadium) that are still active and were never converted for use as multipurpose stadiums.^{1} Although a baseball-only facility, its design took several stylistic cues from the multipurpose stadiums of the day, plus the Googie style that was more prevalent in the decades prior. The main stadium itself is primarily concrete, with a smooth, uncovered concrete facade. The stands wrap around the infield and end at the foul poles, with smaller bleacher sections (or "outfield plazas", as the Royals call them) in the outfield. In their book, The Ultimate Baseball Road Trip, Josh Pahigian and Kevin O'Connell wrote that it is essentially one-third of a cookie-cutter stadium, containing only the seats in a cookie-cutter stadium that provide the best views for baseball. The upper deck is quite steep, though not as high as other parks built during this time. Many minor-league stadiums built in the 1980s and early 1990s, as well as Rate Field in Chicago, employ a similar design. The park's best-known feature is the fountain and waterfall display (known as the Water Spectacular) behind the right-field fence. At 322 feet (98 m), it is the largest privately funded fountain in the world. The fountains are on display before and after the game and between innings, while the waterfalls are constantly flowing.

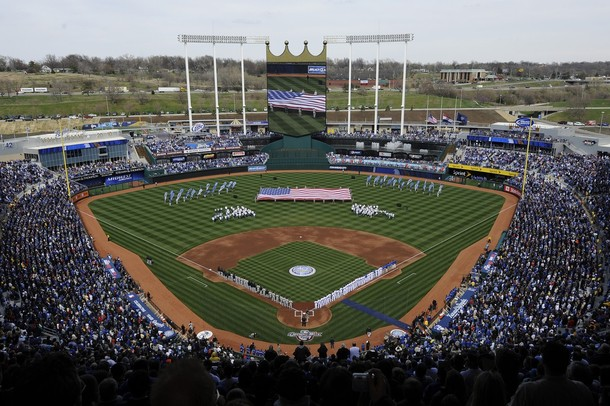
The newly renovated stadium on opening day 2009

When the stadium was originally built, Kansas City was the westernmost major league city other than those along the Pacific Coast (1,600 miles (2,600 km) away), which was a major reason why the Royals initially decided to use a faster-draining AstroTurf surface. Before the Colorado Rockies expansion franchise began play in Denver, Colorado, in the 1993 Major League Baseball season, the Royals' "home" territory included the Rocky Mountains in addition to a large swath of the Great Plains, and Kauffman didn't want fans who drove many hundreds of miles to go home without seeing games completed. The Truman Sports Complex's legendary groundskeeper, George Toma, best known as the head groundskeeper for the first 57 Super Bowls, thus had the job of maintaining two carpets for most of his career. He also maintained the surface at Arrowhead Stadium, which had AstroTurf from 1972 through 1993. However, Toma has said that artificial turf requires a good deal of maintenance as well; his crews were able to keep Royals Stadium's original carpet for two decades, somewhat longer than the typical lifetime for outdoor artificial turf. The original surface's longevity was also assisted by the venue being exclusively used for baseball, avoiding the wear and tear of football, soccer, concerts and other civic events which utilized Arrowhead Stadium instead.

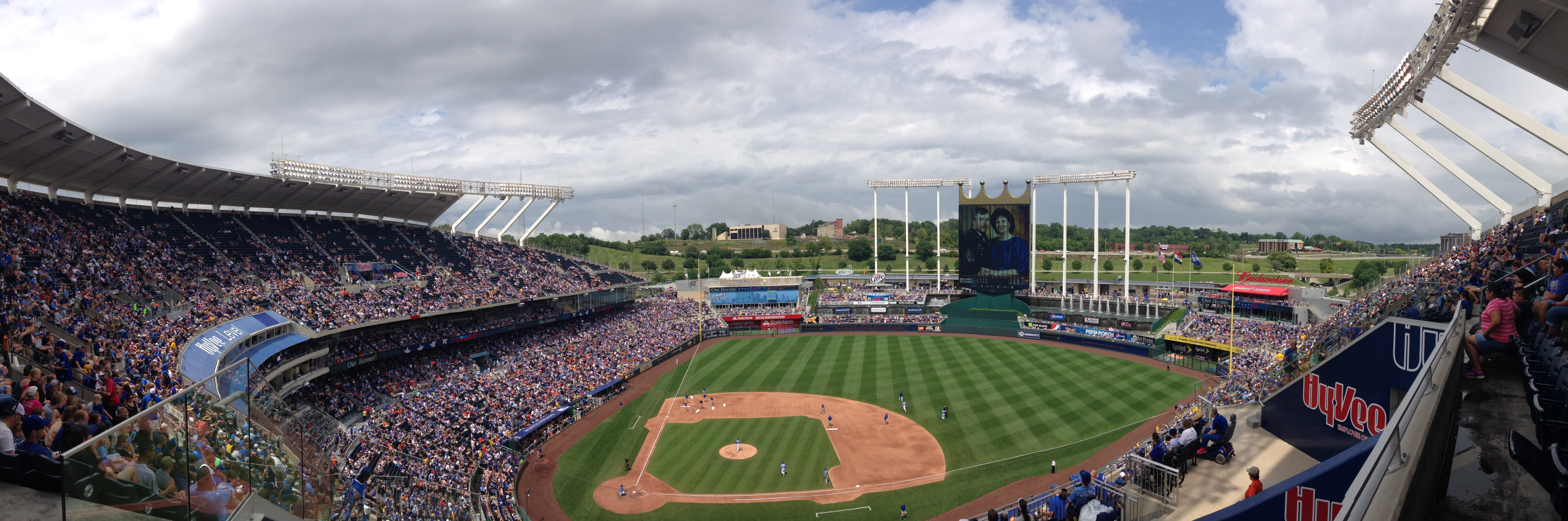
Giants vs Royals, August 10, 2014

The stadium's AstroTurf was replaced by grass for the 1995 season. As part of the project, four-inch (10 cm) perforated tiles were installed at 12.5-foot (3.8 m) centers across the entire field to improve drainage.

In 2014, the Royals started placing a "W" on the Hall of Fame wall for every home win, similar to the Chicago Cubs hoisting a white flag with a blue "W" at Wrigley Field for every Cub home win.

== Food at the Stadium ==
Kauffman Stadium features a wide offering of food options. From local Kansas City staples like Joe's Kansas City Bar-B-Que to ballpark classic snacks, fans in attendance have a wide variety to choose from. Aramark is responsible for some of the food and beverage options served at the ballpark, with Executive Chef Philip Thompson, along with the other stadium line cooks, creating a Kansas City-centric menu with offerings spread throughout The K.

== Accessibility and Transportation ==
Kauffman Stadium is located at One Royal Way, Kansas City, MO 64129. The stadium is reachable via I-70 and Blue Ridge Cutoff as well as I-435 and Stadium Drive/Raytown Road.

It shares “nearly 400 acres” of parking and stadium space with Arrowhead Stadium within the Truman Sports Complex. “Kauffman Stadium has a capacity of 37,903."

The K is located outside of downtown in a suburban area of Kansas City. Utilizing rideshare, driving a personal or rented vehicle, or taking public transportation is all feasible, but selecting the best option is entirely dependent on where fans are coming from. If you're traveling and do not live in Kansas City, “renting a car or using ridesharing services are the fastest and easiest ways to travel from the airport to your hotel and Kauffman Stadium." General parking passes during regular season games are expected to cost $21. To enhance security and expedite entry, Kauffman Stadium has a clear bag policy, allowing only transparent bags of specific dimensions for easier inspection and quicker access. Backpacks are not allowed.

== Renovations ==
Prior to the 1991 season, a Sony Jumbotron full-color video board was installed beyond the left field wall. At 30 feet (9.1 m) tall and 40 feet (12 m) wide, it was the largest of its kind in the United States when it debuted, and remained in use through the 2007 season.

To generate more home runs, Kauffman Stadium's outfield fences from bullpen to bullpen were moved in 10 feet from their original dimensions, and the outfield wall height was reduced from 12 to 9 feet (3.7 to 2.7 m) prior to the 1995 season. They were returned to their original dimensions prior to the 2005 season.

On Opening Day 1999, minor renovations were debuted, including the addition of the "Crown Club" premium seating area behind home plate between the dugouts, and dugout level suites. Kauffman Stadium's seats originally featured a descending color scheme of red, gold, and orange, similar to Arrowhead Stadium; the original field level seats in Kauffman Stadium were replaced by dark blue seats, and by 2000, the gold loge level seats and red upper-level seats were all replaced by dark blue seats, the field level seats also getting cupholders.

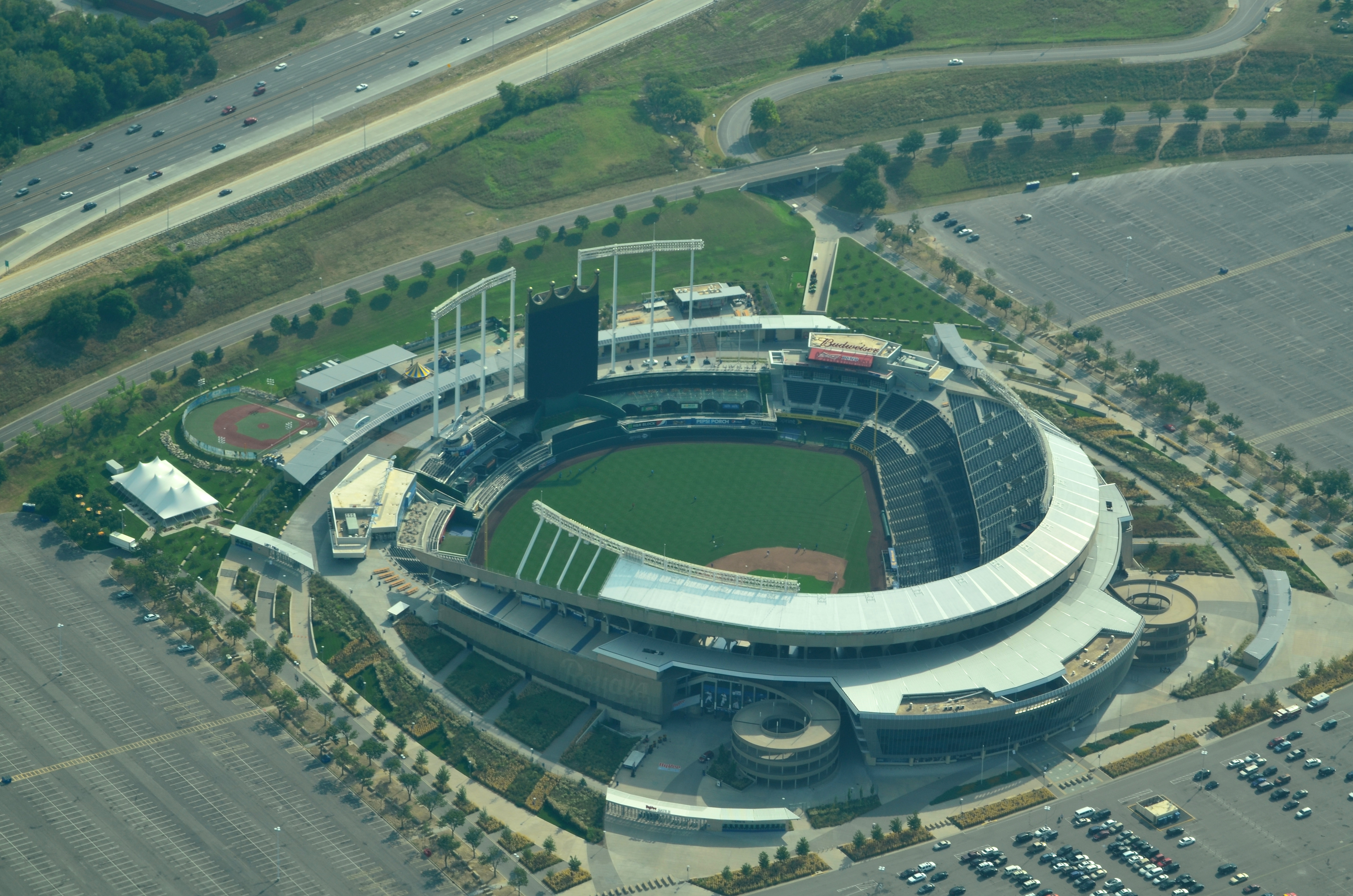
Aerial view in August 2013

On April 4, 2006, Jackson County voters approved a 0.375% sales tax increase to fund plans to renovate the Truman Sports Complex. As part of this measure, every Jackson County residential address was to receive vouchers good for 50% off two tickets at Royals games on certain nights. The construction began with a ceremonial groundbreaking inside Kauffman Stadium on October 3, 2007, with its completion in time for Opening Day in 2009, and full renovation of the complex (including nearby Arrowhead Stadium) by 2010, depending upon cost overruns. The team committed to a lease that would keep them in Kansas City until 2030, an extension of its then-current lease expiration of 2015.

The improvements to Kauffman Stadium included:

- Reducing seating capacity to 37,903
- Four new entry ticket gates
- Enhanced vertical circulation to all seating levels
- Wider concourses
- Two widened vomitorium portals in the upper deck
- Two widened vomitorium portals in the field level
- New and upgraded concessions and toilet amenities on all concourses
- New press facilities
- New HD scoreboard, dubbed "Crown Vision," and control room
- 360-degree outfield concourse
- Fountain view terraces
- Outfield kids' area
- "Taste of KC" food court
- Right field sports bar-themed restaurant
- Left field Hall of Fame and conference center
- New group sales areas

Extensive renovations in the outfield including the relocation of the bullpens caused the left and right center field dimensions to be increased by 2 feet (0.61 m).

The new HD scoreboard was one of the first features to be installed. It replaced the matrix board in the shape of the Royals logo that had been in use in the park since its opening, along with the video board in left field. It was adorned with a crown, giving it an appearance similar to the old matrix board. The new scoreboard was ready for Opening Day 2008. It is 85 feet (26 m) wide and 105 feet (32 m) tall, and was, at the time it entered service, the largest high-definition LED display in the world. The Kauffman Stadium screen was eventually surpassed by the new scoreboard at Seattle's T-Mobile Park in 2013. The display was assembled in 55 separate segments, including an active bottom taper to resemble the shield in the Royals logo. The video scoreboard alone cost $8.3 million, and the control room that operates it is staffed with 17 people on game days. Strobe lights atop the crown flash after every Royals home run.

A second proposal on the April 2006 ballot would have installed a rolling roof at the Truman Sports Complex. The roof could have been moved to cover either Kauffman Stadium or Arrowhead Stadium when needed. The proposal was defeated by fewer than 4,000 votes.

== Concerts ==
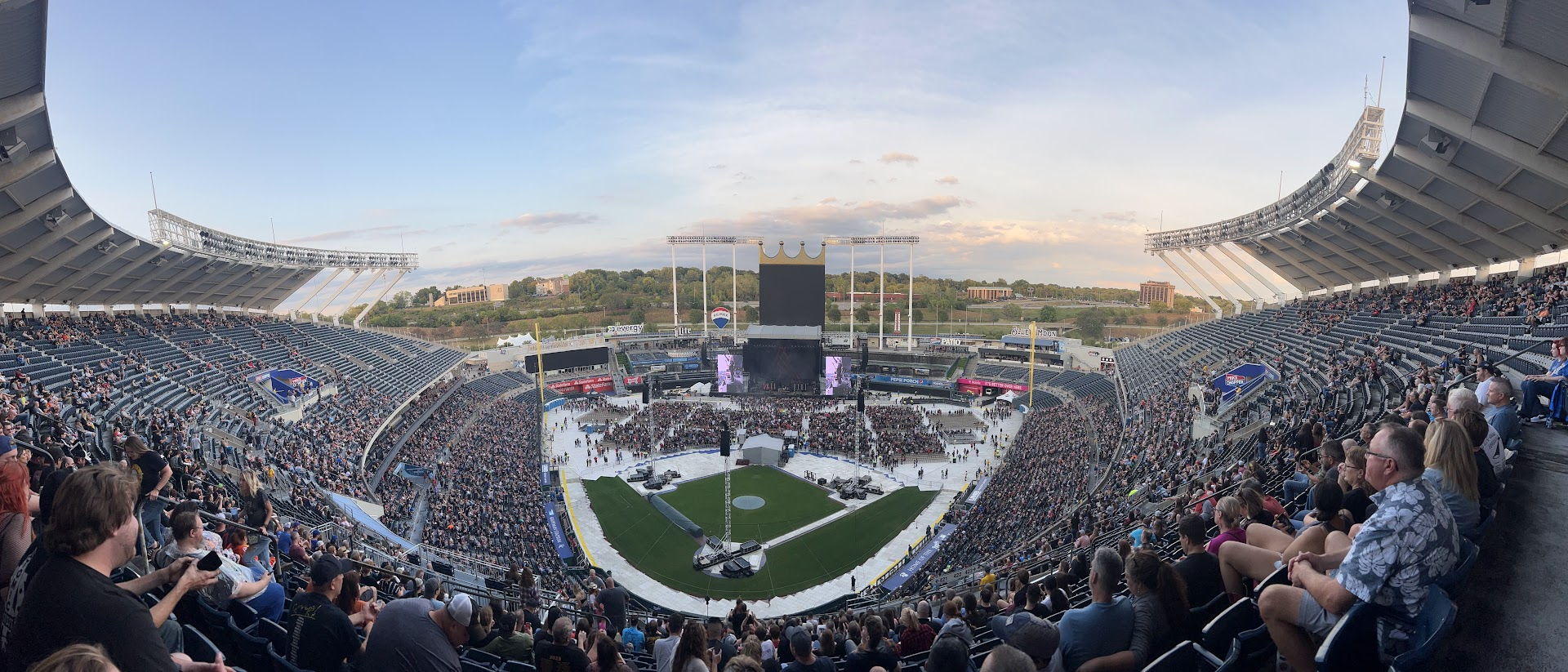
The stage setup for the 2023 Alice in Chains and Guns N' Roses concert at Kauffman

Date	Artist	Opening act(s)	Tour / Concert name	Attendance	Revenue	Notes
August 17, 1975	Fleetwood Mac	—	Fleetwood Mac Tour	—	—	This concert was part of the Summer Jam Festival.
July 15, 1978	Van Halen	—	1978 World Tour	—	$423,904	This concert was part of the Summer Jam Festival.
September 1, 1979	REO Speedwagon	—	Nine Lives Tour	34,089	—	This concert was part of the Summer Jam Festival.
September 21, 2018	Billy Joel	—	Billy Joel in Concert	40,589 / 40,589	$4,500,565	First Concert not associated with a baseball game at the stadium in 39 years.
July 19, 2022	Def Leppard & Mötley Crüe	Poison, Joan Jett & the Blackhearts & Classless Act	The Stadium Tour	-	-	
September 23, 2023	Guns N' Roses	Alice in Chains	We're F'N' Back! Tour	-	-	
July 15, 2026	Post Malone	Jelly Roll; Carter Faith	Big Ass Stadium Tour			

== Buck O'Neil legacy seat ==
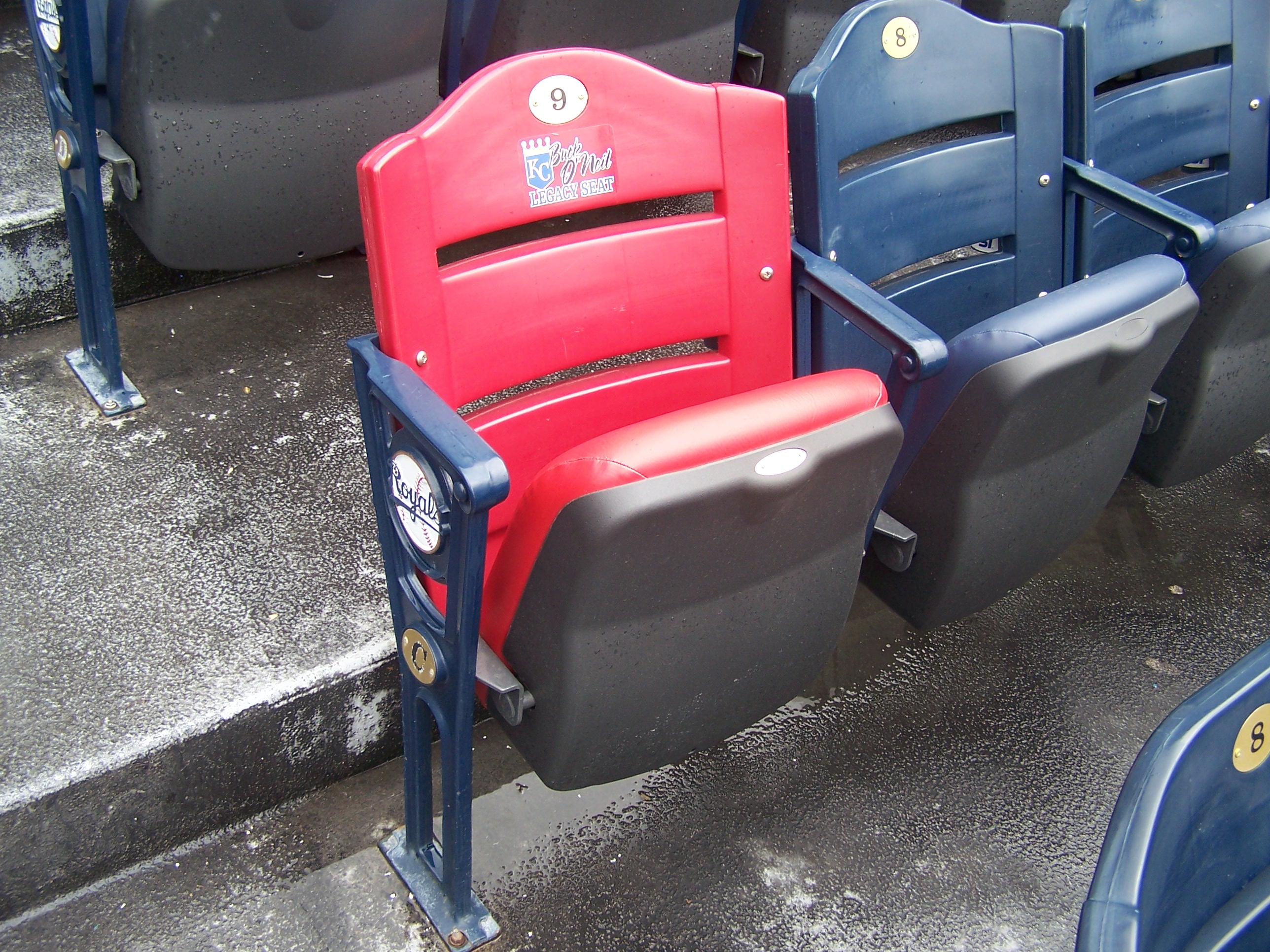
The O'Neil legacy seat

Beginning with the 2007 season, the Royals had a red seat placed in the stadium amongst the all-blue seats behind home plate to honor Buck O'Neil. Every game, there will be a person who embodies the spirit of Buck O'Neil selected from community nominees to sit in that seat, formerly occupied by O'Neil. The seat is located behind home plate in what was Section 101, Row C, Seat 1, until 2008. Due to the stadium renovations and accompanying section renumbering in 2009, the seat number is now Section 127, Row C, Seat 9, and the seat bottom is now padded. O'Neil played for the Kansas City Monarchs of the Negro leagues from 1937 to 1955.

== Statues ==
Four statues lay out in the outfield concourse behind the fountains. Three of the statues are located in right field (George Brett, Dick Howser and Frank White). The fourth is located in left field, and is the former Royals owner Ewing Kauffman and his wife Muriel. A statue of Buck O’Neil is also located on the grounds, depicting him as sitting on a bench in conversation. As of the 2026 season, it is located in the Royals Museum lobby.

== Notes ==
^Note 1: Candlestick Park (1960), Angel Stadium (1966), and Jarry Park Stadium (1969) were all originally built as baseball-only facilities. Candlestick Park has been demolished, and Jarry Park Stadium was renovated into Stade IGA, a tennis-specific stadium with only a small portion of the original stadium present. Both Candlestick Park and Angel Stadium were converted to multi-purpose facilities. Anaheim Stadium, now known as Angel Stadium of Anaheim, was re-converted into a baseball-only facility in 1996, though that venue continues to host high school playoff football games.

Events and tenants
Preceded by Municipal Stadium	Home of the Kansas City Royals; 1973 – present	Succeeded by Current
Preceded by Atlanta–Fulton County Stadium; Chase Field	Host of the MLB All-Star Game; 1973; 2012	Succeeded by Three Rivers Stadium; Citi Field
