= Emmanuel Taiwo Jegede =

Nigerian poet and sculptor (born 1943)

- Born: June 1943 (age 82–83); Ayegbaju Ekiti, Nigeria
- Education: Willesden College of Technology; Hammersmith College of Art
- Occupations: Sculptor, poet, painter, printmaker
- Children: Tunde, Martin, Funmilayo, Ayodeji, Toyin, Anu, Kolade, David

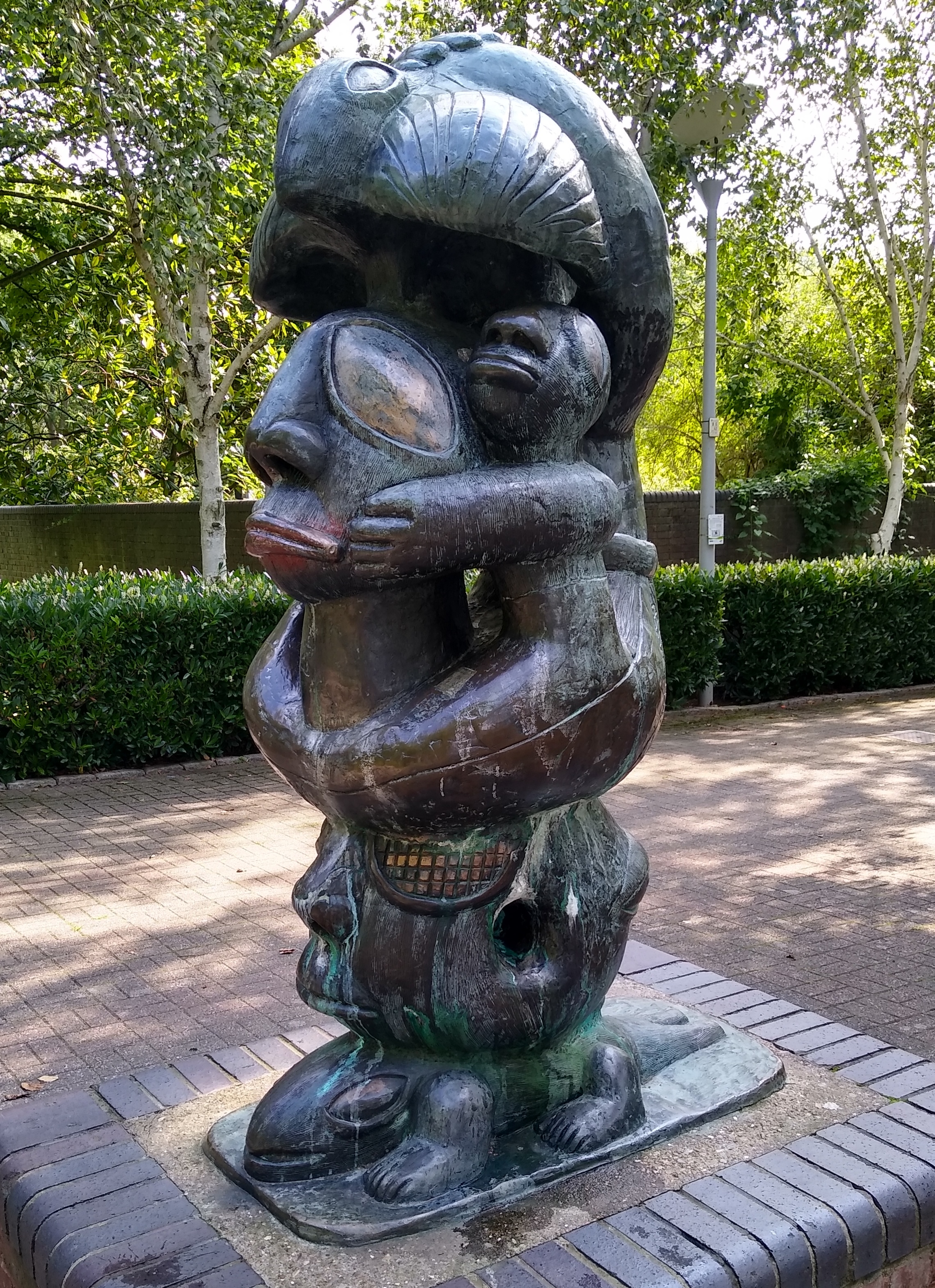
A sculpture by Jegede in Elthorne Park, London Borough of Islington

Emmanuel Taiwo Jegede (born June 1943) is a Nigerian poet, storyteller and artist, best known as a painter, printmaker, and sculptor (in wood, bronze and ceramics).

== Biography ==
=== Early years and education ===
Emmanuel Taiwo Jegede was born in Ayegbaju Ekiti, a Yoruba-speaking region of Nigeria.

He undertook an apprenticeship with sculptor Pa Akerejola in Ekiti before going on to the Yaba School of Technology in Lagos, where he studied with Edo sculptor Osagie Osifo.

In 1963, Jegede travelled to the UK, where he attended Willesden College of Technology and Hammersmith College of Art, studying the decorative arts, interior design, sculpture and bronze casting.

=== Career ===
His first exhibition took place in 1968 at the Woodstock Gallery, London. In 1970, he set up a studio and foundry at Riverside, London. During the following decade, Jegede's work featured on the covers of books such as Buchi Emecheta's novels The Bride Price (1976) and The Slave Girl (1977), published by Allison & Busby.

In 1977, he was among the Black artists and photographers whose work represented the UK at the Second World Festival of Black Arts and African Culture (Festac '77) in Lagos, Nigeria (the others being Winston Branch, Ronald Moody, Mercian Carrena, Armet Francis, Uzo Egonu, Neil Kenlock, Donald Locke, Cyprian Mandala, Ossie Murray, Sue Smock, Lance Watson and Aubrey Williams).

Also in the 1970s, Jegede was artist-in-residence at the Keskidee Centre (the UK's first arts centre for the Black community), where he was exposed to resident and visiting artists who worked in a multi-disciplinary mode, including Bob Marley, Walter Rodney, Edward Brathwaite, Angela Davis and Linton Kwesi Johnson. In 1978, Jegede led to the founding of an initiative called the Rainbow Art Group (members included Indira Ariyanayagam, Uzo Egonu, Lancelot Ribeiro, Errol Lloyd, Yeshwant Mali, Gordon V. de La Mothe, Durlabh Singh, Suresh Vedak, Ibrahim Wagh, and Mohammad Zakir, as well as Jegede) that mounted its first exhibition the following year — Paintings and Sculptures at Action Space, London.

Among other exhibitions that included Jegede's work were Afro-Caribbean Art (27 April–25 May 1978 at the Artists Market, London), organised by Drum Arts Centre, and Transforming the Crown: African, Asian and Caribbean Artists in Britain 1966 – 1996, curated by the Caribbean Cultural Center, New York City, in 1997–98. More recently, Jegede's work featured in the 2015 exhibition No Colour Bar: Black British Art in Action 1960–1990 at the Guildhall Art Gallery, City of London, which is inspired by the papers held at London Metropolitan Archives of Jessica Huntley and Eric Huntley and the publishing company they founded, Bogle-L'Ouverture Publications, as well as its associated bookshop, where in the 1970s greetings cards featuring Jegede's artwork were sold.

Jegede participated in his son Tunde Jegede's theatrical project The Griot's Tale, which was showcased in 2013 at Yinka Shonibare's studio and subsequently performed at the Africa Centre, London.

He has also written a number of poems and children’s stories.

== Family ==
Jegede has eight children; five sons and three daughters including:

- Tunde Jegede a musician and composer. Tunde has performed at and founded the Art Ensemble of Lagos and the African Classical Music Ensemble. He is the artistic director at the MUSON Centre, one of West Africa's only music conservatoires specialising in classical music.
- Martin Jegede, an award-winning fashion designer and founder of jewellery brand Love Bullets.
- Ayodeji Jegede, a basketball player with London Westside, trainer and entrepreneur.
- Adekunle "David" Jegede, a successful artist in his own right, having exhibited at London's Saatchi Gallery, as a winner of the CARISCC artwork competition, in addition to being a published author.

His four other children are: Kolade Jegede, Anu Jegede, Funmilayo Jegede and Toyin Jegede.
