= Oscar Abrams =

Guyanese architect, theatre designer, and community activist (1937–1996)

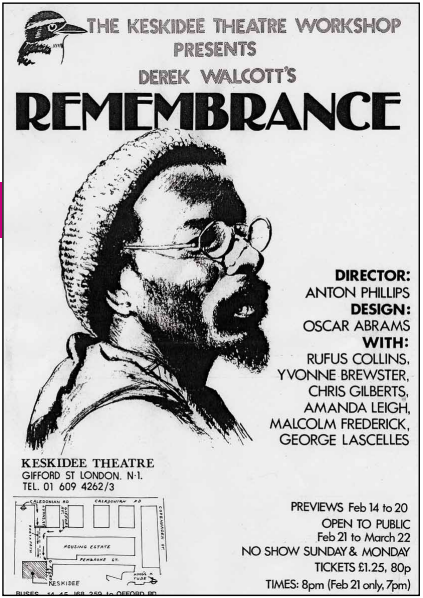
- Born: Oscar Winston Abrams; 10 March 1937; Guyana
- Died: 15 February 1996 (aged 58)
- Occupations: Architect; theatre designer; community activist
- Known for: Establishing the Keskidee Centre in Islington, London
- Children: Amah-Rose Abrams

Oscar Abrams (10 March 1937 – 15 February 1996) was a Guyanese architect, theatre designer, community activist and community organiser. He is best known for establishing the Keskidee Theatre Workshop in 1971, the first British brick and mortar Black-led arts centre on Gifford Street in the borough of Islington, London, England. Abrams was the chairman of the Islington branch of the Campaign Against Racial Discrimination (CARD), a community organisation that advocated for decent housing conditions, tenant rights and education rights for Caribbeans who emigrated to the United Kingdom.

== Biography ==
Oscar Winston Abrams was born in Guyana and emigrated to London, England, in 1958.

Together with Norma Ashe-Watt (1931–2025), a Trinidad-born friend living in Barnsbury, north London, Abrams formed a local branch of the Campaign Against Racial Discrimination (CARD), an organisation advocating in the 1960s for race relations legislation to address the rights of Black and Asian migrants who were suffering discrimination.

In 1971, Abrams bought a run-down Victorian mission hall in Gifford Street, Islington, near King's Cross, from the Shaftesbury Society for £9000 and transformed it into the Keskidee Centre, which came to provide "a unique and hugely influential cultural and political environment for the black community throughout the 1970s and early-1980s." The centre's name and logo derived from the keskidee bird native to Guyana and elsewhere in the Caribbean. The motto of the Keskidee Theatre Workshop was: "A community discovering itself creates its own future." This pioneering centre was the only UK space dedicated for Black artists for years. By the late 1970s, it was internationally renowned. Keskidee provided a space for members of the Caribbean Artists Movement, and into the 1980s continued to be an important hub for Black arts and politics.

== Death and legacy ==
Abrams died, aged 58, on 15 February 1996, the Keskidee Centre having had to close as a theatre space four years earlier, in 1992, being sold to pay off debts. Abrams had said in 1987: "[T]he most outstanding achievement for me personally is the consciousness the Keskidee brought to the black community and groups that subsequently became interested in the arts." Later used as a church, the building was honoured in 2011 with a green heritage plaque to mark the 40th anniversary of the opening of the Keskidee Centre; unfortunately, however, in 2012 the building was destroyed by fire.

The George Padmore Institute (GPI) in London holds an archive of documents preserving Abrams' legacy of cultural contributions, activism, projects, interviews with community leaders, correspondence and other ephemera. His contemporaries included: cultural theorist Stuart Hall, author Anne Walmsley, poet Derek Walcott, journalist Donald Hinds, editor Diana Athill, Winston Benn, Felicity Bolton, Norma Kathleen Ashe, Donald Bowen, artist Winston Branch, poet Kamau Brathwaite, storyteller Faustin Charles, author Austin Clarke, and many others.

== Personal life ==
Abrams was married to charity worker Susanna McKnight (who died in 2017) and the couple had a daughter, Amah-Rose Abrams.
