= New Kansas City Royals Stadium =

Proposed baseball stadium

New Royals Stadium
- August 2026 rendering of the proposed stadium
- Interactive map of New Royals Stadium
- Location: Kansas City, Missouri
- Coordinates: 39°4′46″N 94°34′46″W
- Capacity: 34,000

Construction
- Groundbreaking: 2027 (projected)
- Opened: 2030 (projected)
- Cost: $2 billion
- Architect: Populous

Tenant
- Kansas City Royals (expected 2030)

Website
- kcballparkdistrict.com

New Royals Stadium is a proposed baseball park to be constructed in the Crown Center neighborhood of Kansas City, Missouri. It is planned to be the home of the Kansas City Royals of Major League Baseball (MLB), succeeding Kauffman Stadium. Announced in April 2026, the stadium is scheduled to open for the 2030 MLB season.

== Background ==
In 2019, a new ownership group led by John Sherman purchased the Kansas City Royals from David Glass. The ownership group also consisted of construction company JE Dunn and private equity firms such as VantEdge Partners.

In 2021, Sherman, the team's majority owner, began speaking openly about his desire for the Royals to play in a stadium in downtown Kansas City. In November 2022, Sherman announced that the team would leave Kauffman Stadium prior to the end of their current lease, scheduled to expire at the end of the 2030 MLB season. The team announced in June 2023 that the two final sites under consideration for the stadium district were the East Village neighborhood and North Kansas City. However, a third site in the Crossroads district emerged as the final site chosen by the team in February 2024.

While the Royals ownership group committed $1 billion towards a stadium and ballpark district, a larger portion of the funding would have come from the passing of an election referendum for a 40-year, 3/8th-cent sales tax to help finance the new Royals ballpark and renovate Arrowhead Stadium for the Kansas City Chiefs of the National Football League (NFL). This referendum was rejected by Jackson County voters on April 2, 2024. Even after the failed ballot initiative, the team still planned to open a new stadium by the start of the 2027 or 2028 MLB season, with a seating capacity of about 34,000.

The plan was controversial, considering the proposed stadium location would have required over a dozen small businesses to close or relocate, the limited amount of parking downtown, and claims that Kauffman Stadium got a "bad batch of concrete" when built. The Royals also had pledged to invest at least $1 billion towards purchasing and developing real estate around the stadium, but was only willing to pay $300 million towards a new ballpark.

Alongside the stadium plan, the 3/8th-cent sales tax also received significant public pushback due to the Royals and Chiefs struggling to present their finalized stadium plans to voters, bringing about several accusations of a lack of transparency throughout the process.

On April 22, 2026, the Royals and Hallmark Cards announced a partnership to build a new ballpark in Crown Center, at the current location of Hallmark's corporate headquarters, instead of the Crossroads site. Groundbreaking is scheduled to take place in 2027. In October 2026, the Royals and Populous Holdings released updated renderings and confirmed that demolition of existing buildings will begin in late 2026 or early 2027.

== Alternate proposals ==
The Royals also had considered relocating across the state border to Kansas City, Kansas, as well as building a downtown ballpark in Washington Square Park, an area located between Union Station and Crown Center on the Missouri side. In November 2024, it was reported that the Royals were also examining "two or three" potential stadium sites in Johnson County, Kansas.

In May 2025, an affiliate of the Royals purchased the mortgage on the Aspiria campus in Overland Park, Kansas. However, team officials denied that the campus was under consideration as a site for the development of a stadium. In January 2026, the Royals confirmed that the team was no longer considering the Aspiria Campus as an option.

On January 1, 2026, Kansas House Speaker Dan Hawkins advised that the state of Kansas said the door was essentially closed in creating a STAR Bonds deal to build the Royals a stadium in Kansas. "The Royals and the Chiefs both had plenty of time," Hawkins said. "They had 18 months to come up with a good plan. The Chiefs did that. The Royals did not."

On January 7, 2026, Clay County, Missouri Commissioner Jason Withington said that he had ended negotiations with the team, referring to it as "a closed chapter." Withington cited a number of reasons, including missed deadlines by the Royals and the business side of baseball.

== Local response ==
Immediately, elected officials praised the proposed stadium deal and its collaboration with Hallmark. Missouri Governor Mike Kehoe called the decision an investment for all of Missouri and its communities. Kansas City Mayor Quinton Lucas said the new stadium would create numerous union jobs, both through construction and game day operations. He also pointed to the financial structure of the project, funded “by baseball and ancillary development” instead of a tax increase, and without “prudent fiscal management”. Jackson County Executive Phil LeVota called the plans “a big win for our community.”

Many business and property owners near the planned site stated excitement about the potential impact a baseball stadium would have on the area and local businesses' sales and visibility. President and CEO of University Health, Charlie Shields, expressed excitement about the new stadium location. University Health is within a half mile of the site, but he isn't predicting the proximity will cause issues for the hospital. CEO of The Ronald McDonald House KC stated excitement about the proximity of the new stadium for visiting families.

On June 29, 2026, a community engagement meeting on the Royal's rezoning request drew a large community presence, though they were more concerned with the financial details of the new stadium. Although state funding for the stadium will only be from taxes that will be generated by the new stadium, the city's contribution will be a tax increment financing (TIF) plan. In total, the city plans to commit initially $615.2 million in bonds, which will be paid back over time, ideally generated through an increased tax of the area surrounding the new stadium. However, critics have looked at another TIF backed development in KC, the Power and Light District, which did not generate enough revenue to pay the debt, and the city has at to additionally cover, on average, $10.5 million per year.

== See also ==
- New Chiefs Stadium – A planned domed stadium for the Kansas City Chiefs (NFL) to be constructed in Kansas City, Kansas.
