= Michael McMillan =

British playwright, artist, curator and educator (born 1962)

- Born: 1962 (age 63–64); High Wycombe, UK
- Education: Sussex University; Central Saint Martins (MA)
- Occupations: Playwright, artist/curator
- Notable work: The West Indian Front Room

Michael McMillan (born 1962) is a British playwright, artist, curator and educator, born in England to parents who were migrants from St Vincent and the Grenadines (SVG). As an academic, he focuses his research on "the creative process, ethnography, oral histories, material culture and performativity". He is the author of several plays, and as an artist his first installation, The West Indian Front Room, was exhibited at the Geffrye Museum in 2005, going on to inspire a 2007 BBC Four documentary Tales from the Front Room, a website, a 2009 book, The Front Room: Migrant Aesthetics in the Home, and various international commissions, such as Van Huis Uit: The Living Room of Migrants in the Netherlands (Imagine IC, Amsterdam, and Netherlands Tour, 2007–08) and A Living Room Surrounded by Salt (IBB, Curaçao, 2008). A more recent installation of the Walter Rodney Bookshop featured as part of the 2015 exhibition No Colour Bar at the Guildhall Art Gallery.

McMillan has said of the range of his work: "I was a painter before I was a playwright/dramatist and through making live art pieces and writing critically about performance, photography, visual arts culture, I have come home in a sense to fine arts, through making mixed-media installations, which given my interest in performativity background can be seen also as theatre sets. My work and practice is often interdisciplinary using mixed media, installations and performance."

== Life and career ==
Michael McMillan was born in 1962 in High Wycombe, UK, of Caribbean migrant heritage; as he has said, "Both my parents came from St Vincent & the Grenadines and ... were 'arrivants', to use Edward Kamau Brathwaite's term, from colonies where they were imbued with English culture." Given this background, McMillan has noted: "I grew up with learning three languages: the creole spoken by my parents as a fusion of an English lexicon and an African grammar; the Jamaican English spoken on the streets of Hackney and around London and the London English spoken at school."

As a youth McMillan attended the Keskidee Centre, a Black-led theatre and arts community space in London. The Keskidee was the first of its kind in England and had a great influence on McMillan:

"Keskidee Arts Centre was the first Black community arts centre in the UK, off Caledonian Road in Islington. It was run by the Guyanese-born Oscar Abrams, with the African-American Rufus Collin as Artistic Director. It was where Linton Kwesi Johnson developed dub poetry while running the library, Angela Davis spoke, and Bob Marley filmed the video for 'Is This Love?'. I went there often as a teenager, seeing Black theatre productions like Edgar White's 'Lament for Rastafari', Derek Walcott's 'Pantomine' and Lennox Brown's 'Throne in an Autumn Room'. I would eventually become part of this world as a playwright."'

McMillan won an essay competition, run by Len Garrison's ACER (Afro-Caribbean Education Resource), which led to him being chosen, aged 15, as one of the "Black Britain" delegates to attend FESTAC '77 (the Second World Festival of African Arts and Culture). He subsequently wrote his play The School Leaver (1978), which was produced at the Royal Court Theatre's Young Writers' Festival (with a cast that included Allister Bain, Trevor Laird and Isabelle Lucas, among others).

McMillan read sociology and African and Asian studies at Sussex University, graduating in 1984, and then earned an MA degree in Independent Film & Video from Central Saint Martins, London, in 1991. From 2000, he was a Royal Literary Fund Writing Fellow at the London College of Communication and went on to become, since 2003, a Visiting Professor of Creative Writing at the University of the Arts London (UAL), and a researcher and Associate Lecturer at the London College of Fashion (LCF), teaching predominantly Cultural & Historical Studies. He was awarded a practice-based Arts Doctorate from Middlesex University in 2010. In 2010–11, he was Arts in Health & Well Being artist-in-residence in North Wales.

=== Writing ===
McMillan's interest in oral history and the stories of first-generation Caribbean migrants is reflected in early writings such as Brother to Brother (1996) and The Black Boy Pub & Other Stories (1997), which used recordings of interviews done during a year's residence in High Wycombe, where many of those arriving in particular from SVG had settled. As a dramatist, he has had work performed and produced by the Royal Court Theatre, Channel 4, BBC Radio 4, and in venues across the UK. His play The School Leaver was published by the Black Ink Collective in 1978, when McMillan was 16 years old, and was reprinted several times. His other plays include Master Juba (2006), Babel Junction (2006), and a new translation of Bertholt Brecht's The Good Person of Sezuan, set in Jamaica in the 1980s.

McMillan has written a number of essays and articles in national and international publications, and has presented papers at conferences and symposiums in the UK, Europe, Canada, USA, Caribbean and Brazil, including as keynote speaker at the 2006 "Islands in Between" Conference on Language, Literature & History of the Eastern Caribbean (University of the West Indies, School of Continuing Studies, St. Vincent & the Grenadines). McMillan contributed towards the 2024 book Encounters with James Baldwin: Celebrating 100 Years.

=== Installations ===
Alongside teaching, McMillan has also worked on mixed-media exhibitions and publications. His first installation, The West Indian Front Room (he uses "the term 'West Indian' as it refers to a particular moment of post-World War II Caribbean migration to England and the wider Diaspora"), drew on memories of the domestic setting created by his parents and their like after they migrated to Britain, featuring a recreation of a typical front room of the 1970s to raise "questions about the constructions of diaspora, identity, race, class and gender in the domestic interior". According to cultural theorist Stuart Hall, "The front room is a conservative element of black domestic life, which is more complex and rich than the generality of the society ever realises"; nevertheless, McMillan recalled in an article in The Guardian:

"Growing up in our front room caused me much aesthetic distress. The wallpaper and carpet never seemed to match, and Jim Reeves would be crooning from the Blue Spot radiogram on a Sunday. This room was based on the Victorian parlour and was inscribed with a formal code of behaviour because it was reserved for receiving guests. It was packed with furniture, ornaments and soft furnishings surrounded by a gallery of pictures and photographs."

Mounted at London's Geffrye Museum in October 2005, the critically acclaimed exhibition resonated with more than 35,000 visitors who represented a variety of ages, genders and social, cultural and ethnic backgrounds. Different versions have since been remade in other countries and cultural settings, including in the Netherlands and in Curaçao, and the associated BBC4 television documentary Tales from the Front Room was broadcast in 2007. He has also made presentations on The Front Room at the University of Wisconsin-Madison (2009), Clark University, Worcester (2009) and Northwestern University, Chicago, (2008). A book entitled The Front Room: Migrant Aesthetics in the Home followed in 2009.

Another installation-based exhibition was The Beauty Shop (2008) at the 198 Gallery in south London, where, as with The Front Room, McMillan "tried to create a tangible sense of performance. Visitors were encouraged to respond to them as theatre as much as art."

In 2015, he recreated the Walter Rodney Bookshop as an installation within the exhibition No Colour Bar: Black British Art in Action 1960–1990 at the Guildhall Art Gallery (July 2015–January 2016), and participated in related events.

Another recent work is Doing Nothing Is Not An Option, a site-responsive mixed-media installation to commemorate the 20th anniversary of the death of Ken Saro-Wiwa by exploring the relationship between local people in Peckham and the memory of the Nigerian writer and activist.

== Selected curatorial work ==
- Van Huis Uit: The Living Room of Migrants in the Netherlands (Imagine IC, Amsterdam, and Netherlands Tour, 2007–08)
- A Living Room Surrounded by Salt (Instituto Buena Bista, Curaçao, 2008)
- The Beauty Shop (198 Contemporary Arts and Learning, Brixton, 25 January 2008 – 28 March 2013)
- The West Indian Front Room (Geffrye Museum, 2005–06)
- The Southall Story (South Bank Centre, 2010)
- "I Miss My Mum’s Cooking" (in Who More Sci-Fi Than Us, KAdE Kunsthal, Amersfoort, Netherlands, 2012)
- "The Waiting Room" (in Stories and Journeys, Gwynedd Museum & Art Gallery, Bangor, North Wales, 2012)
- "My Hair: Black Hair Culture, Style and Politics" (in Origins of the Afro Comb, Museum of Archaeology and Anthropology, 2013)
- "The Walter Rodney Bookshop" (in No Colour Bar: Black British Art in Action 1960–1990, Guildhall Art Gallery, 10 July 2015 – 24 January 2016)

== Selected publications ==
- The School Leaver (Black Ink Collective, 1978)
- On Duty (Akira Press, 1984)
- Editor, Words, Sounds & Power Anthology (Centerprise Publishing Project, 1988)
- Living Proof: Views of a World Living with HIV/AIDS (Artist Agency, 1992).
- The Black Boy Pub & Other Stories: The black experience in High Wycombe (Wycombe District Council, 1997).
- If I Could Fly: An anthology of writings from young men at Orchard Lodge Resource Centre (Southwark Social Services, 1998).
- Growing Up Is Hard To Do: A Book For Young People & Adults About Sexual Health (Young People's Health Project, 2000).
- Same Difference: 25 Years of International Youth Volunteering with the Daneford Trust (2006).
- The Waiting Room: An audio-visual tale of an artist in residence at the Alaw Ward (Cancer & Palliative Care Unit) in Ysbyty Gwynedd & Rheumatology Clinics in Ysbyty Gwynedd and Ysbyty Llandudno (2006)
- The Front Room: Migrant Aesthetics in the Home (Black Dog Publishing, 2009). Revised edition, The Front Room: Diaspora Migrant Aesthetics in the Home (illus; with Foreword by Margaret Busby), Lund Humphries, 2023, ISBN 9781848225930.

== Plays and performance pieces ==
- The School Leaver (Royal Court Theatre, 1978)
- Hard Time Pressure (Royal Court Theatre, 1980)
- Carve Your Name (The Old Vic Theatre, 1981)
- Day of Action (Brent Black People's Theatre, 1981)
- On Duty (Carlton Centre, Kilburn, 1983)
- First Impressions (Perspective Theatre Company, 1988)
- Portrait of a Shopping Centre as a Cathedral (1990)
- The Last Blind Date (Artists Alliance/Live Theatre, 1992)
- Invisible (Double Edge Theatre Company; 1993 & 1998)
- Brother to Brother (Lyric Hammersmith and tour, 1996 & 1998); in Cheryl Robson (ed.), Black and Asian Plays Anthology, Aurora Metro, 2000
- I Hope It's Not a Black Man (1996)
- After Windrush (Oval House Theatre, 1998)
- Blood for Britain (BBC Radio 4 Drama, 2001)
- Can you Play Football? (2004)
- Babel Junction (Empire Theatre, 2006)
- Master Juba (Luton Library Theatre, Albany Theatre, 2006)
- New translation of The Good Person of Sezuan by Bertolt Brecht (2010 & 2012)
