= Egonu =

- Pronunciation
- Language: Igbo

Origin
- Meaning: 'to not listen to (mischievous/slanderous) words'
- Region of origin: southeastern Nigeria

Egonu is a surname of Igbo origin in southeastern Nigeria.

== Notable people ==
- Paola Egonu (born 1998), Italian volleyball player
- Uzo Egonu (1931–1996), Nigerian-British artist
