= List of current Major League Baseball stadiums =

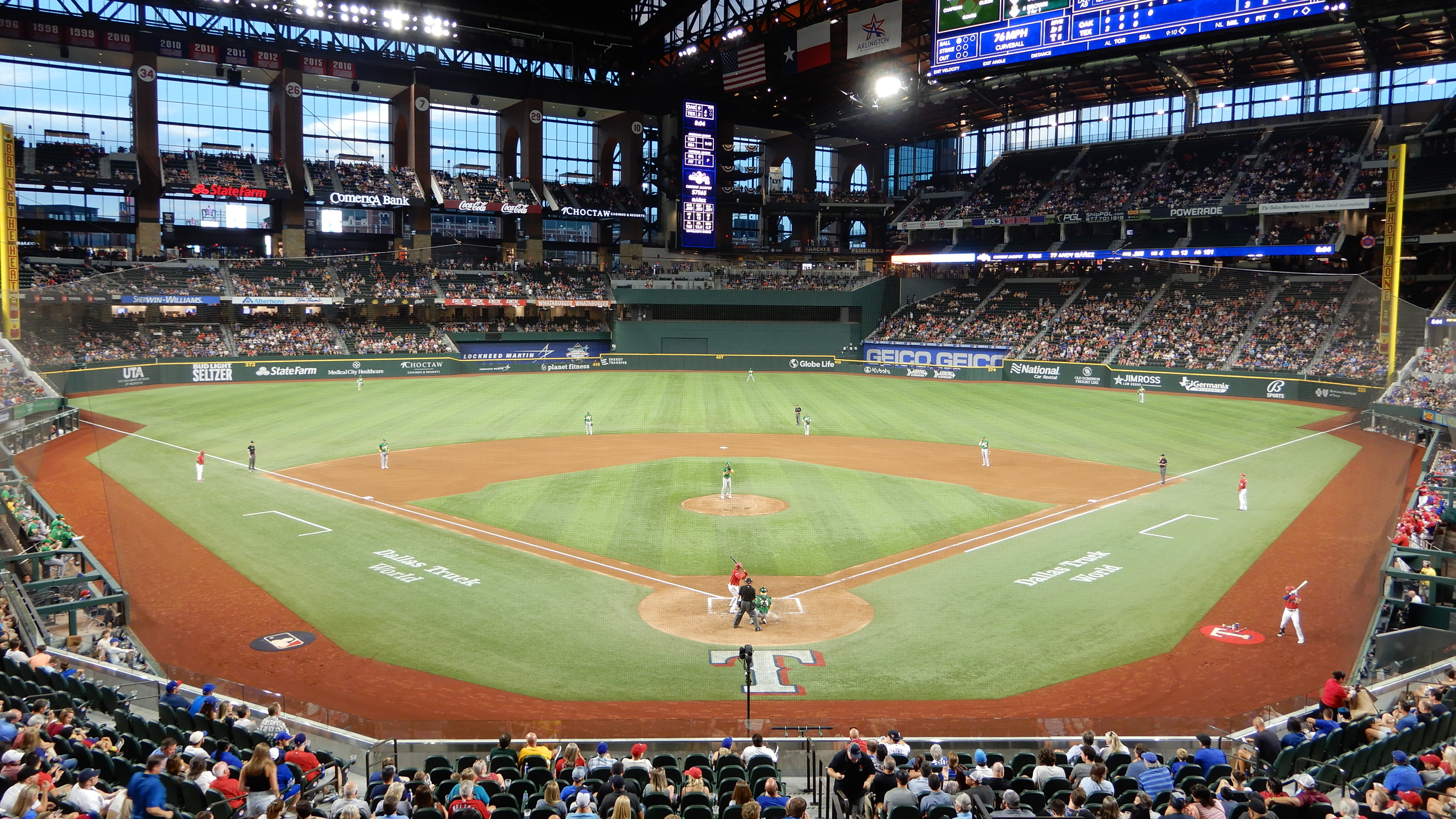
Globe Life Field, home of the Texas Rangers, is the newest stadium in Major League Baseball. It opened in 2020.

There are 30 stadiums in use by Major League Baseball (MLB) teams. The oldest ballpark is Fenway Park in Boston, home of the Boston Red Sox, which opened in 1912. The newest stadium is Globe Life Field in Arlington, Texas, home of the Texas Rangers, which opened in 2020. Two ballparks were built in the 1910s, two in the 1960s, one in the 1970s, one in the 1980s, seven in the 1990s, thirteen in the 2000s, three in the 2010s, and one in the 2020s.

Twenty-five ballparks have natural grass surfaces, while five have artificial turf. Eight ballparks do not have corporate naming rights deals: Angel Stadium, (Note: Angel Stadium had a naming rights deal from 1998 to 2003.) Dodger Stadium, (Note: Though the Dodgers sold naming rights of the field to Uniqlo, the team retains stadium branding under the Dodger Stadium name.Solorzano, Anthony (March 16, 2026). "Dodgers reportedly agree to deal with Uniqlo for naming rights to Dodger Stadium field". Yahoo Sports.) Fenway Park, Kauffman Stadium, Nationals Park, Oriole Park at Camden Yards, Wrigley Field, and Yankee Stadium. Sutter Health Park is being used temporarily by the Athletics until a new stadium in Las Vegas is completed in 2028.

== Stadiums ==
Legend:

† Denotes stadium with a fixed roof
‡ Denotes stadium with a retractable roof

Stadiums
Image	Name	Capacity	Location	Surface	Team	Opened	Distance to center field	Type	Roof type
A photograph of a baseball diamond	American Family Field^{‡}	41,900	Milwaukee, Wisconsin	Grass	Milwaukee Brewers	2001	400 feet (122 m)	Retro-modern	Retractable
A photograph of a baseball diamond	Angel Stadium	45,517	Anaheim, California	Grass	Los Angeles Angels	1966	396 feet (121 m)	Modern; Retro-modern	Open
A Busch Stadium 2022	Busch Stadium	44,383	St. Louis, Missouri	Grass	St. Louis Cardinals	2006	400 feet (122 m)	Retro-classic	Open
A Reserve A-10 Warthogs Flyover 2023 World Series	Chase Field^{‡}	48,330	Phoenix, Arizona	Artificial turf	Arizona Diamondbacks	1998	407 feet (124 m)	Retro-modern	Retractable
A photograph of a baseball diamond	Citi Field	41,922	Queens, New York	Grass	New York Mets	2009	408 feet (124 m)	Retro-classic	Open
A Citizens Bank Park 2021	Citizens Bank Park	42,901	Philadelphia, Pennsylvania	Grass	Philadelphia Phillies	2004	401 feet (122 m)	Retro-classic	Open
A photograph of a baseball diamond	Comerica Park	41,083	Detroit, Michigan	Grass	Detroit Tigers	2000	412 feet (126 m)	Retro-classic	Open
A photograph of a baseball diamond	Coors Field	46,897	Denver, Colorado	Grass	Colorado Rockies	1995	415 feet (126 m)	Retro-classic	Open
A photograph of a baseball diamond	Daikin Park^{‡}	41,168	Houston, Texas	Grass	Houston Astros	2000	409 feet (125 m)	Retro-modern	Retractable
A photograph of a baseball diamond	Dodger Stadium	56,000	Los Angeles, California	Grass	Los Angeles Dodgers (Note: Dodger Stadium was also home to the Los Angeles Angels from 1962–1965.)	1962	395 feet (120 m)	Modern	Open
A photograph of a baseball diamond	Fenway Park	37,755	Boston, Massachusetts	Grass	Boston Red Sox (Note: Fenway Park was also home to the Boston Braves in part of 1914 and 1915, before they moved into Braves Field.)	1912	390 feet (119 m)	Jewel box	Open
A photograph of a baseball diamond	Globe Life Field^{‡}	40,300	Arlington, Texas	Artificial turf	Texas Rangers	2020	407 feet (124 m)	Retro-modern	Retractable
A photograph of a baseball diamond	Great American Ball Park	43,500	Cincinnati, Ohio	Grass	Cincinnati Reds	2003	404 feet (123 m)	Retro-modern	Open
A Kauffman2017	Kauffman Stadium	37,903	Kansas City, Missouri	Grass	Kansas City Royals	1973	410 feet (125 m)	Modern; Retro-modern	Open
A photograph of a baseball diamond	LoanDepot Park^{‡}	36,742	Miami, Florida	Artificial turf	Miami Marlins	2012	407 feet (124 m)	Contemporary	Retractable
A photograph of a baseball diamond	Nationals Park	41,373	Washington, D.C.	Grass	Washington Nationals	2008	402 feet (123 m)	Retro-modern	Open
A Oracle Park 2021	Oracle Park	41,331	San Francisco, California	Grass	San Francisco Giants	2000	391 feet (119 m)	Retro-classic	Open
A photograph of a baseball diamond	Oriole Park at Camden Yards	42,455	Baltimore, Maryland	Grass	Baltimore Orioles	1992	410 feet (125 m)	Retro-classic	Open
A photograph of a baseball diamond	Petco Park	39,860	San Diego, California	Grass	San Diego Padres	2004	396 feet (121 m)	Retro-modern	Open
A photograph of a baseball diamond	PNC Park	38,747	Pittsburgh, Pennsylvania	Grass	Pittsburgh Pirates	2001	399 feet (122 m)	Retro-classic	Open
A photograph of a baseball diamond	Progressive Field	34,820	Cleveland, Ohio	Grass	Cleveland Guardians	1994	410 feet (125 m)	Retro-modern	Open
A photograph of a baseball diamond	Rate Field	40,615	Chicago, Illinois	Grass	Chicago White Sox	1991	400 feet (122 m)	Modern; Retro-classic	Open
A Interior of Rogers Centre (Roof Closed) 2024	Rogers Centre^{‡}	39,150	Toronto, Ontario	Artificial turf	Toronto Blue Jays	1989	400 feet (122 m)	Modern	Retractable
A photograph of a baseball diamond	Sutter Health Park	13,416	West Sacramento, California	Grass	Athletics	2000 (Note: Sutter Health Park, the home of the Sacramento River Cats, will serve as home of the Athletics beginning in the 2025 season until their new ballpark in Las Vegas is completed.)	403 feet (123 m)	Retro-modern	Open
A photograph of a baseball diamond	T-Mobile Park^{‡}	47,929	Seattle, Washington	Grass	Seattle Mariners	1999	401 feet (122 m)	Retro-modern	Retractable
A photograph of a baseball diamond	Target Field	38,544	Minneapolis, Minnesota	Grass	Minnesota Twins	2010	404 feet (123 m)	Retro-modern	Open
A photograph of a baseball diamond	Tropicana Field^{†}	25,000	St. Petersburg, Florida	Artificial turf	Tampa Bay Rays	1990 (Note: Tropicana Field opened in 1990; the Tampa Bay Rays have played there since 1998.)	404 feet (123 m)	Modern	Fixed
A photograph of a baseball diamond	Truist Park	41,084	Cumberland, Georgia	Grass	Atlanta Braves	2017	400 feet (122 m)	Retro-modern	Open
A photograph of a baseball diamond	Wrigley Field	41,649	Chicago, Illinois	Grass	Chicago Cubs	1914 (Note: Wrigley Field opened for the Chicago Whales (FL) in 1914; the Chicago Cubs have played there since 1916.)	400 feet (122 m)	Jewel box	Open
A YankeeStadium-9-21-22-3	Yankee Stadium	46,537	Bronx, New York	Grass	New York Yankees	2009	408 feet (124 m)	Retro-classic	Open

=== Future ballparks ===
Under construction
Stadium	Capacity	Location	Surface	Team	Opening	Roof type
New Las Vegas Stadium^{†}	33,000	Paradise, Nevada	Grass	Las Vegas Athletics	2028	Fixed

Proposed
Stadium	Capacity	Location	Surface	Team	Opening	Roof type
New Tampa Bay Rays stadium^{†}	31,000	Tampa, Florida	Artificial turf	Tampa Bay Rays	2029	Fixed
New Royals Stadium	TBD	Kansas City, Missouri	Grass	Kansas City Royals	2030	Open
New White Sox Stadium	TBD	Chicago, Illinois	Grass	Chicago White Sox	TBD	Open

== See also ==
- List of former Major League Baseball stadiums
- List of Major League Baseball spring training stadiums
- List of U.S. baseball stadiums by capacity
- List of U.S. stadiums by capacity
- List of baseball parks by capacity
- List of Nippon Professional Baseball stadiums
- List of Major League Soccer stadiums
- List of National Basketball Association arenas
- List of current National Football League stadiums
- List of National Hockey League arenas
- Lists of stadiums
