= Keskidee Centre =

Former arts centre in London, England

Coordinates: 51.5413°N 0.1205°W

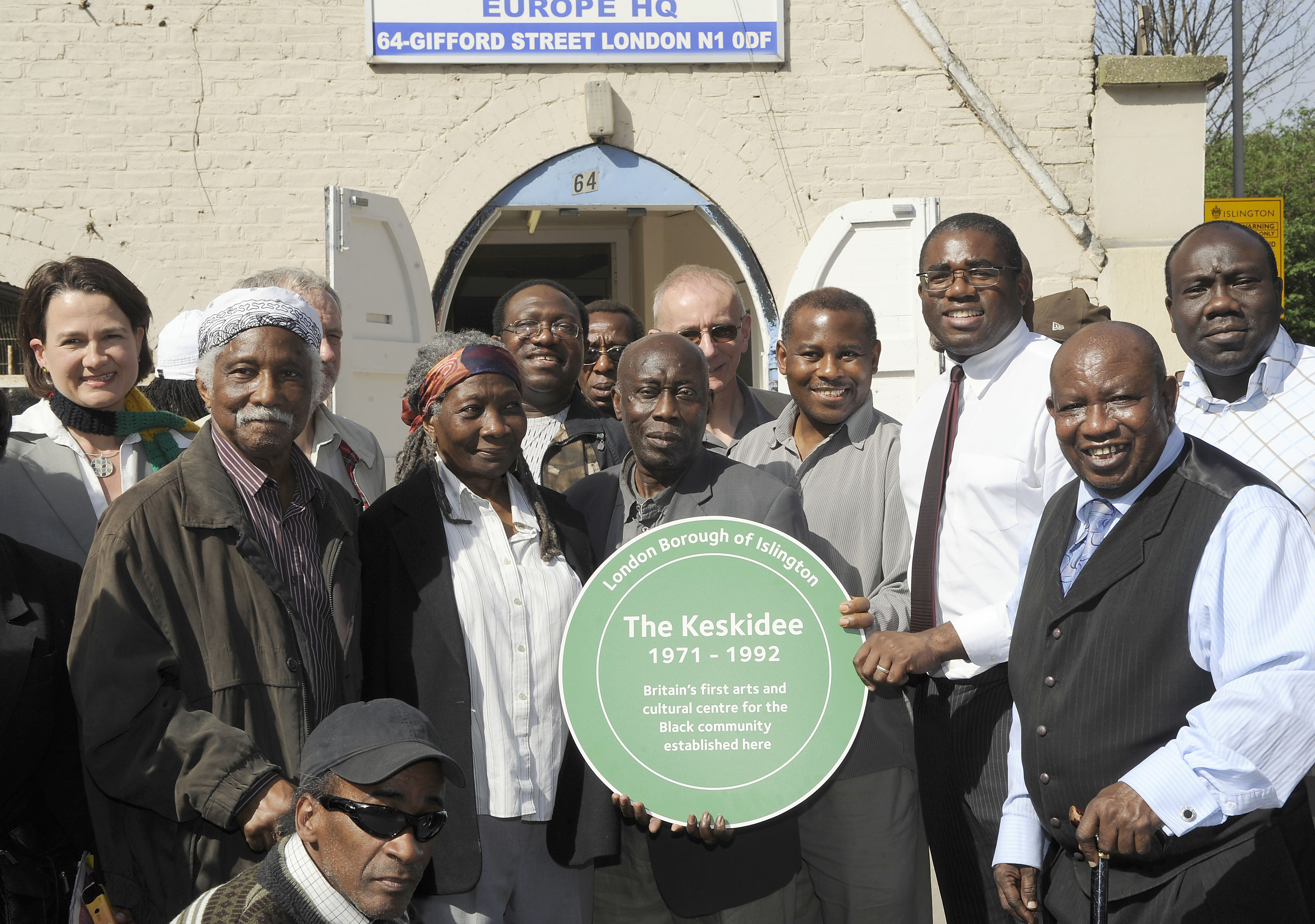
- Green plaque unveiling, 2011. Photo provided courtesy of Islington Council Heritage Services
- Interactive map of Keskidee Centre
- Location: Gifford Street, Islington, London, England
- Type: Arts centre; community centre

Construction
- Opened: 1971
- Closed: 1991

The Keskidee Centre, or Keskidee Arts Centre, was Britain's first arts centre for the Black community, founded in 1971. Located at Gifford Street in Islington, near King's Cross in London, it was a project initiated by Guyanese architect and cultural activist Oscar Abrams (1937–1996) to provide under one roof self-help and cultural activities for the local West Indian community. Its purpose-built facilities included a library, gallery, studios, theatre and restaurant. The Keskidee became a hub for African and Afro-Caribbean politics and arts, and for years was the only place in London that produced black theatre, developing its own vibrant drama company and attracting both a black and white audience.

== History ==
In 1971, Guyanese-born architect and cultural activist Oscar Winston Abrams (1937–1996), who had settled in Britain in 1958, bought a run-down Victorian mission hall from the Shaftesbury Society for £9000 and transformed it into the Keskidee Centre, which came to provide "a unique and hugely influential cultural and political environment for the black community throughout the 1970s and early-1980s." The community centre's name and logo derived from the keskidee bird native to Guyana and elsewhere in the Caribbean.

The Keskidee Theatre workshop was co-founded by Oscar Abrams and Norma Ashe-Watt in 1971, with a full-time drama company dedicated to black theatre, under the artistic direction of African-American Rufus Collins, who had originally come to Britain on tour with The Living Theatre. Among other professional actors, directors, and playwrights it attracted were Yvonne Brewster, Anton Phillips, Howard Johnson, Jimi Rand (Say Hallelujah), Edgar Nkosi White (Lament for Rastafari, 1977; Les Femmes Noires/The Black Women), T-Bone Wilson (Jumbie Street March; Body and Soul, 1974), Pat Maddy (Gbana Bendu, 1973), who at one time was Director of Drama, Yemi Ajibade, and Lindsay Barrett. Staged in the Keskidee Centre were productions of Derek Walcott's Pantomime, Wole Soyinka's The Swamp Dwellers (1975) and Lennox Brown's Throne in an Autumn Room (1973).

Nigerian artist and sculptor Emmanuel Taiwo Jegede was also an artist-in-residence; his son Tunde Jegede, born in 1972 and now a composer and virtuoso kora player, has credited the Keskidee Centre with initiating and nurturing his earliest appreciation of African diaspora culture. Errol Lloyd was also brought in by Abrams to be artist-in-residence (1974–75). As an indication of the significant role played by the Keskidee Centre in nurturing, supporting and celebrating Black visual artists, Diaspora Artists quotes from the Preface to the journal Savacou, issue 9/10, in which John La Rose and Andrew Salkey wrote about a session held at the Keskidee Centre on Friday, 10 March 1972, entitled A Tribute to Ronald Moody, describing it as "a historical exposition, illustrated with slides, of [the] Jamaican sculptor, arranged and presented by Errol Lloyd, the Jamaican painter."

Linton Kwesi Johnson was the Keskidee's first paid library resources and education officer, and his work at the centre featured in Franco Rosso's 45-minute documentary film Dread, Beat an' Blood, produced in 1979. It was at the Keskidee Centre that Johnson developed dub poetry, a staged version of his poem "Voices of the Living and the Dead" being produced by Lindsay Barrett there in 1973, with music by the reggae group Rasta Love. The venue was also used for community meetings and events by the Caribbean Artists Movement. On 10 December 1974, Angela Davis spoke at the Keskidee Centre, while she was in London to attend a rally in support of South African political prisoners.

Up-and-coming bands such as Misty in Roots and Steel Pulse also played at Keskidee, and in 1978 Bob Marley used the centre to make a video (in which a seven-year-old Naomi Campbell took part along with other children) for his song "Is This Love?"

The Keskidee centre influenced the lives of many local Black youth including the artist, playwright, curator and educator Michael McMillan who visited the centre often as a child.

The Keskidee Centre ran into financial difficulties in the 1980s, and closed in 1991. The building was subsequently taken over by the Christ Apostolic Church.

Oscar Abrams died on 15 February 1996, aged 58.

== Legacy ==
In 2009, The Keskidee was the subject of a BBC Radio 4 programme based on oral history interviews conducted by Alan Dein as part of the King's Cross Voices project.

On 7 April 2011, to celebrate the 40th anniversary of the opening of the Keskidee Centre, an Islington Council heritage green plaque was unveiled on the building, at the time a church, by David Lammy and former resident artist Emmanuel Jegede.

On the night of 8 March 2012, the building was ravaged by fire. The police treated the blaze as suspicious, and the investigation was closed a month later after a Scotland Yard spokesman announced that the police had "exhausted all lines of inquiry".
