= Uzo Egonu =

British-Nigerian artist (1931–1996)

- Born: 25 December 1931; Onitsha, Colonial Nigeria
- Died: 14 August 1996 (aged 64); London, England
- Other name: William Uzo Egonu
- Education: Camberwell School of Arts and Crafts
- Occupation: Artist
- Spouse: Katherine Madge Gee
- Children: 3

Uzo Egonu (Igbo: Ụzọ Egonu; 25 December 1931 – 14 August 1996) was a Nigerian-born artist who settled in Britain in the 1940s, only once returning to his homeland for two days in the 1970s, although he remained concerned with African political struggles.

According to Rasheed Araeen, Egonu was "perhaps the first person from Africa, Asia or the Caribbean to come to Britain after the War with the sole intention of becoming an artist." As critic Molara Wood has written: "Egonu's work merged European and Igbo traditions but more significantly, placed Africa as the touchstone of modernism. In combining the visual languages of Western and African art, he helped redefine the boundaries of modernism, thereby challenging the European myth of the naïve, primitive African artist."

== Career ==
Born in Onitsha, Nigeria, Egonu was in his early teens when in 1945 he first travelled to England. Having already begun to draw while attending Sacred Heart College, Calabar, before leaving for the UK, he eventually studied Fine Arts and Typography at Camberwell School of Arts and Crafts, London, from 1949 to 1952, and went on to participate in a number of exhibitions.

Nigeria had been a British colony since 1914 and Nigerian artists were influenced by Pan-Africanism as well as European art. The Nigerian Civil War influenced Egonu profoundly. Egonu settled in Britain and only visited Nigeria once in 1977. He is credited for merging European modernism with traditional Igbo sculpture and uli wall art. Obiora Udechukwu hailed Egonu as "perhaps Africa's finest painter" and his art was highly regarded by the British Black Art Movement. However, Egonu refused to be categorised.

In 1977, he was among the Black artists and photographers whose work represented the UK at the Second World Festival of Black Arts and African Culture (Festac '77) in Lagos, Nigeria (the others being Winston Branch, Ronald Moody, Mercian Carrena, Armet Francis, Emmanuel Taiwo Jegede, Neil Kenlock, Donald Locke, Cyprian Mandala, Ossie Murray, Sue Smock, Lance Watson and Aubrey Williams). In 1983, the International Association of Art called on Egonu to advise it for the rest of his life, an honour that he shared with such painters and sculptors as Henry Moore, Joan Miró and Louise Nevelson. Egonu was also included in two major 20th-century exhibitions featuring Black British artists: in 1989, the landmark show at London's Hayward Gallery, The Other Story, and seven years later Transforming the Crown, curated by the Caribbean Cultural Center in New York City. He was a member of the Rainbow Art Group, an initiative set up in 1978, which recognized the main problem that exists in relation to the work and aspirations of all ethnic minorities in the art world, including their own.

In later years, Egonu suffered two heart attacks and deteriorating eyesight, and on 14 August 1996 he died in London, at the age of 64.

== Style and legacy ==
The subject of a study by Olu Oguibe entitled Uzo Egonu: An African Artist in the West (1995), Egonu has also often been described as "perhaps Africa's greatest modern painter". Art historian Eddie Chambers has commented on Egonu's "remarkable ability to render landscapes and cityscapes as compelling and fascinating geometrical configurations, each very different in its representational aspects." Egonu's work featured in the 2015–2016 exhibition No Colour Bar: Black British Art in Action 1960–1990 at the Guildhall Art Gallery, City of London.

== Selected exhibitions ==
Solo

- 2004: Uzo Egonu's London, Museum of London, London
- 1997: Uzo Egonu: Past and Present in the Diaspora, InIVA, London
- 1986: Uzo Egonu Now 1986: Stateless People, Royal Festival Hall, London

Group

- 2015: No Colour Bar: Black British Art in Action 1960–1990, Guildhall Art Gallery, London
- 2001: The Short Century, Villa Stuck, Munich, Germany; House of World Cultures, Berlin, Germany
- 1997: Transforming the Crown: African, Asian and Caribbean Artists in Britain 1966–1996, New York City
- 1990: Herbert Art Gallery and Museum, Coventry
- 1989: The Other Story: Afro-Asian Artists in Post-War Britain, Hayward Gallery, London
- 1986: Third World Within, Brixton Art Gallery, London (31 March–22 April)
- 1975: Ljubljana Graphic Art Biennial, Graphic Art Biennial, Ljubljana, Slovenia
- 1973: Commonwealth Institute Art Gallery, London
