= Black Ink Collective =

British publishing company

- Founded: 1978; 47 years ago
- Country of origin: England
- Headquarters location: Brixton, London
- Publication types: Books

Black Ink Collective was a British publishing company founded in 1978 to publish the work of young Black writers in the UK.

The Collective started as a publisher, their first book Black Ink, published in 1978, was an anthology of work by local school pupils. The Collective also established The Black Writers' Workshop, who met weekly at their premises at 258 Coldharbour Lane, Brixton, south London. The writers' workshop incorpated readings, performances and aimed to "incorporate African and Caribbean orality into a Black British poetic voice". The Workshop was attended by writers including Benjamin Zephaniah, S. I. Martin, Desmond Johnson, Fred D'Aguiar and Michael McMillan. Their second book was a play by 16-year-old Michael McMillan, originally performed at the Royal Court Theatre Young Writer's Festival, about the plight of an unemployed school-leaver.

== Selected works ==
- Black Ink - an anthology of plays, poems and prose by young Black Londoners.
- McMillan, Michael. The School Leaver (1978), ISBN 9780950624815
- Wasted Women Friends and Lovers: an anthology by young writers (1978), ISBN 9780950624822
- Black-Eye Perceptions (1981), ISBN 0950624837
- Livingroom (1983), ISBN 0950624845 – anthology with an introduction by John Agard
