= No Colour Bar =

2015–2016 art exhibition

No Colour Bar: Black British Art in Action 1960–1990 was a major public art and archives exhibition, the first of its kind in the UK, held at the Guildhall Art Gallery, City of London, over a six-month period (10 July 2015 – 24 January 2016), with a future digital touring exhibition, and an associated programme of events. No Colour Bar took its impetus from the life work and archives of Jessica Huntley (23 February 1927 – 13 October 2013) and Eric Huntley (born 25 September 1929), Guyanese-born campaigners, political activists and publishers, who founded the publishing company Bogle-L'Ouverture Publications and the associated Walter Rodney Bookshop.

Comprising contemporary fine art combined with archive materials, the multi-media exhibition featured the work of seminal Black British artists and historically significant activists, and was described by Colin Prescod (chair of the Institute of Race Relations) as an "exposition of startling and radical imaginative works, addressing grand British cultural and historical matters, and touching on themes of existential and social restlessness". Participants in the Caribbean Artists Movement, such as Winston Branch, Aubrey Williams, Ronald Moody and Errol Lloyd, were featured together with other prominent artists, including Eddie Chambers, Sonia Boyce, Sokari Douglas Camp, Denzil Forrester and Chila Kumari Burman, with works on display across all media: painting sculpture, painting, drawing, illustration, photography and film. In conjunction with the art and archives, panels and talks led by the exhibition curators, Makeda Coaston and Katty Pearce, and featuring individual artists, writers and publishers, including Eddie Chambers, Errol Lloyd, Emmanuel Taiwo Jegede, Denzil Forrester, Fowokan, Paul Dash, Sokari Douglas Camp, Donald Hinds, Kadija George, Dorothea Smartt, Arif Ali, Sarah White, as well as Eric Huntley himself, were programmed.

Within the exhibition was a purpose-built interactive installation by Michael McMillan, in conjunction with sound and visual specialists Dubmorphology, that recreates the famed Walter Rodney Bookshop, which was formerly located in West Ealing, functioning as a cultural hub of the community until it closed at the beginning of the 1990s.

== Background ==
No Colour Bar took its impetus from the cultural and political work of Guyanese activists Eric and Jessica Huntley, founders of the pioneering Black publishing house Bogle-L'Ouverture Publications (commemorating Caribbean resistance heroes Toussaint L'Ouverture of Haiti and Paul Bogle of Jamaica), whose papers, business and personal, archive materials and collections were deposited in 2005 at London Metropolitan Archives (LMA), the first significant deposit there of records from the African-Caribbean community in London. Funded by the Heritage Lottery Fund, the exhibition is a collaboration between LMA, the Friends of the Huntley Archives at LMA (FHALMA), and the Guildhall Art Gallery, supported by the City of London. The exhibition aimed to provide "an innovative look at Black British cultural identities, heritage and creative voices - and the struggle Black British artists faced to have their voices heard - from the 1960s to the 1990s"; according to project manager Beverley Mason: "To have created this culturally important archive and arts exhibition marks a valuable shift in thinking about the approach to opening up and enlivening archives and historical art collections worldwide."

The exhibition was designed as a multimedia interactive experience, in which "art, sculpture, photographs and paintings can be explored next to letters and other artefacts illustrating how black artists were influenced by the emergence of independent African and Caribbean states, global liberation struggles and the struggle for dignified citizenship within Britain." With four themed areas — Elbow Room, Broad Shoulders, Clenched Fists and Open Arms — the exhibition "challenges visitors to question the meaning of 'black art'".

The installation at its centre (which necessitated the unprecedented covering up of the gallery's largest painting, John Singleton Copley's The Siege of Gibraltar), recreated the bookshop named in honour of assassinated historian Walter Rodney, and served to show something of the connection between the championing of black writers, such as Linton Kwesi Johnson or Lemn Sissay, and the support of black artists — such as Errol Lloyd and George "Fowokan" Kelly — through commissions for book covers, posters, greetings cards or the sale of works of art in the shop.

In addition to running for six months at the Guildhall Art Gallery, the exhibition toured as a digital exhibition and public programme at the Black Cultural Archives, Hackney Museum and the Cubitt Gallery.

== Reception ==
Receiving wide media coverage as a "new ground-breaking revolutionary archive and art exhibition in the heart of the City of London", No Colour Bar was described as "breath-taking" and as showcasing "some of the important aspects of the Black British Experience as well as some of the important figures that helped shape Britain and Black Britain". CNN's Jim Stenman reported on "one of the most comprehensive exhibitions on Black British art in recent years... [that] explores gender, race, representation and politics", interviewing Eric Huntley about the challenges of the past, in addition to Guildhall curator Katty Pearce, who said with reference to the exhibition: "This is part of British art history. This is the other story that maybe doesn't get told enough."

Amandla Thomas-Johnson writing in The Voice pointed out "a very visible tension surrounding the exhibition. Its home, the Guildhall, has been the administrative centre of the City of London for hundreds of year and it was here much of the economic policy that steered the British Empire across the seas was driven, where the wealth coming back from the colonies was dished out and whose permanent art collection is the epitome of Imperial chic." Also highlighting the history of the venue, the New Humanist review by Lola Okolosie found that "holding an exhibition that celebrates black British art at the Guildhall, with its colonial legacy, is an act akin to resistance".

The Soca News review, among others, drew attention to the monthly events linked to the exhibition and different aspects of the Black experience in Britain, including film, music, theatre, poetry, a conference and a Black Artists' Forum, while Artlyst concluded:

"The realisation that Britain was changing forever is no better articulated than through the lens of the pioneers of what was to become Black British cultural heritage. The Huntleys were the publishing powerhouses that spawned a dynamic generation of cultural and political leaders, whose stories are told and celebrated for the first time in the UK at this fascinating exhibition. 2015 sees the 10th Anniversary of the Huntley Archives at the LMA, and 'No Colour Bar: Black British Art in Action 1960-1990' will be a fitting marker and visual record of the socio-cultural dynamics spanning the three decades"

Summing it up as the "Exhibition of the Year", independent curator Hamja Ahsan wrote: "This was an archival show with the fire of life, the air of authenticity and the buzz of a multi-generational community.... For this reason, this remained for me the most essential and inspiring exhibition of the year."

== Exhibition publication ==
- Margaret Busby and Beverley Mason (eds), No Colour Bar: Black British Art in Action 1960–1990, London: Friends of the Huntley Archives at London Metropolitan Archives (FHALMA), 2018, 117 pp. ISBN 978-0-9957300-0-7.

== Artists ==
- Frank Bowling
- Sonia Boyce
- Winston Branch
- Eddie Chambers
- Paul Dash
- Sokari Douglas Camp
- Uzo Egonu
- Denzil Forrester
- Fowokan
- Ras Daniel Heartman
- Lubaina Himid
- Taiwo (Emmanuel) Jegede
- Claudette Johnson
- Tam Joseph
- Kofi Kayiga
- Chila Kumari Burman
- Errol Lloyd
- John Lyons
- Ronald Moody
- Keith Piper
- Aubrey Williams
