= Basil Wallace =

American actor

- Born: January 15, 1951 (age 75); Kingston, Jamaica
- Occupations: Actor, playwright, theatre director, acting teacher
- Years active: 1973–present
- Website: www.basilwallace.com

Basil Wallace (born January 15, 1951) is a Jamaican-American actor, playwright, theatre director, and acting teacher.

== Early life ==
Wallace was born in Kingston and immigrated to the United States as a child with his four siblings. His family first settled in Brooklyn, New York City. He, his parents, and his siblings then moved to Long Island, where he attended Hempstead High School.

== Career ==
Wallace became interested in theater and, after graduating high school, entered New York University. He attended NYU for two years, during which time he performed in his first Off-Off-Broadway play. He went on to work for many years as a playwright, actor, and theatre director in New York.

Early in Wallace's career, he became involved with La MaMa Experimental Theatre Club in Manhattan's East Village. He acted in a production, called "Short Bullins", of four Ed Bullins one-act plays at La MaMa in 1972. The Jarboro Company then took those one-acts (How Do You Do?, A Minor Scene, Dialect Determinism, and It Has No Choice, along with Bullins' Clara's Old Man and Richard Wesley's Black Terror) on tour to Italy. He also acted in Clifford Mason's Sister Sadie, directed by Allie Woods at La MaMa in 1972.

Wallace co-wrote (with Angela Marie Lee) and directed the play Sounds of a Silent Man at La MaMa in 1973, and directed Edgar Nkosi White's Lament for Rastafari at La MaMa in 1977. He returned to La MaMa in 1987 to direct a work-in-progress reading of White's Tres Cepas (The Love Songs for China).

Wallace taught at Lincoln Center Theater for a decade, was the drama director for School District 13 in the Bronx, and was the director of Mini-Mobile Theatre for two years. He was one of the founding members and served as artistic director for the first year of the Caribbean American Repertory Theatre.

In 1990, Wallace moved to Los Angeles and auditioned for the film Marked for Death. He was cast as the lead villain, Screwface. Wallace has continued to act in film and television throughout the 1990s and 2000s.

== Filmography ==
=== Film ===
Year	Title	Role	Notes
1987	Eddie Murphy Raw	Eddie's Father	
1990	Marked for Death	"Screwface"	
1991	Wedlock	"Emerald"	
1991	Grand Canyon	Insurance Salesman	
1992	Rapid Fire	FBI Agent Wesley	
1993	Return of the Living Dead 3	"Riverman"	
1995	Free Willy 2: The Adventure Home	Reporter	
1998	Caught Up	Ahmad	
1999	The Wood	Lisa's Father	
2001	Joy Ride	Car Salesman	
2002	Like Mike	Drill Sergeant Dad	
2006	Blood Diamond	Benjamin Kapanay	
2024	The Geechee Witch: A Boo Hag Story	Jacob	

=== Television ===
Year(s)	Title	Role	Notes
1990	Star Trek: The Next Generation	Klingon Guard #1	Episode 4.7: "Reunion"
1990	China Beach	Rashid	Episode 4.9: "The Call"
1991	Quantum Leap	"Jazz" Boone	Episode 4.10: "Unchained"
1992	Afterburn	Captain Terry "Joker" North	TV film
1993	Sirens	Pacnow	Episode 1.7: "Strike Two"
1994	NYPD Blue	Reginald Harris	Episode 2.2: "For Whom the Skell Rolls"
1995	Children of the Dust	Unknown Role	TV miniseries
1996	Dark Skies	Barney Hill	Episode 1&2: "The Awakening"
1997	Beverly Hills, 90210	Cop #1	Episode 7.17: "Face-Off"
1997	Bloodhounds	Lieutenant Ron Coughlin	TV film
1997	Diagnosis: Murder	William Turner	Episode 4.24: "The Merry Widow Murder"
1997	Soldier of Fortune, Inc.	Unknown Role	Episode 1.9: "Missing in Action"
1998	Born Free	Josef Awaz	8 episodes
1998	Pensacola: Wings of Gold	President Louis Simone	Episode 1.14: "Soldiers of Misfortune"
1998	The Practice	Jerry	Episode 2.21: "In Deep"
1999	ER	Mr. Campbell	Episode 5.17: "Sticks and Stones"
1999	Pacific Blue	Unknown Role	Episode 5.13: "Swimming the Dead Pool"
2000	The Pretender	Sheriff Bowen	Episode 4.8: "Rules of Engagement"
2000	Judging Amy	Reverend Del Mueller	Episode 2.3: "Instincts"
2000	City of Angels	Joe	2 episodes
2001	Any Day Now	Unknown Role	Episode 3.19: "What If?"
2001	The Division	Rupert Taylor	Episode 1.14: "The Parent Trap"
2002	The West Wing	McKonnen Loboko	Episode 3.14: "Night Five"
2002	Philly	Marcus Herman	Episode 1.22: "Mojo Rising"
2002	The Agency	Unknown Role	Episode 2.2: "Air Lex"
2002	Strong Medicine	Ezekiel Monroe-Howard	Episodes 3.12: "Blush"
2003	CSI: Crime Scene Investigation	Principal	Episodes 4.10: "Coming of Rage"
2004	LAX	Fredericks	Episodes 1.7: "Out of Control"
2007	NCIS	Delphin Abaka	Episode 5.8: "Designated Target"
2009	Burn Notice	Claude Laurent	Episode 2.14: "Truth and Reconciliation"
2012	NCIS: Los Angeles	Ed Gornt	Episode 3.14: "Partners"
2013	Eagleheart	Bunju	Episode 2.11: "Bringing Down Bunju"
2021	Christmas in Harmony	Deacon James	TV film
