= Paul Dash =

British painter (born 1946)

- Born: 1946 (age 79–80); Bridgetown, Barbados
- Education: Oxford College of Further Education; Oxford Polytechnic; Goldsmiths, University of London
- Notable work: Foreday Morning

Paul Dash (born 1946) is a Barbados-born artist, educator and writer who in 1957 migrated to Britain, where he was associated with the 1960s Caribbean Artists Movement (CAM), taking part in their meetings and exhibitions. Describing the subject matter of his paintings, Dash has said: "The key themes in my work are street festivals and carnival (mas). It is partly in these popular art forms that African diasporic communities throughout the Americas and elsewhere maintain continuity with African traditions. My identity as an artist is fixed in the fun and spectacle, and ultimately the social and political resistance of mas." His pedagogical writing has been particularly concerned with multicultural and anti-racist art education.

== Biography ==
Paul Dash was born in Bridgetown, Barbados, and migrated to Britain at the age of 11, joining his family in Oxford in 1957. He studied at Oxford College of Further Education and subsequently attended Oxford Polytechnic in Headington.

Since 1965, Dash has lived in London, teaching in secondary schools for more than 20 years. In 1996, he moved to Goldsmiths, University of London, where he was awarded his PhD in 2008. From 2008 to 2011, he was Head of the MA Artist Teacher and Contemporary Practice and supervised PhD research students at Goldsmiths.

Dash was on the editorial team of the International Journal of Art and Design Education from 2001 to 2009. His articles have been published in academic journals such as The International Journal of Art and Design Education, Forum, International Journal of Inclusive Education, as well as in edited collections on art and design education. He is also the author of the book African Caribbean Pupils in Art Education (2010).

He was a member of the black artists movement in the 1970s and 1980s, exhibiting his work in a number of exhibitions (including Caribbean Artists in England at the Commonwealth Institute in 1971, although Eddie Chambers notes that Dash was unlisted). Dash's work was on display at the New English Art Club's Annual Exhibition at the Mall Galleries, London, and, most recently, featured in the 2015 exhibition No Colour Bar: Black British Art in Action 1960–1990 at the Guildhall Art Gallery, City of London.

His autobiography Foreday Morning (BlackAmber Books, 2002) "tells of growing up under the influences of two disparate cultures, a multi-faceted drama that examines the tensions of race and colour in the colonial Caribbean and modern Britain."

== Selected bibliography ==
- Foreday Morning (Foreword by Chris Searle), BlackAmberBooks, 2002. ISBN 978-1901969115. Second edition 2022.
- Social and Critical Practices in Art Education (edited with Dennis Atkinson), Trentham Books, 2005. ISBN 978-1858563114
- African Caribbean Pupils in Art Education, Sense Publishers, 2010. ISBN 978-9460910487
