= Winston Branch =

Saint Lucian artist (born 1947)

Winston Branch OBE
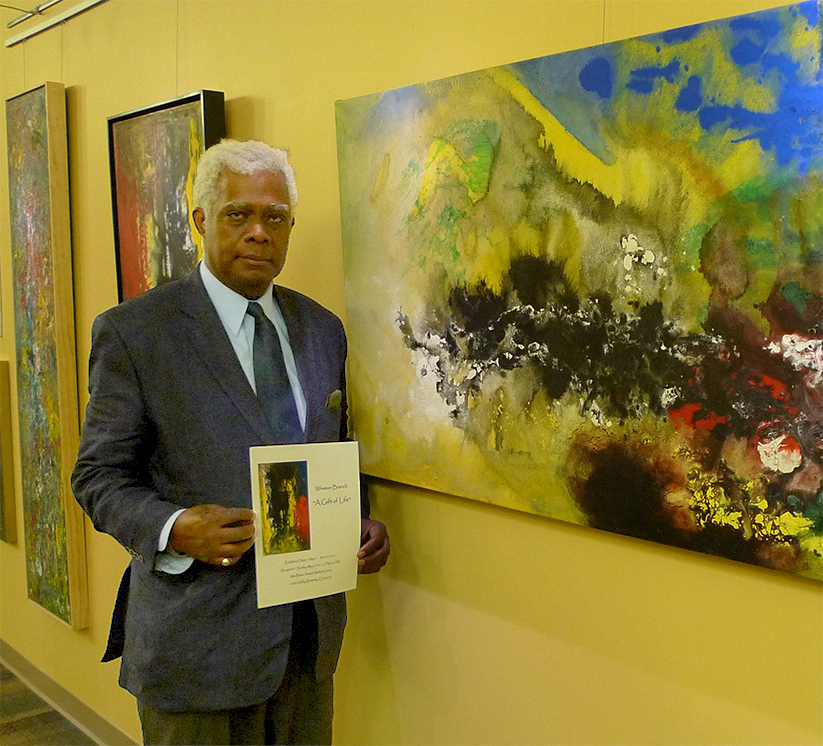
- Branch at his Alta Bates installation
- Born: Castries, Saint Lucia
- Education: British School at Rome, Slade School of Fine Art, University College London
- Occupation: Artist
- Website: winstonbranch.com

Winston Branch OBE (born in 1947) is a British artist originally from Saint Lucia, the sovereign island in the Caribbean Sea. He still has a home there, while maintaining a studio in California. Works by Branch are included in the collections of Tate Britain, the Legion of Honor De Young Museum in San Francisco, California, and the St Louis Museum of Art in Missouri. Branch was the recipient of a Guggenheim Fellowship in 1978, the Rome Prize (British School at Rome), a DAAD (German Academic Exchange Service) Fellowship to Berlin, a sponsorship to Belize from the Organization of American States, and was Artist in Residence at Fisk University in Tennessee. He has been a professor of fine arts and has taught at several art institutions in London and in the US. He has also worked as a theatrical set designer with various theatre groups.

As described by art critic Carlos Diaz Sosa, Branch paints "abstract canvases in cool, cloudy colours that have a quality which allow the viewer to explore the depths of the mind. Branch uses paint like a symbol, a purely aesthetic language, an illustration of spirit."

== Early years and education ==
Born in Castries, Saint Lucia, Branch attended a Catholic school there, before being sent to London at the age of 12 in the 1960s. He explains: "My parents saw I had an aptitude for art and wanted to give me the best opportunity." He studied at the Slade School of Fine Art, University College London, where his talent was recognized early, and after graduating in 1970 he won the prestigious Rome Prize, enabling him at the age of 24 to attend the British School at Rome for a year (1971–72). Critic Amon Saba Saakana notes: "Branch had a first hand experience of the Renaissance masters and subsequent developments of art movements in Europe. And though he ingested these European masters, he was searching for a form that incorporated and reflected his beginnings in the Caribbean. Though first working in the figurative tradition, he moved to abstracts as he apprehended the world of colour reflected in the cosmos, lightning, volcanoes, tropical storms, and earthquakes."

== Teaching ==
In 1971, Branch was a visiting tutor at Hornsey College of Art and at Goldsmiths College of Art, London University. His first visit to the US was as Artist-in-Residence at Fisk University, Nashville, Tennessee, in 1973, and in the UK between 1973 and 1992 he also taught at Kingston School of Art, Chelsea Art School and at the Slade School. He was a professor of art at the University of California, Berkeley, and at Kansas State University.

He has also given several public lectures, including at Oakland Museum of California, at the Beach Museum of Art, Kansas State University, and at Barrows Hall, University of California at Berkeley.

== Painting ==
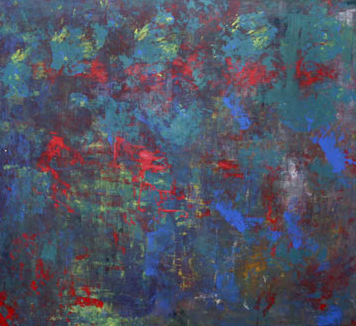
In The Blue Light

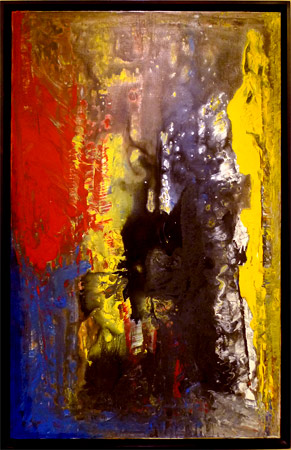
The Coming of Autumn by Winston Branch

Branch has exhibited his work consistently since the 1960s, including at the Oakland Museum of California, the Alliance Francaise de San Francisco, the permanent collection of the Berkeley Art Museum, the 11th and 23rd São Paulo Art Biennial, Museo de Arte Moderno in São Paulo, the 4th Bienal de Pincture de Cuenca, Modern Art Museum (Cuenca, Ecuador) and the Biennale de Paris, Musée National d'Art Moderne and the John F. Kennedy Center for the Performing Arts.

In 2010 he fell ill while at San Francisco International Airport waiting for a flight in order to exhibit work and give a lecture at the Museum of Modern Art in Santo Domingo, Dominican Republic, and was cared for at the Alta Bates Summit Medical Center, where following his recovery he held an exhibition entitled A Gift of Life (1 May–24 June 2011). He has subsequently spent more time in London, where he has a close longtime association with the Chelsea Arts Club.

Most recently, he was one of the artists featured prominently in No Colour Bar: Black British Art in Action 1960–1990 (July 2015–January 2016) at the City of London's Guildhall Art Gallery, with three of his paintings hung at the entrance of the exhibition. One of the works shown was his painting West Indian — "a marked exception" to the non-figurative style now more typical of Branch — on loan from Rugby Borough Council's respected collection of 20th- and 21st-century British art, which also includes works by L. S. Lowry, Barbara Hepworth, Stanley Spencer and Bridget Riley.

From early on in his career, Branch's work has won recognition and awards, such as the British Rome Prize in 1971, a DAAD (German Academic Exchange Service) Fellowship to Berlin in 1976, and a Guggenheim Fellowship in 1978 (in which year he was featured in the international quarterly journal Black Art).

His paintings are in public and private collections. Several are in St. Lucia, Germany and France: the British Museum, The Brooklyn Museum, The Arts Council of Great Britain, Sinclair Research Limited (United Kingdom), Victoria and Albert Museum, John Simon Guggenheim Memorial Foundation, Sprint World Headquarters Campus, and Her Majesty's Military Government (Berlin, Germany).

== Exhibitions ==
=== Individual shows ===
- 2011: Winston Branch: A Gift of Life, Alta Bates Summit Medical Center, Berkeley, CA.
- 2009: Robert Mondavi Winery Exhibition, Napa, California
- 2004: Alliance Française de San Francisco, California
- 2003: Alliance Française, Los Angeles, California
- 2001: Willard Hall, Kansas State University, Kansas
- 2000: Alliance Française, San Francisco, California
- 1999: Townsend Center for the Humanities, University of California at Berkeley
- 1998: 150th Anniversary of the Abolition of Slavery in the French Antilles, Alliance Française, Castries, St. Lucia
- 1997: Clink Wharf Gallery, London
- 1996: Dunnottar School, Castries, St. Lucia
- 1994: Belize Arts Council, Belize
- 1994: Department of Museums, Belmopan, Belize
- 1994: Alliance Française, Roseau, Dominica
- 1994: Sir Arthur Lewis Community College, Castries. St. Lucia
- 1993: National Commercial Bank, Castries, St. Lucia
- 1992: Alliance Française, Castries, St. Lucia
- 1987: Jersey Arts Council, Bernie Gallery, Channel Isles
- 1985: Artist's Open Studio, Whitfield Place, London
- 1984: Joanna Lonsdale, London
- 1983; Lady Marabelle Kelly, Carlyle Square, London
- 1977; Hochschule der Künste, Berlin
- 1976: Galerie Richter, Berlin
- 1975: Winston Branch, Terry Dintenfass Gallery, New York.
- 1973: Fisk University, Carl van Vechten Gallery, Nashville, Tennessee
- 1969: Winston Branch with Felix Topolski, St Martin-in-the-Fields, London
- 1967: Winston Branch Paintings & Drawings, Arts Lab Gallery, Drury Lane, London

=== Group shows ===
- 2018: About Face, Portraits from the National Portrait Gallery, The Lowry and Rugby Collection, Rugby Art Gallery and Museum, Rugby, UK
- 2018: The 30th London Art Fair, Business Design Center, London
- 2017: Maxes, Bankside Gallery, London
- 2015–16: No Colour Bar: Black British Art in Action 1960–1990, Guildhall Art Gallery, London.
- 2013–14: Crosscurrents: Africa and Black Diaspora in Dialogue 1960–1980, Museum of the African Diaspora.
- 2010: 1 International Caribbean Triennial (Primera Trienal Internacional del Caribe), Dominican Republic.
- 2004–05: Alitask KeBede Gallery, Los Angeles, California
- 2003–04: 4th Bienal de Pintura del Caribe y Centroamerica, Muséo de Arte Moderno, Santo Domingo, Dominican Republic
- 2003: Seventeen Bay Area Artists, Joyce Gordon Gallery, Oakland, California
- 2002: Being There: 45 Oakland Artists, Museum of California, Oakland
- 2001: Art Faculty Exhibition, Kansas State University, Wamego, Kansas
- 2000: 1st Bienal Argentina de Grafica Latinoamericaana, Muséo Nacional del Grabado, Argentina
- 1999–2000: Urban Life in the Caribbean, Museum of the National Pantheon, Port-au-Prince, Haiti (Travelling exhibition)
- 1999: Faculty of Art Practice, University of California at Berkeley
- 1998: Caribe: exclusion, fragmentacion y paraiso, Muséo Extremoeno e Iberomericano de Arte Contemporaneo, Badajoz, Madrid,
- 1998: XXXeme Festival International de Peinture, Cagnes-sur-Mer, France
- 1998: XII Bienal de San Juan del Grabado Latinoamericano y del Caribe, Puerto Rico
- 1997: V Salon of Drawing of Santo Dominigo, Dominican Republic
- 1997: Transforming the Crown: African, Asian and Caribbean Artists in Britain, 1966–1996, Studio Museum in Harlem, New York
- 1997: Caribe Entranable, Ultimo Arte, Santo Domingo, Dominican Republic
- 1997: Exhibition and auction of Contemporary Art for SOS Children's Villages in Thessaloniki, Greece
- 1996: 23rd Bienal of Sao Paulo, Muséo de Arte Moderno, Sao Paulo, Brazil
- 1996: 3rd Bienal de Pintura del Caribe y Centroamerica, Muséo de Arte Moderno, Santo Domingo, Dominican Republic
- 1995: Africa95, Prints and Photographs by Artists of African Descent, Victoria and Albert Museum, London
- 1994: 2nd Bienal de Pintura del Caribe y Centroemerica, Muséo de Arte Moderno, Santo Domingo, Dominican Republic
- 1994: 4th Bienal de Pinture de Cuenca, Modern Art Museum, Cuenca, Ecuador
- 1994: Indigo 94, Pointe-a-Pitre, Guadeloupe
- 1994: 4th Annual International Art Exhibition and Auction, Sotheby's, The John F. Kennedy Center for the Performing Arts, Washington, DC.
- 1993: St. Lucia National Trust Collection, Castries, St. Lucia
- 1992: Les Afros Americains et L'Europe, Paris
- 1991: Auction, Modern and Contemporary Paintings, Watercolours, Drawings and Sculpture, Christie's South Kensington, London
- 1991: Recent Acquisitions of the Contemporary Art Society, James Major Gallery, London
- 1991: The Chelsea Arts Club Auction, 20th Century Paintings, Drawings and Sculpture, Sotheby's London
- 1986: Artists of Promise and Renown, University of Warwick, UK
- 1982: Biennale de Paris, Musée d'Art Moderne, Paris
- 1981: British Artists in Berlin, Goethe Institute, London
- 1980: British School in Rome, South London Art Gallery, London
- 1979: Modern International Graphix IX, Lubeck, Germany
- 1978: Year of Child Traveling Exhibition, Poland, Holland, Mexico, Japan
- 1977: 2nd World Festival of African Arts and Culture, Lagos, Nigeria
- 1976: Terry Dintenfass Gallery, Summer Group Show, New York
- 1979: Freie Berliner Kunstausstellung, Berlin
- 1976: Kutztown State College, Pennsylvania, USA
- 1976: Glassboro State College, New Jersey, USA
- 1975: Ruth S. Schaffner Gallery, Los Angeles, USA
- 1971: Carifesta, Georgetown, Guyana
- 1971: 11th Bienal of Sao Paulo, Muséo de Arte Moderno, Sao Paulo, Brazil
- 1971: Salon des Jeunes Peintures, Grand Palais, Paris
- 1971: Recent Acquisitions of the Contemporary Art Society, Gulbenkian Hall, Royal College of Art, London
- 1971: Caribbean Artists in England, Commonwealth Institute, London
- 1970: Young British Painters, UK Travelling Exhibition
- 1970: Young Generation of British Painters, USA Traveling Exhibition
- 1969: Carifta Expo, Grenada, West Indies
- 1969: Exposition Contemporaire des Villes, Jumelles d'esch sur Alzette, France
- 1969: Young Artists from the Commonwealth, Royal Commonwealth Society, London
- 1969: National Arts Students Exhibition, Roundhouse, London
- 1969: London Group, Royal Institute Galleries, London
- 1967: Art Colleges Exhibition, FBA Galleries, London
- 1966: University of London Union, London
- 1966: Luton International Arts Council, Bedford, UK
- 1966: Whitechapel Library, London

== Awards and honours ==
- 2024: Appointed Officer of the Order of the British Empire (OBE) in the 2024 Birthday Honours for services to the creative and fine arts.
- 2020: Honorary Doctor of Arts, HonDArt, University of Greenwich London, UK
- 1996: Purchase award by the 23rd Bienal de São Paulo
- 1995: Mural – Hewanorra International Airport, St. Lucia
- 1994: Organization of American States sponsorship to Belize
- 1978: John Simon Guggenheim Memorial Fellowship in Painting
- 1977: Represented UK at 2nd World Festival of African Arts and Culture, Lagos, Nigeria
- 1976: Artists-in-Berlin Programme (Berliner Kunsler Programme des DAAD)
- 1973: British Council Award
- 1971: Brazilian Government sponsorship to the 11th Bienal de São Paulo, Brazil
- 1971: British Prix de Rome, Italy
- 1970: Boise Traveling Scholarship

== Select bibliography ==
- 2004: Peter Selz, Ronald Alley, Alliance Française, San Francisco, California. 27 March
- 2002: "Being There: 45 Oakland Artists" Museum of California, Oakland
- 2000: Marianne de Tolentino, "Urban Life in the Caribe" Muséo del Pantéon National, Art Nexus, May 2000, #36
- 2000: Jan Biles, "Inner Vision Drives Artist", Lawrence Journal-World, 9 November 2000
- 2000: Jennifer Detweiler, "Sharing His Art", The Manhattan Mercury, Sunday, 8 October 2000
- 1999: Wendy Martin, "A Matter of Survival – Portrait of Winston Branch", Women's Studies, No. 3, Volume 28, ISSN 0049-7878
- 1999: Julia Sommer, Berkeleyan, "Painter Winston Branch – Visiting Artist Shares His 'Great Love' for Painting & education", August 1999, ISSN 0885-3142
- 1998: Ronald Alley, 30th Festival International de La Peinture, Cagnes-Sur-Mer, France, Cat. 1988–1999
- 1998: Maria Lluisa Borras and Antonio Zaya, Casa de America, Caribe Insular, Exclusion, Fragmentaçion y Paraiso, Madrid, Spain, Cat. 1998
- 1998: Vlad, "Winston Branch ou les Métaphores de la Liberté", Frances-Antilles Magazine: Arts Plastiques, Saturday, 30 May–5 June 1998
- 1997: Holland Cotter, "This Realm of Newcomer, This England", The New York Times, 24 October 1997
- 1997: Mora Beauchamp Byrd, Transforming the Crown, ISBN 09654082-0-5
- 1996: André Chahot, 23rd Bienal International Sao Paulo, "The Inner Landscape", Cat. 1996
- 1996: Caroline Popovic, "The Precarious Life of Art", B.W.I.A. Caribbean Beat, November–December 1995
- 1994: André Chapot, Alliance Française de Roseau, Dominica
- 1993: Winston Branch, "In Search of the Green Banana", Evening Standard, 27 January 1993
- 1992: Anne Walmsley, The Caribbean Artists Movement: A Literary and Cultural History, 1966–1971, London and Port of Spain: New Beacon Books, ISBN 978-1873201060
- 1992: Ferdinand Dennis, "Ferdinand Dennis in Conversation with Winston Branch", BBC Radio Forum Work Talk, November 1992
- 1992: Michael Fabre, Los Afro Americains et L'Europe (catalogue), Paris: Galerie d'Art Noir Contemporain
- 1988: This is London, "Artist Opens City Studio", No. 1708, 30 June 1988
- 1987: Rod McLoughlin, "Exploring the Depths", Jersey Evening Post, Friday, 8 May 1987
- 1982: Carlos Diaz Sosa, 12th Biennale de Paris, "The Light in the Colors", Museé de Art Moderne de la Ville de Paris, Cat. 1982
- 1981: Goethe Institute, "Two Decades of the DAAD's British Artists in Berlin", London, November 1981
- 1978: David Simolke, "Winston Branch – A Study in Contrast", Black Art International Quarterly, Volume 2, No. 2, 1978
- 1978: Bernd Lubowski, "Ich Lasse Mich von Kimt der Stadt beein Flussen", Berliner Morgenpost, 3 December 1978, #282/81. JAHRG
- 1977: Jules Walter, "Winston Branch Painting 1976-77", DAAD: Hochschule der Kunst, Berlin, 1977
- 1977: Peter Hans Gopfert, "Malerische Dialoge Zwischen Kalkul und Phantasie", Die Welt, Tuesday, 12 July 1977-B NR 159/28W
- 1976: Was ist Wann?, "Winston Branch: Guest of Berlin DAAD", #6, Vol. 15.5–15.8, 1976
- 1973: Dr David C. Driskell, "The Recent Paintings of Winston Branch", The Carl Van Vechten Gallery, Department of Art, Fisk University, Nashville, Tennessee, October 1973
- 1973: Clara Hieronymus, "Major Show At Fisk", The Tennessean, Sunday, 14 October 1973
