= Edgar Nkosi White =

Montserratian playwright and author (born 1947)

- Born: 1947 (age 77–78); Montserrat
- Education: City College of New York; Yale School of Drama; New York Theological Seminary
- Occupations: Playwright; poet
- Notable work: Lament for Rastafari; I Marcus Garvey; Trinity: The Long and Cheerful Road to Slavery
- Website: www.peepaltreepress.com/authors/edgar-nkosi-white

Edgar Nkosi White (born 1947) is a Montserratian playwright and author who has written more than 40 plays and novels. His work has been performed internationally.

== Early life ==
White was born in April 1947 on the Caribbean island of Montserrat, where he attended Cork Hill primary school. In 1952, he moved to Harlem, New York City, and went to Theodore Roosevelt High School. As a student, he attended City College of New York from 1964-1965 and then New York University. From 1971 to 1973 he studied at the Yale University School of Drama, where he established a theatre company, the Yale Black Players, and was expelled by the school authorities. Later in life, he attended New York Theological Seminary.

== Plays and poetry ==
White's first play, The Mummer's Play, was produced by Joseph Papp and staged at The Public Theater in 1965, when White was 18 years old. As a high school student, White's writing career began after he won a poetry competition in New York. One of the judges there was the poet Langston Hughes, who later inspired White to publish his first book collection of plays Underground, in 1970.

His play Lament for Rastafari was directed by Basil Wallace at Ellen Stewart's Café La MaMa Theatre in March and April 1977. This led to productions in England both on stage at the Keskidee Arts Centre in London, and as a BBC radio drama. A production of White's play I Marcus Garvey toured Canada in 2011–2012.

From 2010 to 2011, White was library writer in residence at the City College Library of the City University of New York, where he continued to write new prose and poetry, including essays on Langston Hughes (Trance) and Ellen Stewart (Ellen). In Ellen, White recalls how he was dared to write his first play by Martin Sheen; and Sheen then presented the play, Mummers, to Joe Papp.

In 2015, White published an autobiographical collection of essays and memories, Deported to Paradise, which uses his experiences of growing up on Montserrat, and in New York, as a starting point for discussions of wide-ranging themes around inequality, corporations, consumerism and the state of the world. Some of these essays have been published independently - for example, in 2016 White shared In the Ghut in celebration of the birthday of the Premier of Montserrat, Donaldson Romeo.

== Selected published works ==
=== Books ===
- Omar at Christmas (1973), Lothrop, Lee and Shepard.
- Children of Night (1974), Lothrop, Lee & Shepard.
- The Rising: A Novel (1988), Marion Boyars Publishers. Set on a small Caribbean island, this novel spans a year in the life of a young boy, who slowly comes to realise that it is the women who hold the true power.
- Deported to Paradise: Essays and Memories (1995), Peepal Tree Press.

=== Plays ===
- Underground: Four Plays (1970). New York: William Morrow and Company. This contains the plays The Burghers of Calais, Fun in Lethe or The Feast of Misrule, The Mummers Play and The Wonderfull Yeare.
- The Crucificado (1972). New York: William Morrow.
- Lament for Rastafari and other plays (1983). Marion Boyars Publishers. This contains the plays Lament for Rastafari, Like them that dream (Children of Ogun), and Trinity - the long and cheerful road to slavery.
- Redemption Song and other plays (1985). Marion Boyars Publishers. This comprises Redemption Song, The Boot Dance and Les Femmes Noires.
- The Nine Night (1983). London: Methuen.

Listings of all of his plays staged in British theatres are maintained in the Black Plays Archive.
