= Alliance Française de San Francisco =

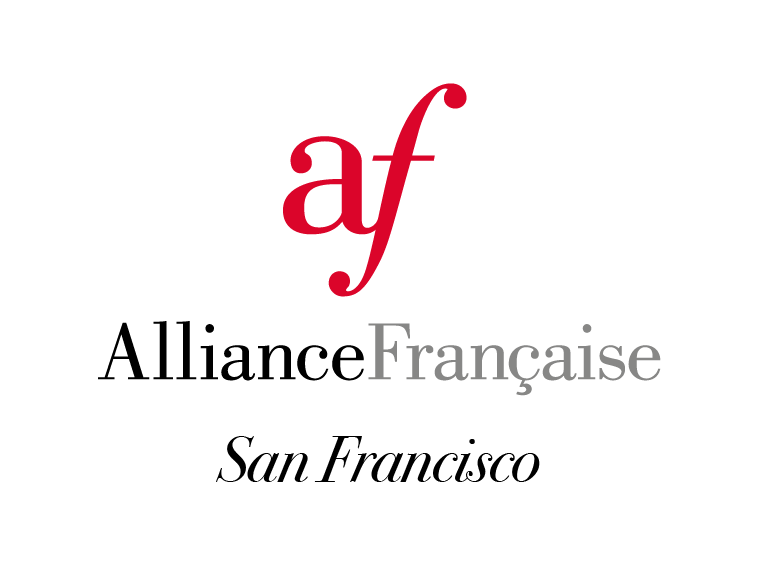
- Type: French cultural and language center
- Established: 1889
- Founder: Xavier Méfret
- President: Fred Thomas Aden
- Director: Noëmie Herail
- Students: 1,500 (2014)
- Location: San Francisco, United States
- Website: https://www.afsf.com/

== Introduction ==
Founded in 1889, The Alliance Française of San Francisco (AFSF) is a 501(c)3 nonprofit organization dedicated to promoting the French language and francophone cultures in San Francisco and the Bay Area.

AFSF offers French classes for adults, children, and teenagers as well as business classes and summer camps. It's The exam center for French language in the Bay Area.

It's the oldest Alliance Française in the US. The AFSF is an independent local entity and is not subsidized by any government, relying on student and membership fees.

== Activities and Services ==
=== Language Classes ===
The AFSF offers a range of classes and individual instruction for learning French, from beginners (A1) with no previous knowledge of the language to advanced students (C1), both in person and online . The curriculum used conforms to the Common European Framework of Reference for Languages. The AFSF developed its own online platform, currently accessible for levels A1 and A2 and plans to extend to higher levels in the future .

Class sizes range from 4 to 12 students and are taught by native speakers. In addition, courses on French literature, pronunciation, culture and civilization are regularly offered in French.

=== Corporate classes ===
The AFSF offers tailored corporate programs.

=== Programs for Children and Teens ===
The AFSF offers after-school programs, Saturday classes for children and teenagers and summer camps for children.

=== Exam Center ===
The AFSF periodically administers language proficiency exams including the TCF, ESIT and DAEFLE and will offer DELF/DALF Exams starting in 2022.

=== Cultural activities ===
The AFSF offers workshops and events throughout the year. Since March 2019, a variety of online activities are also available.

=== Film Series/ Movie Night ===
French-language films are shown the first Tuesday evening of the month in the theater; screenings are free but a donation is appreciated.

=== Music Festivals & Big events ===
March is dedicated to Francophonie month with several events every year. The AFSF participates each year in the Fete de la Musique (Make Music Day) global music festival, showcasing a wide variety of musicians in live performance.

The AFSF used to also host a holiday event (christmas market, christmas party). It plans to return in 2022.

=== Partnerships ===
The AFSF partners every year with local organizations and film festivals to promote francophone cultures.

=== AFSF Library ===
The AFSF library was founded in the 1870s and is open to the public. Several thousand books for adults and children form the core of the collection, as well as hundreds of DVDs, and French comics. Members and students have borrowing privileges in addition to access to Culturetheque, an online library.

=== Art Exhibits ===
The atrium of the building regularly features works by local and visiting artists.

== History ==
In the aftermath of the 1870 Franco-Prussian War, France's image began to decline, while that of Germany was enhanced. To counteract this, a number of prominent French citizens met in Paris in 1883 to create an association promoting French language, culture, and history. The new Alliance Francaise soon became an organization embodying the French Republican ideal of meritocracy.

=== Birth of the French community in San Francisco ===
After the Gold Rush began, San Francisco grew in population from 800 in 1847 to 23,000 in 1852, while the French population grew to more than 20,000 statewide. Emigration to California was spurred by the government-created Loterie des Lingots d'or, a project to send unwanted individuals to San Francisco as gold seekers. In addition, after the 1851 coup d'état by Napoleon III, many people were exiled to California. In later years, around 120,000 immigrants from Béarn or Basque country arrived in America between 1820 and 1926; many settled in San Francisco Bay Area.

=== History of the Alliance of San Francisco ===
The San Francisco chapter was founded in 1889, supported by the Société Française de Bienfaisance Mutuelle. The Ligue Nationale Française made a donation in the 1890s of 12,000 books, some still held by the organization to this day. The first French classes were held at 414 Mason street; by 1904, the association had 800 members and offered 28 types of classes with 600 students. The 1906 San Francisco earthquake destroyed the building's foundations and many students were killed. In 1910, only 550 students were registered, growing to 700 three years later. The AFSF also developed the Débat Joffre (Joffre Debate) to organize a verbal jousting forum for students from Stanford University and the University of California at Berkeley, debates which were made independent of the AFSF in 1949. The 1950s was a relatively prosperous period in which new technologies were available, including long-playing records and weekly French movie screenings. Two satellite chapters in Redwood City and Palo Alto were established, and in 1972 the AFSF's executive director developed a "Junior Alliance". The AFSF reached a thousand members and students, maintaining strong links with sister chapters in Berkeley, Saratoga and Monterey. In the 1980s the AFSF joined the Ligue Henri IV, an association created in 1895 by the large Béarnais community in San Francisco. In 1985, the AFSF relocated to a building on Bush Street owned by the Ligue and designed in 1910 by prominent Bay Area architect Willis Polk.

=== Executive Directors ===
- Alain Marquer 1990–1996
- Paul Fournel 1996–1999
- Michel Richard 1999–2002
- Pascal Ledermann 2002–2004 (acting executive director)
- Patrick Girard 2004–2005
- Grégorie Douet-Lasne 2005–2006
- Peter Dewees 2006–2008
- Ben Daoudi 2008–2009
- Pascal Ledermann 2009–2018
- Noëmie Herail 2018-present
