= East Village, Kansas City =

Neighborhood in Kansas City, Missouri

Coordinates: 39°06′08″N 94°34′36″W

East Village is an area in Downtown Kansas City, Missouri, located northeast of City Hall and east of Ilus W. Davis Park.

The area, which is set around 11th Street and Locust Avenue, will be the new headquarters for the J.E. Dunn Construction Group and other Village East development, including residences and commercial space.

The area was one of three sites under consideration for construction of the Kansas City Royals' new baseball stadium. The nearby Crossroads district was also considered as the stadium site, which was voted down by Jackson County, Missouri, taxpayers during the election on April 2, 2024.
