= Aspiria =

Building in Overland Park, Kansas

Coordinates: 38.918881°N 94.658398°W

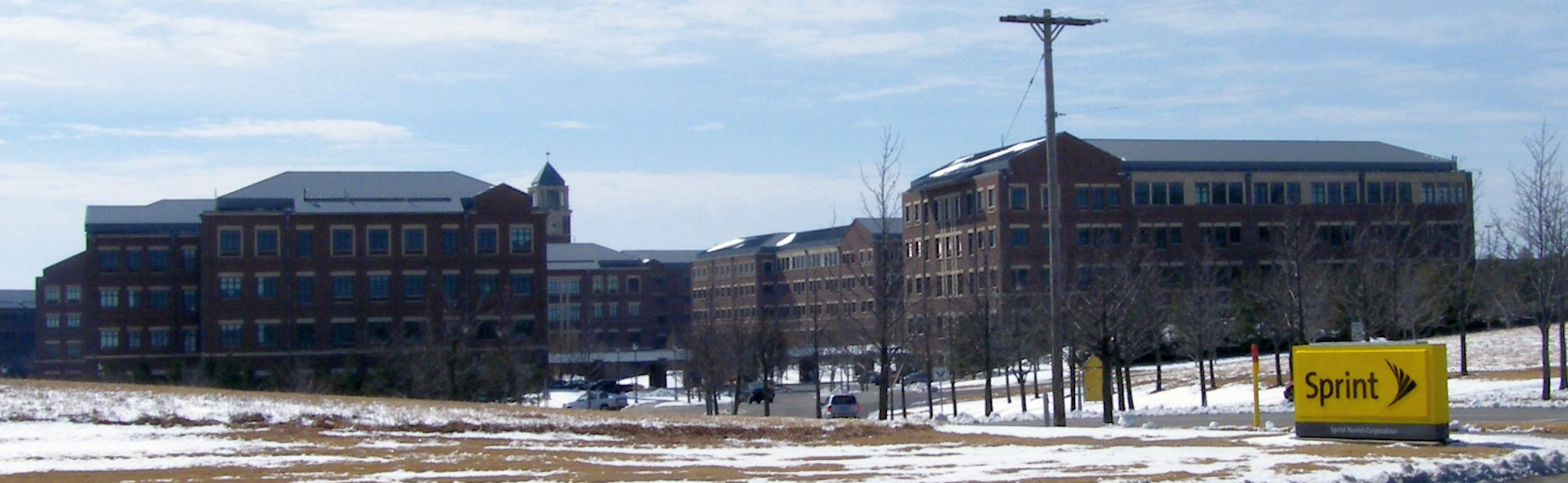
Aspiria campus

Aspiria (formerly the Sprint World Headquarters) is a corporate campus consisting of 17 buildings encompassing 3,900,000-square-foot (360,000 m^{2}) on 200 acres in Overland Park, Kansas that formerly housed the world headquarters of Sprint Corporation, an American telecom company.

The buildings were designed by Hillier Architecture (which became RMJM in 2007) based on a theme which Sprint dubbed the "University of Excellence." RMJM had also designed the Basking Ridge, New Jersey headquarters campus of the AT&T Corporation (now the headquarters of Verizon Wireless).

The first buildings opened in 1997 as Sprint consolidated operations in 50 buildings in the Kansas City metropolitan area. Most of the buildings are four and five stories tall with the tallest structure being a 175-foot (53 m) clock tower. Included on the campus are an amphitheater for 3,000 people; parking garages for 12,500 cars; athletic fields, and hiking and biking trails with 6,000 trees that connect to public trails outside the campus. 60 percent of the land area was left green. At the time a Sprint official said Sprint opted for a low rise building rather than a tall structure because "communication doesn't happen as well when offices are vertical instead of horizontal." When it was built it was described as the largest office complex in the Midwest.

The building was enabled in 1989 when Overland Park gave the company a property tax abatement that called for 50 percent property tax abatement for 10 years and the remaining 50 percent paid initially over 20 years. Overland Park issued $1 billion in revenue bonds in 1997. The abatement expired in 2013.

The campus was designed to accommodate 14,500 employees and it reached its maximum capacity at the time of the Nextel-Sprint merger in 2004. Since then Sprint has been downsizing with 11,000 employees (7,300 Sprint employees, the rest contractors) in the complex in 2010. The headquarters for the merged company was consolidated in the building in 2008 when staff moved from Reston, Virginia.

In 2009 Sprint began subleasing portions of the complex allocating 800,000 square feet (74,000 m^{2}) to other companies starting with Sprint spin off Embarq (it eventually moved its headquarters to a different building outside the complex) Other subtenants include JPMorgan Retirement Plan Services which moved 800 employees to the complex from its offices on Ward Parkway in December 2009.

Other companies in the complex are Apria and CareCentrix with call centers there. KeyBank Real Estate Capital is also moving to the complex. Sprint has announced plans to rebrand the campus including renaming a street from Sprint Parkway to Outlook to accommodate JPMorgan and rebrand the name on the entrances.

== Sale ==
In March 2019, Sprint sold the Sprint World Headquarters Campus to Occidental Management, Inc. At that time, Sprint leased space for employees to continue to work from on the campus. Following an April 2020 merger between Sprint and T-Mobile, T-Mobile chose to continue leasing office space on the campus. T-Mobile put a combined $36.7 million into updates for buildings on the campus throughout the first seven months of 2021, while also maintaining the original T-Mobile headquarters of Bellevue, Washington. The new owner, Occidental Management, Inc., announced that the former Sprint World Campus would be renamed Aspiria, effective January 1, 2021.
