= Nina Edge =

English ceramicist, feminist and writer (born 1962)

- Born: 1962 (age 63–64)
- Occupations: Ceramicist, feminist and writer
- Website: ninaedge.co.uk

Nina Edge (born 1962) is an English ceramicist, feminist and writer.

== Life ==
Nina Edge's mother is Ugandan-Asian and her father is English. She trained in ceramics in Cardiff, Wales.

Edge participated in Jagrati, a 1986 exhibition at Greenwich Citizens Gallery by thirteen Asian women artists. Her mixed-media artwork Snakes and Ladders (1988) used batik on paper, ceramic and text. Part of the touring exhibition Along the Lines of Resistance, it "brought social politics into craft and images of black women into mainstream art galleries and museums".

== Works ==
=== Exhibitions ===
- Jagrati, Greenwich Citizens Gallery, London, 1986. With Dushka Ahmed, Symrath Patti, Zarina Bhimji, Sutapa Biswas, Chila Kumari Burman, Bhajan Hunjan, Naomi Imy, Mumtaz Karimjee, Shamina Khanour, Sukhwinder Saund, Ranjan Shadra, and Shanti Thomas.
- Along the Lines of Resistance, Cooper Gallery, Barnsley, 1988. With Simone Alexander, Sonia Boyce, Chila Kumari Burman, Leslie Hakim-Dowek, Lubaina Himid & Maud Sulter, Lesley Sanderson, Marlene Smith, and Mona Hatoum.
- Black Art: Plotting the Course, Oldham Art Gallery, Oldham (and toured to Camden Arts Centre, London) 1988. With Said Adrus, Upjohn Aghaji, Georgia Belfont, Donald Brown, Val Brown, Isaiah Ferguson, Amanda Holiday, Carol Hughes, Wendy Jarrett, Tam Joseph, Godfrey Lee, Errol Lloyd, John Lyons, Julia Millette, Mowbray Odonkor, Paul Ogbonno, Eugene Palmer, Tony Phillips, Ray Povey, Jaswinder Singh Purewal, Alistair Raphael, Lesley Sanderson, Mark Sealy, Gurminder Sikand, Shanti Thomas, and Jan Wandja.
- A Table of Four, Bluecoat Gallery, Liverpool, 1991. With Bhajan Hunjan, Tehmina Shah, Veena Stephenson,
- The Circular Dance, Arnolfini, Bristol, 1992. With Sutapa Biswas, Chila Kumari Burman, Jagjit Chuhan, Gurminder Sikand and Shanti Thomas.
- Crossing Black Waters, City Gallery, Leicester, 1992. With Said Adrus, Allan deSouza, Bhajan Hunjan, Manjeet Lamba, Shaheen Merali and Samena Rana.
- Fine Material for a Dream...?: A Reappraisal of Orientalism: 19th & 20th Century Fine Art and Popular Culture Juxtaposed with Paintings, Video and Photography by Contemporary Artists, Harris Museum & Art Gallery, Preston, 1992 . With Jananne Al-Ani, Sutapa Biswas, Chila Kumari Burman, Sunil Gupta, Mona Hatoum, Sunil Janah, Mumtaz Karimjee, Hani Muthar, Gurminder Sikand, Elia Suleiman & Joyce Salloum, and Mitra Tabrizian,
- Trophies of Empire: New Art Commissions in Bristol, Hull, and Liverpool, Liverpool, 1992. With Keith Piper, Sunil Gupta, Rita Keegan, Juginder Lamba, Shaheen Merali, Donald Rodney, Veena Stephenson and Bandele lyapo.
- Ethnic Cleansing, installation at John Moore Gallery, Liverpool, 1994.
- Mirage: Enigmas of Race and Desire, Institute of Contemporary Arts in association with Iniva, 1995. With Isaac Julien, Sonia Boyce, Eddie George, Trevor Mathison, Steve McQueen, Keith Khan, Susan Lewis and Ronald Fraser-Munro.
- Transforming the Crown, Studio Museum in Harlem, 1997.
- The Fifth Floor, Tate Liverpool, 2008.
- The Shared Habitat, Granby Winter Garden, Liverpool, 2018.

=== Writing ===
- "Your Name is Mud", in Maud Sulter, ed., Passion: Discourses on Blackwomen's Creativity. Hebden Bridge: Urban Fox Press, 1990, pp. 154–167.
- "Eight Ways to Speak", Third Text, Vol. 10, No. 34 (Spring 1996), pp. 103–107. Review of The Seed the Root, a series of installations and performances in Brick Lane and Spitalfields Market by Moti Roti
- "Off Limits: Cultural Participation and Art Education", International Journal of Art and Design Education, Vol. 33, No. 3 (2014), pp. 301–12
