= List of Black British artists =

This is a list of Black British artists, born in or associated with the UK, who are notable in visual arts as designers, painters, photographers and sculptors.

== A ==
- Faisal Abdu'Allah (born 1969)
- Kesewa Aboah (born 1994)
- Larry Achiampong (born 1984)
- Brenda Agard (1961–2012)
- Ajamu X (born 1963)
- John Akomfrah (born 1957)
- Pearl Alcock (1934–2006)
- Hurvin Anderson (born 1965)
- Eugene Ankomah (born 1978)
- Michael Armitage (artist) (born 1984)
- Martina Attille (born 1959)

== B ==
- Chris Baker (born 1960)
- Kwame Bakoji-Hume (born 1970)
- Black Audio Film Collective
- Hannah Black (living)
- BLK Art Group
- Phoebe Boswell (born 1982)
- Frank Bowling (born 1934)
- Sonia Boyce (born 1962)
- Winston Branch (born 1947)
- Vanley Burke (born 1951)

== C ==
- Pogus Caesar (born 1953)
- Sokari Douglas Camp (born 1958)
- Eddie Chambers (born 1960)
- Chinwe Chukwuogo-Roy (1952−2012)
- Quilla Constance (born 1980)

== D ==
- Adelaide Damoah (born 1976)
- Paul Dash (born 1946)
- Dels (living)
- Godfried Donkor (born 1964)
- Kimathi Donkor (born 1965)

== E ==
- Uzo Egonu (1931–1996)
- Ben Enwonwu (1917–1994)
- Kodwo Eshun (born 1967)
- Mary Evans (born 1963)

== F ==
- Jadé Fadojutimi (born 1993)
- Rotimi Fani-Kayode (1955–1989)
- Denzil Forrester (born 1956)
- Errol Francis (born 1956)
- Nicola Frimpong (born 1987)

== G ==
- Raimi Gbadamosi (born 1965)
- Goldie (born 1965)
- Joy Gregory (born 1959)

== H ==
- Anthea Hamilton (born 1978)
- Lubaina Himid (born 1954)
- Zita Holbourne (born 1960s)
- Christian Holder (1949–2025)
- Amanda Holiday (born 1964)

== I ==
- Yinka Ilori (born 1987)

== J ==
- Valda Jackson (born c. 1959)
- Emmanuel Taiwo Jegede (born 1943)
- Claudette Johnson (born 1959)
- Rachel Jones (born 1991)
- Tam Joseph (born 1947)
- Isaac Julien (born 1960)

== K ==
- Samson Kambalu (born 1975)
- Rita Keegan (born 1949)
- Fowokan George Kelly (born 1943)

== L ==
- Joy Labinjo (born 1994)
- Errol Lloyd (born 1943)
- Donald Locke (1930–2010)
- Hew Locke (born 1959)
- John Lyons (born 1933)

== M ==
- Taslim Martin (born 1962)
- Michael McMillan (born 1962)
- Althea McNish (1924–2020)
- Steve McQueen (born 1969)
- Kobena Mercer (born 1960)
- Jade Montserrat (born 1981)
- Ronald Moody (1900–1984)

== N ==
- Virginia Nimarkoh (born 1967)
- David Emmanuel Noel (born 1972)
- Pitika Ntuli (born 1942)

== O ==
- Cian Oba-Smith (born 1992)
- Magdalene Odundo (born 1950)
- Chris Ofili (born 1968)
- Kelvin Okafor (born 1985)
- Diriye Osman (born 1983)
- Horace Ové (1939–2023)
- Zak Ové (born 1966)

== P ==
- Eugene Palmer (born 1955)
- Janette Parris (born 1962)
- Rudi Patterson (1933–2013)
- Woodrow Phoenix (living)
- Keith Piper (born 1960)
- Ingrid Pollard (born 1953)

== R ==
- Benji Reid (born 1966)
- Donald Rodney (1961–1998)
- Veronica Ryan (born 1956)

== S ==
- Ibrahim el-Salahi (born 1930)
- Michael Salu (living)
- Yinka Shonibare (born 1962)
- Maud Sulter (1960–2008)

== V ==
- Lina Iris Viktor (born 1987)

== W ==
- Barbara Walker (born 1964)
- Alberta Whittle (born 1980)
- Willard Wigan (born 1957)
- Aubrey Williams (1926–1990)
- Stephen Wiltshire (born 1974)

== Y ==
- Lynette Yiadom-Boakye (born 1977)

== See also ==
- Black British
