= Amanda Holiday =

Sierra Leonean-British artist, filmmaker and poet (born 1964)

- Born: 1964 (age 61–62); Sierra Leone
- Citizenship: United Kingdom
- Education: Jacob Kramer College, Wimbledon School of Art, University of East Anglia
- Occupations: artist, filmmaker and poet

Amanda Bintu Holiday (born 1964) is a Sierra Leonean-British artist, filmmaker and poet.

== Life ==
Amanda Holiday was born in 1964 in Sierra Leone. Aged five, she emigrated to the United Kingdom, and grew up in Wigan. She completed the foundation art course at Jacob Kramer College alongside Clio Barnard and Damien Hirst and went on to study fine art at Wimbledon School of Art graduating in 1987.

Holiday was active in the second wave of the Black British art movement, undertaking large-scale figurative mixed-media drawings. The Hum of History, in charcoal and chalk, was "a cyclic story about hope in the 80s". Her work was exhibited in major 1980s black British art exhibitions including Creation for Liberation, Some of us are Brave, Black Art: Plotting the Course and Black Perspectives.

She directed the short video Employing the Image (1989) as part of the Arts Council Black Arts Video Project featuring the work of contemporary black visual artists Sonia Boyce, Simone Alexander, Zarina Bhimji, Keith Piper and Allan deSouza. Holiday directed shorts including Umbrage funded by Arts Council/C4, Miss Queencake as part of BFI New Directors and Manao Tupapau funded by Arts Council/BBC. Miss Queencake was shown at the Torino Film Festival. It tells the story of a mixed-race teenager, Bira, from the North of England married off to a white boatman. Embarking on her honeymoon, Bira escapes the racism of her everyday life by constructing a fantasy world in which she is a princess. Manao Tupapau looked at the experience of Merahi metua no Tehamana modelling for Paul Gauguin in Tahiti.

From 2001 to 2010 Holiday lived in Cape Town, writing and directing several educational television series.

In 2019, Holiday completed the Creative Writing (Poetry) MA course at the University of East Anglia. In 2020, she was shortlisted for the Brunel International African Poetry Prize and in the same year founded Black Sunflowers Poetry Press, the UK's first crowdfunded poetry press. As of 2021, she is Techne funded PhD candidate at the School of Humanities and Social Science at Brighton University.

== Work ==
=== Exhibitions ===
- Creation for Liberation 3rd Open Exhibition: Contemporary Art by Black Artists. GLC Brixton Recreation Centre, London. 1985. With Clement Bedeau, Chila Burman, Pogus Caesar, Margaret Cooper, Eddie Chambers, Stella Dadzie, Atvarjeet Dhanjal, Horace Opio Donovan, Tapfuma Moses Gutsa, Amarjeet Gujral, Lubaina Himid, Anthony Jadunath, George Kelly, Errol Lloyd, Kenneth McCalla, Pitika Ntuli, Mowbray Odonkor, Eugene Palmer, Maud Sulter, Aubrey Williams, and Shakka Dedi.
- Some of Us are Brave, Black Art Gallery, 1986. With Simone Alexander, Sonia Boyce, Lubaina Himid, Mowbray Odonkor, Marlene Smith and Maud Sulter. ^{[10]}
- Creation for Liberation 4th Open Exhibition: Contemporary Art by Black Artists. Brixton Village, London. 1987. With Achar Kumar Burman, Margaret Cooper, Zil Hoque, and Fitzroy Sang.
- Umbrage, Bedford Hill Gallery, solo show 1987
- Black Perspectives, South London Gallery 1987. With Simone Alexander, Mowbray Odonkor et al ^{[12]}
- The Room Next to Mine. Bedford Hill Gallery, 1988. With Simone Alexander.
- The Image Employed: The Use of Narrative in Black Art. Cornerhouse, Manchester. With Simone Alexander, Zarina Bhimji, Sutapa Biswas, Sonia Boyce, Chila Kumari Burman, Eddie Chambers, Jennifer Comrie, Claudette Johnson, Tam Joseph, Mathison/George, Mowbray Odonkor, Keith Piper, Donald Rodney, Marlene Smith, and Allan de Souza.
- Black Art: Plotting the Course. Oldham Art Gallery, Oldham (and toured to Camden Arts Centre, London) 1988. With Said Adrus, Upjohn Aghaji, Georgia Belfont, Donald Brown, Val Brown, Nina Edge, Isaiah Ferguson, Carol Hughes, Wendy Jarrett, Tam Joseph, Godfrey Lee, Errol Lloyd, John Lyons, Julia Millette, Mowbray Odonkor, Paul Ogbonno, Eugene Palmer, Tony Phillips, Ray Povey, Jaswinder Singh Purewal, Alistair Raphael, Lesley Sanderson, Mark Sealy, Gurminder Sikand, Shanti Thomas, and Jan Wandja.
- Incantations: Reclaiming Imagination. The Black Art Gallery, London. With Georgina Grant and Mowbray Odonkor.
- Black Art: New Directions. Stoke-on-Trent City Museum & Art Gallery, 1989. With Chila Kumari Burman, Anthony Daley, Sharon Lutchman, Amrit Row, Yinka Shonibare, Dionne Sparks, and Maud Sulter.
- Progress Reports, Art in an era of Diversity, INIVA 2010. With Manick Govinda, Karen Alexander, Zarina Bhimji, Kara Walker, Julie Dash and Harold Offeh et al.^{[13]}

=== Films ===
- Babel, 1988.
- Employing the Image - Making Space for Ourselves, 1989.
- Umbrage, 1990.
- Miss Queencake, 1991.
- Manao Tupapau (The Spirit of the Dead Watches), 1993. watch on YouTube
- The Curtain, 1992

=== Writing ===
- The Art Poems. Akashic Books, 2018. Chapbook. Included in Kwame Dawes; Chris Abani, eds. (2018). New-Generation African Poets Chapbook Box Set: Tano. New York: Akashic Books.
- "A Posthumous Conversation about Black Art" (PDF). The Critical Fish (1): 26–30. May 2019.
