= Transforming the Crown =

1997–1998 art exhibition

Transforming the Crown was an exhibition of artwork created by African, Asian and Caribbean Artists in Britain during the years from 1966 to 1996, which was shown across three venues in New York City, United States, between October 1997 and March 1998. The venues hosting the exhibition were The Studio Museum in Harlem (October 14, 1997–March 15 1998), The Bronx Museum of the Arts (October 15, 1997–March 15, 1998), and The Caribbean Cultural Center, New York (October 16, 1997–March 15, 1998), where a component of the show titled Picturing England: The Photographic Narratives of Vanley Burke was shown. The exhibition was curated by Mora Beauchamp-Byrd, who at the time was Curator and Director of Special Projects at the Caribbean Cultural Center.

== Reception ==
In Art Monthly, Eddie Chambers commented on the fact that the spaces chosen for the exhibition were "widely perceived as primarily existing to service black and other non-white communities" and also questioned the exhibition's scope and focus, concluding: "Much of the press response to 'Transforming the Crown' is polite and enthusiastic. For example, an end-of-January listing of the exhibition in the New York Times described it as being 'packed with terrific artists ... projecting a unified force field of energy as palpable as it is hard to define'. It must be left to others – not least the exhibition reviewers themselves – to fathom how much of this praise is genuine art appreciation and how much is derived from a sense of liberal surprise that not everyone in Britain is white and speaks with a plummy accent."

Niru Ratnam wrote in Third Text: "'Transforming the Crown' was an ambitious affair; 148 works by 58 artists suggested some sort of grand vision. Unfortunately, despite the number of artists involved, the absences were more notable than some of the presences. ...Contrary to its title, the exhibition had a disproportionate amount of art from recent years, with the '70s suffering most from under-representation. But anyhow, there were some good moments.

== Exhibition publication ==
An accompanying illustrated catalog, Transforming the Crown: African, Asian and Caribbean Artists in Britain 1966 – 1996, was produced in 1997 by The Caribbean Cultural Center, New York. Essays were contributed by M. Franklin Sirmans (editor), Mora J. Beauchamp-Byrd, Eddie Chambers, Okwui Enwezor, Kobena Mercer, Gilane Tawadros, Anne Walmsley, Deborah Willis, and Judith Wilson.

The publication featured the exhibited artists, as well as including Donald Rodney, although his work was not in the show.

== Artists ==
- Faisal Abdu'Allah
- Said Adrus
- Ajamu
- Henrietta Atooma Alele
- Hassan Aliyu
- Marcia Bennett
- Zarina Bhimji
- Sutapa Biswas
- Sylbert Bolton
- Sonia Boyce
- Winston Branch
- Vanley Burke
- Chila Kumari Burman
- Sokari Douglas Camp
- Anthony Daley
- Allan deSouza
- Godfried Donkor
- Nina Edge
- Uzo Egonu
- Rotimi Fani-Kayode
- Denzil Forrester
- Armet Francis
- Joy Gregory
- Sunil Gupta
- Lubaina Himid
- Bhajan Hunjan
- Meena Jafarey
- Gavin Jantjes
- Emmanuel Taiwo Jegede
- Claudette Johnson
- Mumtaz Karimjee
- Rita Keegan
- Fowokan George Kelly
- Roshini Kempadoo
- Juginder Lamba
- Errol Lloyd
- Anita Jeni McKenzie
- Althea McNish
- David Medalla
- Shaheen Merali
- Bill Ming
- Ronald Moody
- Olu Oguibe
- Eugene Pamer
- Tony Phillips
- Keith Piper
- Ingrid Pollard
- Franklyn Rodgers
- Donald Rodney
- Veronica Ryan
- Lesley Sanderson
- Folake Shoga
- Yinka Shonibare
- Gurminder Sikand
- Maud Sulter
- Danijah Tafari
- Geraldine Walsh
- Aubrey Williams
