= Virginia Nimarkoh =

British artist and activist

Virginia Agyeiwah Nimarkoh (born January 1967) is a British artist and activist, based in London. Nimarkoh was born in London, and studied at Goldsmiths College London from 1986 to 1989, graduating with a PhD in Fine Art (Theory & Practice). Her practice combines mostly photographic and curatorial projects. She also works in community development and environmental regeneration initiatives across London. She currently works mainly with food, running a raw food business and food insecurity social enterprise in London.

== Work ==
Nimarkoh is interested in how we deal with identity in relation to personal history; the methods by which we record our lives, how we choose to edit our past, and in the disparity that often exists between reality, memory and the images we own of this past.

A series of Nimarkoh's photo-installations was selected in 1990 by Henry Bond and Sarah Lucas for inclusion in their warehouse exhibition East Country Yard Show.

In 1993, Nimarkoh produced The Phone Box: Art in Telephone Boxes (London: Virginia Nimarkoh/Bookworks, 1993), an edition of 300 with original artists works as well as Postcard, an artist's book consisting of 144 colour postcards forming one composite image, (London: BookWorks, 1993).

Her photographic series Urban Utopias (2005–ongoing) is concerned with spaces in South East London, depicting allotments, city farms and parks.

In 2008, Nimarkoh curated the research project Edge of a Dream: Utopia, Landscape & Contemporary Photography, which explored utopian depictions of landscape within recent art photography in the context of global capitalism, funded by the Arts & Humanities Research Council, with support from Camberwell College of Arts, Goldsmiths University of London and Hand Eye Projects. The international selection of artists included Simryn Gill (AUS), Mandy Lee Jandrell (SA/UK), Virginia Nimarkoh (UK) and David Spero (UK). The research project commissioned new writing by Anthony Iles (Mute magazine), Kate Soper (London Metropolitan University), John Wood (Goldsmiths), and a preface by Paul Halliday (Goldsmiths). The book Edge of a Dream was published in 2011 by Affram Books.

In 2019, Nimarkoh collaborated with Fan Sissoko on the short film We The People, in partnership with the Advocacy Academy, the UK's first youth activist campus, based in Brixton. The original soundtrack is by Dubmorphology. The project was commissioned by Museum of London.

== Exhibitions ==
=== Solo exhibitions ===
- 2011: Urban Utopias, Kunstraum Lakeside, Germany.

=== Group exhibitions ===
- 1991: Four x 4, Installations by Sixteen Artists in Four Gallery Spaces. Harris Museum and Art Gallery, Preston, with Shaheen Merali, Houria Niati, Sher Rajah, Lesley Sanderson; Wolverhampton Art Gallery, Wolverhampton with Osi Audu, Val Brown, Stephen Forde, Rita Keegan; The City Gallery, Leicester with Medina Hammad, Richard Hylton, Tony Phillips, Folake Shoga; Arnolfini, Bristol with Permindaur Kaur, Alistair Raphael, and Vincent Stokes, Curated by Eddie Chambers
- 1994: Mise en Scene Institute of Contemporary Arts, London.
- 1995: Care and Control, Hackney Hospital, London, with Donald Rodney
- 1995: Exotic Excursions, Iniva, London with Michael Curran, Clair Joy, Tatsuo Majima, Fernando Palma Rodriguez, Kate Smith and Clare Cumberlidge.

== Publications ==
- David Bate, Francois Leperlier, Mise-en-Scene: Claude Cahun, Tacita Dean, Virginia Nimarkoh, ICA London, 1994.
- The Holy Bible: Old Testament, an artist book by David Hammons, co-produced by Virginia Nimarkoh and Richard Hylton, 2002.
- Edge of a Dream: Utopia, Landscape + Contemporary Photography, Simryn Gill, Mandylee Jandrell, David Spero, Paul Halliday, Virginia Nimarkoh, John Wood, Anthony Iles and Kate Soper, Affram Books 2010.
- Katharine Meynell, Mutual Dependencies, Artwords Press London, 2011.
