= Chila Kumari Burman =

British artist

Chila Kumari Singh Burman MBE
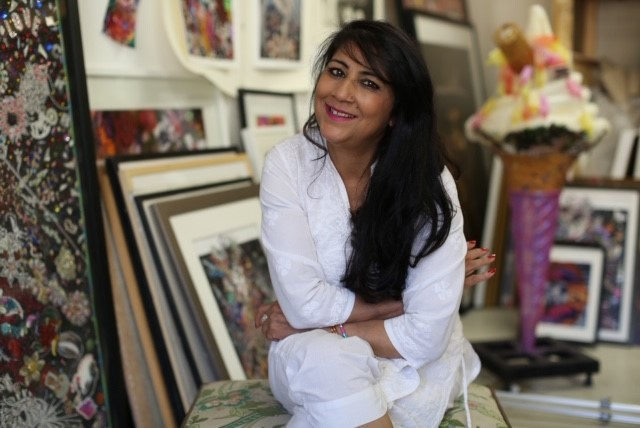
- Born: Bootle, England
- Education: Southport College of Art; Leeds Polytechnic; University College London
- Occupation: Artist
- Website: chila-kumari-burman.co.uk

Chila Kumari Singh Burman MBE is a British artist, celebrated for her radical feminist practice, which examines representation, gender and cultural identity. She works across a wide range of mediums including printmaking, drawing, painting, installation and film.

A significant figure in the Black British Art movement of the 1980s, Burman remains one of the first British Asian female artists to have a monograph written about her work; Lynda Nead's Chila Kumari Burman: Beyond Two Cultures (1995).

In 2018, she received an honorary doctorate from University of the Arts London for her impact and legacy as an international artist. In 2020, she was invited into the Art Workers' Guild as a Brother and in 2022, Burman was appointed a Member of the Order of the British Empire (MBE) in the Queen's Birthday Honours for services to visual art.

== Early life ==
Born in Bootle, near Liverpool, England, to Indian Hindu Punjabi parents, Burman attended the Southport College of Art, Leeds Polytechnic and the Slade School of Fine Art, UCL where she graduated in 1982.

== Career ==
For more than four decades, Burman's practice has been at the intersection of feminism, race and representation. A key figure in the British Black Arts movement in the 1980s, Burman has remained rooted in her understanding of the diverse nature of culture. Continually seeking to break stereotypes and emancipate the image of women, she often uses self-portraiture as a tool of empowerment and self-determination.

In the 1980s, her work was shown in a number of seminal group shows including Four Indian Women Artists (UK Artists Gallery, 1982); Black Women Time Now (Battersea Arts Centre, London, 1983); The Thin Black Line (ICA, London, 1985); Black Art: New Directions (Stoke-on-Trent Museum and Art Gallery, 1989) and the feminist exhibition Along the Lines of Resistance (Rochdale Art Gallery and touring, 1989).

In the 1990s and 2000s, Burman's works more explicitly explored her family history, specifically her father's work as an ice-cream van man in Bootle (in her exhibitions Candy-Pop & Juicy Lucy, Stephen Lawrence Gallery, University of Greenwich, London, 2006; Ice Cream and Magic, The Pump House, People's History Museum, Manchester, 1997). In the 1990s, her work was featured in the Fifth Havana Biennale (1994); Transforming the Crown (Studio Museum in Harlem, and Bronx Museum, New York, 1997); Genders and Nations (with Shirin Neshat; Herbert F. Johnson Museum of Art, Cornell University, New York State, 1998). Her retrospective touring show, 28 Positions in 34 Years, went to Camerawork, London; Liverpool Bluecoat Gallery, Liverpool; Oldham Art Gallery; Huddersfield Art Gallery; Street Level Gallery, Glasgow; Cardiff Technical College, Cardiff; Watermans Arts Centre, London. From the 2000s, her works were frequently shown internationally with notable group shows including South Asian Women of the Diaspora (Queens Library, New York, 2001) and Text and Subtext (Earl-Lu Gallery, Lasalle-SIA University, Singapore, 2000) toured to Ivan Dougherty Gallery, Sydney, Australia, in 2000 and Ostiasiataka Museet (Museum of Far Eastern Antiquities) Stockholm, in 2001, Sternersenmuseet, Oslo, Norway, and Taipei Fine Arts Museum, Taiwan; X-ray Art Centre (Rui Wen Hua Yi Shu Zhong Xin), Beijing, China, in 2002 (exhibition catalogue).

In 2018, Burman's survey show Tales of Valiant Queens was displayed at Middlesbrough Institute of Modern Art. Bringing together works made between the 1970s up to 2018. The show focused on themes of female empowerment, social and political activism, folk traditions and colonial legacy. The show included many iconic pieces alongside newer works. The show was reviewed as one that showed "how the race, gender and class barriers the Burman family encountered formed the political dynamism of her work".

In 2020, Burman was selected as the fourth artist to complete the Tate Britain Winter Commission. The resulting installation Remembering A Brave New World, addressed the colonial history of Tate Britain and its Eurocentric position. Adorning the gallery façade with references to Indian mythology, popular culture, female empowerment, political activism and colonial legacy. It tried to show a need for better informed conversations, and more effective strategies for tackling racism in the art world and wider society. Burman has since gone on to complete light installation projects Do you see words in rainbows for Covent Garden's historic market stall building, Liverpool Love of My Life for the Liverpool Town Hall, and Blackpool Light of My Life for Blackpool's Grade II listed Grundy Art Gallery. Burman has also featured in Sky Arts documentary special Statues Redressed and BBC2 documentary Art That Made Us, and has completed a number of commission pieces for brands including Netflix's White Tiger campaign and Byredo's new fragrance Mumbai Noise.

In 2023, Burman was part of the jury for the John Moores Painting Prize, along with Alexis Harding, The White Pube, Marlene Smith and Yu Hong.

== Writing and publications ==
Alongside visual arts, Burman has written extensively on feminism, race, art and activism. In 1987, she wrote "There have always been Great Blackwomen Artists", exploring the situation of black women artists in relation to Linda Nochlin's 1971 essay "Why have there been no Great Women Artists?" (first published in Women Artists Slide Library Journal no. 15 (February 1987), and then in Hilary Robinson (ed.), Visibly Female (London: Camden Press, 1987); also reproduced in Collective Black Women Writers, Charting the Journey: An Anthology on Black and Third World Writers (London: Sheba Publishers).

Her work appeared on the bookjacket of Meera Syal's two novels on first publication: Anita and Me (Doubleday/Transworld, 1996); Life Isn't All Ha Ha Hee Hee (Doubleday/Transworld, 1999), as well as on the covers of James Proctor (ed.), Writing Black Britain, 1948–1998 (Manchester University Press, 2001); Roger Bromley (ed.), Narratives for a New Belonging: Diasporic Cultural Fictions (Edinburgh University Press, 2000); and Peter Childs and Patrick Williams, An Introduction to Post-Colonial Theory (Prentice Hall, 1998).

Burman's work features in the 2018 exhibition publication No Colour Bar: Black British Art in Action 1960–1990, edited by Beverley Mason and Margaret Busby.

== Selected writings ==
- 2000: "Storm in a D-Cup", Artists Newsletter
- 1999: Artist's statements in Frances Borzello, Women and Self Portraiture (Thames and Hudson)
  - Artist's Statement in "West Coast Line Here and There Between South Asia's", New Writing from Canada and India, nos. 26 and 27
  - "Crossing Cultures", artist's statement in "KHOJ International Workshops", Artists Newsletter Magazine, January
- 1998: "Objects of Désireé", Artists Pages with Lucretia Knapp n.paradoxa: international feminist art journal, Vol. 1, January
  - Artist's statement in Sue Golding, Eight Technologies of Otherness (London: Routledge)
- 1995: "Automatic Rap", in Catherine Ugwu (ed.), Let's Get It On: The Politics of Black Performance (London: ICA, and Seattle: Bay Press), p. 113
  - "Right to Hope", in One World Art (UNESCO)
- 1993: "Enough is Enough", Feminist Art News, Vol. 4, No. 5
- 1992: "Power to the People: Fear of a Black Community", Feminist Art News, Vol. 3, no.9
  - "Ask How I feel/ Automatic Rap/ My New Work", Third Text, No. 19, Summer
- 1991: "Ask How I Feel", Feminist Arts News, Vol. 3, No. 6 (also guest editor for this issue on "Working Class Women Artists")
  - "Power to the people: fear of a black community", Feminist Arts News, vol. 3, no. 9, pp. 14–15
- 1990: "Talking in Tongues", in Maud Sulter (ed.), Passion: Discourses on Black Women's Creativity (Hebden Bridge: Urban Fox Press)
  - "Mash it up", in Rozsika Parker and Griselda Pollock, Framing Feminism: Art and the Women's Movement, 1970-1985 (London: Pandora Press)

== Selected reviews, articles, broadcasts, publications ==
- 2022: Bernardine Evaristo, "They are totally smashing it!’ Bernardine Evaristo on the artistic triumph of older Black women," The Guardian, 28 April 2022
- 2020: Louisa Buck, "Blinged-up but razor-sharp", interview, The Art Newspaper, 16 November 2020
- 2020: Alice Corriea, "Picturing Resistance and Resilience: South Asian Identities in the Work of Chila Kumari Burman", Visual Culture in Britain, 21 February 2020
- 2012: Rina Arya, "Chila Kumari Burman: Shakti, Sexuality and Bindis," KT press, London, 2012
- 2012: Kahu Kochar, "Challenging stereotypes", interview with C. K. Burman, Platform magazine review, 27 February 2012
  - Leslie Goodwin, "Brilliant portrait of artist", Leicester Mercury, 8 March 2012, p. 11
  - Drawing paper number #6 (Tate Liverpool) in conjunction with the Liverpool biennale 2012, co-curated by Mike Carney, Jon Barraclough, Gavin Delahunty
- 2011: Cheah Ui–Hoon, "Piecing together the Fragments", Singapore Business Times, 29 August 2011
  - Ryan, "In the Mix", Indian Express, 20 March 2011
  - "Exotic Edge", Blindspot exhibition, Home (Hong Kong), December, p. 47
  - Review of Blindspot exhibition, Ming Pao Weekly (Hong Kong), 3 December 2011, p. 119
- 2010: Richard Appignanesi (ed.), Beyond Cultural Diversity: The Case for Creativity (Third Text)
  - Guardian online, Feminist postcard art auction at the Aubin Gallery, London, October
  - Coline Milliard, "A Missing History: The Other Story revisited", Art Monthly, no. 339, pp. 30–31
- 2009: Katy Deepwell, "Feminist art practice rewind, remix, and pump up volume", Axis: Curated Collections, 29 July 2009
  - "Interview with Chila Burman", Space Studios online, 1 November
- 2007: "Close-up: Interview with Imogen Fox", The Guardian, 9 June 2007
  - Barbara Chandler, "Indian summer in the city", Evening Standard (London), 8 August 2007, p. 1
  - Hannah Pool, "Change your mind: When it comes to creativity there really are no limits: The artist: Chila Kumari Burman", The Guardian (London), 2 June 2007, p. 7
  - BBC Radio 4 Midweek, interview with Libby Purvis
  - BBC Asian Network, radio Interview with Nikki Bedi
- 2006: Review of Candy Pop and Juicy Lucy in Time Out
  - Stephen Pettifor, "The layering of self", Asian Art News, vol. 16, no. 6, pp. 78–81
  - Richard Noyce, Printmaking at the Edge (London: A and C Black)
- 2005: BBC2, Desi DNA TV Arts programme
- 2004: Amit Roy, "Review", Calcutta and Bombay Times
  - "Mind, Body, Spirit", British Medical Journal
  - Amit Roy, "Ice-Cream Van Girl Cometh", Eastern Eye and Daily Telegraph
  - Ali Hussein, "Dazzling", Times of India (Britain)
  - Review of Points of View solo exhibition at Hastings Museum and Art Gallery, A-N Magazine (January 2004)
  - Derwent May, "Brunei Gallery — a medicine show perks up", The Times (London), 2 November 2004, p. 16.
  - Rasheed Araeen, "The success and the failure of Black Art", Third Text (2004)
- 2003: "Interview with Nancy Hynes", Atlántica 35
  - Yasmin Alibhai-Brown, "Our multicultural society is transforming Britart", The Independent (London), 17 March 2003, p. 15
  - BBC Radio 4, New BRIT Series, interview with Yasmin Alibhai-Brown
- 2002: John Cornall, "Fashioning lessons out of art; Stitched Up", Leamington Art Gallery & Museum, Royal Pump Rooms, Birmingham Post, 30 January 2002, p. 14
- 2001: Stuart Hall and Mark Sealy, Different, Phaidon
  - LXE 9 – "Art and Light on Homerton High Street"
  - Massimo Tommaso Mazza, 1st Valencia Biennial, Video Showroom,
  - Christina Kasrlstam, "Text + Subtext", Stockholm Times, 20–25 October
  - Franklin Sirmins, New York Time Out, 7 February
  - "Flirt", "Storm in a D-Cup", Admit 1 Gallery, Art in Review, by Holland Cotter, The New York Times, 9 February
  - S. Valdez, "Chila Kumari Burman at Admit One", Art in America, vol. 89, no. 10, pp. 169–169
  - Victoria Lu, "Text + Subtext", Artists Magazine, Singapore
  - Meena Alexander, "Post-Colonial Theatre of Sense: The Art of Chila Kumari Burman", n.paradoxa: international feminist art journal, issue 14 February, pp. 4–13
- 2000: Wish You Were Here: Scottish Multicultural Anthology, Scottish National Portrait Gallery, Pocket Books Publication
  - Ann Donald, "A fresh look at the writer". Review of Wish You were Here, The Herald (Glasgow), 18 September 2000, p. 12
  - En Young Ahn, "Text + Subtext Exhibition, Lasalle-Sia", Art Monthly Australia
  - Rachel Jacques, "Hello Girls", Wasafiri, vol. 16, no. 32, Autumn 2000, pp. 25–26
  - Rachel Jacques, "The Wonder of the Bra", Singapore Arts Magazine
  - BBC Radio 4, Woman's Hour, interview with Jenni Murray (13 September)
- 1999: Martin Longley, "Sisters doing it for a chosen few: Sister India", Wolverhampton Wulfrun Hall, Birmingham Post, 19 October 1999, p. 15
  - Eastern Mix (Carlton TV / Central TV programme), includes an interview with Chila Kumari Burman
- 1998: Lavini Melwani, review of Transforming the Crown exhibition, American Revisions (New York)
  - Deirdre Hanna, "Salvation Artists Escape Tourist Trap", XTARI, No. 357 (Toronto)
  - Namiti Bhandare, "Bohemian Rhapsody", New Delhi Times (New Delhi), No. 24
  - Anshul Avijit, "Fun and Vision", Hindustan Times (New Delhi), 28 November
  - Kum Kum Dasgupta, "Khoj Artists of the World Unite", Asian Age (New Delhi)
  - Alka Pande, "Artlinei", The Indian Express, 21 November, Chundigarh
  - Geeta Sharma, "The Search Within", The Telegraph Calcutta Weekend, 28 November, Calcutta
  - Nilanjana S. Roy, "The Miracle at Muldinager", New Delhi Times, 21 November
  - Frances Borzello (ed), Seeing Ourselves: Women's Self-portraits, Thames & Hudson
- 1997: John Holt, "Chila Kumari Burman: A Martial Artist Beyond Two Cultures", Third Text no. 41, Winter 1997/98, pp. 96–8
  - Holland Cotter review of Out of India at the Queens Museum, The New York Times, 26 December
  - Sonali Fernando, "Indian Women Photographers", Photographers International, No. 35, SE Asia
  - Balraj Khanna, "Review of Indian Women Photographers", Artists and Illustrators (1997)
  - Interview in TV programme by Stuart Hall on Black British Photography (Channel 4)
- 1996: Marsha Meskimmon, The Art of Reflection: Women Artists’ Self- Portraiture in the Twentieth Century, Scarlet Press, London & New York
  - Iain Gale/Rupert Goodwins/Sarah Hemming Julian May/Steven Poole/Ian Shuttleworth, "Review of Ice-Cream and Magic II", The Independent (London), 13 January 1996: 2, 13 January 1995: 2.
- 1995: Tanya Guha, '"Camerawork – Chila Kumari Burman", Time Out, 27 September 1995
  - Channel 4, I'M BRITISH BUT by Pratibha Parmar, TV programme interview
- 1994: Review of Portrait of My Mother, The Times, 15 October, London
  - "Chila Kumari Burman", Versus (1994)
- 1993: Shirini Sabratham, review of Transition of Riches, The Observer (London), 20 December
  - Allan de Souza, review of Confrontations exhibition Creative Camera, February
  - Jacques Rangasamy, review of Confrontations exhibition, Third Text, No 22
  - Joseph Williams, "Colours Enter the Picture", The Times, 25 August 1993
  - Review of Transition of Riches, Asian Times, 27 November;
  - Review of Transition of Riches, The Birmingham Post, 20 November
  - Robert Clark, "South Asian Visual Arts Festival Birmingham", The Guardian (Manchester), 9 October 1993
  - Keith Piper, "Separate spaces", Variant (1993)
- 1992: Lynda Nead, The Female Nude: Art, Obscenity & Sexuality, London: Routledge
  - Tim Hilton, review of Radical Hair Gallery exhibition, The Guardian, 25 July
  - "Identikit, Profile on Chila Burman", Bazaar Magazine (London), no. 15
  - Janice Cheddie, "Body Rites: the Self-Portraits of Chila Burman", Women's Art Magazine (London), no. 49
- 1990: Hiroko Hagiwara, Black Women Artists Speak Out (PQ Books, Osaka, Japan, Japanese text)
  - Nina Perez, Review of Horizon Gallery exhibition, Women's Art Magazine, no. 36, and in Feminist Art News London, vol. 3, no. 6
- 1989: Hiroko Hagiwara, Feminist Art News, Vol. 3, No. 1 (London)
- 1989: Four Indian Women Artists (BBC Pebble Mill, Birmingham), TV programme about Chila Kumari Burman
- 1988: Andrew Hope, Race Today, Vol. 18, No 2, London
  - Chambers, E., & J. Lamba, The Artpack: a history of black artists in Britain, Haringey Arts Council
  - Owusu, Kwesi, Nadir Tharani, Pratibha Parmar, Jide Odusina, Keith Piper, Donald Rodney, David A. Bailey, Ruhi Hamid, Armet Francis, Pitika Ntuli (eds), Storms of the Heart: An Anthology of Black Arts & Culture (Camden Press, 1988)
- 1985: Waldemar Januszczak, "Anger At Hand", The Guardian (London), 29 June
  - Errol Lloyd, review of The Thin Black Line, ArtRage (London), November
- 1982: C. Collier, "Four Indian Women Artists: Bhajan Hunjan, Naomi Iny, Chila Kuman Burman, Vinodini Ebdon (Indian Artists UK Gallery, London: Exhibition Review)", Arts Review (UK), Vol. 34, No. 2 (15 January 1982), p. 18

== Collections ==
Burman's work is collected worldwide, notably by Seattle Art Museum, National Portrait Gallery, Tate Gallery, Victoria and Albert Museum, Wellcome Trust, Science Museum, Arts Council Collection and the British Council in London; Museum and Art Gallery in Birmingham; Sir Richard Branson; Cartwright Hall in Bradford; Devi Foundation in New Delhi; Linda Goodman in Johannesburg; New Walk Museum and Art Gallery in Leicester; New Art Gallery in Walsall; Scottish National Portrait Gallery in Edinburgh.

== Honours and recognition ==
In 2012, she was artist-in-residence at ART CHENNAI and produced the exhibition pREpellers, curated by Kavita Balakrishnan for Art Chennai, Art and Soul gallery. In 2011–12, Burman's residency at the Poplar HARCA centre, London, concluded with a major solo exhibition in this local community centre. Her residency from February 2009 to March 2010 at the University of East London was the result of a Leverhulme Award. For three years, January 2006 to December 2009, she was artist-in-residence at Villiers High School, Southall, London.

Since January 2004, Burman has been a Trustee at Rich Mix, London (and was Vice-Chair, 2008–2010). In 1986, she took part in producing The Roundhouse Mural Project, Camden, London, and in 1985 produced The Southall Black Resistance Mural, in collaboration with Keith Piper.

Burman was appointed Member of the Order of the British Empire (MBE) in the 2022 Birthday Honours for services to visual art, particularly during the COVID-19 pandemic.

Burman is named on the BBC's 2023 list of 100 Women, which features 100 inspiring and influential women from around the world.

== Exhibitions ==
Selected solo exhibitions and commissions:

- 2022: Neon Drama and Pearl Drops, Mansard Gallery, Heal's, Tottenham Court Road
- 2021: Blackpool light of my life, Grundy Gallery, Blackpool
- 2021: Do you see words in rainbows, Covent Garden West Piazza (Commission)
- 2020: White Tiger Promo Car, Netflix (Commission)
- 2020: Remembering a brave new world, Tate Britain, London
- 2018: Tales of Valliant Queens, Middlesbrough Museum of Modern Arts
- 2017: Illuminating India, Science Museum
- 2017: Dada And The Punjabi Princess, Attenborough Centre, Leicester
- 2017: Portrait in Sugar, MAK Gallery, London
- 2017: Beyond Pop, Wolverhampton Art Gallery, Wolverhampton
- 2016: Absolute!, Grace Belgravia, London
- 2015: MAJAJINI, RichMix, London
- 2015: My Rangila Merry-go-round, Attenborough Arts Centre, Leicester
- 2014: THIS IS NOT ME, Cookhouse Gallery, London
- 2013: GENDER MATTERS, Brunei Gallery, SOAS, London
- 2011: Fragments of My Imagination, Paradox Gallery, Singapore, toured to Blindspot Gallery, Hong Kong (exhibition catalogue)
- 2010: Usurp Art Gallery & Studios: Chila Burman’s Royal Academy Summer Exhibition – the first retrospective of Chila Burman, celebrating over 20 years of experimental and provocative art by one of the leading figures among UK Black and Asian artists
- 2006: CANDY-POP & JUICY LUCY, Stephen Lawrence Gallery, University of Greenwich, London, UK (Iniva education project) (exhibition catalogue)
- 2005–07: Damascus and Aleppo, British Council touring exhibition
- 2005: Chila Kumari Burman, 1995–present, Waterside Arts Centre, Manchester, UK
- 2004: Material Serendipity, Plymouth Arts Centre (exhibition catalogue, Lynn Nead), toured to Cecil Higgins Gallery + Museum, Bedford, Nottingham: New Art Exchange (Apna Arts)
- 2003: Points of View, Hastings Museum & Art Gallery, Hastings, UK
- 2003: Enchanting the Icon, Sakshi Gallery. (exhibition catalogue, Marta Jakimowi)
- 2002: Visual Autobiographies, Rich Mix, London (exhibition catalogue, Leverhulme artist-in-residence)
- 1999: Hello Girls!, Andrew Mummery Gallery, London, UK; Northbrook College of Technology; Bretton Hall, Leeds University, UK; Rochester Art Gallery, Rochester, UK
- 1999: 28 Positions in 34 Years, Victoria and Albert Museum, London, UK
- 1998: Genders and Nations (with Shirin Neshat), Herbert F. Johnson Museum of Art, Cornell University, New York State (exhibition catalogue, Katy Deepwell)
- 1997: Ice Cream and Magic, The Pump House, People's History Museum, Manchester, UK
- 1996: Between the Visible and Invisible, National College of the Arts, Lahore, Pakistan
- 1995: 28 Positions in 34 Years (retrospective touring show), Camerawork, London, UK; Liverpool Bluecoat Gallery, Liverpool, UK; Oldham Art Gallery, Oldham, UK; Huddersfield Art Gallery, Huddersfield, UK; Street Level Gallery, Glasgow, UK; Cardiff Technical College, Cardiff, UK; Watermans Arts Centre, London, UK

Group exhibitions:

- 2022: Embodied Change, Seattle Art Museum
- 2022: Best of British, Maddox Gallery, London
- 2022: Hidden in Plain Site, Stephen Lawrence Gallery, London
- 2021: Hawala, Paradise Row Gallery, London
- 2021: 60 Years of 60 Artists, Tate Britain, London
- 2018: The Past is Now and The British Empire, Birmingham City Museum and Art Gallery,
- 2017: The Place is Here, South London Art Gallery, London
- 2015–16: No Colour Bar: Black British Art in Action 1960–1990, Guildhall Art Gallery, London, UK
- 2010: Seeing In Colour, British Council Touring Show, Bottega-Gallery, Kyiv, Ukraine; Centre for Urban History, Lviv, Ukraine; Academy of Arts, Tbilisi, Georgia; Academy of Fine Arts, Baku, Azerbaijan (exhibition catalogue)
- 2010: ORIENTATIONS trajectories in Indian Art, Foundation DE11 Lijnen, Oudenburg, Belgium (exhibition catalogue)
- 2010: NINE: Her magic square, The Viewing Room Gallery, Mumbai
- 2009: British Subjects, Neuberger Museum of Art, New York, USA
- 2007: Candy Culture/Confectionaries and Conurbations, 100 Tonson Gallery, Bangkok
- 2007: BECKS FUTURES, Manchester, UK
- 2006: Bollywood, Scunthorpe Art Gallery, UK
- 2005: Angels in the Studio. Slade Women Artists, Cecil Higgins Gallery, London, UK
- 2003:Women and Representation, Sakshi Gallery, Bangalore, India
- 2003: History Revision, Plymouth Arts Centre, Plymouth, UK
- 2002: Art of Nations, Visual Arts Centre, North Lincolnshire, UK
- 2002: A Thousand Ways of Being: Memory and Presence in the Arts of Diaspora, October Gallery, London, UK
- 2001: First Valencia Biennial, Valencia, Spain
- 2001: South Asian Women of the Diaspora, Queens Library, New York, USA
- 2000: Text and Subtext, Earl-Lu Gallery, Lasalle-SIA University, Singapore; toured to Ivan Dougherty Gallery, Sydney, Australia, in 2000; Ostiasiataka Museet (Museum of Far Eastern Antiquities) Stockholm, Sweden in 2001; Sternersenmuseet, Oslo, Norway; Taipei Fine Arts Museum, Taiwan; and X-ray Art Centre (Rui Wen Hua Yi Shu Zhong Xin), Beijing, China in 2002. (exhibition catalogue)
- 2000: A Grand Design, Victoria and Albert Museum, London, UK
- 1999/2000: Sister India exhibition, club night of Asian performers and artists, touring the UK
- 1999: Crown Jewels, Berlin, Germany; NGBK; Hamburg, Kampnagel, Germany (exhibition catalogue)
- 1999: 000 Zero Zero Zero, Whitechapel Art Gallery, London, UK
- 1998: Out of India, Queens Museum, New York, USA
- 1998: Art in Freedom, Museum Boijmans Van Beuningen, Rotterdam, The Netherlands
- 1998: Revelations and Performance, Centre for Contemporary Arts, Glasgow, UK
- 1998: Tourists in our own Lands, Gallery 44, Toronto, Canada (exhibition catalogue)
- 1998: You and Me, Walsall Museum and Art Gallery, Walsall, UK
- 1998: North Current, Halland Museum of Cultural History, Sweden and Gedok-Haus, Lubeck, Germany
- 1997: Transforming the Crown, Studio Museum, Harlem and Bronx Museum, New York, USA
- 1997: South Asian Artists, Transcultural Gallery, Cartwright Hall, Bradford, UK
- 1996: Portrait of our Mothers, French Institute, London, UK, touring to Paris and Edinburgh (exhibition catalogue)
- 1996: Uncommon Thread, Civic Theatre, Johannesburg, South Africa
- 1995: Under Different Skies, Oksenhallen, Copenhagen, Denmark
- 1995: Photo-Genetic, Review the Lens of History, Street Level Gallery, Glasgow, UK
- 1995: Cominex Camera, Withzenhaufen Gallery, Amsterdam, the Netherlands
- 1995: Digital Equinox Custard Factory, Birmingham, UK
- 1994: With Your Own Face On It, Plymouth Arts Centre, Nottingham Museum and Art Gallery, Watermans Art Centre, London, UK (exhibition catalogue)
- 1994: Fifth Havana Biennale, Havana, Cuba
- 1994: Femme Noir 21st Century, British Council, Manchester, UK
- 1994: My Grandmother, My Mother, Myself, Southampton City Art Gallery and Sandton Art Gallery, Johannesburg, South Africa (exhibition catalogue)
- 1993: Transition of Riches, Southampton City Art Gallery, Birmingham City Art Gallery and touring (exhibition catalogue)
- 1992: Fine Material for a Dream, Harris Museum and Art Gallery, Preston, UK, and touring (exhibition catalogue)
- 1992: Confrontations, Walsall Museum and Art Gallery, Walsall, UK (exhibition catalogue)
- 1992: Back of Beyond/ Keeping Together, The Pavilion, Leeds, UK (exhibition catalogue)
- 1991: The Circular Dance, Arnolfini, Bristol, UK, and touring (exhibition catalogue)
- 1990: Let the Canvas Come to Life with Dark Faces, Coventry City Art Gallery, UK, and touring
- 1990: Heroes and Heroines, Ikon Gallery, Birmingham, UK
- 1990: Fabled Territories, Leeds City Art Galleries and touring (exhibition catalogue)
- 1989: Black Art: New Directions, Stoke-on-Trent Museum and Art Gallery, UK
- 1989: Along the Lines of Resistance, Rochdale Art Gallery and touring (exhibition catalogue)
- 1989: Animal Liberation: The Centre of the Circle, Rochdale Art Gallery (exhibition catalogue)
- 1988: The Medium and the Message, Five Women Printmakers, Rochdale Art Gallery (exhibition catalogue)
- 1988: Numaish Lalit Kala, Bluecoat Gallery, Liverpool, UK (exhibition catalogue)
- 1987: The Devils Feast, Chelsea School of Art, London, UK
- 1987: The Image Employed, Cornerhouse, Manchester, UK (exhibition catalogue)
- 1985: Artists Against Apartheid, Royal Festival Hall, London, UK
- 1985: The Thin Black Line, ICA, London, UK
- 1983: Indian Artists UK Festival of India, The Barbican, London, UK
- 1983: Black Women Time Now, Battersea Arts Centre, London, UK
- 1983: Creation for Liberation, Brixton Art Gallery, London, UK
