= Chuhan (surname) =

Chuhan is a surname. Notable people with the surname include:

- Jagjit Chuhan (born 1955), Indian-British artist, curator and lecturer
- Wang Chuhan (born 1992), Chinese tennis player
