= Gabriel Gbadamosi =

British poet, playwright and novelist (born 1961)

Gabriel Gbadamosi FRSL
- Born: 1961 (age 64–65); London, England, UK
- Education: Cambridge University
- Occupations: Poet, playwright and novelist
- Notable work: Vauxhall (2013)
- Awards: Tibor Jones Pageturner Prize
- Website: gabrielgbadamosi.com

Gabriel Gbadamosi (born 1961) is a British poet, playwright and novelist of Irish-Nigerian descent. He is the founding editor of the online literary platform WritersMosaic, an initiative of The Royal Literary Fund.

== Biography ==
Gbadamosi was born in London, where he grew up in Vauxhall. He studied English at Cambridge University, earning a BA (Hons) degree.

He held an AHRC Creative and Performing Arts Fellowship at Goldsmiths, University of London (2006–2009), based in the Department of Theatre and Performance and researching with the Pinter Centre for Performance and Creative Writing. He has also lectured in dramaturgy at the University of Istanbul, has been Judith E. Wilson Fellow at the Faculty of English of Cambridge University, director of the Society of Authors, and a presenter of BBC Radio 3's arts programme Night Waves.

=== Writing ===
Gbadamosi's poems have featured in such anthologies as The New Poetry 1968–1988 (1988) and The Heinemann Book of African Poetry in English (1990), and his book collaborations with visual artists include The Second Life of Shells with Mandy Bonnell and Sun-Shine, Moonshine with Conroy Sanderson. His plays include No Blacks, No Irish, Eshu's Faust (Jesus College, Cambridge), Shango (DNA, Amsterdam), Hotel Orpheu (Schaubühne, Berlin), Friday's Daughter (for television), as well as the BBC Radio 3 drama about the Notting Hill Carnival entitled The Long, Hot Summer of '76, which won the first Richard Imison Memorial Award. His 2019 play Stop and Search was staged at the Arcola Theatre, directed by Mehmet Ergen. His most recent play, Abolition, was published in 2023 by flipped eye publishing.

Gbadamosi's first published novel, Vauxhall (2013, Telegram Books, ISBN 9781846591464), described by The Spectator's reviewer as "a book of rare poetic insight and humour that absorbs from start to finish", won the Tibor Jones Pageturner Prize and Best International Novel at the Sharjah Book Fair.

He was elected a Fellow of the Royal Society of Literature in 2024.

=== Other activities ===
In August 2013, Gbadamosi appeared on BBC Radio 4's Great Lives, nominating Nigerian musician Fela Kuti.

Gbadamosi has been a judge for literary prizes including the EBRD Literature Prize, and has been director of Wasafiri magazine and a trustee of the Arcola Theatre.

Gbadamosi is founding editor of Writers Mosaic, an initiative of the Royal Literary Fund that is an online platform to showcase original writing from both new and established writers.

== Selected bibliography ==
- Vauxhall, Telegram Books, 2013, ISBN 9781846591464. French translation by Elizabeth Gilles, Editions Zoé, 2015, ISBN 978-2-88182-952-9
- Stop and Search, Oberon Books/Bloomsbury Publishing, 2019, ISBN 9781786827128
- Abolition, flipped eye publishing, 2023, ISBN 9781905233670
