= Brixton Artists Collective =

The Brixton Artists Collective was a group of artists based in Brixton, London, who ran the Brixton Art Gallery (BAG) from 1983 to 1990.

== History ==
=== 1983 ===
The Brixton Artists Collective took a short lease on an empty carpet shop in Atlantic Road, Brixton, London, in June 1983. The three arches were spacious if a little damp. They allowed huge shows to take place which were decided by an open collective of 20 to 50 people. The only membership requirement was that you should simply turn up. Later a voluntary administrator, Andrew Hurman with the help of a committed core of directors, brought some stability to the place for a few more years. Membership cost a concessionary rate of £2 per year. There were open-themed shows such as the 1984 Show as well as shows made by groups with a shared identity. By October 1983, more than 200 artists had the opportunity to show their work. The first nationally selected exhibition of Work by Gay Women & Men was held as part of the GLC September in the Pink Festival in 1983. Curated by Ian Rogers and Bruce Currie, it was a ground-breaking event. Further shows were held in 1984, 1986, 1991 and 1992, with Eamon Andrews, Guy Burch, Svar Simpson, Mandy McCartin and Christina Berry as co-ordinators. A women's group, Women's Work, formed as soon as the gallery started in the summer of 1983, putting on its first show at the end of November that year. Key members included Rita Keegan, Kate Hayes, Teri Bullen, Roxanne Permar. The group put on annual shows which included more than a hundred women. By the end of its first four shows, 172 women had exhibited. After the second year they self-published a book recording their work. The group was allocated two shows per year in the gallery.

=== 1984 ===
In 1984 the group decided one of those exhibitions should be of work by black women artists. A separate Black Women artists group was formed in 1984 and held their first exhibition, Mirror Reflecting Darkly in June–July 1985. The featured artists included: Brenda Agard, Zarina Bhimji, Jennifer Comrie, Novette Cummings, Valentina Emenyeoni, Carole Enahoro, Elisabeth Jackson, Lallitha Jawahirilal, Rita Keegan, Christine Luboga, Sue Macfarlane, Olusola Oyeleye, Betty Vaughan Richards, Enoyte Wanagho and Paula Williams.

Fertile Eye, the second of the exhibitions organised by the Women's Work group, was held at the gallery in May 1984 with many artists exhibited including Francoise Dupre, Julie Umerle, Roxanne Permer and Shanti Thomas.

=== 1985 ===
By 1985 the membership had increased to nearly 100. By 1986 it had increased to nearly 200 and nearly 1000 artists had shown work in the gallery.

In June 1985 Stefan Szczelkun initiated "Roadworks", which was "ten artists working in public for ten days, documenting the work back in the gallery on a daily basis" (Szczelkun, 1987, p. 9). One of the artists in Roadworks was Mona Hatoum, another was Rasheed Araeen. Both of these, now eminent figures in the art world, had other shows at BAG.

=== 1986 ===
Whole émigré communities had shows, including the South African artist community's show in January 1986: Hazel Carey, one of the forces behind the cultural event, expresses amazement at the "magnetic" effect that the Exhibition /performances seemed to have on visitors. "The sound of music - of things happening - drew children and shoppers off the street".

Exhibitions involving immigrant faces challenged the demand that assimilation meant fitting into English mores or accepting ghettoisation: 'Bigos, artists of Polish origin' group and Casa de la Cultura Latino Americana Comite Cultural Chileno, to name but two. And the Campaign Against Apartheid featured prominently through many exhibitions and included exiled South African artists and the Azanian Group and Creation for Liberation. The South African community had few of the boundaries between art forms that exist in the British contemporary culture. The art show included music, dancing and food - their culture was still integrated with life and this made a strong impression on all those who became involved.

Craft and medium were highlighted in provocative ways, whether the provocative automata of Jan Zalud, Christina Berry's leather cats or Richard Royale's gay-themed banners. Ceramics exhibitors included such diverse names as Kate Mellors, Sarah Radstone, Julian Stair and Pamela Mei Yee Leung many of whom were Lambeth-based and encouraged to exhibit by sculptor Keith King. Painters were diverse from Uzo Egonu and Shati Thomas, to Tony Mo Young and Derek Stockley. Teri Bullen arranged the Soweto Sisters′ Patchwork of Our Lives show in May 1986; she raised funding for all the women members of the collective to come over from Africa to attend the opening in person.

=== 1987 ===
In 1987 the Gallery closed down due to pressure from the landlord British Rail to put up the rent, the demise of the Greater London Council and a lack of will in the funding organisations. The BAG revived for a while in 1988 in "Bon March", Brixton Road, and in 1990 moved to a location in Brixton Station Road.

=== 1990–2005 ===
After a change in the management, the gallery fell under a new directorship with a renewed relationship with the London Borough of Lambeth Council. Artists included David Emmanuel Noel, Salome Smeaton Russell, Paul Jones and Ajamu X. The collective supported greater inclusion and diversity in the representation of exhibitions, talks and events, also involving members of the local community. Among exhibitions mounted were From Where I Stand, the first exhibition featuring black male artists. It ceased to be an open collective in the early 1990s but continued as a gallery and craft space until 2005 when it closed.

A comprehensive history of the Collective period can be found in Brixton Calling! Then & Now: Brixton Artist Gallery & Brixton Artists Collective and Women's Work: Two Years in the Life of a Women Artists Group, Brixton Art Gallery, 1986. An archive of material including catalogues, photographs, posters, artist's CVs and a scale model of the original Gallery made by Guy Burch are in the Tate Archive. Andrew Hurman, a co-director from 1983-86 published an illustrated history of those years.

The gallery was a place for those unable to access mainstream spaces to show their work. Well known names who exhibited often very early in their careers include Mona Hartoum, Zarina Bhimji, Sutapa Biswas, Sokari Douglas Camp, Cathy de Monchaux, Rotimi Fani-Kayode, Jamie Reid, Tina Keane, Sandra Lahire, Peter Kennard, Julie Umerle, Rasheed Araeen, Gavin Jantjes, Hew Locke, Mary Kelly and David Medalla.
