= Richard Ayre =

British media executive

Richard James Ayre (born August 1949) is a former media regulator, former BBC journalist and former member of the BBC Trust, the governing body of the British Broadcasting Corporation until its abolition in 2016. He was also the member for England of the Ofcom Content Board and chair of its Broadcast Review Committee. He started working for the BBC as a radio and television reporter in Belfast through the 1970s, before becoming the Home News Editor in London (1979–84), Head of BBC Westminster (1989–93), Controller of Editorial Policy (1993–96) and Deputy Chief Executive of BBC News (1996–2000).

In retirement he has broadcast from time to time on media issues, and conducted interviews as part of the BBC Oral History Archive project. He is a past trustee of the Egyptian Exploration Society, the charity which has sponsored archaeological excavations and research in Egypt for the past 140 years. In April 2022 he was appointed chair of the board of independent press regulator Impress from which position he stood down in May 2025. He is married to the artist Guy Burch.

== Education ==
Ayre was educated at Hastings Grammar School, a former state grammar school (now known as Ark Alexandra Academy), in the seaside town of Hastings in East Sussex, followed by University College at Durham University, during which time he was President of Durham Students' Union (1970—1971). He was also Editor of Palatinate for Michaelmas term of 1969. His first journalistic scoop was witnessing an escape from Durham prison by John McVicar that he quickly reported in an interview with the BBC's Kate Adie, then a very junior local radio reporter. The incident is described in McVicar's biography McVicar by Himself. Many years later the two met at the BBC.

== BBC ==
As first a news trainee at the BBC, he began his professional career as a reporter in Northern Ireland. In 1988, the then Home Secretary Douglas Hurd banned Sinn Féin from the airwaves in response to Irish Republican Army bombing campaigns. It was seen by many as extremely damaging to freedom of speech and the press in Britain. When Ayre became Controller of Editorial Policy he took legal advice and was satisfied that the prohibition could not stop the use of actors' voices to replace the more cumbersome use of subtitling. This is credited as having rendered the prohibition increasingly ridiculous. In 1980, during the Iranian embassy siege Ayre interviewed the terrorists by phone.

Ayre also re-wrote the BBC's Producer Guidelines into the most comprehensive manual of programme-making ethics, which became a model for many broadcasters worldwide. He established Britain's first bi-media (television and radio) centre at BBC Millbank, introducing the first digital editing to British network journalism. In 1995, Ayre played a key part in steering the Panorama interview with Diana, Princess of Wales to air – a decision which infuriated the BBC's then Chairman Marmaduke Hussey. Lords Hall and Birt have declined to be interviewed about the débâcle and, with the death of Steve Hewlett, Ayre has been the only person directly concerned prepared to be interviewed about it and the subsequent controversy caused by the actions of the reporter Martin Bashir.

In March 2010, the government announced that Ayre was to join the BBC Trust - the governing body of the Corporation - replacing fellow journalist Richard Tait. Reappointed in 2014, Ayre chaired the Editorial Standards committee of the Trust, the final court of appeal for audience complaints about BBC content.

== Freedom of Information ==
Richard Ayre became a founder member of the board of the Food Standards Agency, which pioneered open access with web casts of board meetings and fully published documentation. He was Chair of Article 19 (2003-2005), and was Freedom of Information Adjudicator for the Law Society (2001-2015). He led Ofcom's 2007 enquiry into abuse of premium rate telephone services in television programmes. He conducted a review of broadcasting in Kuwait following the invasion by Iraq, and following the allied invasion he chaired the Editorial Review Board for Al Mirbad – the first independent Iraqi-run radio and TV station.
