= Joan Ann Maynard =

British actress

- Education: Central School of Speech and Drama
- Occupation: Actress
- Known for: Artistic director of Black Theatre Co-operative
- Notable credit(s): Within These Walls; Desmond's
- Spouse: Errol Lloyd (m. 1977)

Joan Ann Maynard is a British actress who has worked both on stage and on television. She has also been influential as a director, arts administrator and teacher. Her most notable television roles are as Avice in the 1975 series Within These Walls and as Beverley in the Channel Four TV comedy show Desmond's, which ran from 1989 to 1994, as well as roles in other series, among them The Bill on ITV. Maynard has additionally been involved with producing black theatre, having been artistic director of the Black Theatre Co-operative and chair of the Black Theatre Forum.

== Background ==
Joan Ann Maynard was born in Guyana and from the age of nine was brought up in east London. She went to St Angela's Ursuline Convent School, Upton Park, and subsequently studied at the Central School of Speech and Drama. Formerly Artistic Director of the Black Theatre Co-operative (now NitroBeat), Maynard later worked as the head of arts subjects in Chiswick School, London.

Maynard's theatre work includes in Sweet Talk by Michael Abbensetts, staged at the Royal Court Theatre in 1973, Playboy of the West Indies by Mustapha Matura at the Oxford Playhouse, Tricycle Theatre and on tour, later being screened on BBC Television, and Trinidad Sisters (based on Anton Chekov's Three Sisters) at the Donmar Warehouse.

== Personal life ==
In 1977, she married artist Errol Lloyd.
