= Kobena Mercer =

British art historian and writer

Kobena Mercer (born 1960) is a British art historian and writer on contemporary art and visual culture. His writing on Robert Mapplethorpe and Rotimi Fani-Kayode has been described as "among the most incisive (and delightful to read) critiques of simple identity-based politics in the field of cultural studies."

== Life and work ==
Mercer was born in London in 1960. He was educated in Ghana and England and graduated with a bachelor's degree in Fine Art at Saint Martins School of Art. He gained his doctorate by completing a PhD at Goldsmiths College in 1990.

Much of Mercer's writing has focused on the work and cultural context of black British artists, including monographs for Keith Piper, Rotimi Fani-Kayode and Hew Locke – as well as on contemporary and modern art of the African Diaspora more widely. He has contributed essays to numerous anthologies in the fields of cultural studies and contemporary art, including his own, groundbreaking volume, Welcome to the Jungle: New Positions in Black Cultural Studies, published in 1994. Mercer was commissioned to contribute "New Practices, New Identities: Hybridity and Globalization," the closing chapter in the epic series The Image of the Black in Western Art, Volume V, The Twentieth Century (Harvard University Press, 2014).

In 2006, Mercer won the inaugural Clark Prize for excellence in art writing. Alongside his work as a writer, Mercer also has a distinguished international career as an academic, teaching first at Middlesex University and, more recently, as Professor of History of Art and African American Studies at Yale. It was announced in February 2021 that Bard College had appointed Mercer the Charles P. Stevenson Chair in Art History and the Humanities, and that he would assume the position in fall 2021.

In 2023, Mercer received a PEN Oakland/Josephine Miles Literary Award for Alain Locke & The Visual Arts (Yale University Press, 2022).

== Selected bibliography ==
- Kobena Mercer (1994). Welcome to the Jungle: New Positions in Black Cultural Studies. Routledge. ISBN 9780415906357.
- Kobena Mercer; David Chandler; Gilane Tawadros (1997). Keith Piper: Relocating the Remains. InIVA. ISBN 978-1899846108.
- Kobena Mercer (2003). James Van Der Zee 55. Phaidon. ISBN 978-0714841694.
- Kobena Mercer, ed. (2008). Exiles, Diasporas and Strangers (Annotating Art's Histories: Cross-Cultural Perspectives in the Visual Arts). The MIT Press. ISBN 978-0262633581.
- Kobena Mercer, ed. (2005). Cosmopolitan Modernisms. Institute of International Visual Arts (INIVA). ISBN 978-1899846412.
- "New Practices, New Identities: Hybridity and Globalization" in David Bindman and Henry Louis Gates Jr., ed. (2014). The Image of the Black in Western Art, Volume V, The Twentieth Century. Harvard University Press.
