= Conroy Sanderson =

British contemporary artists' collaboration

- Born: Neil Conroy and Lesley Sanderson
- Known for: Contemporary Art
- Website: https://www.axisweb.org/p/conroysanderson/#info

Conroy Sanderson is the collaborative name of the contemporary artists Neil Conroy and Lesley Sanderson, who have worked together since 1998.

Their practice examines identity and hybridity, creating critical dialogues on race, gender, culture, nationality and identity. Though the artists use self-portraits in their work, their identities are often hidden or disguised. They use mixed media, photography, drawing and video, often combined into installations.

== Selected exhibitions ==
- 2018: Here I Am, Millennium Gallery, Sheffield.
- 2017: Public View, Bluecoat Gallery, Liverpool.
- 2016: Now! Now! In more than one place, Chelsea School of Art, London.
- 2014: The Negligent Eye, Bluecoat, Liverpool.
- 2009: Negotiable Values, Chinese Art Centre, Manchester & 501 Artspace, Chongqing, China.
- 2008; Out of Nowhere, Chinese Art Centre, Manchester.
- 2008: East-South: Out of Sight, Guangzhou Triennial, China.
- 2007: Landmark, Bergen Kunsthall, Norway.
- 2006: 37 Seconds, Programme Thirteen, BBC Big Screen, Liverpool.
- 2006: Cruel/Loving Bodies 2, Hong Kong Arts Centre, Hong Kong.
- 2006: Distance, Galerie 5020, Salzburg, Germany.
- 2005: here we are, PM Gallery and House, London.
- 2003: Elsewhere, Crawford Art Gallery, Cork, Ireland.
- 2000: 7/5, Leeds Metropolitan Gallery, Leeds.
