= Rianna Jade Parker =

British writer, curator and researcher

- Born: 1991 (age 34–35); South London
- Education: University of London

Rianna Jade Parker (born 1991 in south London) is a British writer, critic, curator and researcher based in South London whose work stems from her interest in internationalist Black cultural production. She is a founding member of the interdisciplinary collective Thick/er Black Lines and a contributing editor of frieze.

== Early life and education ==
Parker was born in 1991 in South London. She received a MA in Contemporary Art Theory from Goldsmiths College, University of London.

== Work ==
Parker's writing has been published in Frieze, Artforum, ARTnews, BOMB, and Art in America.

Parker and Kamara Scott jointly curated War Inna Babylon: The Community’s Struggle for Truths and Rights, an exhibition held at the Institute of Contemporary Arts in London. The show takes on the history of Black British communities working against and at the center of institutional racism and policing. The exhibition was organized with the Tottenham Rights community and advocacy groups. The show's concept began with a focus on a work by Forensic Architecture that recreated the scene and circumstances of the police murder of Mark Duggan in 2011, titled The Killing of Mark Duggan. Parker, Scott and Tottenham Rights helped to expand the scope more broadly to look at the impacts of that killing and add a historical framework to understand what Black Britons have endured in the face of institutional racism and policing.

== Selected works ==
- Parker, Rianna Jade (2021). Brief History of Black British Art. S.l.: Tate Publishing. ISBN 978-1-84976-756-9. OCLC 1237252164.
