= Nicola Frimpong =

British artist

Nicola Frimpong, also known as Freakpong (born 1987) is a British artist. She tackles themes of sex, race and violence using watercolour and digital images.

== Life ==
Nicola Frimpong was born in Epsom in 1987.

Frimpong's 2012 drawing The Accidental Birth of Nicola – I Should Have Been Born a Boy (2012) pictured pink and brown figures caught up in various sexual and suicidal acts. Untitled (White Slaves), also from 2012, staged a reversal of the racial violence of the transatlantic slave trade, picturing naked, white, shackled bodies incarcerated in a metal cage while Black onlookers assumed "the roles of auctioneer, trader, voyeur, abuser and violater".

In 2014 Frimpong was interviewed as part of African Diaspora Artists in the 21st Century, a collaboration between King's College London's Department of International Development and the Institute of International Visual Arts (Iniva).

Frimpong was chosen by the Royal Society of British Artists for their 2021 Rising Stars exhibition.
