= Grace Belgravia =

Women's only members club in London

Coordinates: 51.4988°N 0.1568°W

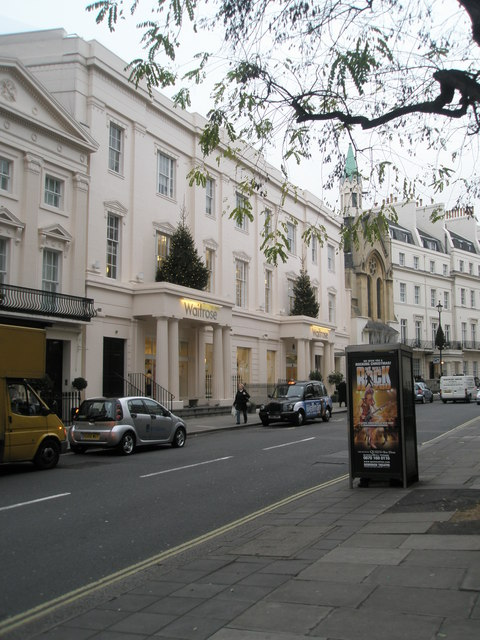
The building which housed the club

Grace Belgravia was a private member's club which with female only membership. The club was located in Belgravia, London inside a Grade II listed building. It was opened in 2012 and shut its doors in 2019 citing Brexit as the cause for its closure.

Private member's clubs or gentlemen's clubs in London have a history of excluding women from membership as well as women being banned from entering, with many continuing to do so to this day. A BBC article claimed it to be the "first female-only club", although there have been many historic examples of women only clubs, often as counterparts to gentlemen's clubs, such as the Alexandra Club and the University Women's Club.

The club's philosophy was to provide a space for relaxation and mindfulness away from the busyness of life. The club included a spa.

Among the club's membership were many notable figures including Princess Eugenie, Pippa Middleton, and Cara Delevingne.
