= Rudi Patterson =

Jamaican actor, painter and potter (1933 –2013)

Rudi Patterson (29 September 1933 – 24 July 2013) was a Jamaican-born actor and painter and potter. Known for his work as an actor in theatre, film and television, he became a self-taught painter later in life and was known for his colourful, "intuitive" depictions of life in the Caribbean. His work was collected by Freddie Mercury, Twiggy and Stevie Wonder.

Patterson appeared in early episodes of the television series Z-Cars, The Professionals, in the film Two a Penny opposite Cliff Richard, and in The Rolling Stones 1968 documentary film Sympathy For The Devil.

The first retrospective of Patterson's work, co-curated by Wesley Kerr and Novelette-Aldoni Stewart, was held at Leighton House Museum in 2014.
