= Rotimi Fani-Kayode =

Nigerian photographer (1955–1989)

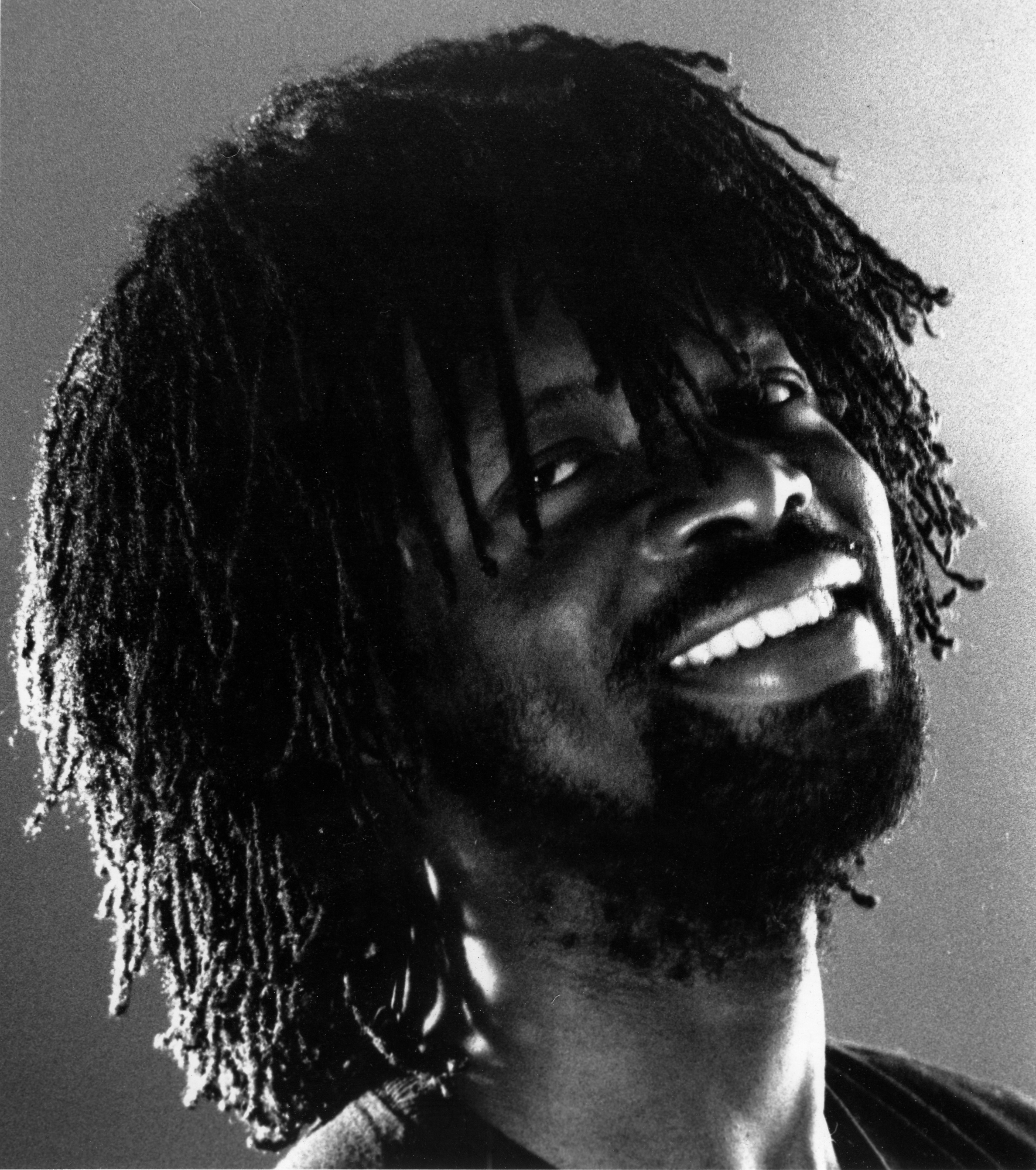
- Born: Oluwarotimi Adebiyi Wahab Fani-Kayode; 20 April 1955; Lagos, British Nigeria
- Died: 21 December 1989 (aged 34); London, United Kingdom
- Citizenship: British Nigerian
- Occupation: Photographer
- Known for: Co-founder, Autograph ABP

Rotimi Fani-Kayode (20 April 1955 – 21 December 1989), born Oluwarotimi Adebiyi Wahab Fani-Kayode, was a Nigerian photographer who at the age of 11 moved with his family to England, fleeing from the Biafran War. A seminal figure in British contemporary art, Fani-Kayode explored the tensions created by sexuality, race and culture through stylised portraits and compositions. From 1982-1989, he created the bulk of his work leading up to his death of AIDS related complications.

== Early life and education ==
Rotimi Fani-Kayode was born in Lagos, Nigeria, on 20 April 1955. His father, Chief Babaremilekun Adetokunboh Fani-Kayode (1921–1995), was a politician and chieftain of Ifẹ, an ancestral Yoruba city. His mother was Chief (Mrs.) Adia Adunni Fani-Kayode (nee Sa'id) (1931–2001). Rotimi had four siblings, including Femi Fani-Kayode, his younger brother.

The Fani-Kayode family moved to Brighton, England, in 1966, after the military coup and the ensuing civil war in Nigeria. Rotimi went to a number of British private schools for his secondary education, including Brighton College, Seabright College, and Millfield, and then moved to the United States in 1976.

He earned his BA degree in Fine Arts and Economics from Georgetown University, Washington, D.C., in 1980, and his MFA degree in Fine Arts and Photography at the Pratt Institute in 1983. While studying at Pratt, Fani-Kayode became friendly with Robert Mapplethorpe, who he claimed had an influence on his work.

== Work ==
After graduating from Pratt, Fani-Kayode returned to the UK, where he became a member of the Brixton Artists Collective, exhibiting initially in some of the group shows held at the Brixton Art Gallery before going on to show at other exhibition spaces in London. Fani-Kayode's work explored Baroque themes, sexuality, racism, colonialism and the tensions and conflicts between his homosexuality and his Yoruba upbringing. His relationship with the Yoruba religion began with his parents. Fani-Kayode stated that his parents were devotees of Ifa, the oracle orisha, and keepers of Yoruba shrines, an early experience that may have informed his work. With this legacy, he set out on the quest to fuse desire, ritual, and the black male body. His religious experiences encouraged him to emulate the Yoruba technique of possession, through which Yoruba priests communicate with the gods and experience ecstasy. An example of such relations between Fani-Kayode's photographs and the Yoruba "technique of ecstasy" is displayed in his work "Bronze Head" (1987). His goal was to communicate with the audience's unconscious mind and to combine Yoruba and Western ideals (specifically Christianity), fusing aesthetic and religious eroticism.

Describing his art as "Black, African, homosexual photography", Fani-Kayode and many others considered him to be an outsider and a depiction of diaspora. He believed that due to this depiction of himself, it helped shape his work as a photographer. In interviews, he spoke on his experience of being an outsider in terms of the African diaspora. His exile from Nigeria at an early age affected his sense of wholeness. He experienced feeling as if he had "very little to lose". However, his identity was then shaped from his sense of otherness, and it was celebrated. In his work, Fani-Kayode's subjects are specifically black men, but he almost always asserts himself as the black man in most of his work, which can be interpreted as a performative and visual representation of his personal history. Using the body as the centralized point in his photography, he was able to explore the relationship between erotic fantasy and his ancestral spiritual values. His complex experience of dislocation, fragmentation, rejection, and separation all shaped his work.

=== Yoruba Influences ===
In "Sonponnoi" (1987), there is a headless black figure, decorated in white and black spots, holding three burning candles on his groin. Sonponnoi is one of the most powerful orishas in the Yoruba pantheon; he is the god of smallpox. Fani-Kayode adorned the figure with spots to represent a Sonponnoi's smallpox and Yoruba tribal marks. The triple-burning candle on his groin evokes the sense that sexuality continues even in sickness/otherness. It also represents how the Christian faith replaced the Yoruba tradition while also bringing disease with it during colonialism.

Fani-Kayode frequently referenced Esu, the messenger and crossroads deity who is often characterised with an erect penis, in his work. Fani-Kayode would engrave an erect penis in many of his images to describe his own fluid experience with sexuality. His ''Black Male, White Male'' intersects his racial and sexual themes with subtle displays of a devotee-deity relationship. Speaking on Esu, he insists: "Eshu presides here [...] He is the Trickster, the Lord of the Crossroads (mediator between the genders), sometimes changing the signposts to lead us astray [...] It is perhaps through that rebirth will occur." Esu also appears in Fani-Kayode's photography, Nothing to Lose IX. The presence of Esu is understood in the colouring of the mask; using white, red, and black stripes the mask stands as a representation of the deity Esu. Although these colours symbolise Esu, the mask itself has no precedence in traditional African mask-making; this subtle theme is almost flattening the mask to represent an overarching "African-ness" (a critique of the notion of "primitiveness" that was widely digested by a European audience).

Fani-Kayode's posthumous project, "Communion" (1995), reflects his complex relationship with the Yoruba religion, a "tranquility of communion with the spiritual world". One of the images in the series, "The Golden Phallus", is of a man with a bird-like mask looking at the viewer, with his penis suspended on a piece of string. The image has been described as an ironic representation of how black masculinity has been burdened by the Western world. In this image ("The Golden Phallus"), as in Fani-Kayode's Bronze Head, there is a focus on liminality, spirituality, political power, and cultural history—taking ideals seen as "ancient" (in the display of "classical" African art) and re-introducing them as a contemporary archetype.

Fani-Kayode's "Bronze Head" (1987) shows a cropped figure's black body that reveals his legs and butt as he is about to sit on top of a bronze Ife sculpture. The Ife sculpture is placed on a round platter, stool, or pedestal, and is placed strategically at the centre of the picture frame. Typically, the bronze head in the photograph is meant to honour the Ife king. However, in the context of Fani-Kayode's photograph, it satirizes the Yoruba kingship institution. The photograph represents both his exile and homosexuality, two core parts of his world.

=== Surrealism ===
Fani-Kayode's photography is representative of non-western surrealism. His surrealist work takes influence from his Yoruba background and artist like Eikoh Hosoe. He does this through the fragmented representation of the Black male body as it relates to power, desire, and sexuality. Fani-Kayode's work was largely displayed in intimate publications and gallery spaces. His work was primarily for the Queer community and later gained a global audience.

=== Notable Works ===
- Adebiyi
- Every Moment Counts II
- Collection at the Tate

== Death ==
Fani-Kayode died at Coppetts Wood Hospital, North London, of a heart attack while recovering from an AIDS-related illness on 21 December 1989. At the time of his death, he was living in Brixton, London, with his partner of six years and frequent collaborator Alex Hirst, who died of AIDS in 1992. Following Hirst's death, researchers have questioned whether the work that Fani-Kayode and Hirst created individually or as a team was accurately attributed to Fani-Kayode, Hirst, or the pair.

== Legacy ==
In 1988, Fani-Kayode with a number of other photographers, including Sunil Gupta, Monika Baker, Merle Van den Bosch, Pratibha Parmar, Ingrid Pollard, Roshini Kempadoo and Armet Francis, co-founded the Association of Black Photographers (now known as Autograph ABP). Many of these artists were featured in the 1986 exhibit Reflections of the Black Experience, at Brixton Artists Collective. A prominent figure in the Black British art scene, Fani-Kayode served as the first chair of Autograph ABP and an active member of the Black Audio Film Collective.

Fani-Kayode challenged the invisibility of "African queerness", or the denial of alternative African sexualities, in both the Western and African worlds. In general, he sought to reshape the ideas of sexuality and gender in his photography, showing that sexuality and gender appear rigid and "fixed" because of cultural and social norms but are actually fluid and subjective. However, he specifically sought to develop queerness in contemporary African art, which required him to address the colonial and Christian legacies that suppressed queerness and constructed harmful notions of black masculinity. In a time when African artists were not being represented, he provocatively approached the issue by addressing and questioning the objectification of black bodies. His homoerotic influences in using the black male body can be interpreted as an expression of idealisation, of desire and being desired, and self-consciousness in response to the black body being reduced to a spectacle. He was able to show the world and those in the art world just how much queer black voices matter. Telling their sides of the story and not just being the subject of someone else's depiction of them.

Not only is Fani-Kayode praised for his conceptual imagery of Africanness and queerness (and African queerness), he is also praised for his ability to fuse racial and sexual politics with religious eroticism and beauty. One critic has also described his work as "neo-romantic", with the idea his images evoke a sense of fleeting beauty.

His work is imbued with subtlety, irony, and political and social comment. He also contributed to the artistic debate surrounding HIV/AIDS.

== Collections ==
Fani-Kayode is considered to be one of the most important artists of the 1980s, and his work appears in several public and private collections, including those of the Guggenheim Museum, Kiasma-Museum of Contemporary Art, Tate, The Hutchins Center, The Walther Collection, Victoria & Albert Museum, Yinka Shonibare CBE, and others.

== Exhibitions ==
Fani-Kayode started to exhibit in 1984, and participated in numerous exhibitions up until the time of his death in 1989. His work has been exhibited in the United Kingdom, France, Austria, Italy, Nigeria, Sweden, Germany, South Africa, and the US.

- No Comment, group show, Brixton Artists Collective, December 1984
- Seeing Diversity, group show, Brixton Artists Collective, February 1985
- Annual Members Show, group show, Brixton Artists Collective, November 1985
- South West Arts, group exhibition, Bristol, 1985
- Rotimi Fani-Kayode, one person show, Riverside Studios, London, 1986
- Same Difference, group show, Camerawork, July 1986
- Oval House Theatre, group exhibition, London, 1987
- The Invisible Man, group show, Goldsmith's Gallery, 1988
- ÁBÍKU - Born to Die, one-person show, Centre 181 Gallery (Hammersmith), September/October 1988
- US/UK Photography Exchange, touring group show, Camerawork & Jamaica Arts Centre, New York, 1989
- Ecstatic Antibodies: Resisting the AIDS Mythology, Touring group exhibition, Curated by Sunil Gupta and Tessa Boffin, Impressions Gallery, York; Ikon Gallery, Birmingham; Battersea Arts Centre, London, 1990
- Rotimi Fani-Kayode: Retrospective, 198 Gallery, 1990
- In/Sight, modern and contemporary African photography exhibition, Guggenheim Museum, New York, 1996
- African Pavilion, group exhibition, Venice Biennale, 2003
- Rotimi Fani-Kayode, one person show, Hutchins Center, Harvard, Cambridge, Massachusetts, 2009
- ARS 11, group exhibition, Kiasma Museum of Contemporary Art, Helsinki, 2011
- Rotimi Fani-Kayode, one person show, Rivington Place, London, 2011
- Rotimi Fani-Kayode, one person show, Iziko South African National Gallery, Cape Town, 2014
- Rotimi Fani-Kayode, one person show, Tiwani Contemporary, London, 2014
- Rotimi Fani-Kayode, one person show, Palitz Gallery, Lubin House, Syracuse University, New York, 2016
- Rotimi Fani-Kayode, one person show, Hales Project Room, New York, 2018
- African Cosmologies: Photography, Time, and the Other, FotoFest Biennial 2020, Houston, TX, 2020
- Rotimi Fani-Kayode, 1955–1989, Iceberg Project, Chicago, IL, 2020
- Greater New York 2022, a group show of 47 artists and collectives, MoMA PS1, New York, 2022
- One Nation Underground: Punk Visual Culture 1976–1985, Georgetown University, 2022
- Rotimi Fani-Kayode (1955–1989), Georgetown University, 2022
- Rotimi Fani-Kayode: Tranquility of Communion, "the first North American survey of Fani-Kayode’s work and archives," Wexner Center for the Arts, 2024–2025.
- The Studio – Staging Desire, Autograph Gallery, Shoreditch, London, 2024–2025.
- Rotimi Fani-Kayode: Tranquility Of Communion, The Polygon Gallery, Vancouver, 2025
- Rotimi Fani-Kayode: Forest of Metaphor, one person show, Hales Gallery, New York, 2026

== Publications ==
- Communion. London: Autograph, 1986.
- Black Male/White Male. London: Gay Men's Press, 1988. Photographs by Fani-Kayode, text by Alex Hirst. The "only solo collection of his works to appear during his life."
- Bodies of Experience: Stories about Living with HIV – a group show at Camerawork in 1989
- Autoportraits. Camerawork RF-K March 1990 (He was included in the publicity for the exhibition but work was not shown due to his sudden death in December 1989).
- Memorial Retrospective Exhibition. 198 Gallery, December 1990 (Brian Kennedy, City Limits magazine, makes a request for donations to fund the exhibition.) Poster-catalogue essays by Alex Hirst and Stuart Hall.
- (With Alex Hirst) Rotimi Fani-Kayode and Alex Hirst: Photographs. Autograph ABP, London, 1996.
- Decolonising the Camera. Lawrence & Wishart: 2019. By Mark Sealy, pages 226–232.
- And Bloodflowers: Rotimi Fani-Kayode, Photography and the 1980s. Duke University Press: 2019. By W Ian Bourland.
