= Jagjit Chuhan =

Indian-British artist and curator

Jagjit Chuhan (born 1955) is an Indian-British artist, art curator and art lecturer. She is Professor of International Art at Liverpool John Moores University.

== Life ==
Jagjit Chuhan was born in 1955 in Punjab, India. She trained at the Slade School of Fine Art from 1973 to 1977.

Chuhan became Reader in Eclecticism in Art, and chair of the Centre for Art International Research (CAIR), at Liverpool John Moores University. In 1999 she collaborated with Laura Arison on 'an intimate mosaic' at the Senate House of the University of Liverpool. She also co-curated 'Lines of Desire', a drawing exhibition which toured internationally in 1999.

== Works ==
=== Exhibitions ===
- 'New North', Tate Gallery Liverpool, 1991
- 'Indian Winter', Kapil Jariwala Gallery, London, 1995
- 'In the Looking Glass', Usher Gallery, Lincoln, 1996
- 'A long way from home – a painter's journey: new work by J. Chuhan', Lowry Centre, 2002–3.
- 'Parampara: Portraits by J. Chuhan - New perceptions of the British/South Asian experience', Shisha, Manchester, 2004.
- 'J Chuhan: Recent Paintings', Victoria Gallery & Museum, Liverpool, 2013.

=== Books ===
- (ed.) Responses – intercultural drawing practice. Liverpool : Liverpool School of Art and Design (Centre for Art International Research), 2001.
- (ed. with Angela Dimitrakaki and Emma Thomas) Re: trace dialogues : essays on contemporary art and culture. Liverpool: Liverpool School of Art and Design (Centre for Art International Research), 2002.
- (ed. with Fareda Khan and Sheila Maddison) Reflections: in conversation with artists from Bangladesh, India, Pakistan and Sri Lanka. Manchester: Shisha, 2004.
