= Fowokan =

Jamaican-born visual artist (born 1943)

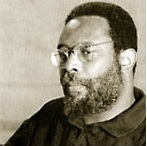
- Born: Kenness George Kelly; 1 April 1943 (age 83); Kingston, Jamaica
- Education: Self-taught
- Known for: Sculpture
- Notable work: Say it Loud (2001), Property of a Gentleman 1807 (c. 1996),
- Patrons: W. E. B. Du Bois Institute; National Portrait Gallery

George "Fowokan" Kelly (born 1 April 1943) is a Jamaican-born visual artist who lives in Britain and exhibits using the name "Fowokan" (a Yoruba word roughly meaning: "one who creates with the hand"). He is a largely self-taught artist, who has been practising sculpture since 1980. His work is full of the ambivalence he sees in the deep-rooted spiritual and mental conflict between the African and the European. Fowokan's work is rooted in the traditions of pre-colonial Africa and ancient Egypt rather than the Greco-Roman art of the west. He has also been a jeweller, essayist, poet and musician (a former member of the funk group Cymande in the early 1970s).

== Background and career ==
Born as Kenness George Kelly in Kingston, Jamaica, he migrated to Britain in 1957 and lived in Brixton, South London.

He decided to become an artist while on a visit to Benin, Nigeria, in the mid-1970s. He had travelled as a musician to Nigeria, where he experienced some kind of spiritual transformation or enlightenment. He returned to London determined to acquire knowledge of the technique of sculpture, which he was able to find in books and through trial and error. Coming to the visual arts comparatively late in life, he deliberately chose not to be trained in western institutions, which he felt could not teach him what he wanted to know, they being too deeply entrenched in their own traditions with little or no understanding or interest in the things that interested him most – the ideas behind the art and culture of Africa.

The philosophical aspect of his oeuvre came with his travels through various parts of Africa, exploring the spiritual side of his ancestral home. He believes the intuitive/spiritual aspect of reality that still abounds in Africa was his art school and university. He has also written essays that have been published in books and magazines.

In 2011 Fowokan featured in "Better than Good", an arts education initiative to highlight the achievements of Black artists in Britain. His work was shown prominently in the exhibition No Colour Bar: Black British Art in Action 1960–1990, held at the Guildhall Art Gallery between July 2015 and January 2016.

The biography Becoming Fowokan: The Life and Works of Fowokan George Kelly, by Margaret Andrews, was published in January 2022.

== Concepts ==
Kelly sees African art not as art in the western sense but as creations associated with religion, magic and ritual. The encounter between the African and the European has brought about deep-rooted spiritual and mental conflicts at the core of the African, along with the belief that the African is nothing more than "the reflection of a primitive and barbarous mentality". Kelly believes that art has an important role to play in the struggle to define and redefine a contemporary African world-view. In today's African artists' work, he argues, we must see the eyes and hands of the contemporary artist, looking anew, through the prism of an African aesthetic, speaking in a new world with the voices of the ancestors, voices for so long silenced; in doing so, their art will offer new generations the opportunity to look again with fresh eyes, to see themselves in new ways.

The primary motifs of Kelly's practice are naturalistic portraits, such as his bust of Mary Seacole. But he also introduces forms that allude to a fascination with Africa and the African Diaspora, such as The Lost Queen of Pernambuco — a sculpture inspired by the story of a settlement of Africans who, across the 18th and 19th centuries, escaped enslavement and lived as a community on the border of Brazil and Dutch Guiana for 90 years, only to be re-captured due to their lack of vigilance. — which, according to Nerve magazine, "has a beauty that overwhelms".

== Collections ==
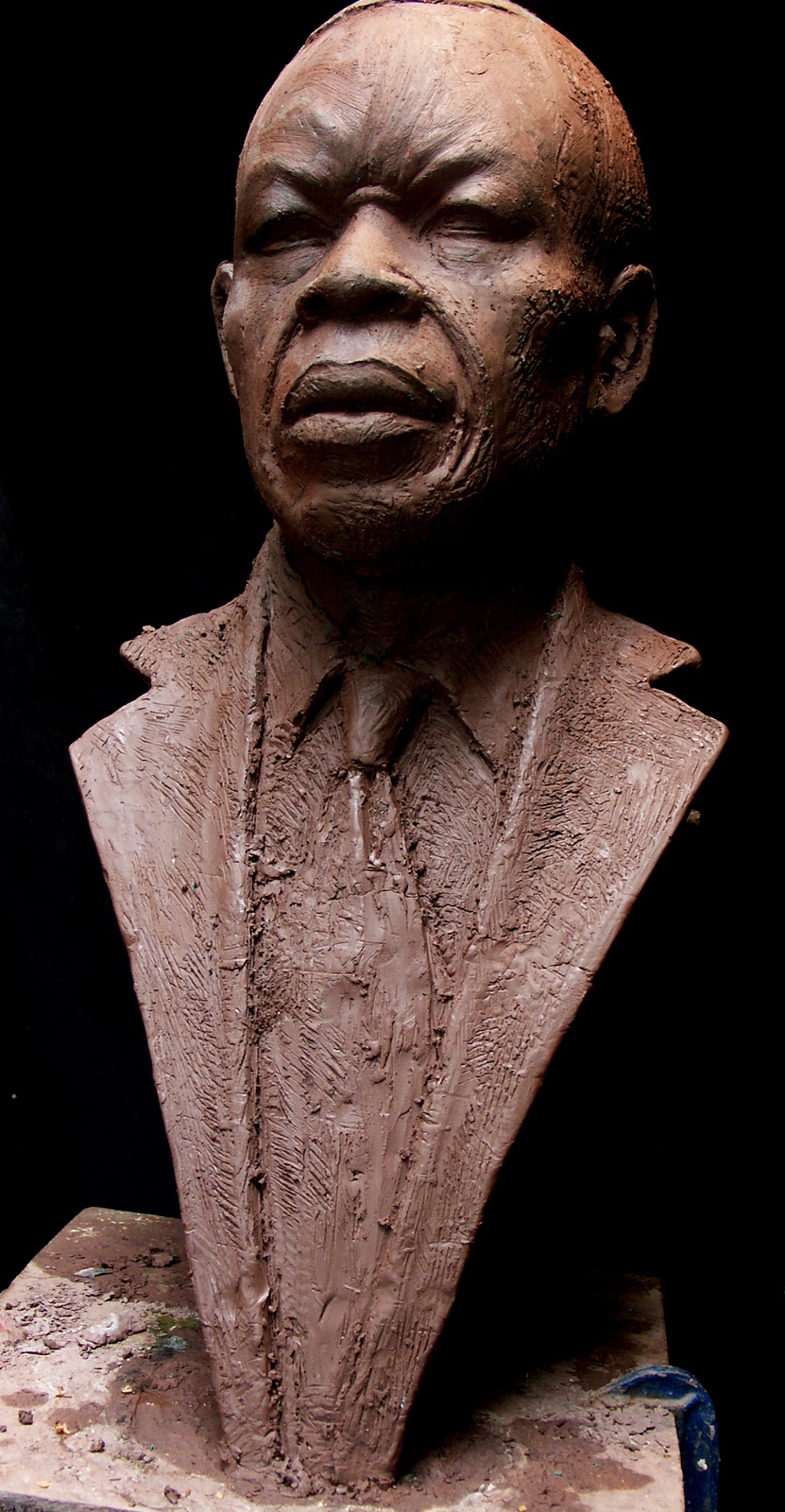
Bust of Len Garrison by Fowokan (2000)

Examples of Kelly's work are held in many public and private art collections, including that of the W. E. B. Du Bois Institute at Harvard University, Unilever and the National Portrait Gallery, London. In the mid-1980s, he exhibited in the ground-breaking "Creation for Liberation" series of group exhibitions organised in Brixton, South London, by Linton Kwesi Johnson and his colleagues in the Race Today Collective. Kelly's work has also been shown at the Studio Museum, New York, and the British Museum, London.

== Selected exhibitions ==
- 1982: Brixton Art Gallery inaugural exhibition
- 1983: Creation for Liberation: Open Exhibition Contemporary Black Art in Britain, St Matthews Meeting, London
- 1984: Art in Exile, The Black Art Gallery, London
- 1985: From Generation to Generation, Midlands Art Centre, Birmingham. Installation by the OBAALA Arts Cooperative including David A. Bailey, Sonia Boyce, Shakka Dedi, George Kelly, and Keith Piper.
- 1985: New Horizons, Royal Festival Hall, London
- 1987: Three Dimensions, The Black Art Gallery, London
- 1989: Three Brixton Artists: Pearl Alcock, George Kelly, Michael Ross, 198 Gallery, London
- 1990: Havana Biennial, Cuba
- 1991: The Royal Academy of Art Summer Show, London
- 1994: Beyond My Grandfather’s Dreams, Jamaican High Commission, London
- 1997: Transforming the Crown, Studio Museum Harlem, New York
- 1999–2005: The Royal Academy of Art Summer Show, London, 1991
- 1999–2006: Society of Portrait Sculptors exhibition at The Gallery Cork Street, London
- 2007: Inhuman Traffic: The Business of the Slave Trade, The British Museum, London
- 2008: Hawkins & Co, Contemporary Urban Centre, Liverpool
- 2011: From Bronze to Gold Exhibition, Rich Mix, London
- 2015: No Colour Bar: Black British Art in Action 1960–1990, Guildhall Art Gallery, London
