= Sunil Gupta (photographer) =

Indian-born Canadian photographer (born 1953)

- Born: 1953 (age 72–73); New Delhi, India
- Education: Concordia University (BCom); The New School for Social Research; West Surrey College of Art and Design; Royal College of Art (MA); University of Westminster (PhD)
- Awards: MBE (2026)

Sunil Gupta MBE (born 1953) is an Indian-born Canadian photographer, based in London, England. His work explores themes of sexual identity, migration, race, and family. Gupta has produced a number of books and his work is held in the collections including the Museum of Modern Art in New York, Philadelphia Museum of Art, and Tate. In 2020, he was awarded Honorary Fellowship of the Royal Photographic Society. He was awarded an Member of the Order of the British Empire (MBE) in the 2026 Birthday Honours for services to art and to the LGBTQ+ communities.

== Early life and education ==
Sunil Gupta was born in New Delhi, India, in 1953. He attended St. Columba's High School in New Delhi until 1969. In 1969, Gupta migrated to Montreal, Canada, with his family. There, he attended High School of Montreal until 1970. From 1970-1972, he studied at Dawson College, Montreal.

From 1972–1977, Gupta studied for a Bachelor of Commerce in Accountancy at Concordia University, Montreal. Whilst there, he embraced his sexuality for the first time. He joined a campus gay liberation movement group and took photographs for its newspaper.

In 1976, Gupta studied photography under Philip Halsman and Lisette Model at The New School for Social Research, New York City. From 1978–1981 he studied for a diploma in photography at West Surrey College of Art and Design, Farnham, UK. From 1981–1983 he gained an MA in photography at the Royal College of Art in London. In 2018, he gained a PhD at the University of Westminster, London (2018).

== Work ==
Gupta's career has been spent "making work responding to the injustices suffered by gay men across the globe, himself included", including themes of sexual identity, migration, race, family and decolonisation. His work is fundamentally political, exploring the politics of his own life as a queer, Asian man.

Gupta's series include the street photography of Christopher Street (1976); Reflections of the Black Experience (1986); Pretended Family Relationships (1988); Memorials (1995); the narrative portraits of From Here to Eternity (1999); and the highly staged and constructed scenes of The New Pre-Raphaelites (2008).

Gupta has described his portraiture as a "constructed documentary style". He has also created self-portraits, such as in his series Here to Eternity (1999), which was made partly in response to a period of illness brought on by HIV.

== Career ==
In 1983, Gupta moved to London.

In 1988, Gupta was one of the founders of the Association of Black Photographers (now Autograph ABP) in London.

In 2019, he served on the jury that chose Susan Meiselas for the Deutsche Börse Photography Foundation Prize.

From 2020-2021, Gupta held the exhibition From Here to Eternity: Sunil Gupta. A Retrospective at the Photographer's Gallery in London. The exhibition featured images from his series The New Pre-Raphelites (2008) and Sun City (2010), amongst others.

Gupta was appointed a Member of the Order of the British Empire (MBE) in the 2026 Birthday Honours for services to art and to the LGBTQ+ communities.

== Personal life ==
Gupta is married to Charan Singh, also a photographer. They live in Camberwell, south London.

Gupta was diagnosed with HIV in 1995.

== Publications ==
=== Books of work by Gupta ===
- Pictures From Here. 2003. ISBN 0-9542813-2-2.
- Wish you Were Here: Memories of a gay life. New Delhi: Yoda, 2008. ISBN 978-81-906668-0-0.
- Queer. Prestel, 2011. ISBN 9783791350998.
- Christopher Street 1976. London: Stanley/Barker, 2018. ISBN 9781916410688.
- Lovers: Ten Years On. London: Stanley/Barker, 2020. ISBN 978-1-913288-12-9.
- London '82. London: Stanley/Barker, 2021. ISBN 978-1-913288-31-0.

=== Books of work with others ===
- Delhi: Communities of Belonging. With Charan Singh. New Press, 2016. ISBN 978-1-62097-265-6.

=== Books edited by Gupta ===
- An Economy of Signs: contemporary Indian photographs. Arts Council England; Rivers Oram, 1990.
- Ecstatic Antibodies: resisting the AIDS mythology. Edited with Tessa Boffin. Arts Council England; Rivers Oram, 1990. ISBN 9781854890054. Photographs and text.
- Disrupted Borders: an intervention in definitions of boundaries. London: Arts Council England; Rivers Oram, 1993.

== Awards ==
- 2020 – Honorary Fellowship of the Royal Photographic Society, Bristol
- 2026 – Member of the Order of the British Empire (MBE)
- Honorary Fellow, Royal College of Art
- Honorary Doctorate, University of York

== Exhibitions ==
=== Solo exhibitions and exhibitions paired with others ===
Year	Title	Institution	Location	Notes	Ref
1994	Trespass 3	Contemporary Art Gallery	Vancouver		
2004	Homelands	UCR/California Museum of Photography, University of California, Riverside	California		
2005 - 2006	Sunil Gupta	Canadian Museum of Contemporary Photography	Ottawa		
2018	Dissent and Desire	Contemporary Arts Museum Houston	Houston, Texas	With Charan Singh	
2020 - 2021	From Here to Eternity: Sunil Gupta. A Retrospective	The Photographers' Gallery	London	Curated by Mark Sealy	

=== Exhibitions curated by Gupta ===
- Ecstatic Antibodies, Impressions Gallery, York, 1990; and toured to Chapter Arts Centre, Cardiff, 1990/1991; and elsewhere.

== Collections ==
Gupta's work is held in the following permanent collections:

- Museum of Modern Art, New York: 2 prints (as of October 2020)
- Philadelphia Museum of Art, Philadelphia, Pennsylvania
- Tate, UK: 18 prints (as of October 2020)
