= City Gallery (Leicester) =

Art gallery in Leicester, England

Coordinates: 52.6328°N 1.1284°W

City Gallery was a contemporary art gallery in Leicester, England. It closed 9 January 2010.

The gallery exhibited arts and crafts including international work but also local work reflecting the city's cultural diversity. The gallery had links with local schools and colleges holding events and workshops for young people.
