= Rita Keegan =

American-British artist and archivist (born 1949)

- Born: Rita Morrison; 1949 (age 76–77); New York, New York, U.S.
- Education: High School of Art and Design, San Francisco Art Institute
- Occupations: Artist, lecturer and archivist
- Known for: Painting, digital art

Rita Keegan, OBE (born 1949) is an American-born artist, lecturer and archivist, based in England since the late 1970s. She is a multi-media artist whose work uses video and digital technologies. Keegan is best known for her involvement with in the UK's Black Arts Movement in the 1980s and her work documenting artists of colour in Britain.

== Biography ==
Born Rita Morrison in the Bronx, New York City, to a Dominican mother and Canadian father, she described her upbringing in the Bronx as having "more in common with an English/Commonwealth background". She graduated from the High School of Art and Design focusing on illustration and costume design, then obtained a fine arts degree at the San Francisco Art Institute, where her teachers included the photographer Imogen Cunningham and the African-American artist Mary O'Neill. Keegan moved to London, England, in the late 1970s.

Keegan originally trained as a painter but in the 1980s begin to incorporate lens-based media, using the photocopier and computer in both 2D and installation work. In 1984 she worked at "Community Copyart" in London. The GLC-funded organisation was an affordable resource centre for voluntary groups to create they own print material in addition to working with artists who wanted to use the photocopier as a form of printmaking.

Keegan was a founding member of the artists' collectives Brixton Art Gallery in 1982, and later Women's Work and Black Women in View. She went on to co-curate Mirror Reflecting Darkly, Brixton Art Gallery's first exhibition by the Black Women Artists collective. From 1985, Keegan was a staff member at the Women Artists Slide Library (WASL), where she established and managed the Women Artists of Colour Index. She was Director of the African and Asian Visual Arts Archive from 1992 to 1994. In 2021, she had a solo exhibition titled Somewhere Between There and Here at the South London Gallery

Keegan taught New Media and Digital Diversity at Goldsmiths, University of London, where she also helped establish the digital-media undergraduate course in the Historical and Cultural Studies department.

== Selected exhibitions ==
- 1983: Women's Work, Brixton Art Gallery, London
- 1985: Mirror Reflecting Darkly: Black Women's Art, Brixton Art Gallery, London
- 1990: Let the Canvas Come to Life with Dark Faces, Bluecoat
- 1991: Family Album: An exhibition by Brixton Black Women Artists, Copyart Resource Centre, London
- 1991: Four X 4 curated by Eddie Chambers, Wolverhampton Art Gallery, Wolverhampton
- 1992: Trophies of Empire, Arnolfini Gallery, Bristol and Bluecoat, Liverpool curated by Keith Piper
- 1992: White Noise: Artists Working with Sound, Ikon Gallery, Birmingham
- 1993: Rites of Passage, ICA, London (solo)
- 1995: Time Machine: Ancient Egypt and Contemporary Art, InIVA and British Museum, London
- 1997: Transforming the Crown: African, Asian and Caribbean Artists in Britain, 1966–1996, Studio Museum in Harlem, Bronx Museum of the Arts, and Caribbean Cultural Center (Manhattan), New York
- 1998: Family Histories: Eating with Our Memories, Sleeping with the Ancestors, 198 Gallery, London (solo)
- 2006: Transformations, Lewisham Arthouse and Horniman Museum, London (solo)
- 2021: Somewhere Between There and Here solo exhibition at the South London Gallery
