= Tony Phillips (British artist) =

British artist and printmaker (born 1952)

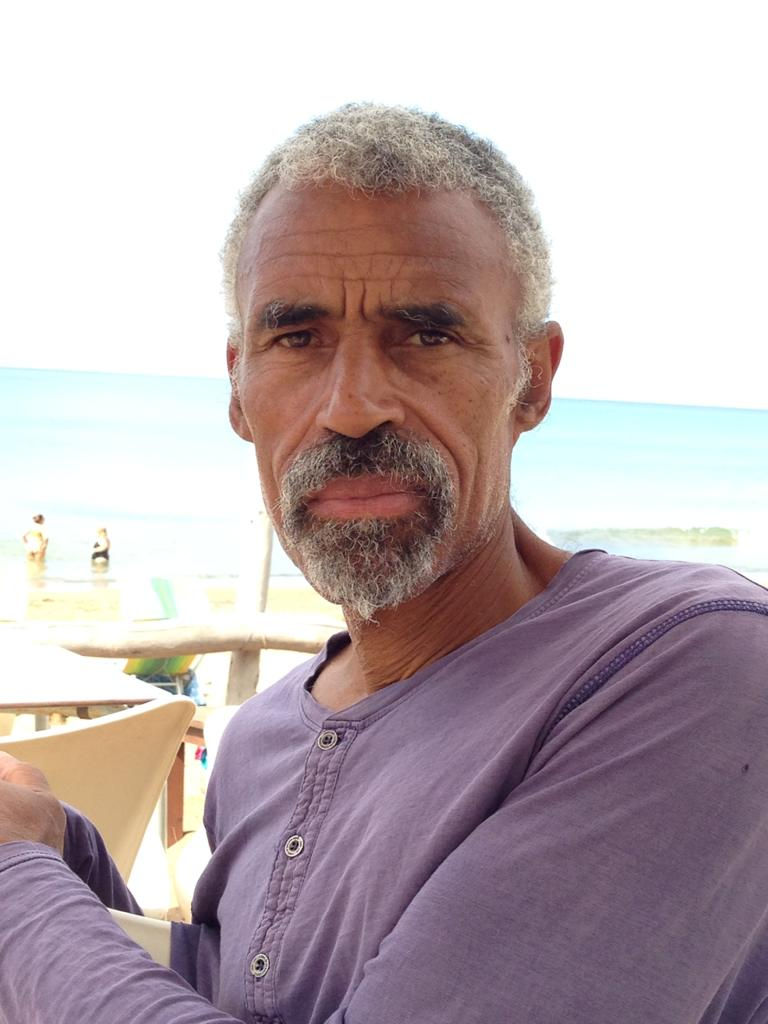
- Born: 1952 (age 73–74); Liverpool, England
- Education: University of Central Lancashire
- Occupations: Artist and printmaker

Tony Phillips (born 1952) is a British artist and printmaker.

== Early life and education ==
Phillips was born in Liverpool, England, in 1952 to an English mother and a Nigerian father. Phillips studied Mural Design at art college in Preston, graduating in 1972. In 1978, he moved to near Shrewsbury, Shropshire, and has subsequently moved to Italy.

== Paintings ==
Phillips' style is figurative and explores history, the built environment and peoples' ways of life. He has used a number of media including oils, pastels and etchings.

His work is held by UK galleries including the University of Liverpool, Wolverhampton Art Gallery, Abbot Hall Art Gallery and Shire Hall Gallery, as well as the collections of the Victoria and Albert Museum and the Art Council. He has also exhibited internationally.

History of the Benin Bronzes (mid-1980s) are among his best known works. They are a series of nine pastel drawings inspired by the British Punitive Expedition to Benin in 1897. The drawings place the bronzes within their social and cultural context. They illustrate twelve events in the capture of the bronzes and their subsequent removal to western museums (such as the British Museum) and show the tension between views of a culture and its artefacts.

Liverpool (1995) is an oil painting where the composition is full of history and socioeconomic themes. The central image is of a massive carved stone lion towering over a child to represent the power of the British empire over its subjects. This is surrounded by depictions of houses and buildings of Liverpool in various states of repair indicating both history and future. The lower third of the painting shows a section of the Liverpool docks walls, source of the city's wealth but also of suffering by slaves, dock workers, emigrants and immigrants.

Liverpool – Growth of a City (2003) is one of his series of etchings using a single plate that is re-worked to produce a series of different images, which is printed as an edition at each stage. The later prints show some of the layers from the earlier versions that can be considered faint, ghostly background. This series of prints shows a back alley in Liverpool 8 and how it changes from the 1890s to the 1980s. The city develops in the background as the ally itself becomes increasingly derelict.

== Exhibitions ==
- Phillips has exhibited a number of times at the Bluecoat Chambers: the group exhibition Black Art: Plotting the Course (1989), the etching series, Jazz in 1993 and a solo show The City (1994).
- In 1991, he was among the seven painters curated by Eddie Chambers in the History and Identity - Seven Painters exhibition at the Norwich Gallery, Norfolk Institute of Art and Design.
- In 1991, his work was included in the Shocks to the System national touring exhibition curated by the UK Arts Council.
- In 1997, his work was shown in the Transforming the Crown: African, Asian and Caribbean Artists in Britain 1966 - 1996 exhibition at the Caribbean Cultural Center, New York.
- A retrospective of his work from the 1970s onwards was shown in 2006 within the Liverpool Biennial of contemporary art. The works were placed within exhibition space in Senate House at the University of Liverpool.
- The Victoria Gallery and Museum, Liverpool, showed Shrine to the 20th century in 2013 that was produced during his "Man, Machine and the 20th Century" residency.
- The Victoria and Albert Museum exhibition in 2013, In Black and White: Prints from Africa and the Diaspora, included some of his prints from their collection.
- In 2016, his work was shown in Artist and Empire at Tate Britain, London.
