= Pitika Ntuli =

South African sculptor, poet, writer and academic (born 1942)

- Born: 1942 (age 83–84); Springs, Gauteng, South Africa
- Education: Pratt Institute
- Occupations: Sculptor, poet, writer and academic
- Spouse: Antoinette Ntuli
- Website: Official website

Pitika Ntuli (born February 18, 1942) is a South African sculptor, poet, writer, and academic. His work explores African spirituality, identity, and the legacy of colonialism through a multidisciplinary practice that blends art, language, and activism. Ntuli spent over three decades in political exile during apartheid, living in Eswatini and the United Kingdom before returning to South Africa in the early 1990s.

== Biography ==
Born in Springs, Gauteng, and raised in Witbank, Mpumalanga, Pitika Ntuli became politically active in the struggle against apartheid, which led to his arrest and eventual exile. From 1963, he lived in Eswatini where on April 7, 1978, he was arrested under Section 6 of the Terrorism Act and detained as a political prisoner. He spent a year in solitary confinement in a death row cell at Matsapha Central Prison before international pressure on both the South African and Eswatini authorities secured his release, after which he relocated to the United Kingdom. After his release, Ntuli pursued studies in New York City at the Pratt Institute, earning a Master of Fine Arts degree, and later a Master of Arts degree in Comparative Industrial Relations and Industrial Sociology from Brunel University in London. After completing these studies, he returned to England and began a career teaching at educational institutions, notably the Camberwell College of Art, Central Saint Martins College of Art and Design, the London College of Printing, Middlesex University, and the University of East London. In 1994, following South Africa’s democratic transition, Ntuli returned home and began lecturing in Fine Arts at the University of the Witwatersrand and the University of KwaZulu-Natal. He later served as Deputy Vice-Chancellor at the University of Durban-Westville until 2003.

== Art and exhibitions ==
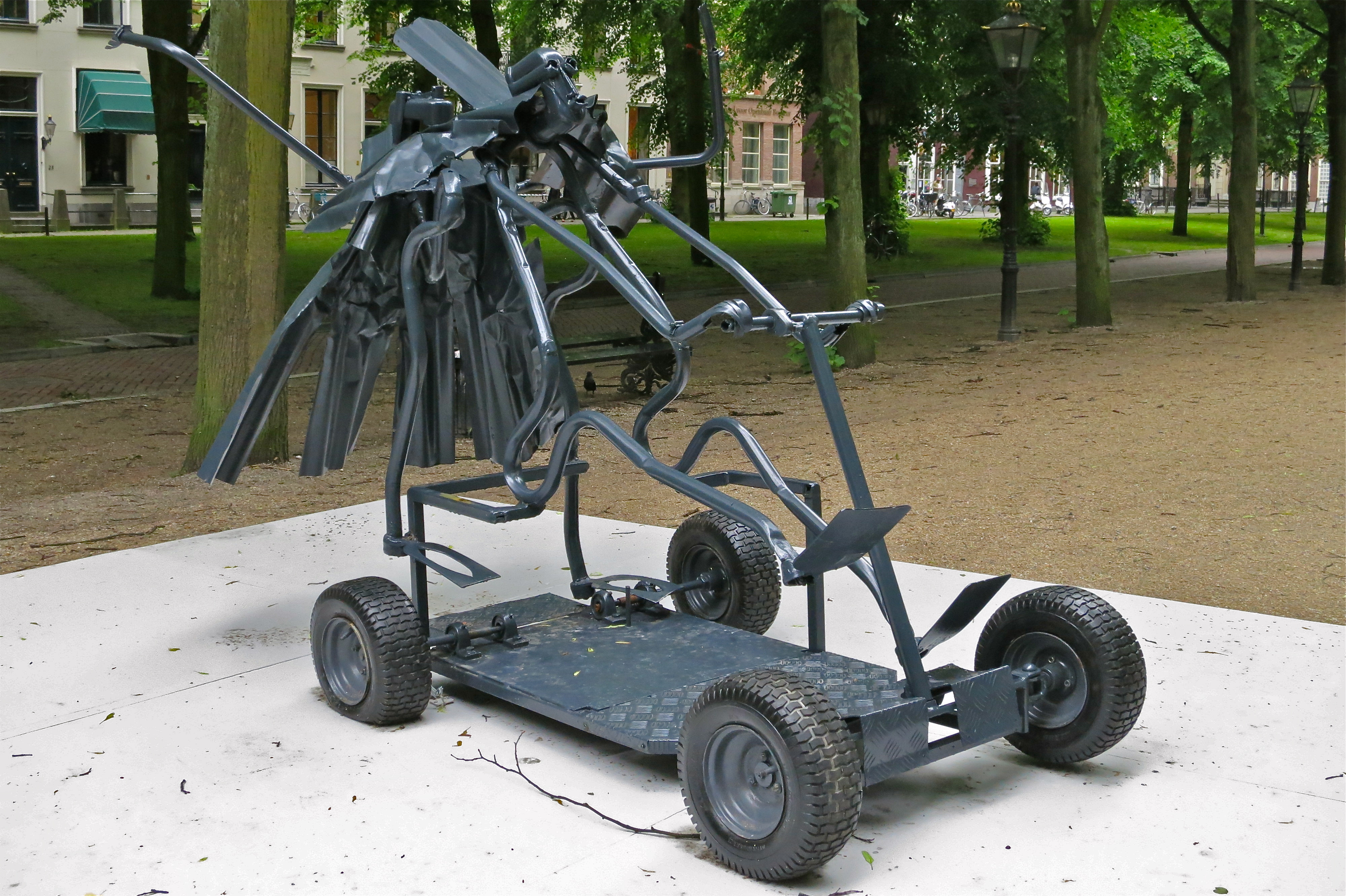
The Rainbow Nation by Ntuli in The Hague

Ntuli has held numerous solo and group exhibitions across Europe, the United States, and the United Kingdom, where he also organised several international art and cultural events. His sculptures are held in private collections worldwide, including those of Paul Simon, Phuthuma Nhleko, and Edward and Irene Akufo-Addo. Public sculptures by Ntuli can be found in institutions such as the Swaziland National Bank, St. Mary’s Catholic Church in Lobamba, COSATU House in Johannesburg, and Dieploof in Soweto.

Despite his international presence, Ntuli did not exhibit in South Africa until 2010, more than a decade after returning from exile. His first South African exhibition, held at Museum Africa, Johannesburg, was accompanied by the publication The Scent of Invisible Footprints: The Sculpture of Pitika Ntuli by the University of South Africa (UNISA). Subsequent exhibitions included showings at the Durban Art Gallery and the UNISA Gallery in Pretoria in 2011, as well as at Constitutional Hill, Melrose Arch, and the Oliver Tambo Cultural Centre in Ekurhuleni.

An expert on African indigenous knowledge systems, Ntuli is recognised as a political and cultural commentator and a frequent guest on the South African Broadcasting Corporation (SABC). He is also a published poet and has performed his work at numerous forums. Ntuli has contributed to national and provincial task teams and ministerial advisory committees. He served as a judge for the Sunday Times Literary Awards in 2009 and chaired the 2010 task team that advised the South African Minister of Arts and Culture on cultural programmes associated with the 2010 FIFA World Cup, including the opening and closing ceremonies.

== Activism and Art Initiatives ==
Ntuli has collaborated with a number of organisations, including Amnesty International. He has also been involved with Index on Censorship, a magazine dedicated to freedom of expression and promoting artistic and political dialogue. He played a key role in founding several arts initiatives. These include Apples & Snakes, one of Europe’s leading poetry circuits based in London, and Jenako Arts, a multidisciplinary arts centre that promoted the arts and cultures of Africa, Asia, and the Caribbean.

In 2013, he received a Lifetime Achievement Award for Visual Art from the Arts and Culture Trust and Vodacom Foundation. In 2020, his exhibition Azibuyele Emasisweni (Return to the Source) comprised works sculpted solely from bone, presented online during the COVID-19 pandemic. The exhibition won a Global Fine Art people’s choice award, and was subsequently shown at the Oliewenhuis Art Museum in 2022 and the Durban Art Gallery in March 2023. In 2024 he was awarded an Honorary Doctorate in Language Practice by Tshwane University of Technology.
