= Errol Lloyd =

Jamaican British artist, writer, arts administrator (born 1943)

- Born: 1943 (age 82–83); Lucea, Colony of Jamaica, British Empire
- Education: Munro College; Council of Legal Education
- Occupations: Painter, sculptor, writer, art critic, arts administrator
- Spouse: Joan Ann Maynard (m. 1977)

Errol Lloyd (born 1943) is a Jamaican-born painter, sculptor, writer, art critic, editor and arts administrator. Since the 1960s he has been based in London, to which he originally travelled to study law. Now well known as a book illustrator, he was runner-up for the Kate Greenaway Medal in 1973 for his work on My Brother Sean by Petronella Breinburg.

Having become involved with the Caribbean Artists Movement (CAM) in 1966, LLoyd went on to produce book jackets, greetings cards and other material for the London black-owned publishing companies, New Beacon Books, Bogle-L'Ouverture Publications, and Allison and Busby. Lloyd also had a long association with the Minorities' Arts Advisory Service (MAAS), whose magazine, Artrage, he edited for a while. He is recognised for having done much pioneering work for black art, beginning in the 1960s, when he was one of the few artists "who consciously chose to create Black images".

Eddie Chambers has written of him: "Gifted with an ability to capture likenesses in a range of creative and engaging ways, Lloyd has been responsible for a number of portrait commissions of leading Black and Caribbean males who have excelled in their respective fields over the course of the twentieth century", among them C. L. R. James, Sir Alexander Bustamante, Sir Garfield Sobers and Lord Pitt.

== Life and career ==
Born in Lucea, Jamaica, Errol Lloyd was schooled at Munro College in Saint Elizabeth Parish, where he excelled at sports and was an outstanding footballer (described in his schooldays in the early 1960s as being like "a Rolls Royce in a used car lot"). He travelled to Britain in 1963, aged 20, to study at the Council of Legal Education with the intention of becoming a lawyer, but that ambition was superseded by his interest in art (he did not complete his legal studies until 1974), although he undertook no formal training in that field. He has said: "I was self-taught and worked in isolation until I was introduced to [the] Caribbean Artists Movement. [...] I met older artists like the sculptor Ron Moody and they acted like role models for me. From there my work developed."

In 1967, Lloyd sculpted a bust of C. L. R. James and, having joined the Caribbean Artists Movement (CAM), took part in CAM's art exhibition at the University of Kent. While still a student, Lloyd began to receive commissions to make bronze busts; his subjects have included the Jamaican prime minister Sir Alexander Bustamante, politician Lord Pitt, cricketer Sir Garfield Sobers, and cultural figures including John La Rose, Linton Kwesi Johnson and others.

Lloyd regularly provided artwork for books published by Bogle-L'Ouverture and New Beacon Books, as well as having his paintings featured on greetings cards. In 1969, he was responsible for the cover of Bogle-L'Ouverture's first title, Walter Rodney's The Groundings with my Brothers, as well as their next title and others over the years. In 1971 he designed the cover for Bernard Coard's How the West Indian Child is Made Educationally Sub-Normal in the British School System, published by New Beacon. In addition Lloyd worked for mainstream publishers such as Random House, Penguin Books and Oxford University Press. His success as an illustrator began with the children's book My Brother Sean by Petronella Breinburg (Bodley Head, 1973), for which he was Highly Commended for the Kate Greenaway Medal; My Brother Sean was the first picture book by a mainstream UK publisher to feature black children aimed at the UK market. Other accolades followed during his career, including when his 1995 novel for teenagers, Many Rivers to Cross, won the Youth Library Group award and was nominated for a Carnegie Medal.

Alongside creating his own work, Lloyd has demonstrated a consistent concern for the general advancement of Black visual arts in Britain, promoting, supporting and celebrating other artists including such notables as Ronald Moody and Aubrey Williams. Lloyd was artist-in-residence at the Keskidee Centre from its early days and was involved with some of the productions staged there by such playwrights as Rufus Collins. He also had a long association with the Minorities' Arts Advisory Service (MAAS), which aimed "to promote ethnic identity and preserve cultural traditions", in the course of which he did service as an editor of the MAAS journal Artrage (published from 1980 for some 15 years). He was a member of an initiative set up in 1978 called the Rainbow Art Group, which mounted several exhibitions.

He was formerly a teacher for Advanced Painting at the Camden Arts Centre, and also served on the Visual Arts Panel for Arts Council England. He is also known as a musician, playwright and storyteller.

He is the subject of a photograph in the National Portrait Gallery, London, by Horace Ové. Lloyd also features in Ové's film about John La Rose, Dream to Change the World.

In 2012, Lloyd gave the keynote address on "Arts and Activism, Culture and Resistance" at the Annual Huntley Conference at London Metropolitan Archives.

In 2016, Lloyd was inducted into the Munro College Old Boys Association Hall of Fame.

=== Personal life ===
In 1977, Lloyd married actress Joan Ann Maynard.

== Exhibitions ==
Errol Lloyd has over the years participated in many significant exhibitions in the UK. In 1997, he featured in Transforming the Crown: African, Asian and Caribbean Artists in Britain, 1966–1996 — a historical exhibition in three New York City venues: the Studio Museum in Harlem, the Bronx Museum of the Arts and the Caribbean Cultural Center – representing the Caribbean Artists Movement along with Winston Branch, Althea McNish, Aubrey Williams and Ronald Moody.

More recently, his work was shown in the major exhibition No Colour Bar: Black British Art in Action 1960–1990, at the Guildhall Art Gallery (10 July 2015 – 24 January 2016), as part of which he was in conversation with Eddie Chambers on 13 July 2015, discussing "the impact made by notable Black Artists in the late 20th Century, who have gone largely unnoticed in the British Art Arena".

Celebrating Lloyd's career and his contributions to the visual and literary culture in Black Britain, Rianna Jade Parker curated the retrospective Errol Lloyd. A Life In Colour, which opened in November 2022 at 198 Contemporary Arts and Learning.

=== Selected exhibitions ===
- Caribbean Artists in England. Commonwealth Institute, London, 22 January–14 February 1971.
- Afro-Caribbean Art. Artists Market, London, 27 April–25 May 1978. Group exhibition organised by Drum Arts Centre.
- Errol Lloyd (solo exhibition of paintings), Kingston (Jamaica). Jamaican High Commission. 19 May–19 June 1978.
- Creation for Liberation: 2nd Open Exhibition By Black Artists. Brixton Art Gallery, London, 17 July–8 August 1984.
- Creation for Liberation. Third Annual Creation for Liberation Open Exhibition: Art by Black Artists. GLC Brixton Recreation Centre, London, 1985.
- Caribbean Expressions in Britain. Leicestershire Museum and Art Gallery, Leicester, UK. 16 August–28 September 1986.
- Black Art: Plotting the Course. Touring exhibition, 1988.
- Caribbean Connection. Islington Arts Factory, London, 15 September–13 October 1995.
- Caribbean Connection 2: Island Pulse. Islington Arts Factory, London, 1996.
- Transforming the Crown: African, Asian & Caribbean Artists in Britain, 1966–1996. Caribbean Cultural Center, Studio Museum in Harlem, and Bronx Museum of the Arts, New York City, 1997.
- No Colour Bar: Black British Art in Action 1960–1990. Guildhall Art Gallery, City of London, 10 July 2015 – 24 January 2016.
- Errol Lloyd. A Life In Colour. 198 Contemporary Arts and Learning, London, 26 November 2022 – 4 February 2023.
