= Lesley Sanderson =

Malaysian British artist

- Born: 1962 (age 63–64); Malaysia
- Education: Sheffield Polytechnic
- Known for: Explorations of dual-heritage identity through art, particularly self-portraits.
- Style: Mixed media, oil pastel, acrylic and oil painting
- Movement: Contemporary feminist art

Lesley Sanderson (born 1962) is a Malaysian British artist. Her work typically focuses on explorations of her duel-heritage identity and its relationship with art. Sanderson's work has been displayed in exhibitions internationally.

== Life and career ==
Lesley Sanderson was born in Malaysia in 1962, to a Malaysian mother and British father. She graduated from Sheffield Polytechnic with a BA in Fine Art in 1984. She now teaches at the University.

Sanderson's early works explored her own identity and mixed heritage using self portraits. They often offered a commentary on the depiction and fetishization of 'exotic' women in art. On this topic, Sanderson said: '“I think it’s particularly important that non-white women are represented in a way that provides an alternative to National Geographic-type media representations of ‘ethnic’ women being exotic, submissive and readily available for the gaze.”' In her work she attempts to break away from such traditions and re-establish her identity on her own terms. For her portraits Sanderson typically used oil pastel on paper or acrylic and oil on canvas.

In 1988, she participated in an exhibition titled Along the Lines of Resistance: an exhibition of contemporary feminist art, at the Cooper Gallery, Barnsley. In this exhibition Sanderson states that she uses the self-portrait to address racist and gender stereotypes. Her work also appeared in the 1988 exhibition Black Art: Plotting the Course.

Sanderson's work for the exhibition Four x 4 reframed George Fredrick Watts' bust Clytie displayed at the Harris Museum in Preston. Sanderson's interpreted Clytie as an 'emphatic symbol' in her objectification. In response she created a series of self-portraits to be displayed alongside the bust.

Sanderson's work was exhibited at The British Art Show 1990 as well as New North at Tate Liverpool.

In the 1990s, Sanderson's focus shifted from works on canvas to mixed media forms while maintaining her signature themes of identity and her duel heritage. Since 1998, she has been collaborating with Neil Conroy as Conroy Sanderson. Their work aims to re-interpret understandings of cultural identity.

Sanderson's work was featured in the book Shades of Black: Assembling Black Arts in 1980s Britain.

== Exhibitions ==
=== Selected group exhibitions ===
- Black Art: Plotting the Course, The Bluecoat Gallery, Liverpool, Wolverhampton Art Gallery, Oldham Art Gallery (1988)
- Along the Lines of Resistance: an exhibition of contemporary feminist art, Cooper Gallery, Barnsley (1988)
- The British Art Show 1990, Leeds Art Gallery, McLellen Galleries, Glasgow, Hayward Gallery, London (1990)
- New North, Tate Liverpool (1990)
- Four X 4, Wolverhampton Art Gallery, Arnolfini City Gallery Leicester, Harris Museum and Art Gallery, Castle Museum, Nottingham (1991)
- History and Identity Lincolnshire College of Art and Design (1991)
- Transforming the Crown, Studio Museum in Harlem, The Bronx Museum of The Arts, Caribbean Cultural Centre (1997–98)
