= Said Adrus =

Ugandan-British artist (born 1958)

- Born: 1958 (age 66–67); Kampala, Uganda
- Education: Nottingham Trent University
- Occupation: Artist
- Years active: 1985–present
- Known for: Multimedia art, mixed-media art

Said Adrus (born 1958) is an Ugandan-born British multidisciplinary artist. Adrus has lived in the UK, Switzerland, and other countries in Europe.

== Biography ==
Adrus was born to Gujarati Muslim parents in 1958 in Kampala, Uganda, in what was at the time known as British East Africa. His family were there through being part of the British colonial project of moving South Asian people to East Africa to build railways. They then moved to Switzerland, where they still live. Adrus then moved to Britain, due to Idi Amin expelling the descendants of Gujarati indentured labourers, many of whom moved to the UK.

Adrus has a BA(Hons) degree in Fine Art awarded by the Nottingham Trent Polytechnic. He is a polyglot, speaking German, French, Hindi, Gujarati and English.

During the 1980s, his imagery has been described as computer paintings on canvas. He later turned to mixed media and multi-media ways of working, experimenting with the moving image and screen projection. Since 2015, he has been combining his digital media work with various materials that allude to his voyage from African and Asian coastlines to the Western hemisphere, describing migration and emigration in the modern setting.

He references Andy Warhol as an influence to his collage work, comparing Warhol's parodying of Western art conventions to his pushing of the boundaries of painting while keeping its elements.

== Works ==
=== Group exhibitions ===
- 1985: Eastern Views: Works by Young Asian Artists from the Midlands
- 1985: Three Asian Artists
- 1988: Black Art: Plotting the Course
- 1988: Paintings by Said Adrus - Ceramics by Louise Block, Horizon Gallery, London.
- 1990: In Focus
- 1990: In Sight, in View
- 1990: "Let the Canvas Come to Life with Dark Faces"
- 1991: History and Identity: Seven Painters
- 1992: Black People and the British Flag
- 1992: Crossing Black Waters
- 1993: Transition of Riches
- 2008: Next We Change Earth
- 2011: Recreating the Archive

=== Reviews, articles, and texts ===
- 1990: "It Ain't Ethnic", Black Arts in London, no. 128,(1–30 September), 5.

=== Talks and events ===
- 2016: Straight Outta Gyri
