= Zarina Bhimji =

Ugandan Indian photographer (born 1963)

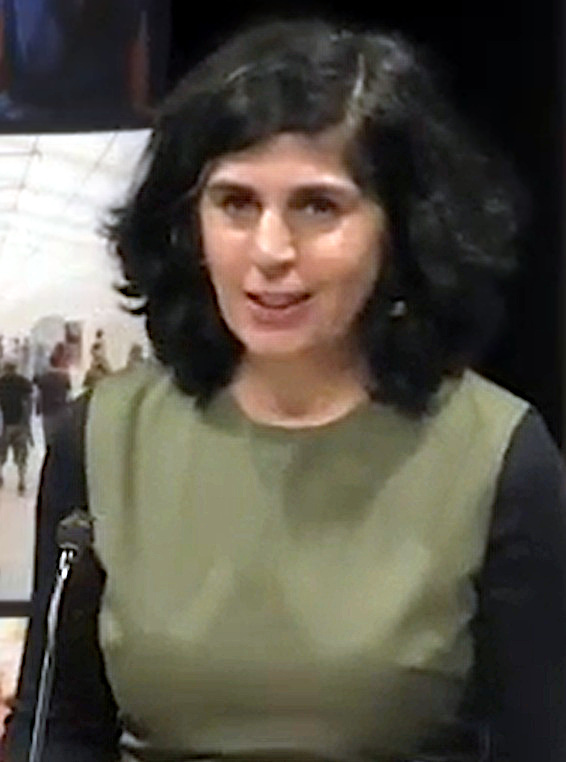
- Bhimji in 2019
- Born: 1963 (age 62–63); Mbarara, Uganda
- Education: Leicester Polytechnic (1982–1983); Goldsmiths' College (1983–1986); Slade School of Fine Art; University College London (1987–1989)
- Occupation: Photographer

Zarina Bhimji (born 1963) is a Ugandan Indian photographer, based in London, England. She was nominated for the Turner Prize in 2007, exhibited at Documenta 11 in 2002, and is represented in the public collections of Tate, the Museum of Contemporary Art in Chicago and Moderna Museet in Stockholm.

== Early life and education ==
Born in Mbarara, Uganda, Bhimji was educated at Leicester Polytechnic (1982–1983), Goldsmiths' College (1983–1986) and Slade School of Fine Art, University College London (1987–1989).

== Life and work ==
Her work appeared in Creative Camera in April 1990, and in Ten.8 magazine in 1992.

In 2001, Bhimji had her first solo exhibition in the U.S., Cleaning the Garden, at Talwar Gallery, New York. She participated in documenta 11 in June to September 2002 with her 16 mm film.

From 2003 to 2007, she travelled widely in India, East Africa and Zanzibar, studying legal documents and the stories of those who formed British power in those countries, carrying out interviews and taking photographs.

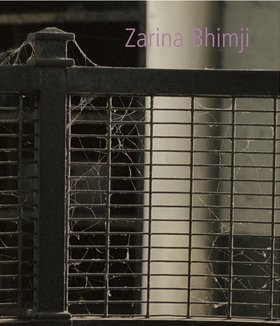
Zarina Bhimji book, published 2012.

In 2007, she was shortlisted for the Turner Prize for photographs of Uganda. Their theme was the expulsion of Asians from the country by Idi Amin and the subsequent loss and grief caused. The photographs were exhibited at Haunch of Venison gallery in London and Zurich. Her Turner Prize display included a film, Waiting, which was shot in a sisal-processing factory.

The Tate gallery describes her work:

Bhimji’s photographs capture human traces in landscape and architecture. Walls are a recurring motif, attracting her through their absorption of history as they become a record of those who built, lived within and ultimately abandoned them. Despite a conspicuous absence of the body, the photographs emit a human presence. Reference to it is sometimes explicit – a row of guns awaiting use in Illegal Sleep, yet sometimes only implied – the hanging, disconnected and electrical wires in my Burnt my heart ... Bhimji captures her sites with relentless formal concerns intended to convey qualities of universal human emotion and existence – grief, longing, love and hope. Concrete places become abstract sentiments as the physical rhythms of landscape and architecture become psychological.

In 2012, the first major survey exhibition of her work was held at Whitechapel Gallery, London, January–March 2012, which traced 25 years of her work. It opened with the joint premiere of her film, Yellow Patch (2011), at The New Art Gallery Walsall and the Whitechapel Gallery. The film was inspired by trade and migration across the Indian Ocean. An accompanying book was published by Ridinghouse.

Consisting of over 100 unframed photographs and multiple embroideries, Lead White is a meditation on power and beauty. It is the culmination of a decade-long investigation conducted over multiple continents, delving into national archives to capture details of words, lines, stamps and embossing. Bhimji creates poetic narratives by editing and repeating these details, as if constructing a musical composition, to explore what archives do, how they categorise and how they reveal institutional ideologies. The work also combines digital and physical crafts – including the use of embroidery for the first time in Bhimji's practice – drawing attention to textures and traces, light and shadow. Her latest work, Lead White has been commissioned by Sharjah Art Foundation.

Lead White was exhibited at Tate Britain in 2018/19.

== Awards ==
- 2001: Winner, EAST award at EASTinternational, selected by Mary Kelly and Peter Wollen
- 2003: International Center for Photography's, Infinity Award in the Art Photography category
- 2007: Shortlisted, Turner Prize for photographs of Uganda

== Collections ==
Bhimji's work is held in the following public collections:

- Tate
- Museum of Contemporary Art in Chicago
- Moderna Museet in Stockholm
