= Mark Sealy =

British curator and cultural historian (born 1960)

Mark Sealy OBE
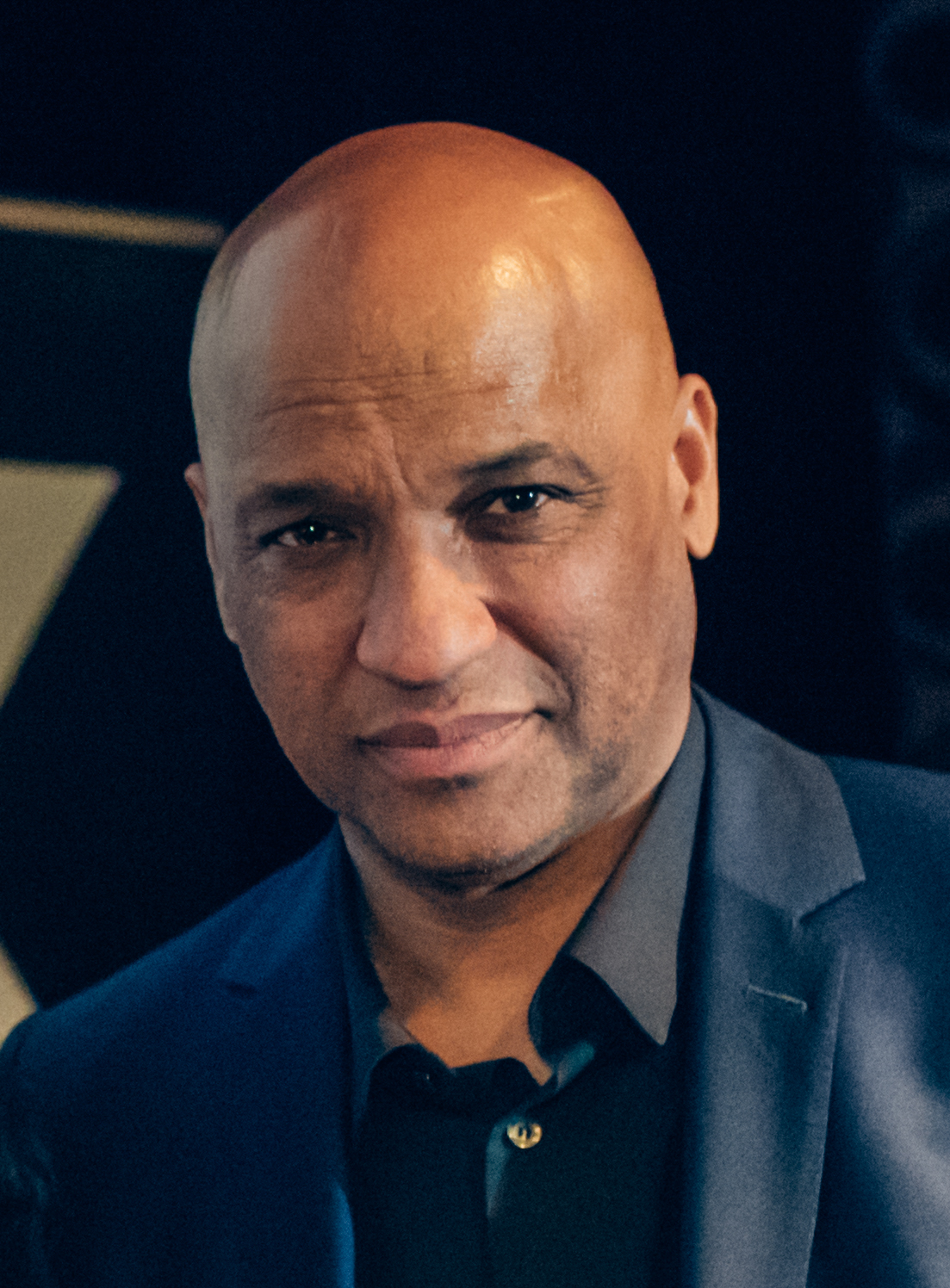
- Born: 1960 (age 65–66); Hackney, London, England
- Education: Goldsmiths, University of London
- Occupations: Curator and cultural historian
- Awards: Hood Medal (2005); Award for Outstanding Service to Photography (2019)

Mark Sealy OBE (born 1960) is a British curator and cultural historian with a special interest in the relationship of photography to social change, identity politics and human rights. In 1991, he became the director of Autograph ABP, the Association of Black Photographers, based since 2007 at Rivington Place, a purpose-built international visual arts centre in Shoreditch, London. He has curated several major international exhibitions and is also a lecturer.

== Biography ==
Born in 1960 in Hackney, London (to a father from Barbados and an English mother), and raised in Newcastle, Mark Sealy studied at Goldsmiths, University of London, after which he worked on national newspapers in Fleet Street.

As the Director of Autograph ABP (the Association of Black Photographers) since 1991, he has been responsible for initiating and delivering many exhibitions, residency projects and publications, as well as commissioning photographers and filmmakers. A recent commissioned project (2013–14) was The Unfinished Conversation, by award-winning documentary-maker John Akomfrah, a film-work on the political life of cultural theorist Stuart Hall.

Sealy has been a guest lecturer at the Royal College of Art and many other institutions in England and abroad, and has participated in many national and international conferences, including on the "Historical Perspectives on International Curatorial Debates of the 1980s and 1990s" panel at the Shades of Black conference, Duke University (Durham, North Carolina), in April 2001, the 2011 symposium on "post-racial imaginaries" held at the University of Westminster by the journal darkmatter, "Reframing the Moment: Legacies of the 1982 Blk Art Group" (curated by Sonia Boyce and Keith Piper) in 2012 at Wolverhampton Polytechnic, and has been on judging juries for such prestigious awards as the World Press Photo competition.

In 2007, the Royal Photographic Society awarded Sealy the Hood Medal for services to photography. In 2019, he was given the Award for Outstanding Service to Photography (and Honorary Fellowship), Royal Photographic Society.

His work as a curator includes an audiovisual programme for Rencontres d'Arles in 1993, and Human Rights Human Wrongs – an exhibition featuring images selected from the Black Star collection of 20th-century photojournalism – at the Ryerson Image Centre, Toronto (23 January–14 April 2013), and at the Photographers' Gallery, London (6 February–6 April 2015). Among many initiatives at Rivington Place, he co-curated with Renée Mussai (archivist and head of research at Autograph) the critically acclaimed Black Chronicles II, first shown in 2014, a solo retrospective of the work of Rotimi Fani-Kayode (1955–1989) marking the 25th anniversary of his death, and in 2015, researched and curated an exhibition to mark the 70th anniversary of the Fifth Pan-African Congress in 1945, featuring photographs by John Deakin exhibited for the first time. Sealy curated the 18th FotoFest Biennial (8 March–19 April 2020), Houston's city-wide annual photography festival, marking the first time that the event has focused its attention on the continent and its diaspora. 'The history of visual culture and making images is being investigated, torn apart, blown up in the air, and made new,' Sealy has explained, citing this exhibition as playing a part in this process.

Sealy completed a PhD at Durham University, where his research focused on photography and cultural violence. He previously earned a taught MA in Photographic Image from the same institution.

Sealy was appointed Member of the Order of the British Empire (MBE) in the 2013 New Year Honours for services to photography and Officer of the Order of the British Empire (OBE) in the 2022 New Year Honours for services to art.

== Publications ==
- Vanley Burke: a Retrospective. London: Lawrence & Wishart, 1993. Edited by Sealy. With a preface by Stuart Hall .
- Different: A Historical Context: Contemporary Photographers and Black Identity. Phaidon, 2001. With Stuart Hall. An examination of identity through photography.
- Rotimi Fani-Kayode & Alex Hirst – Photographs. London: Autograph, 1996. Co-edited by Sealy.
- Decolonising the Camera: Photography in Racial Time. London: Lawrence & Wishart, 2019. ISBN 978-1912064755.
- Photography: Race, Rights and Representation. London: Lawrence & Wishart, 2022. ISBN 9781913546335.
