= Eugene Palmer (artist) =

British artist (born 1955)

- Born: Eugene Oliver Palmer; 1955 (age 70–71); Kingston, Jamaica
- Education: Wimbledon School of Art; Garnett College; Goldsmiths College
- Occupation: Artist

Eugene Oliver Palmer (born 1955) is a Jamaican-born British artist. His work uses archival records, photographs, and contemporary media imagery as basis for his paintings. Palmer has had a long association with art curators and exhibitors Eddie Chambers and Keith Piper and is recognised as one of the leading Black artists working in Britain. He currently lives and works in St Leonards-on-Sea, East Sussex.

== Biography ==
Eugene Oliver Palmer was born in Kingston, Jamaica, and came to England as a child with his parents in 1966. Growing up, he was influenced by two different cultures and it is the memories of these and influences from them that have shaped his artistic career.

In the mid-1970s he completed an Art Foundation course in Sutton Coldfield, Birmingham, before going on to secure a BA (Hons) degree from Wimbledon School of Art in 1978, followed a few years later by a Teaching Certificate from Garnett College, London, and an MA in painting from Goldsmiths College, in the mid-1980s.

Starting with colourful and bright abstract paintings of the early to mid-1980s, Palmer began exploring a variety of different areas of painting as his career progressed. Common themes in his work are explorations of cultural history and cultural identity.

His early career encompassed exhibiting at such venues as Bedford Gill Gallery, 198 Gallery, and the Duncan Campbell Gallery, and group exhibitions included the New Contemporaries, Caribbean Expressions in Britain in the mid-1980s and Black Art: Plotting the Course.

== Solo exhibitions ==
- Artist of the Day, selected by Sonia Boyce MBE, Flowers Gallery, London, 2014
