= List of British Asian artists =

This is a list of British Asian artists, born in or associated with the UK, who are notable in visual arts as designers, painters, photographers and sculptors.

The Office for National Statistics uses the term "Asian, Scottish Asian or British Asian" to include British Indians, British Pakistanis, British Bangladeshis, British Chinese people and people of any other Asian ancestry.

The 1989 exhibition, The Other Story: Afro-Asian Artists in Post-War Britain, curated by Rasheed Araeen is recognised as a key exhibition in British Asian art history.

In 1963, The Indian Painters Collective UK was founded, before Indian Artists UK (IAUK) was established in 1976.

In 1988, the Panchayat Arts and Education Resource Unit (known as the Panchayat Collective) was founded to collect, archive, and promote art by Black and Asian artists in Britain.

Important collections of British Asian include the "South Asian Diaspora Arts Archive (SADAA)" held at Birmingham Museum, and the education group Sampad and research collective Chai Shai work to increase knowledge of British Asian art and artists.

== A ==
- Nilofar Akmut
- Shahidul Alam
- Rasheed Araeen (Note: Featured in the 1989 exhibition, The Other Story.)
- Saleem Arif (Note: Featured in the 1989 exhibition, The Other Story.)

== B ==
- Gajanan Baghwat (Note: Member of The Indian Painters Collective UK, founded in 1963)
- Zarina Bhimji
- Sutapa Biswas
- Chila Kumari Singh Burman
- Hammad Butt

== C ==
- Suki Chan
- Avinash Chandra (Note: Featured in the 1989 exhibition, The Other Story.)
- Gordon Cheung
- Gayle Chong Kwan

== D ==
- Shezad Dawood
- Poulomi Desai
- Mukul Dey
- Avtarjeet Dhanjal (Note: Featured in the 1989 exhibition, The Other Story.)

== E ==
- Nina Edge

== G ==
- Iqbal Geoffrey (Note: Featured in the 1989 exhibition, The Other Story.)
- Amal Ghosh

== H ==
- Lawrence Abu Hamdan

== K ==
- Anish Kapoor
- Jasleen Kaur
- Permindar Kaur
- Balraj Khanna (Note: Featured in the 1989 exhibition, The Other Story.) (Note: Founding member of IAUK.)
- Matthew Krishanu

== L ==
- Kwong Lee

== M ==
- Yashwant Mali (Note: Founding member of IAUK.)
- Reba Maybury
- Saiman Miah
- Haroon Mirza
- Prafulla Mohanti

== P ==
- Ahmed Parvez (Note: Featured in the 1989 exhibition, The Other Story.)
- Raksha Patel
- Ivan Peries (Note: Featured in the 1989 exhibition, The Other Story.)

== R ==
- Lancelot Ribeiro (Note: Member of The Indian Painters Collective UK, founded in 1963) (Note: Founding member of IAUK.)

== S ==
- Anwar Jalal Shemza (Note: Featured in the 1989 exhibition, The Other Story.)
- Gurmindar Sikand
- The Singh Twins
- F. N. Souza (Note: Featured in the 1989 exhibition, The Other Story.)

== T ==
- Shanti Thomas

== W ==
- Ibrahim Wagh (Note: Founding member of IAUK.)

== Y ==
- Osman Yousefzada

== See also ==
- British Asians
- South Asian Diaspora Arts Archive
- Chinese Arts Centre
