= The Essential Black Art =

Art exhibition

The Essential Black Art was a group contemporary art exhibition, and one of the largest survey shows of Black art, held at the Chisenhale Gallery in 1988 between 5 February and 5 March. Karachi-born and London-based conceptual artist Rasheed Araeen curated the group show, in collaboration with Black Umbrella, an Afro-Asian collective that promoted underrepresented or institutionally suppressed art. The exhibition was inspired by Araeen's experience as a Afro-Asian artist in London during the 1970s, as well as anti-colonial texts such as Frantz Fanon's The Wretched of the Earth. In total, the show contained the work of nine artists: Araeen, Zarina Bhimji, Sutapa Biswas, Sonia Boyce, Eddie Chambers, Alan de Souza, Mona Hatoum, Gavin Jantjes, and Keith Piper. The Essential Black Art traveled to five different galleries across London and was met with mixed reviews from art critics. It also provided a forestate of Araeem’s larger exhibition of the following year, The Other Story.

== Background and historical context ==
Rashad Araeen was the curator of the group exhibition, as well as a featured artist. He moved to London in 1964 after studying civil engineering in Karachi, Pakistan. Once in London, Araeen became drawn to the art scene and started to create symmetrical minimalist structures which challenged hierarchical views. By the early 1970s, Araeen had joined the British Black Panther Party as well as Artists for Democracy as he grew concerned with issues of racism and xenophobia in London, particularly the death of Nigerian immigrant David Oluwale. After this point, he began to read anti-colonial texts such as Frantz Fanon’s The Wretched of the Earth, and works from writers like Ho Chi Minh, Amilcar Cabral, and Paulo Freire, which informed his political art.

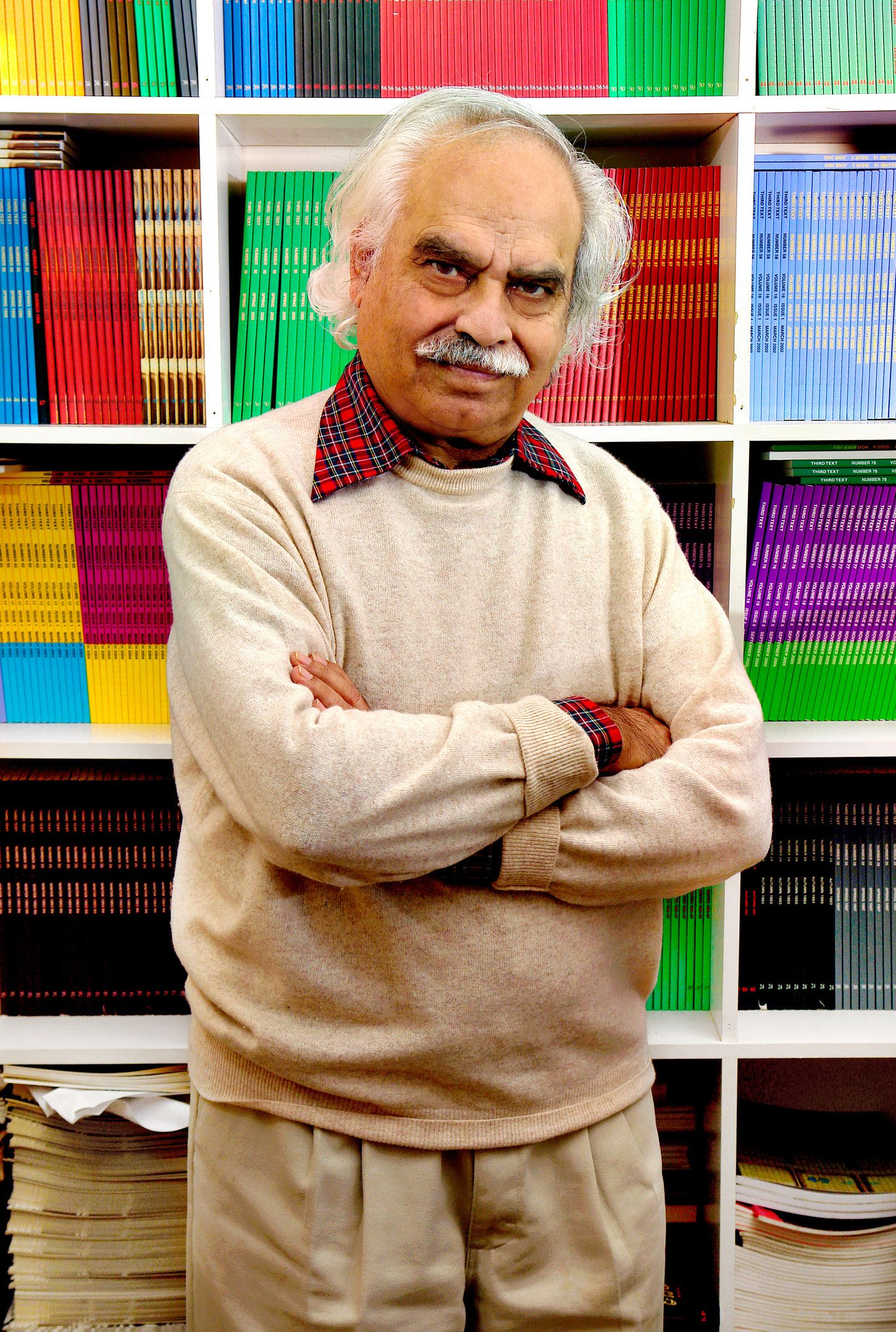
Rasheed Araeen photographed by Socrates Mitsios

Araeen developed an understanding between art and politics after galleries refused to exhibit his work. He realized that his, along with other black artists in London, identity was pre-determined in the art scene which not only limited his opportunities to have his work exhibited, but also restricted his ability to authentically represent himself. To Araeen, black was not a racial category, but rather a nationalist identifier which included those who were not seen as English or white. In 1975, he wrote the Black Manifesto which reflected on the role of art in the Third World. In the years that followed, he founded Black Phoenix (1978) and Third Text (1987), two theoretical art journals which called for a liberatory arts movement in London and focused on the connection between art and post-colonialism.

== Exhibition ==
The Essential Black Art opened on 5 February 1988 at the Chisenhale Gallery of East London, which was founded by artists in 1986 to serve as a space of artistic experimentation. This group exhibition brought together the works of nine artists: Rasheed Araeen, Zarina Bhimji, Sutapa Biswas, Sonia Boyce, Eddie Chambers, Alan de Souza, Mona Hatoum, Gavin Jantjes, and Keith Piper.

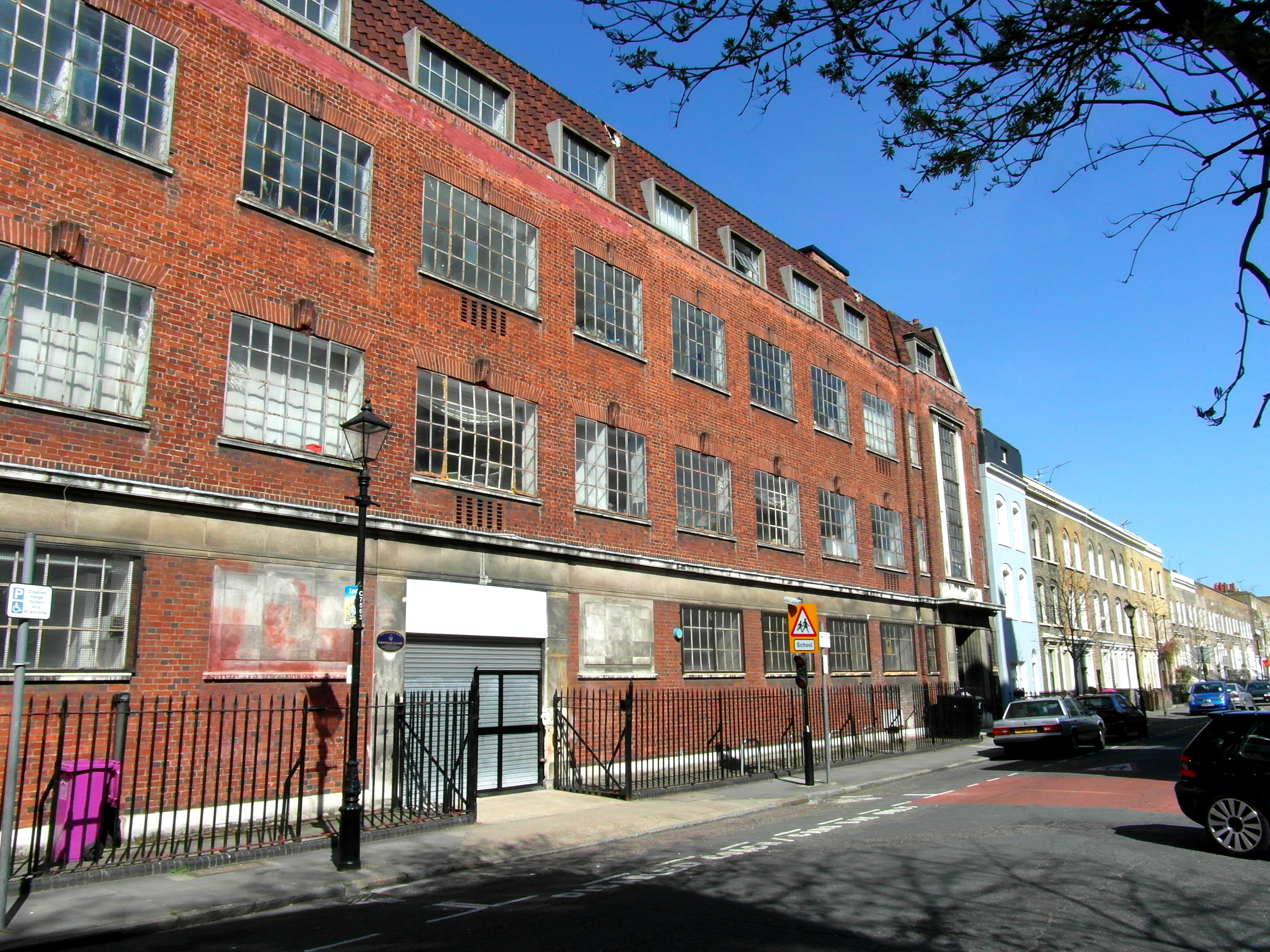
Chisenhale Gallery in London, United Kingdom

The objective of the show was to display the evolution of politically motivated art by Black and Asian artists living in London during the 1980s. Within Araeen’s political position and curatorial framework, Essential Black Art sought to critique the institutional racism that the artist experienced in his early years of living in London, as well as address the misuse of the term ‘Black art.’The exhibition catalogue contained several essays, including a paper which Araeen had given to the 1982 First National Black Art Convention. Araeen argued against identifying 'Black Art' as "whatever is produced by black artists", or seeing it as exemplifying "Asian/African traditions". Rather, Black Art was a "specific contemporary art practice that has emerged directly from the struggle of Asian, African and the Caribbean people (i.e. black people) against racism".

== Reception ==
The exhibition was met with mixed reviews. Visual arts editor for Time Out Magazine and art critic Sarah Kent referred to the exhibition, which began with works in the 1970s to establish historical continuity, as an impressive show that drew on mutually supportive relationships between artists. The review went on to commend Araeen for curating an exhibition that portrayed the explicit progression of the Black Arts Movement in London, which many of the artists contributed to.

Adeola Solanke, a British-Nigerian playwright and screenwriter, wrote a review of The Essential Black Art in Art Monthly and described the group show as "unrefreshing" but striking for a London-based audience. Solanke went further to suggest that Rashed Araeen’s outlook on Black art, as something that is intrinsically tied to a struggle against racism, was "thoughtless" and "unproductive."

While it is unclear how many visitors viewed the exhibition, The Essential Black Art was able to travel to five different galleries across England: Laing Art Gallery, Huddersfield Art Gallery, Herbert Art Gallery, Gardner Art Centre, and Cooper Gallery. It also inspired Araeen’s larger exhibition, The Other Story, displayed the following year.
