= Into the Open =

Into the Open, subtitled "New Paintings, Prints and Sculptures by Contemporary Black Artists", was an exhibition of art by black artists displayed at various venues in the United Kingdom in 1984.

This exhibition was the first major survey by a municipal gallery of contemporary work by black artists in Britain, and is considered one of the landmark exhibitions of the 1980s. It was curated, at the invitation of Sheffield City Arts Department, by two people closely involved with black artists in Britain: Pogus Caesar and Lubaina Himid. Their stated aim was to give an indication of the range and richness of art made by contemporary Afro Caribbean artists.

The Into the Open exhibition toured in the United Kingdom in 1984, appearing at three venues: the Mappin Art Gallery in Sheffield (4 August–9 September 1984), the Castle Museum in Nottingham (16 September–21 October 1984), and the Newcastle Media Workshops in Newcastle-upon-Tyne (2–24 November 1984). It was organized by the Sheffield Arts Department and was subsidised by the Arts Council of Great Britain.

== Artists in the exhibition ==
- Clement Bedeau
- Sylbert Bolton
- Sonia Boyce
- Pogus Caesar
- Eddie A. Chambers
- Shakka Dedi
- Uzo Egonu
- Lubaina Himid
- Gavin Jantjes
- Claudette Johnson
- Tom Joseph
- Juginder Lamba
- Bill Ming
- Ossie Murray
- Houria Niati
- Benjamin Nhlanhla Nsusha
- Pitika P. Ntuli
- Keith Piper
- Richie Riley
- Veronica Ryan
- Jorge Santos
