= BLK Art Group =

English artists group

The BLK Art Group was the name chosen in 1982 by a group of five influential conceptual artists, painters, sculptors and installation artists based in England. Keith Piper, Marlene Smith, Eddie Chambers and Donald Rodney were initially based in the Midlands.

The group were all from the British African-Caribbean community and exhibited in a number of group exhibitions in both small and prestigious galleries throughout the country. Their work was noted for its boldly political stance, producing dynamic conceptual art that offered a series of inventive critiques on the state of inter-communal, class and gender relations in the UK. They were themselves influenced by a variety of artistic currents including ideas associated with the USA's Black Arts Movement. Donald Rodney, who suffered from sickle cell anaemia (anemia), died aged 36 in 1998.

== Precursors ==
In 1979, Eddie Chambers founded a group known as the Wolverhampton Young Black Artists.

In 1981, Chambers curated an exhibition, Black Art & Done, at the Wolverhampton Art Gallery, which gave a focus to issues concerning the black community, including racial prejudice. Participating artists included Dominic Dawes, Ian Palmer, Andrew Hazel and Keith Piper.

== Institutional impact and legacy ==
The group exhibited from 1982 to 1983 in The Pan-Afrikan Connection, touring to Ikon Gallery, Birmingham, Trent Polytechnic in Nottingham; King Street Gallery in Bristol; and the Africa Centre in London and The `Herbert Gallery in Coventry. In 1983–84, the touring exhibition The BLK Art Group was held at the Herbert Art Gallery in Coventry, Battersea Arts Centre and again the Africa Centre. In 1988, Eddie Chambers curated the exhibition Black Art: Plotting the Course.

The group's critique of the institutional racism of Britain's art world was part of the impetus that led to The Other Story, a seminal survey of African and Asian artists curated by Rasheed Araeen at London's Hayward Gallery in 1989, as well as the founding of the Association of Black Photographers and the establishment of Iniva, the Institute of International Visual Art. Piper and Chambers themselves have both gone on to achieve veteran status as educators, writers and curators.

In 2011, the Blk Art Group Research Project was set up by Keith Piper, Claudette Johnson and Marlene Smith.

== Critical appraisal ==
Eddie Chambers has argued that despite their undoubted creativity and social relevance, the group suffered from the general lack of serious critical attention given to black artists by the British arts media. Nevertheless, their enthusiasm and commitment to making art relevant to everyday life ensured that they were a strong influence on the later generation of black British artists that included Young British Artists (YBA) such as Chris Ofili and Steve McQueen, both of whom went on to win Turner Prizes, while maintaining a clear political element to their work.

== Other artists associated with the BLK Art Group ==
- Faisal Abdu'allah - consequent
- David A. Bailey - contemporary
- Sonia Boyce - contemporary
- Denzil Forrester - contemporary
- Godfried Donkor - consequent
- Lubaina Himid - contemporary
- Claudette Johnson - contemporary
- Tam Joseph - forerunner/contemporary
- Virginia Nimarkoh - contemporary
- Pitika Ntuli - forerunner/contemporary
- Eugene Palmer - contemporary
- Mark Sealy - contemporary
- Maud Sulter (1960–2008) - contemporary
- Fowokan - contemporary

== See also ==
- Caribbean Artists' Movement
