= Panchayat Arts and Education Resource Unit =

Panchayat Collective
- Founded: 1983
- Defunct: 2003
- Location: Old Spitalfields Market (until 1997); University of Westminster (1997-2015); Tate Britain (2015-present)

Membership
- Founder(s): Shaheen Merali and Al-An deSouza

The Panchayat Arts and Education Resource Unit (also known as the Panchayat Collective) was an artist collective, education group, and archive founded in London in 1988 by Shaheen Merali and Al-An deSouza in collaboration with Bhajan Hunjan, Symrath Patti and Shanti Thomas. ‘Panchayat’ is a name for a council of village elders on the Indian Subcontinent.

The group dedicated themselves to collecting, archiving, and promoting art by Black, Asian, and first nations artists in Britain from the 1970s-1990s. They worked to close a gap in collecting practices by the major British art institutions, in which artists of colour were under-represented. The group joined other activist efforts by Black and Asian artists working at that time to promote their art, including the BLK Art Group. The term 'Black' was used by the Panchayat Collective and other activists at the time to indicate "political blackness" to refer to "all the minority migrant communities without the careful discrimination of ethnic, racial, regional, national and religious distinctions which has since emerged", as a way to recognise shared struggles and build solidarity.

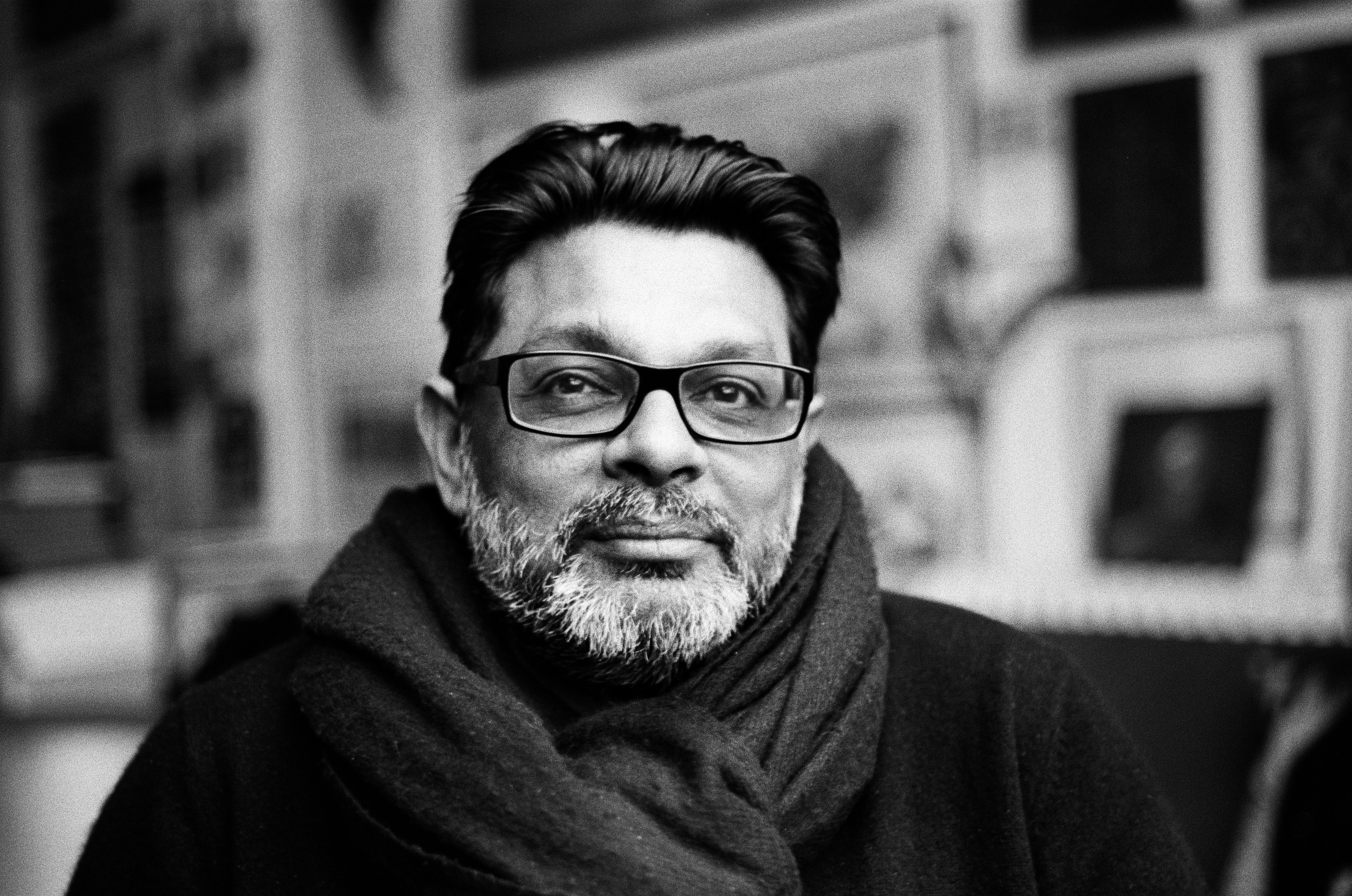
Shaheen Merali, one of the co-founders of the Panchayat Collective.

The group were originally based in Old Spitalfields Market. In 1997 the collection was deposited with the University of Westminster Library, and in 2015 the archive keepers, Shaheen Merali and Dr Janice Cheddie, donated the collection to Tate Library, where it is now accessible as the Panchayat Collection.

Co-Keeper of the Panchayat Collection Janice Cheddie described the collection as "a witness to artists embracing the new technologies of video, copy art and digital media to explore through a range of aesthetic devices the political and social formation of identities, imagination and artistic production, the policing of sexuality, and the emerging migration and refugee crises of the early 1990s."

== Panchayat Collection at the Tate Library ==
The Panchayat Collection is kept at the Tate Library. It includes "books, slides, exhibition publications, journals, photographs, videos and documentation" collected by the group between 1983 and 2023.

Organisations and artists represented in the archive as authors of ephemera include:

- Arts Council England
- Greater London Authority
- South London Gallery
- Southbank Centre
- Eddie Chambers
- Charles Esche
- Balraj Khanna

== See also ==
- List of Black British artists
- List of British Asian artists
- BLK Art Group
- The Caribbean Artists Movement
