= Faisal Abdu'Allah =

British artist and barber (born 1969)

- Born: Paul Duffus; 1969 (age 56–57); London, England, United Kingdom
- Education: Willesden High School; Harrow School of Art; Central St Martins; Royal College of Art
- Occupations: Artist and barber
- Known for: Painting, illustration

Faisal Abdu'Allah (born 1969 in London) is a British artist and barber. His work includes photography, screenprint and installations.

== Life and work ==
Abdu'Allah was born Paul Duffus in 1969 and grew up in a Pentecostal family. He was educated at Willesden High School, Harrow School of Art, Central St Martins and the Royal College of Art.

In 1991, Abdu'Allah converted to Islam and changed his name. The event was described in the BBC television documentary series The Day That Changed My Life, and formed the subject of the artist's 1992 work Thalatha Haqq (Three Truths). He taught at the University of East London (UEL), formerly North East London Polytechnic. He was a visiting professor at Stanford University and is a member of the Association of Black Photographers.

In the spring of 2013, Abdu'Allah was an artist-in-residence at the University of Wisconsin-Madison Arts Institute, and in the fall of 2014 he returned to Wisconsin, this time as an assistant professor in the Art Department of the School of Education. He is now an associate professor of art and in 2017, received one of UW–Madison's Romnes Faculty Fellowships.

In his work The Last Supper, eleven men and women sit in Islamic costume around a table, while a figure corresponding to Judas Iscariot stands, concealing a gun behind his back. Silent Witness featured portraits of young black men, with a soundtrack mixing rap, prayer and interviews.

== Group exhibitions ==
- 1993: Borderless Print. Rochdale Art Gallery, Rochdale. With Saleem Arif, Chris Ofili, Donald Rodney, and Maud Suiter.
- 1994: Us an' Dem. The Storey Institute, Lancaster. With Denzil Forrester, and Tam Joseph.
- 1995: Make Believe. Royal College of Art Galleries and other sites around London. In collaboration with Clive Allen.
- 1995: Revelations. Bonington Galleries, Nottingham. With Clive Allen.
- 1995: The Impossible Science of Being: Dialogues between Anthropology and Photography. The Photographers’ Gallery, London. With Zarina Bhimji, and Dave Lewis.
