= The Other Story (exhibition) =

The Other Story was an exhibition held from 29 November 1989 to 4 February 1990 at the Hayward Gallery in London. The exhibition brought together the art of "Asian, African and Caribbean artists in post war Britain", as indicated in the original title. It is celebrated as a landmark initiative for reflecting on the colonial legacy of Britain and for establishing the work of overlooked artists of African, Caribbean, and Asian ancestry. Curated by artist, writer, and editor Rasheed Araeen, The Other Story was a response to the "racism, inequality, and ignorance of other cultures" that was pervasive in the late-Thatcher Britain in the late 1980s. The legacy of the exhibition is significant in the museum field, as many of the artists are currently part of Tate's collections. The exhibition received more than 24,000 visitors and a version of the exhibition travelled to Wolverhampton Art Gallery, 10 March to 22 April 1990; and Manchester City Art Gallery and Cornerhouse, 5 May to 10 June 1990.

== Artists included ==
The exhibition included works by twenty-four artists, including Ahmed Parvez, Anwar Jalal Shemza, Aubrey Williams, Avinash Chandra, Avtarjeet Dhanjal, Balraj Khanna, David Medalla, Donald Locke, Eddie Chambers, Frank Bowling, Francis Newton Souza, Gavin Jantjes, Iqbal Geoffrey, Ivan Peries, Keith Piper, Kumiko Shimizu, Lubaina Himid, Mona Hatoum, Rasheed Araeen, Ronald Moody, Saleem Arif, Sonia Boyce, Uzo Egonu, Hassan Sharif and Li Yuan-Chia.

== Exhibition concept ==
In the exhibition catalogue, Hayward Gallery Director Joanna Drew writes that "Making an exhibition on the basis of racial origin is not something that comes easily to the art world". The exhibition was first proposed to but rejected by the Arts Council in 1978 for being "untimely". Some critics argue that The Other Story was made possible thanks to the growing grassroots activism related to the British Black Arts Movement, feminist critique, and anti-racist discourses in the UK, the US, and South Africa. The selection criteria of the exhibition focused on the relationship between modernism in African, Caribbean, and Asian artists who resided in the UK for at least ten years. Therefore, the show is considered an intervention into the "exclusive canon of Euro-American modernism".

In his introduction in the exhibition catalogue, Rasheed Araeen asks: "Can true pluralism be achieved without recovering what we have lost in the past, for whatever reasons? Can we afford to be complacent any more?"

The Other Story was divided into four thematic sections: "In the Citadel of Modernism", "Taking the Bull by the Horns", "Confronting the System", and "Recovering Cultural Metaphors".

Although Araeen used "Afro-Asian" in the exhibition catalogue and the wall texts to refer to the participating artists, the promotional banner used a different title: "The Other Story: Asian, African and Caribbean artists in post-war Britain." Cultural historian Lucy Steeds argues that this terminology disbands the solidarity and the "hyphenated connectivity in 'Afro-Asian'".

== Criticism ==
Rashid Araeen has been criticized for the gender imbalance in the exhibition. Only four of the twenty-four artists were women: Sonia Boyce, Mona Hatoum, Lubaina Himid, and Kumiko Shimizu. Araeen stated that he was not able to locate Black and Asian women artists from earlier generations. He added that several women artists refused his invitation after hesitating that the organizing principle of the exhibition could create "a ghettoising context".

In her exhibition review published in December 1989, Sutapa Biswas criticized the show for the lack of representation of black women artists. In response to Biswas, Araeen wrote that the question of equal representation of black women artists is related to the "nature of postwar Afro-Asian immigration" in the UK while calling her approach "phoney feminism".
