= Permindar Kaur =

English visual artist (born 1965)

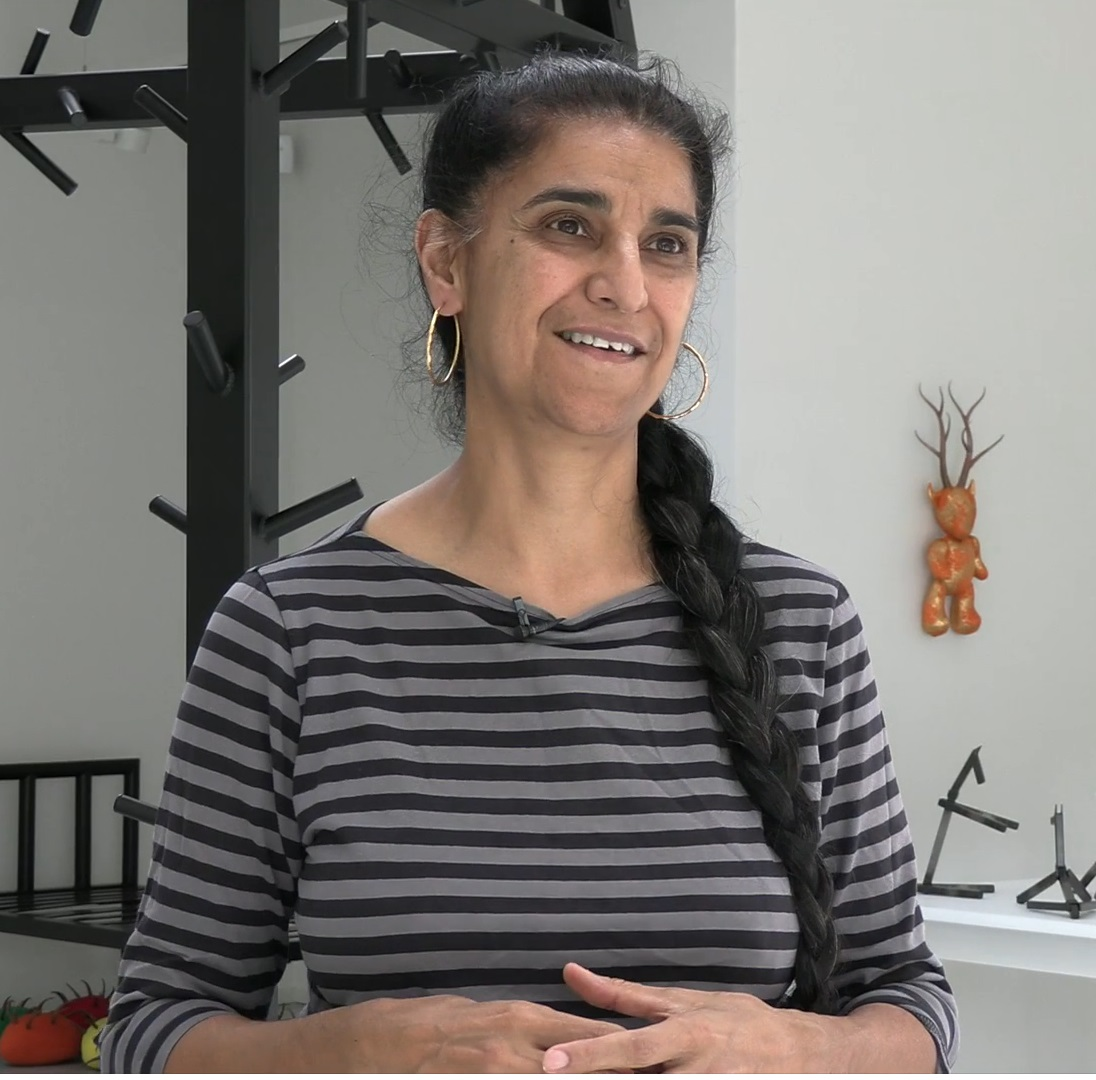
- Kaur at The Art House, Wakefield, September 2022
- Born: 1965 (age 60–61); Nottingham, England
- Education: Sheffield City Polytechnic, Glasgow School of Art
- Occupation: Visual artist
- Website: permindarkaur.com

Permindar Kaur (born 1965) is an English visual artist. She was included in the British Art Show in 1996. She was shortlisted for the Freelands Award 2022 for her exhibition at the John Hansard Gallery.

== Life and education ==
Kaur was born in Nottingham, England, to Punjabi parents. She gained a BA degree from Sheffield City Polytechnic in 1989, an MA from Glasgow School of Art in 1992 and spent several years in Barcelona in the early 1990s.

== Career and work ==
Kaur emerged to prominence during the 1990s. Her work is often concerned with themes surrounding the home, domestic life and childhood. The structure of the house itself frequently appears in her sculpture in works such as Overgrown House (2020). Items of domestic furniture such as beds and chairs also appear, often in outsized or distorted forms, resulting in an effect that is slightly "disconcerting" or "unnerving", as art historian Eddie Chambers has noted.

== Selected exhibitions ==
=== Solo ===
- Cold Comfort, shown in two parts at Ikon Gallery, Birmingham, and Mead Gallery, Coventry (18 May 1996 – 22 June 1996). Toured to the Bluecoat Gallery, Liverpool (27 July – 31 August 1996)
- Independent Thoughts: New work by Permindar Kaur, Nottingham Castle Museum and Art Gallery (27 March - 24 May 1998)
- Permindar Kaur: Outgrown, The Art House, Wakefield (3 September – 13 November 2022)

=== Group ===
- Let the Canvas Come to Life With Dark Faces, Herbert Art Gallery and Museum, Coventry (14 April – 29 May 1990), and touring.
- Four X 4, Arnolfini, Bristol (12 October – 24 November 1991)
- Invisible Cities, Fruitmarket Gallery, Edinburgh (8 – 22 February 1992)
- Tread Softly, Yorkshire Sculpture Park, Wakefield (27 May – 15 October 2017)
- Animals & Us, Turner Contemporary, Margate (25 May – 30 September 2018)
- What Lies Beneath: Women, Politics, Textiles, New Hall Art Collection, Cambridge (17 February – 28 August 2022)
- Permindar Kaur, Ranya Abdulateef and Ifa Mesfin Abebe: Dream Runner, Wakefield Cathedral (28 September – 13 November 2022)

== Collections ==
Permindar Kaur's work is part of the following collections:

- Arts Council, England
- British Council, UK
- New Art Hall Collection, Cambridge
- Cartwright Hall, Bradford
- Nottingham Castle Museum, Nottingham
