= The Expedition in Pursuit of Rare Meats =

1927 mural by Rex Whistler

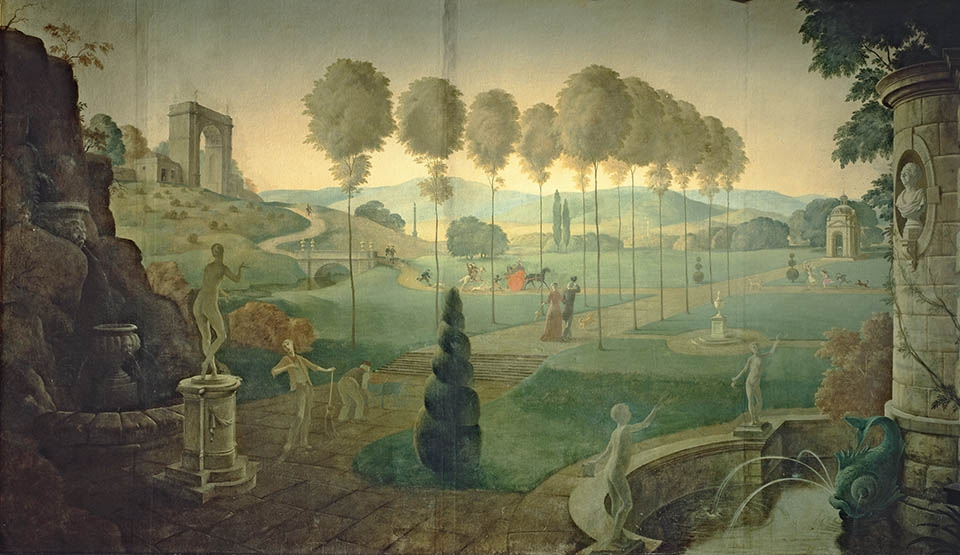
- Detail of the mural
- Artist: Rex Whistler
- Year: 1927
- Type: Mural
- Location: Tate Britain; London

The Expedition in Pursuit of Rare Meats is a mural by the English artist Rex Whistler (1905–1944), commissioned in 1926 and completed in 1927 at the Tate Gallery (now Tate Britain) in London. The mural was commissioned by the gallery's inaugural director, Charles Aitken, for the re-opening of its restaurant, where it forms the entire interior surround of what was the eponymously named eatery, "The Rex Whistler Restaurant".

Concerns about the racist themes in the mural were first raised with The Tate following the restoration in 2013. In one scene, the artist depicts a black child who is chained to and being dragged behind a horse and cart and, in another scene, the artist's depiction of Chinese people is considered stereotypical by some because the figures are "caricatured". The entire painting, and its background story, can also be read as a satire on imperialism ("Rare Meats" being a culinary term for lightly cooked meat, while the painting goes to extremes to find food that is "rare" in the sense of being difficult to find). The room displaying the mural closed as a restaurant in 2020. After a public campaign demanding The Tate acknowledge and address the racist depictions in the mural, the restaurant closed permanently, reopening the room in 2024 including the site-specific commission by British artist Keith Piper to reframe the mural for contemporary audiences.

== History ==
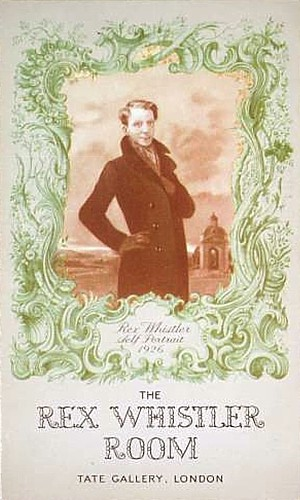
A 1927 pamphlet for Rex Whistler Room at the Tate Gallery

The mural was commissioned in 1926 and completed in 1927. Aitken had hoped that the high profile of the mural's commission would induce large restaurateurs like J. Lyons and Co. to fund murals in their establishments. It was funded by Joseph Duveen, who had previously funded the mosaics created by Boris Anrep for the entrance to the Tate in 1921. Duveen had suggested the creation of a refreshment room at the Tate in 1925, and had offered £500 (equivalent to £26,282 in 2025) towards its decoration with a mural. Rex Whistler was recommended for the job by Henry Tonks, who was part of the committee that chose the artist for the mural. Whistler was chosen for the project in 1926 while he was still a student at the Slade School of Art. Another member of the committee, Philip Sassoon, had favoured the artist Glyn Jones, and proposed a competition for the mural's design among alumni of the British School at Rome.

Whistler was paid £5 a day (equivalent to £264 in 2025) over the 18 months it took to complete the work, and given a £100 bonus upon the work's completion (equivalent to £5,432 in 2025). His assistant, Nan West, was paid £3 per day. West's role was to mix colours and prepare Whistler's designs to be transferred to the large canvas. The mural was submerged during the flooding of the River Thames in January 1928 but was undamaged. The Expedition in Pursuit of Rare Meats was included in the Tate's 1939 exhibition Mural Painting in Great Britain, 1919 to 1939, which ran from May to June 1939.

The mural was restored in 2013 as part of a £45 million refurbishment of Tate Britain. After the restoration, the restaurant re-opened as The Rex Whistler Restaurant in November 2013, serving a menu inspired by traditional British cuisine. In 2020 the restaurant closed because of the COVID-19 pandemic, during the closure there was a petition demanding that The Tate remove the mural and acknowledge the content as "racist and harmful". In December 2020, the trustees of The Tate acknowledged that the mural was "unequivocally... offensive", announced that the future of the mural was under review by the ethics committee, and commissioned a consultation on the mural and its presentation. In February 2022, the trustees announced that they would commission a site-specific installation" to reframe the mural for contemporary audiences. Keith Piper received the first commission, opening Viva Voce, a two-channel video installation in the room formerly used as a restaurant in March 2024.

== Design ==
The action depicted in the mural takes place in the fictive land of "Epicurania" ruled over by the "Duke of Epicurania". The content of the mural was created in a collaboration between Whistler and the novelist Edith Olivier. The story articulated in the work depicts an account wherein an "expedition" of a group of seven people departs in search of exotic meats. They travel on all manner of transport‍—‌bicycles, carts and horses‍—‌from their point of departure the "Duchy of Epicurania", and venture through bizarre and enchanting lands while coming upon creatures such as unicorns, truffle dogs and two giant gluttons guarding the entrance to a cave. The tale finishes with the adventurers arriving back to an ebullient welcome, and the menu of the Epicuranians, which had previously consisted of dry biscuits, is forever changed." Several notable British buildings are depicted in the mural including the bridge at Wilton Park and an arch and pavilion in the grounds of Stowe House. Henry Tonks is portrayed in a bust that looks out from a grotto in the mural.

The mural depicts the "enslavement of a black child and the distress of his mother" and later shows the child "running behind a horse and cart which he is attached to by a chain around his neck". The depicted figures are a few inches high, and would have been conspicuous to only a few diners.

== Reception ==
When the restaurant opened in 1927 with the mural completed, Henry Tonks, a professor the Slade School of Fine Art who had recommended the artist, described it as "the most amusing room in Europe". This phrase was also used in the Tate's publicity when the restaurant reopened after the restoration in 2013. The mural is described as "one of the outstanding mural schemes of the Inter-War years" in Tate Britain's heritage listing in 1970 on the National Heritage List for England. Concerns about the racist themes in the mural were raised with The Tate in 2013, following the restoration and again in 2018.

Writing in Apollo magazine in 2014, Digby Warde-Aldam remarked that "[l]ooking at the mural now is a strange experience; while its subject matter and frivolously gallant style are almost unutterably camp, there's a sombre sobriety to the tones of the paint that renders it an impressive work rather than the sort of kitsch and ephemerally fashionable diorama churned out by some of his contemporaries".

=== 2020 petition and review ===
In July 2020, The White Pube, a duo of art critics, began a campaign against the mural on Instagram. A Change.org petition by the duo read: "The fundamental point of a high class restaurant (used primarily by an older white demographic) being installed with art of this horrific nature is not being acknowledged as the harmful and hateful issue it is" and that The Expedition in Pursuit of Rare Meats "sounds more like a concept for a horror film than what you would expect Britain's largest art institution to offer up as an exclusive dining experience...Tate Britain allowing this overtly racist painting to remain for diners' enjoyment is not acceptable". The Tate stated in response: "it is important to acknowledge the presence of offensive and unacceptable content and its relationship to racist and imperialist attitudes in the 1920s and today". The work was reviewed by an ethics committee which reported to the board of the Tate galleries in September 2020. The committee was headed by the Canadian postal executive Moya Greene. The committee reported that they were "unequivocal in their view that the imagery of the work is offensive" and that the offence was "compounded by the use of the room as a restaurant"; however, they stated that the work "should not be altered or removed" and that it is in the care of the Tate's trustees. The mural is part of the fabric of the Grade II* listed building and so cannot be easily resited. The room displaying the mural was closed as a restaurant in 2020.

In August 2020 following a public campaign, The Tate removed a description from its website that had described the restaurant as "the most amusing room in Europe" and wrote that "Whistler's treatment of non-white figures reduces them to stereotypes" and that the gallery was "working to become a space that is more relevant, welcoming and inclusive for everyone". In a September 2020, trustees acknowledged that "previous contextualisation of the imagery has not been adequate."

Martin Bailey wrote in The Art Newspaper that "Tate now faces a dilemma. As an art gallery, it can hardly cover the offending figures with a screen and it has a responsibility to allow public access to a work by an important early 20th-century British painter". The future visibility of the room will have to be determined, either by appointment or on a limited or permanent basis to visitors. A permanent security presence will also be required. The notoriety of the mural is also likely to attract many future visitors and thus increase the visibility of the offensive depictions. Bailey wrote that by "drawing attention to the two black children and the Chinese figures the overwhelming number of visitors will go to see the mural simply because of the controversy. They will focus on the offensive passages rather than engage with it as a work of art—and many more people are likely to view the inappropriate figures than a few years ago".

=== 2024 reopening the Rex Whistler Room with site-specific commissions ===
In February 2022 The Tate announced that the former restaurant would reopen to the public as a display space containing, alongside Whistler's work, "interpretive material" and a site-specific art installation to "critically engage" with the piece. In March 2024, The Rex Whistler Commission: Keith Piper: Viva Voce by British artist Keith Piper became the first commission to "reframe" the mural.

== See also ==
- List of changes made due to the George Floyd protests § Museums and other displays
