= John Lyons (poet) =

Trinidadian poet, artist and educator (born 1933)

- Born: October 1933 (age 92); Port-of-Spain, Trinidad
- Education: Goldsmiths' College, School of Art; University of Newcastle-upon-Tyne
- Occupations: Artist, poet, educator, curator
- Website: www.jcmlyons.co.uk

John Lyons (born October 1933) is a Trinidad-born poet, painter, illustrator, educator and curator. He has worked as a theatre designer, exhibition adviser and as a teacher both of visual art and creative writing. As an art critic, he has written essays for catalogues, notably for Denzil Forrester's major touring exhibition Dub Transition, for Jouvert Print Exhibition and Tony Phillips' Jazz and The Twentieth Century.

Public collections that hold artwork by John Lyons include Rochdale Art Gallery, Huddersfield Art Gallery, the Victoria and Albert Museum's Word & Image Print Collection and the Arts Council National Collection.

His collections of poetry have been described both as being focused on "describing the texture of the Caribbean landscape and the vividness of its peoples" and contributing "to the enrichment of the West Indian British voice".

== Biography ==
John Lyons was born in Port of Spain, Trinidad. His mother died when he was nine years old, and he and his three siblings moved to live with their grandmother in rural Tobago. He returned to Trinidad in 1948 to live with his father and stepmother.

He eventually moved to London, England, and from 1959 to 1964 studied at Goldsmiths' College, School of Art, graduating with a National Diploma of Design, after which he gained an Art Teachers' Diploma at the University of Newcastle-upon-Tyne (1965–65) to teach art as a specialist subject. While studying without a grant, he supported himself through part-time jobs that included being an early morning factory cleaner, evening waiter, postman and shift-work hospital porter.

=== Teaching ===
His first job was at South Shields Grammar Technical School for Boys, and in 1967 he moved to Manchester, where he worked in secondary schools for nine years, before becoming an Art and Design Lecturer in South Trafford College. While teaching there for 17 years, he continued painting and writing. He was a part-time creative writing lecturer at the then Bolton Institute of Higher Education (now the University of Bolton), between 1991 and 1998, and has been an Arvon Foundation tutor at various times since 1991.

=== Painting ===
Lyons has been exhibiting his paintings since the 1960s, and describes his approach to picture making by saying: "I enter into a playful dialogue with the work in which line, shape, texture and vibrant colour are brought together to inhabit a theme usually based on Caribbean folklore and mythology." He was a participant in the recent exhibition No Colour Bar: Black British Art in Action 1960–1990 at the Guildhall Art Gallery (10 July 2015 to 24 January 2016), which took inspiration from the radical lives of Guyanese activists Eric and Jessica Huntley and the publishing company they founded, Bogle-L'Ouverture.

=== Writing ===
Lyons' first book, Lure of the Cascadura was published by Bogle-L'Ouverture Publications in 1989, since when his writing has appeared in many publications, including anthologies for children, and several full collections of poetry. His recent book for younger readers, Dancing in the Rain (2015), illustrated by the author himself, was shortlisted for the 2016 Centre for Literacy in Primary Poetry Award (CliPPA), the only award for published poetry for children. Described by the judges as "a breath of fresh air", the collection draws inspiration from Lyons' childhood in Trinidad and Tobago, drawing inspiration from the traditions of Carnival and calypso.

Also an accomplished cook, he combined recipes, verse and illustrations in Cook-up in a Trini Kitchen (Peepal Tree Press, 2009), "a highly original cookbook that can be read in the way you’d read a collection of short stories. It’s peppered with anecdotes, and the colourful illustrations are a joy to behold. Lyons describes the book as an 'explosion' of his three passions [art, poetry and food]."

As a poet, Lyons has read his work widely, appearing at festivals within the UK and abroad, and has made a number of broadcasts on radio and television, as well as featuring in audio archives. He has participated in many conferences and workshops, nationally and internationally, and over the years has received won many honours and accolades, including in 2003 the Windrush Arts Achiever Award.

Among several essays he has written for exhibition catalogues, he contributed a much quoted text, "Denzil Forrester's Art in Context" to accompany the 1990–91 Denzil Forrester exhibition Dub Transition: A Decade of Paintings 1980 – 1990.

=== Community work ===
John Lyons co-founded (with writer Jean Rees, to whom he is married) and was a trustee of the Hebden Bridge community arts charity Hourglass Educational Arts Development Services (HEADS), 2000–2010, for which he ran weekly art classes at the Hourglass Studio Gallery as resident artist.

== Selected exhibitions ==
Solo

- 1990: Salford Museum and Art Gallery.
- 1991: Castle Museum, Nottingham.
- 1992–94: Behind The Carnival; a major touring exhibition, Huddersfield Art Gallery.
- 1994: Galway Arts Centre, Republic of Ireland.
- 1997: Mythopoeia, a major touring exhibition from Wrexham Art Centre.
- 1998: Daydreaming, Lawrence Batley Gallery, West Bretton.
- 1999: Ovation, Rochdale Art Gallery.
- 2000: Theatr Ardudwy, Harlech
- 2002: In the Terrain of the Psyche, Hourglass Studio Gallery, Hebden Bridge.
- 2005: 3Cups Gallery, Ely, Cambridgeshire.
- 2006: Diorama Art Centre Gallery, London.
- 2009: Chimera, Needhams Restaurant and Art Gallery.
- 2010: Selected Mini Retrospective from 1964 to 1984, Williams Art Cambridge.
- 2013: Mythlore, The Apex Gallery, Bury St Edmunds.
- 2015: John Lyons, Hot Numbers, Cambridge.
- 2024: John Lyons: Carnivalesque, The Whitworth, Manchester.

Mixed / group

- 1979: Galerie du Musee des Duncans, Paris.
- 1982: Edison Galerie, The Hague, Netherlands.
- 1982: The Hayward Annual, Southbank Centre, London.
- 1986: Caribbean Expressions in Britain, Leicester Art Gallery.
- 1988: Black Art: Plotting The Course. Arts Council-sponsored touring exhibition.
- 1989: Jouvert Print Exhibition. The Paddington Print Project, a major touring exhibition.
- 1990: Let The Canvas Come To Life With Dark Faces, Arts Council sponsored touring exhibition.
- 1995: Vibrant Energies, (with Tang Lin), Chinese Art Centre. Manchester
- 1995: Caribbean Connections, Islington Art Factory, London.
- 1998: Evocation: Hourglass Studio Gallery.
- 2007: Upper Gallery, Home Affairs, Cambridge Open Studios Artists.
- 2009: Hills Road Exhibition, Cambridge.
- 2009: Ovenden Contemporary Art Group Exhibition, The Old Palace, Ely.
- 2009: Ever After The Honey, Clare Hall, Cambridge University.
- 2010: Art To Die For, CAM at Williams Art Cambridge.
- 2013: Blue Contemporary, Cambridge City Art Fair.
- 2010: Atelier Contemporary, Cambridge City Art Fair.
- 2015: Spirit of Carnival, Upper Gallery, The Plough, Shepreth.
- 2015: No Colour Bar: Black British Art in Action 1960–1990, Guildhall Art Gallery, City of London.

== Selected bibliography ==
Poetry

- 1989: Lure of the Cascadura, Bogle-L'Ouverture Publications. ISBN 978-0-904521-48-1
- 1991: The Sun Rises in the North, Smith/Doorstop Books. ISBN 978-1-869961-32-9
- 1994: Behind the Carnival, Smith/Doorstop Books. ISBN 978-1-869961-54-1
- 2002: Voices from a Silk-Cotton Tree, Smith/Doorstop Books. ISBN 978-1-902382-41-8
- 2009: No Apples in Eden, Smith/Doorstop Books. ISBN 978-1-902382-99-9
- 2009: Cook-up in a Trini Kitchen (poems and Caribbean recipes), Peepal Tree Press. ISBN 978-1-84523-082-1
- 2015: A Carib Being in Cymru, Smith/Doorstop Books. ISBN 978-1-902382-99-9
- 2015: Dancing in the Rain (poems for younger readers), Peepal Tree Press. ISBN 978-1-84523-301-3

== Awards and accolades ==
- 1987: Highly commended, Peterloo Poets Poetry Competition for "Skin, Skin Is Me, Yuh Na Know Meh"
- 1987: Commended, National Poetry Competition for "Ham Bone and Tidal Waves"
- 1987: Peterloo Poets Afro-Caribbean, Asian Poetry Prize
- 1987: Second prize, Cultureword Poetry Competition
- 1988: Equal second prize (shared with Jackie Kay), Peterloo Afro-Caribbean, Asian Poetry Prize
- 1991: Arts Council Literary Award (for Lure of the Cascadura)
- 1991: Peterloo Poets Afro-Caribbean, Asian Poetry Prize
- 2003: Windrush Arts Achiever Award
- 2016: Dancing in the Rain shortlisted for CLPE children's poetry award (CliPPA)

== Illustrations to publications ==
John Lyons Carnivalesque (2024), The Whitworth, ISBN 978-0-903261-82-1
