= Denzil Forrester =

Grenadian/British artist (born 1956)

Denzil Forrester MBE
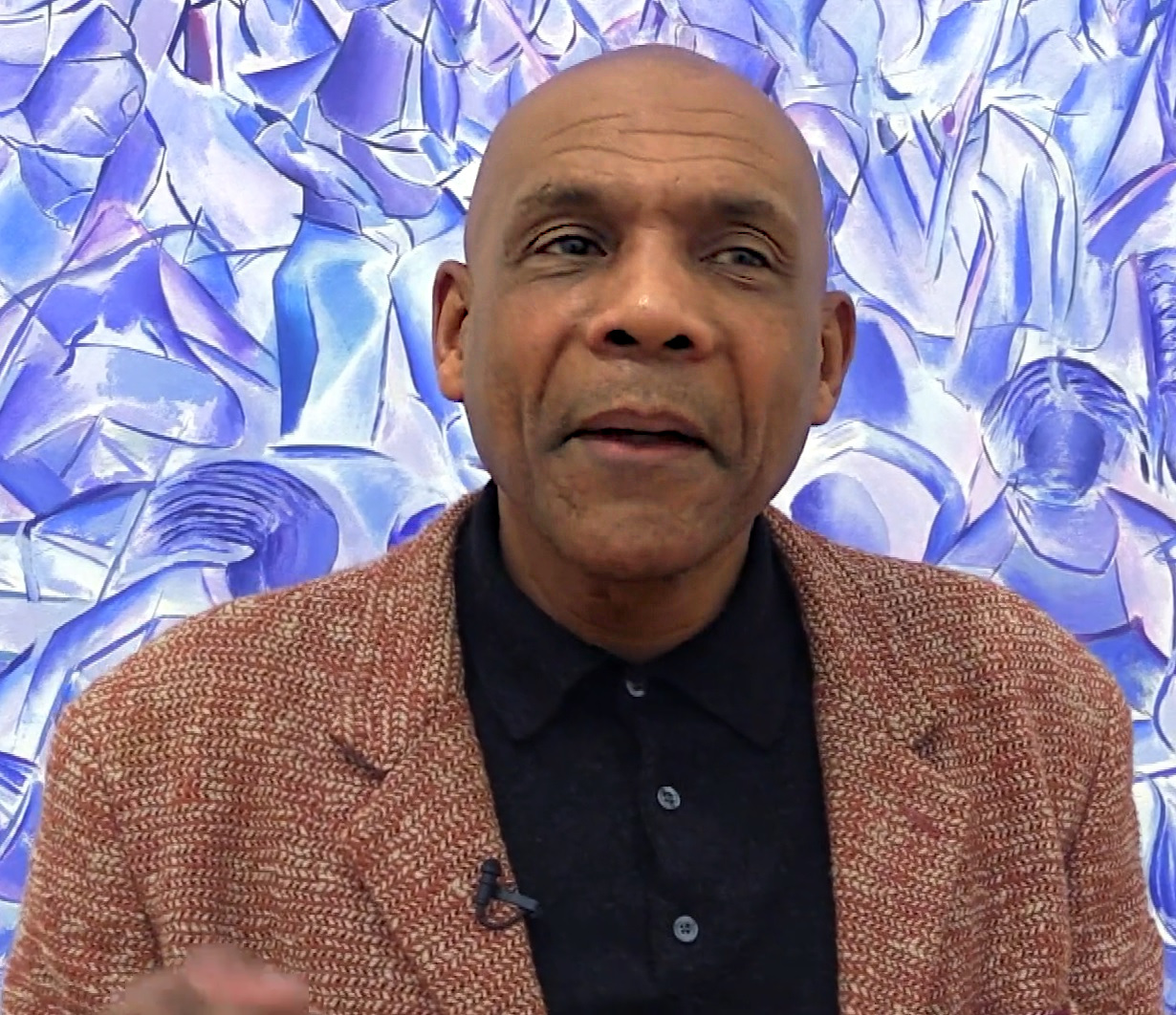
- Forrester in 2020
- Born: 1956 (age 69–70); Grenada, Caribbean
- Education: Central School of Art; Royal College of Art
- Known for: Artist
- Awards: South Bank Sky Arts Award (2021)

Denzil Forrester MBE (born 1956) is a Grenada-born artist who moved to England as a child in 1967. Previously based in London, where he was a lecturer at Morley College, he moved to Truro, Cornwall, in 2016.

== Biography ==
Born in 1956 in Grenada in the Caribbean, Denzil Forrester moved to England when he was aged 10. He attended the Central School of Art, earning a BA degree, and was one of only a few Black artists to gain an MA in Fine Art (Painting) at the Royal College of Art in the early 1980s. Since then, his work has been widely shown in many exhibitions. In 1982, he was included in the Royal Academy Summer Exhibition for the first time with his works "Winston Rose" and "Winston Rose 2" – portraying his friend who had been killed in a police van – and the following year his piece "Dub Charge" was also shown there. In 1983, he won the Rome Scholarship, and subsequently received a Harkness Scholarship that enabled him to spend 18 months in New York City (1986–88).

He has also been the recipient of two major awards at the Royal Academy Summer Show, including in 1987 the Korn/Ferry International Award. His paintings are in the collections of Freshfields, the Arts Council of Great Britain, the Harris Museum and Art Gallery, Preston, the Walker Collection, Atlanta, as well as the Government Art Collection.

Notable exhibitions in which Forrester has participated include From Two Worlds, at the Whitechapel Art Gallery in 1986, and Dub Transition: A Decade of Paintings 1980–1990 (1990). In 1995, he organised and curated The Caribbean Connection, exhibitions and cultural exchanges around the work of Caribbean artists. The exhibition was held from 15 September to 13 October 1995 at the Islington Arts Factory (where Forrester's studio was located) featured Ronald Moody (from Jamaica), Aubrey Williams (Guyana), Frank Bowling (Guyana), John Lyons (Trinidad) and Bill Ming (Bermuda), with the catalogue providing a "Historical Background Sketch" by John La Rose and Errol Lloyd.

Forrester's 2018 exhibition, From Trench Town to Porthowan, at the Jackson Foundation Gallery in Cornwall from 26 May to 23 June that year, was a retrospective curated by Peter Doig and Matthew Higgs.

Forrester is the subject of a documentary film by Julian Henriques entitled Denzil's Dance.

In 2019, Art on the Underground commissioned Forrester's first major public commission, a large-scale artwork titled "Brixton Blue", to be on view at Brixton station from September 2019 to September 2020.

Forrester was appointed Member of the Order of the British Empire (MBE) in the 2021 New Year Honours for services to art.

In 2021, Morley College named an art studio in Forrester's honour, when Sara Robertson-Jonas, Head of Visual and Digital Arts, said: "During his time at Morley, Denzil inspired generations of students to achieve their potential as artists. Denzil epitomises the many high calibre tutors at Morley who are professional artists, musicians and writers who come to share this love of creativity with others. ...It is wonderful to now see him receive international recognition for his work and for us to commemorate his contribution to Morley by naming his favourite teaching space The Denzil Forrester Studio."

In July 2026, Forrester was awarded an Honorary Fellowship by Falmouth University, presented by Chancellor Dawn French in recognition of his contributions to the creative sector and his championing of Cornish and cultural identity through his work.

== Themes ==
In common with other early Black British artists, such as Tam Joseph and Eugene Palmer, having been born in the Caribbean and brought up in the UK Forrester reflects in his paintings a duality of cultural influences; as John Lyons observed: "Denzil's respect for tradition is a manifestation of the will to find an identity within two cultures, Afro-Caribbean and European, for both have played a vital role in his process of maturing as an artist."

Eddie Chambers has characterised Forrester's work as ranging from "dark, brooding and sometimes menacing works, through to bright, liberated paintings resonating with bright and vibrant colours", his subject matter encompassing the atmosphere of nightclubs and of carnival, typically using large-scale canvases to produce paintings that critic John Russell Taylor has called "distinctive and unmistakable". Together with its depictions of street scenes and social commentary about city life, particularly dealing with the racial tensions of the 1980s in the UK, Forrester's work has been described as "a series of historical documents related to the making of Black Britain".

== Selected exhibitions ==
- 2023: Denzil Forrester: We Culture, Institute of Contemporary Art, Miami, United States (6 April 2023 – 24 September 2023)
- 2023: Denzil Forrester: With Q, Stephen Friedman Gallery, London (10 March – 6 April 2023)
- 2023: Duppy Conqueror, Kemper Museum of Contemporary Art, Kansas City, Missouri
- 2020: Itchin & Scratchin, Nottingham Contemporary
- 2019: Denzil Forrester: A Survey, Stephen Friedman Gallery
- 2018: From Trench Town to Porthowan, Jackson Foundation Gallery, Cornwall
- 2015: No Colour Bar: Black British Art in Action 1960–1990, Guildhall Art Gallery, London
- 2008: Quad, Gallery in Cork Street, London
- 2005: Artists Doing It For Themselves, Farringdon, London
- 2001: Fresh Art, Business Design Centre, London
- 2000: The Selectors, Madeleine Pearson Gallery, London
- 1997: Transforming the Crown: African, Asian and Caribbean Artists in Britain, 1966–1996, The Studio Museum in Harlem and The Bronx Museum of Art

—Foundations of Fame, The London Institute

- 1996–97: Imagined Communities, Royal Festival Hall, London
- 1995: The London Art Group, Barbican Art Gallery

—The Caribbean Connection, Islington Arts Factory (15 September–13 October)

- 1990: Rome Scholars 1980–90, Royal College of Art

—Denzil Forrester: Dub Transition: A Decade of Paintings 1980–1990, Harris Museum & Art Gallery, Preston (22 September–3 November)

- 1989: Caribbean Expressions in Britain, Leicester Museum and Art Gallery.
- 1988: New Figurative Painters, The Orangery, London

—Figuring Out the 80s, Laing Gallery, Newcastle —Painters at the Royal College of Art, 150th Anniversary Show

- 1987: Royal Academy of Art Summer Show
- 1986: From Two Worlds, Whitechapel Gallery, London (30 July–7 September)
- 1985: Six Artists in Action, Madeleine Pearson Gallery London

== Awards and recognition ==
- 1983–85: Rome Scholarship
- 1986–88: Harkness Scholarship
- 1987: Korn/Ferry International Award
- 2019: Morley College Fellowship
- 2021: appointed Member of the Order of the British Empire (MBE)
- 2021: South Bank Sky Arts Award for Itchin & Scratchin
- 2026: Honorary Fellowship of Falmouth University (presented by Chancellor Dawn French)
