= Charles Aitken =

British art administrator

- Pencil drawing of Charles Aitken
- Born: 12 September 1869
- Died: 9 August 1936 (aged 66)
- Occupation: Art administrator

Charles Aitken CB (12 September 1869 – 9 August 1936) was a British art administrator and was the third Keeper of the Tate Gallery (1911–1917) and the first Director (1917–1930).

== Life and work ==
Charles Aitken was born at Bishophill, Bishophill Junior, York, England, the son of Henry Martin Aitken, a surgical instrument manufacturer, and his wife, Elizabeth Atkinson. He had two elder sisters including Rosa, former student of Girton College and teacher à North London Collegiate School, and Edith Aitken who would becoming a leading headteacher in South Africa. Charles Aitken studied at New College, Oxford.

He was the first Director of the Whitechapel Art Gallery from 1901 to 1911, and became Keeper at the Tate Gallery in 1911. In 1917 he changed his title from "Keeper" to "Director". Sir John Rothenstein described Aitken as "an ordinary man: his intelligence was relatively pedestrian, his powers of self-expression scarcely adequate". However, Rothenstein considered that the job "brought out qualities that made him a great director: clarity and firmness of purpose".

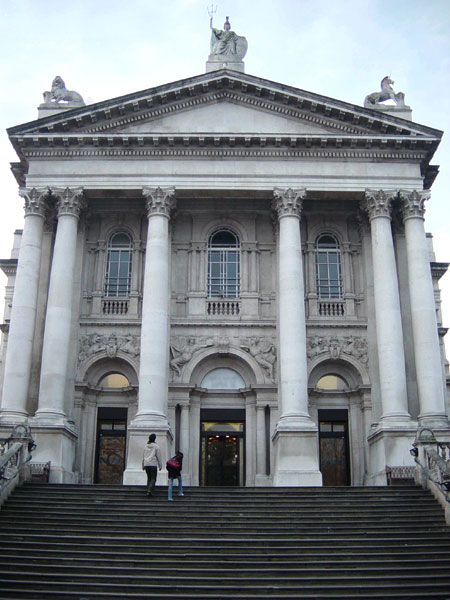
The Tate Gallery, now Tate Britain

When one of the greatest collections of the works of William Blake came on the open market, Aitken, who had no purchasing budget, put together a consortium to save it. Because of the problems caused by dark or foggy days, when the public could not see the artwork by natural light and attendants cleared the galleries due to the difficulty of proper surveillance, Aitken decided to install electric lighting. He also introduced the sale of prints, photographs and catalogues of the Collection.

After Aitken commissioned Rex Whistler to decorate the Tate's Refreshment Room with a mural, The Expedition in Pursuit of Rare Meats, he persuaded Sir Joseph Duveen, an influential art dealer, to finance a similar scheme. Having chosen Morley College in London for the location of the new mural, Aitken and Duveen invited William Rothenstein, the Principal of the Royal College of Art, to submit the names and designs of six young students and ex-students to design the mural. The three chosen students were Edward Bawden, Eric Ravilious and Cyril Mahoney. The mural took them a total of two years to complete.

When the art critic of The Daily Telegraph wrote an article claiming that the sculptures of Jacob Epstein had been universally condemned by critics, Epstein wrote instancing the support of Aitken among other leading names in the art world. In 1909 Aitken co-founded the Modern Art Association, which in 1910 was renamed the Contemporary Art Society.

Following his retirement from the position of Director in 1930, he was appointed a Companion of the Order of the Bath (CB) in the 1931 King's Birthday Honours. He died on 9 August 1936.

== Notes and references ==
Cultural offices
Preceded by D. S. MacColl	Director of the Tate Gallery; 1911–1930	Succeeded by J.B. Manson
