= Rasheed Araeen =

Pakistan-born British artist (born 1935)

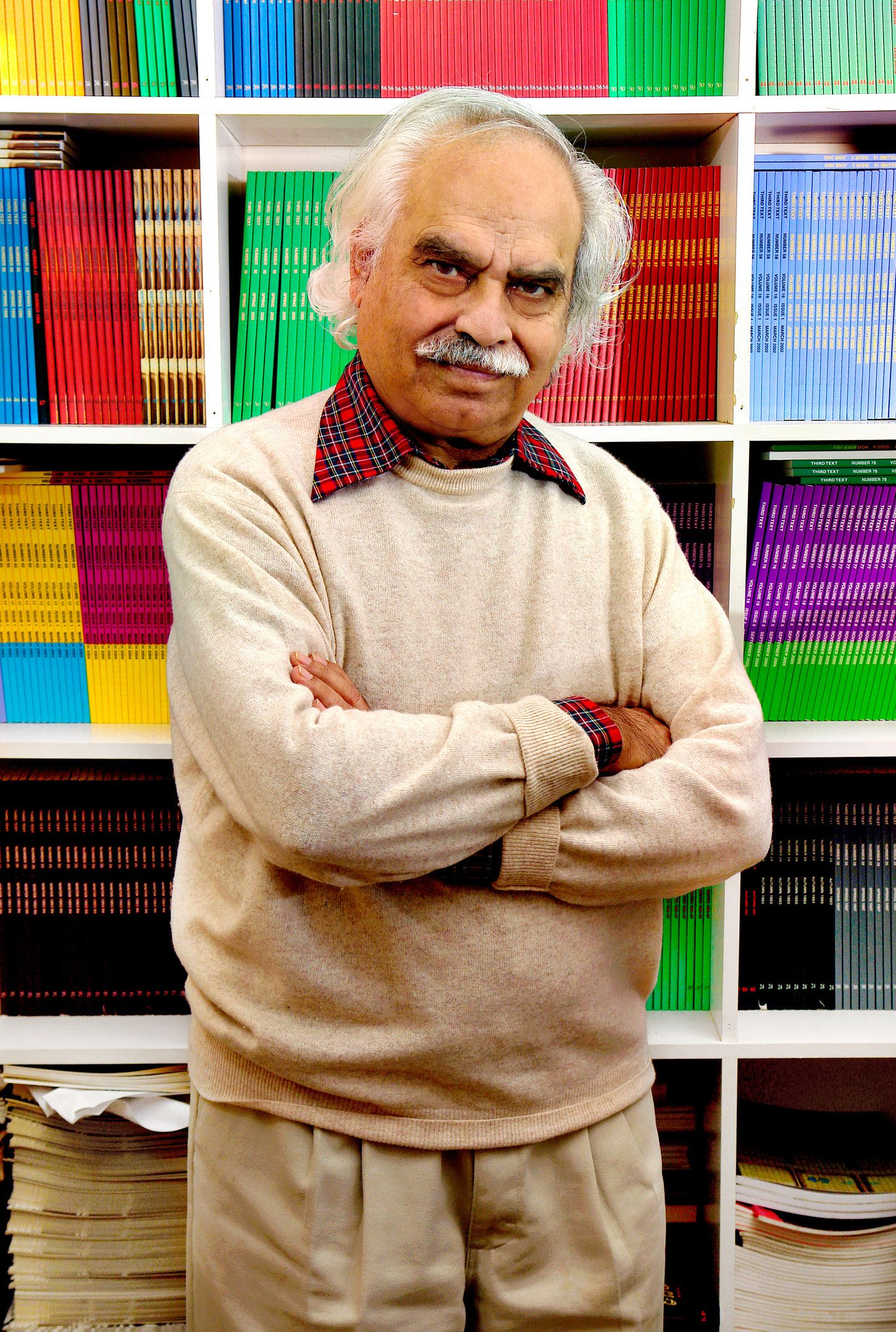
- Araeen photographed by Socrates Mitsios
- Born: 15 June 1935 (age 91); Karachi, Pakistan
- Education: NED University of Engineering and Technology
- Occupations: Conceptual artist, sculptor, painter, writer and curator

Rasheed Araeen (Urdu: رشید آرائیں; born 15 June 1935) is a Karachi-born, London-based conceptual artist, sculptor, painter, writer, and curator. He graduated in civil engineering from the NED University of Engineering and Technology in 1962, and has been working as a visual artist bridging life, art and activism since his arrival in London from Pakistan in 1964.

== Art career ==
Araeen was pursuing a career as an engineer in Karachi, Pakistan, when he was first exposed to avant-garde art. This arrived through two channels: imported Western books and magazines and contact with Pakistani contemporary artists. Consequently, he decided to pursue art-making and embarked on a second career.

Upon arriving in London in 1964, Araeen began working as an artist without any formal training, producing sculptures influenced by Minimalism and the work of Anthony Caro alongside his engineering experience. By his own account, works created or imagined in this period such as Chakras (1969–1970) and Zero to Infinity (1968–2004), while using basic structural units such as cubes, lattice and discs, were process-based and open to transformation by "the creative energy of the collective". Concepts of this period would make ripple effects throughout his career, both formally and politically. Chakras, the 16 red painted circular discs released on the water from Saint Katherine's Dock in 1970, would later evolve and give rise to the concept of Disco Sailing (1970–74), a new form between floating sculpture and dance. The work was revisited and resurrected many times through the decades and performed most recently at Garage Museum in Moscow in 2019.

Starting from the 1970s, Araeen was increasingly concerned with questions of postcolonialism as he struggled with the Eurocentrism of institutions. Centering on issues of identity, representation and racial violence, he created the performance Paki Bastard, Portrait of The Artist as a Black Person (1977), using video projection, live performance and sound. He complemented this with writing statements and manifestos, which he considered to be a "textual form of art".

He also often travelled back to Karachi and make frequent visits to Baluchistan as a "return to the source". These travels have prompted in interest around land art and environmental issues described as "Ecoaesthetics" in his 2010 publication Art Beyond Art.

Araeen participated in Les Magiciens de la Terre (1989); 2nd Johannesburg Biennale (1997), 11th Biennale of Sydney (1998), 9th Shanghai Biennale (212), 9th Gwangju Biennale (2012), 57th Venice Biennale (2017) and documenta 14 (2017). In December 2017, a major retrospective of Araeen's work that featured 60 years of his work was presented at Van Abbemuseum in Eindhoven and then toured to MAMCO in Geneva, the BALTIC in Gateshead, and Garage Museum in Moscow.

== Publishing ==
Araeen's artistic activity has been complemented by writing and publishing. He founded and began editing the journal Black Phoenix in 1978, which came to an abrupt end after three issues. In 1987, he founded the groundbreaking journal Third Text. Third World Perspectives on Contemporary Art and Culture, dealing with art, the Third World, Postcolonialism and ethnicity. In the first decade of its publication, the main aim was to reveal "the institutional closures of the art world and the artists they included, the second began the inquiry into the emergent phenomenon first signaled by the notorious show Magiciens de la terre of the assimilation of the exotic other into the new world art," as Sean Cubitt summarized the goals in the Third Text Reader in 2002. In 1999 Araeen spoke about his own journal Third Text as an attempt to "demolish the boundaries that separate art and art criticism".

Some of Araeen's contributions to Third Text were "From Primitivism to Ethnic Arts / & / Why Third Text?", Third Text #1, Autumn 1987; "Our Bauhaus Others' Mudhouse" [the Magiciens de la terre issue], Third Text #6, Spring 1989, and "Modernity, Modernism and Africa's Authentic Voice", Third Text Vol 24, #2, 2010.

Araeen founded Third Text Asia in 2008. The journal published three issues before ceasing activity.

== Activism and institutional critique ==
Araeen from the early 1970s was among the first cultural practitioners to voice the need for artists of African, Latin American, and Asian origins to be represented in British cultural institutions. He curated exhibitions; initiated and published several journals; and produced art installations and community-based artistic projects.

Before founding the journal Black Phoenix in 1972, he joined the Black Panther Movement and then wrote "Preliminary Notes For A Black Manifesto" in 1975–76. He established a black voice as a publisher, writer, and artist in the British arts. In 1988, he curated the exhibition The Essential Black Art. This provided a foretaste of The Other Story, a larger 1989 exhibition featuring artists including Araeen himself, Frank Bowling, Sonia Boyce, Eddie Chambers, Uzo Egonu, Mona Hatoum, Lubaina Himid, Gavin Jantjes, Donald Locke, David Medalla, Ronald Moody, Ahmed Parvez, Ivan Peries, Keith Piper, F. N. Souza and Aubrey Williams. A groundbreaking exhibition of British African, Caribbean and Asian modernism, The Other Story was mounted at the Hayward Gallery, South Bank Centre, and went on to Wolverhampton Art Gallery and Manchester City Art Gallery and Cornerhouse.

In 2001, Araeen was invited by the Kunsthaus Bregenz in Austria to publish his institutional critique of the present art museum in the publication The Museum as Arena. Araeen published the outcome of his private correspondence with the Ikon Gallery in Birmingham, which had asked him to join an exhibition in 1980 (also published in Rasheed Araeen, Making Myself Visible). His proposal was declined when the other ten artists refused to show their work alongside his. Their opposition not only manifested cultural conflicts but was also meant to defend the purity of the gallery space where Araeen had proposed to perform the slaughter and consumption of a goat (according to a Muslim ritual). Along with the actual performance, he had announced that he would display and tear up "the pages of a contemporary art history book". Thus, the action directed against the exclusionary aesthetics of the art gallery was complemented with a rejection of the official story of modernist art and avant-garde history. Araeen's main key writings were edited in Spanish by curator José-Carlos Mariátegui and Metales Pesados, as Del Cero al Infinito: Escritos de Arte y Lucha. In 2019, Araeen opened Shamiyaana, a restaurant/space in Stoke Newington, where people can enjoy simple, vibrant, nourishing, low-cost food in an environment purpose-designed for conversation and eating.

== Sources ==
- Making Myself Visible (London: Kala Press, 1984)
- From Modernism to Postmodernism: Rasheed Araeen: a Retrospective, exhibition catalogue, essays by P. Bickers, J. Roberts, and D. Phillipi (Birmingham: Ikon Gal., 1987)
- From Two Worlds (London: Whitechapel Art Gallery, 1986)
- Global Visions: Towards a New Internationalism in the Visual Arts (London: Kala Press, 1994)
- Rasheed Araeen, exhibition catalogue, essay by P. Overy (London: S. London A. G., 1994)
- Rasheed Araeen: Del Cero al Infinito: Escritos de Arte y Lucha, essay by José-Carlos Mariátegui (Santiago de Chile, Metales Pesados, 2019).
