= White cube gallery =

Type of art gallery

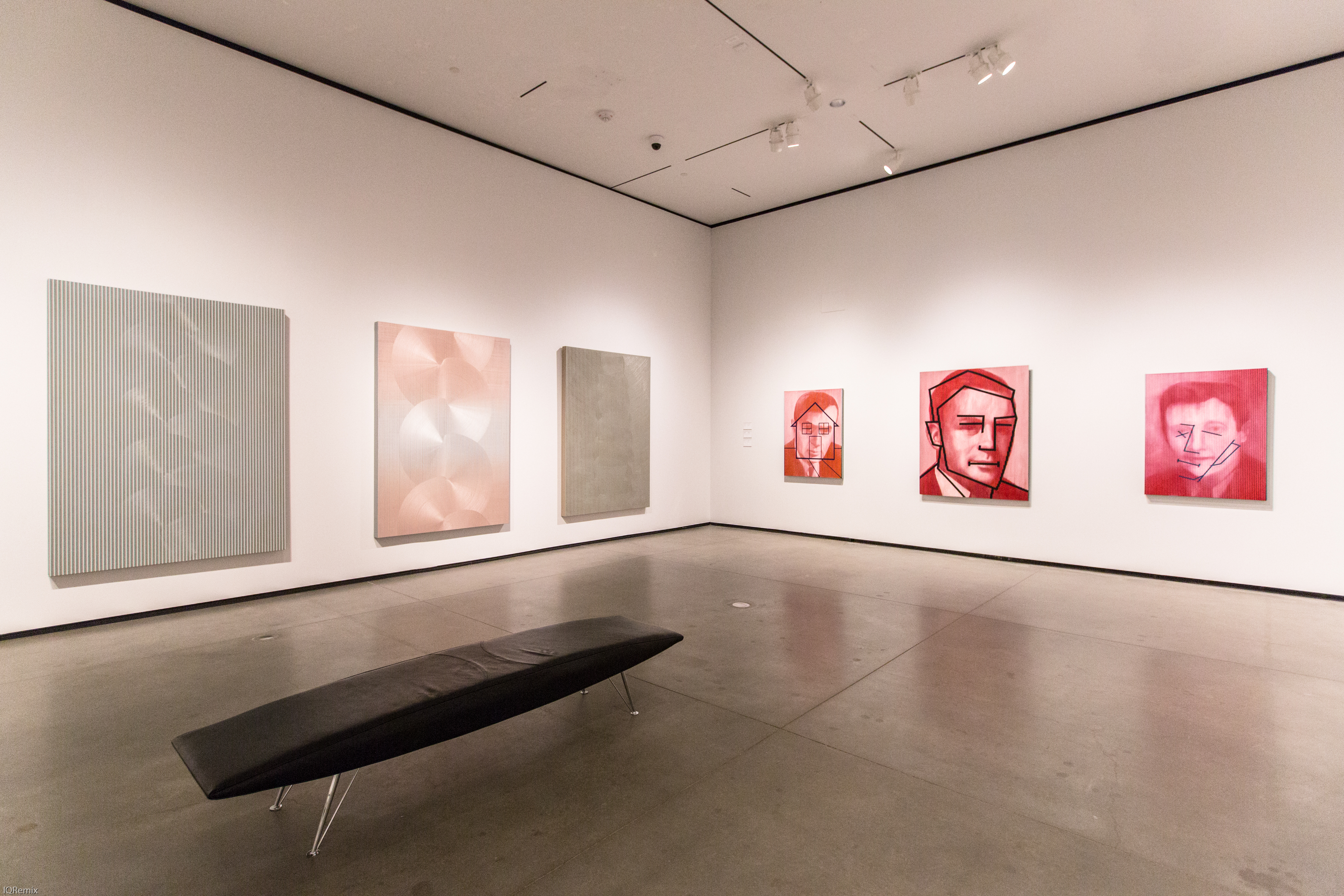
A concrete-floored "white cube" space at the Art Gallery of Alberta

A white cube gallery is a gallery style that is square or rectangular shape, has unadorned white walls and a light source usually in the ceiling. It typically has hardwood or polished concrete floors. In the early twentieth century art became more abstract and groups such as the Bauhaus and de Stijl demanded their works were displayed on white walls; to them the background was integral to the picture, it was the frame. James Abbott McNeill Whistler's 1883 show at London's Fine Art Society has been cited as perhaps the first "white cube" show, the artworks being framed in white and hung against a white felt background.

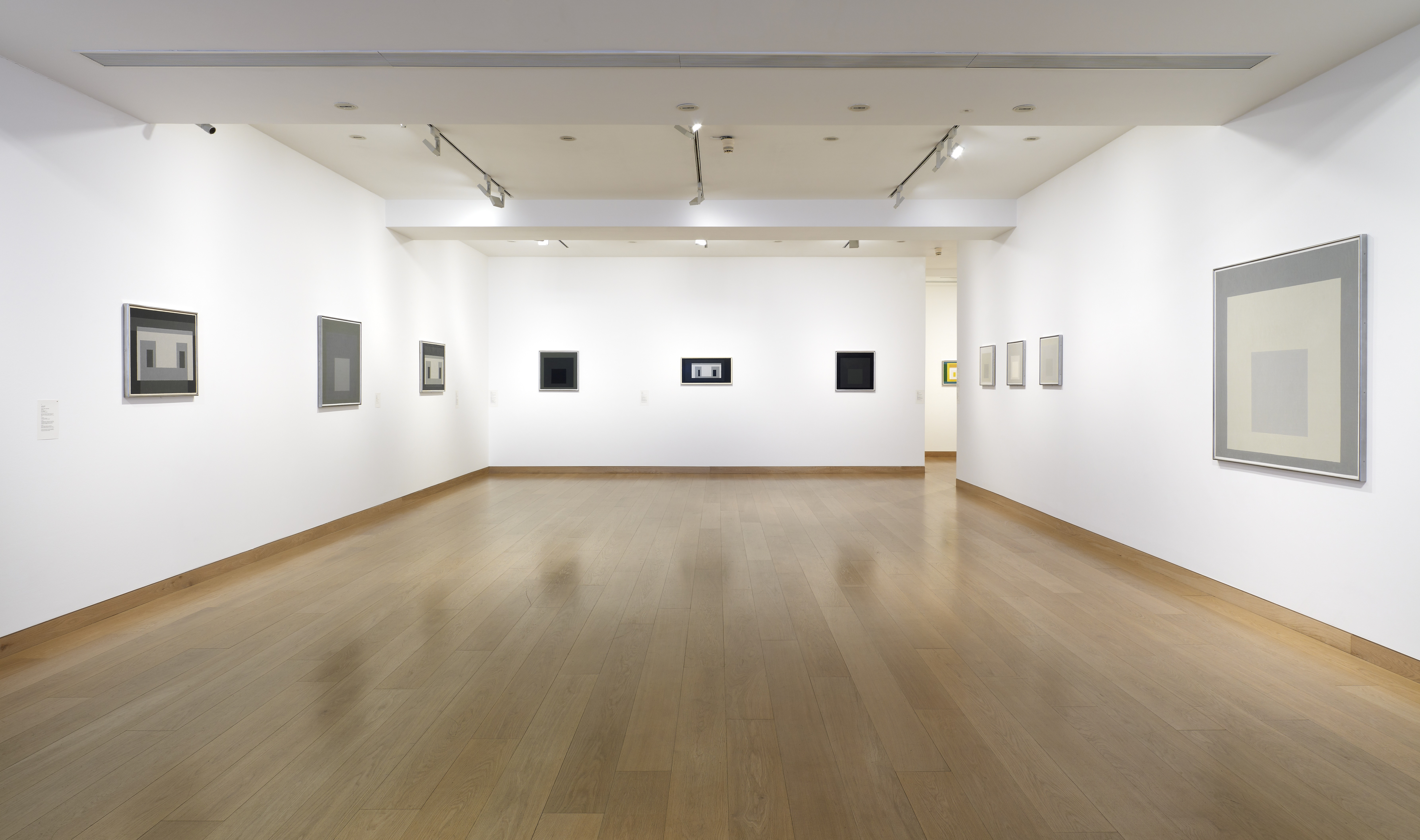
A hardwood floor white cube space at Waddington Custot in London

By 1976 the White Cube aesthetic was being criticised by Brian O'Doherty as a modernist obsession. In Inside the White Cube: The Ideology of the Gallery Space, he argued that in an easel painting the frame was the window through which one saw the world, and that required a wall for context. When the frame is gone and the wall is white, in O'Doherty's view, perspective and formal composition are absent. O'Doherty describes the flatness of Monet as eroding the line of an edge, and sees the White Cube as redefining the picture plane. O'Doherty argues that it becomes no longer enough to use the white wall as a frame to the art, but in Modernism it becomes necessary to redefine the work to exploit it, to fill it. He writes that the spectator must ask: "Where must I stand?"

O'Doherty describes the context of the white space as mirroring twentieth-century society where life has become divorced from geography. In Postmodernism he sees that art is designed to be difficult, expensive and excluding. To O'Doherty, the white cube space is a designed social, financial, and intellectual snobbery, where art has to occupy large expensive spaces. He sees the white walls’ neutrality as an illusion, binding artist and the elite spectator together, while the cube is an acceptance of the estrangement of the artist from society and the artist who accepts the gallery space is conforming with the social order.

In 2003, Charles Saatchi launched an attack on the concept of the white wall gallery, calling it "antiseptic" and a "time warp ... dictated by museum fashion". Writing in 2015, art critic Jonathan Jones felt that while there was once "real shock in walking into a gallery as white and pure as a Stanley Kubrick space station", the style had since become conventional and uninspiring.

The White Pube duo of critics chose their name in criticism of the white cube style in general, and of the London gallery.
