= Al-An deSouza =

American artist (born 1958)

- Born: 1958 (age 67–68); Nairobi, Kenya
- Education: Goldsmiths College; Bath Academy of Art, University of California, Los Angeles
- Employer: University of California, Berkeley
- Spouse: Yong Soon Min

Al-An deSouza (formerly known as Allan deSouza, born 1958) is a Kenyan transmedia artist, photographer, writer, and academic. Their work deals with issues of migration, overlapping histories, and the poetics of relocation. They are a professor in the Department of Art Practice at the University of California, Berkeley.

== Early life and education ==
DeSouza was born in Nairobi, Kenya, to South Asian parents originally from Goa, India. Their mother was born in Kenya and their father had left Goa while it was still a Portuguese colony. Soon after Kenyan independence, deSouza aged seven, emigrated in 1965 with their family to London, England.

They were educated in both the UK and the United States. DeSouza attended Goldsmiths College in London, and earned a Bachelor of Fine Arts from Bath Academy of Art in 1983. They moved to the United States in 1992, participating in the Whitney Independent Study Program in New York and earning an MFA in photography from the University of California, Los Angeles (UCLA) in 1997.

== Career ==
As artist, activist, educator, writer, and curator, DeSouza was an active participant in Britain's Black Arts movement during the 1980s, and were part of artist collectives Community Copyart, and Panchayat Arts and Education Resource Unit, which they founded with Shaheen Merali. The Panchayat Collection is now held at the Tate Britain, London.

Moving to New York in the early 90s, they joined and were active within Godzilla, Asian American Artists network. DeSouza has had numerous solo exhibitions, including at the Johnson Museum, Ithaca; the University of Seville; University of Delaware, Newark; Krannert Art Museum, Champaign; Yerba Buena Center for the Arts, SF; the Phillips Collection, DC; Fowler Museum, Los Angeles; and the Rencontres Africaines de la Photographie, Bamako, Mali. Group exhibitions include at Tate Britain, London; National Museum of Modern and Contemporary Art, Seoul; Asia Society, NY; Blaffer Art Museum, Houston National Museum of African Art, DC; Centre Georges Pompidou, Paris; Museo Tamayo, Mexico City; Johannesburg Art Gallery; Mori Art Museum, Tokyo; Gulbenkian Museum, Lisbon; Moderna Museet, Stockholm; Stedelijk Museum, Amsterdam[16]; and Talwar Gallery, which represents the artist, in New York and New Delhi.

DeSouza collaborated with Yong Soon Min between 1991 and 2008, producing joint multi-media installations, performances, photographs, and texts. Drawing upon their overlapping histories of migration, they have exhibited together in numerous group shows, with solo shows at OBORO Gallery, Montreal, Canada; Camerawork, London, England; and with major installations at the Baguio Arts Festival, Philippines (with Luis Francia); 3rd Guangzhou Triennial, China; 7th Gwangju Biennale, South Korea (as MYDADA with Abdelali Dahrouch); and the 1993 Whitney Biennial, New York (part of Shu Lea Chang's installation).

DeSouza has written extensively about pedagogy, and contemporary art, contributing to publications such as X-TRA Contemporary Art Quarterly, Wolgan Art Monthly, College Art Association Art Journal, and Third Text, as well as numerous catalogs and anthologies. DeSouza is the author of the books Ark of Martyrs: An Autobiography of V, 2020 (Sming Sming Books, San José); How Art Can Be Thought: A Handbook for Change, 2018 (Duke University Press); Crossing Black Waters, 1992 (co-edited with Shaheen Merali, Working Press London); and The Sikhs in Britain, 1986 (Batsford, London). Ark of Martyrs is a polyphonic, dysphoric replacement of Joseph Conrad's infamous 1899 novella, Heart of Darkness. How Art Can Be Thought examines art pedagogy and critique, and how some of the most common terms used to discuss art may be adapted to new artistic and social challenges.

DeSouza is Professor of Photography in the Department of Art Practice at the University of California, Berkeley, having also served as department chair for six years. They were previously Associate Professor and Chair of the New Genres department at the San Francisco Art Institute (SFAI) from 2006 until 2012. DeSouza has also taught at Bard College; Vermont College of Fine Arts (VCFA); University of Arizona, Tucson; School of the Art Institute, Chicago (SAIC); UC Irvine; and the California Institute of the Arts (CalArts); and has lectured at universities and schools across the globe, including Carnegie Mellon University, Edinburgh University, Royal College of Art, London, Seika University in Kyoto, Japan, University of Seville, UCLA, and Concordia University, Montreal.

DeSouza has been awarded a number of artist residencies and fellowships, including the Arts Research Center Poetry and the Senses Fellowship, UC Berkeley, 2023; Mellon Visiting Senior Fellowship, The Center for Advanced Study in the Visual Arts, National Gallery, Washington DC, 2022; Humanities Research Fellowship, UC Berkeley, 2019; Yaddo Artist Residency, 2019; Rockefeller Foundation Arts and Literary Arts Residency at the Bellagio Center in Lake Como, Italy, 2012; California Community Foundation/Getty Fellowship, 2008; Art in General residency, NY, 2001; and Light Work residency, Syracuse, 2001.

== Artwork ==
DeSouza engages with issues of migration, displacement, and relocation in much of their artwork. Their photoworks, texts, and installations examine geography, culture, and personal and collective histories, often sourcing existing archives such as travelogs, novels, and familial photographs. Their photographic work, The World Series, for example, was created as a response to Jacob Lawrence's The Migration Series. deSouza is interested in movement, travel, dislocation, memory, and the passage of time.

For the photographic series The Lost Pictures, DeSouza placed a number of slides of old family photos around their house, deliberately allowing them to become scratched, faded, and covered in dust. deSouza's work, in the words of one critic, "explores...both memory and photography as means of recording and preserving the past from aging, loss, displacement, and historical change." Although often based on archival sources, historical figures or events, deSouza's work also incorporates "fiction, erasure, re-inscription, and (mis)translation".

== Performances ==
- 2009: University of North Carolina, Chapel Hill, Bodies in Transit, Chapel Hill, North Carolina
- 2008: New Geographies in Contemporary African Art, presentation, Flyboy, Harvard University, Cambridge, Massachusetts
- 2003: Oboro Gallery, Will **** for Peace, collaboration with Yong Soon Min, Montreal, Canada
