= Iqbal Geoffrey =

Pakistani-American painter (1939–2021)

- Born: Mohammed Jawaid Iqbal Jafree; 1939; Chiniot, Pakistan
- Died: 2021 (aged 81–82); Lahore, Pakistan
- Occupation: Artist
- Spouses: Regina Wai-ling Cheng (m. 1967; div. 1978) Ceyyeda Ferzawne Nuccwe (m. 1988)
- Children: 2

Iqbal Geoffrey (1939–2021) was a Pakistani-American modernist painter.

== Early life and education ==
Born Mohammed Jawaid Iqbal Jafree in Chiniot, Geoffrey graduated in accountancy and law from Government College and the University of Punjab in Lahore before moving to London in 1960 to begin his artistic career.

Geoffrey relocated to the United States in 1962, where he continued to work as an artist and lawyer, completing an LLM from Harvard University in 1966. Geoffrey has participated in numerous solo and group exhibitions around the world, most notably the 1965 Paris Biennale where he won the Laureate Award, the Sao Paulo Biennial, and The Other Story, curated by Rasheed Araeen at the Hayward Gallery in 1989.

== Career ==
Geoffrey's early abstract paintings were influenced by Urdu and Arabic calligraphy, Informel and Art Brut painting, and Zen ink painters including Sesshū Tōyō. Geoffrey was one of many artists from Britain's former colonies to move to London during the postwar period. He exhibited frequently in the city and his painting Epitaph (1958) became one of the first works by an Asian artist to enter the Tate Collection. In 1962 Geoffrey moved to the United States to become an artist in residence at the Huntington Hartford Foundation in California and later the MacDowell (artists' residency and workshop) in New Hampshire.

During the early 1960s, Geoffrey's work began to include found objects and collage elements including personal items, Xerox pages, and Letraset transfers. He also undertook various conceptual performances and happenings, including burning his paintings. Geoffrey again exhibited widely in the United States during the 1960s and early 1970s, including at the Grand Central Moderns Gallery, New York; Warde Nasse Gallery, Boston; and the Herbert F. Johnson Museum of Art, Ithaca. He also worked for a time as a Human Rights Officer at the United Nations and taught painting at universities including St. Mary's College of Maryland, Notre Dame University, and Central Washington State College. Between 1973 and 1985, Geoffrey worked as an Assistant Attorney General and later an independent lawyer in Chicago.

In 2015, Geoffrey filed a petition for the return of the 105 carat Koh-I-Noor diamond, (part of the Crown Jewels), to Pakistan on the basis that the diamond was removed "forcibly and under duress" during British colonial rule.

== Personal life ==
In 1967, Geoffrey entered into marriage with Regina Wai-ling Cheng. However, their union ended in divorce in 1978. Subsequently, Geoffrey married Ceyyeda Ferzawne Nuccwe on March 3, 1988. From his first marriage with Regina, Geoffrey had two children, Syed Hussain Haider and Shahzadi Zohra Elinoi Cheng.

== Collections ==
The Tate Gallery Museum of Fine Arts, Boston
