= Yu Hong =

Chinese contemporary artist

Yu Hong (Chinese: 喻红; born 1966) is a Chinese contemporary artist. Her works characteristically portray the female perspectives in all stages of life and the relationship between the individual and the rapid social changes taking place in China. She works primarily in oil paint but also in pastels, fabric dye on canvas, silk and resin. Yu Hong is "routinely named amongst China’s leading female artists". Her work is celebrated for its intimacy, honesty and tactility.

== Life ==
Yu Hong was born in Xi'an, Shaanxi Province in 1966 and lives and works in Beijing and New York. In 1988 she received a Bachelor of Fine Arts degree from the Oil Painting Department of the Central Academy of Fine Arts in Beijing, where she received a thorough training in the techniques of figural realism. Early in her career, her paintings combined realistic portraits with surreal environments and colors. However, as she progressed, her focus on surrealism eventually dissipated. Instead, she focused more on her skills of observation and became very sensitive to facial expressions and body posture. She married fellow Chinese contemporary artist Liu Xiaodong in the summer of 1993 and became a mother not long after.

In 1996, Hong completed her postgraduate studies at the Central Arts Institute of Beijing. In addition, she and a small group of colleagues became known as the “New Generation” artists, known for their highly personal figurative works.

Hong now holds tenure as a professor of Oil painting at the Central Academy of Fine Arts (CAFA) in Beijing.

In 2023, she was part of the jury for the John Moores Painting Prize along with Alexis Harding, Chila Kumari Singh Burman, Marlene Smith, and The White Pube.

== Work ==
Hong’s subjects are predominately women. In the history of Chinese art, women were often depicted engaged in everyday activities created by men who overlaid that subject with symbolic ramifications – the female point of view was not a viable mode of creation. Hong’s work is different because she honors the female (and by extension, the individual) in all phases of life, from childhood to maturity. She does not swathe her images with extreme symbolism or sentimentality. Her subjects usually consist of herself, her friends, family and her daughter, Liu Wa. Her method of painting is immensely personal and has been criticized as seemingly mundane, but she highlights the beauty in the intricacies of daily life, friendship, love and the impact of the environment on people.

=== Witness To Growth ===
In 2000, Hong began to work on ‘Witness to Growth’; a series of paintings created for each year of her life. Each painting is a one-meter square canvas with an image of herself based on the photograph taken at the time. She does not pay special attention to keeping a similar image; instead, some of the paintings seemed posed while others are spontaneous. Hong uses compositions and colors to capture important ideas or experiences/moods to commemorate that time. For her 29th year/painting, she painted two portraits; in one, she is pregnant and in the next she has given birth. From there, Hong began to paint her young daughter in attempts to chronicle her life as well. Upon exhibiting ‘Witness to Growth’ for the first time, Hong placed a newspaper or magazine article to complement each image. ‘Witness to Growth’ is a ubiquitous series of works because it is a self-examination of the artist and her surroundings. By linking herself to events that happened around her or around the world, Hong puts herself and her life on critical display. The juxtaposition of social and political events against personal moments creates a tension and highlights the disparity between inner and outer events.

“I show that my life and China changes: from a cultural revolution to right now.”.

=== She ===
In 2003, Hong embarked on a new visual journey with her series ‘She’. According to Hong, she “knew all these women so [she] went to their place – where they live, where they work and I painted what I saw in their life.”

The paintings included: “She: Beautiful Writer Zhao Bo”, “She: Art School Student” and “She: Tibetan Woman Zhou Ma” among others. These paintings make clear the possibilities to be mined within the subject and highlight the role of the contemporary woman in Chinese society.

In particular, “She: Beautiful Writer Zhao Bo” captured the attitude and lifestyle of successful young women in the new China. The splashes of bold color exhibit Hong’s ‘edgy color sense’ and signature painterly manner.

=== Golden Horizon/Sky (The Gold Series) ===
Hong and her husband Liu Xiaodong are often compared as having similar approaches to their work and as Liu’s work has grown more famous, Hong’s work took a slight backseat to his. However, in recent years she has begun to explore different approaches to her work, distinguishing herself from the work of her husband without abandoning her usual subject matter. ‘Golden Horizon’ displayed works created before 2011 that displayed the application of gold foil that is connected to ancient traditional Chinese painting and religious painting. ‘Golden Sky’, 2009, features four works exhibited on the ceiling of the gallery so one must look up as if in a cathedral or a palace. This was done to maintain a certain distance from the audience to the paintings. This method was chosen to reproduce the atmosphere around traditional religious paintings as the piece works in tandem with the environment to create an overall feeling in those who view it. Each work is a spin on a preexisting and already famous work of art; two with Western ties and two with Chinese ties.

‘Atrium’ was inspired by Giuseppe Maria Crespis’ ‘Trionfo di Ercole’ which exists on the ceiling of the Palozzo Pepoli in Bologna. Others are inspired by Francisco Goya’s ‘Ridiculous Folly’ and Buddhist cave frescoes.

Hong places contemporary renderings of people against golden backdrops with the intention of making the viewer look more closely at those around them. “The gold series is about the relationship [between] ancient and modern relationships in Western [societies] and in China." Placing them on the ceiling almost monumentalizes them and forces the viewer to contemplate the meaning of the piece. “I think gold leaf is very special, very powerful. It perfectly suits China’s wealthy dream,” said Hong in an interview conducted by Perfect Crossovers.

==== Fresh Ink ====
‘Fresh Ink: Ten Takes on Chinese Tradition’ was an Exhibition held at the Museum of Fine Arts in Boston in 2010 to 2011 that featured the work of ten contemporary Chinese ink painters engaging in dialogue with classical artworks from China’s past. Leading Chinese artists came to Boston to study the Museum of Fine Arts vast collection of Chinese Art and were prompted to create new works in response to those they saw. The works they created were juxtaposed against the works they studied. It was a way to add modern commentary to a long-standing Chinese tradition. ‘Romance of Spring’ was Hong’s response to the iconic masterpiece: ‘Court Ladies Preparing Newly Woven Silk’. She stepped outside her usual comfort zone – oil on canvas – and worked with thinly mixed acrylics on silk instead. The result yielded the same look and feel of traditional brush and ink. ‘Romance of Spring’ fit in nicely with the Gold series, which she was also working on at the time, because the approach is the same, and the silk is gold.

The paintings were hung on the ceiling and resonated with the subject of court ladies while simultaneously drawing attention to the materiality of the painting.

=== Garden of Dreams ===
‘Garden of Dreams’ was a solo exhibition by the artist in 2016 and one of her largest to date, featuring 19 works in a series of the same name. Shown at the CAFA Art Museum in Beijing, these were large-scale works that incorporated characters, events and landscapes from ancient Chinese fables into a traditional Chinese garden. Hong used her tool of the trade, to connect the stories and does so by including news from recent years, to integrate (and juxtapose) the ancient against the contemporary. This results in the creation of a “Parallel World” – there are strange things in a derelict but oddly vivid colored garden and is a space that contradicts itself by design.

As a student, Hong was interested in the Surrealist movement but abandoned it for authentic figure painting. With ‘Garden of Dreams’ her previous interest in Surrealism has been reawakened and each piece has tinges of the style – common is her use of vivid color and expressive painterly stroke. In some of the pieces, like ‘A Garden of Dreams’, we can see influences of painters such as Hieronymus Bosch and his ‘Garden of Earthly Delights’. Previous work like ‘Golden Sky’ and ‘Romance of Spring’ most likely prompted Hong to create these paintings with the same amount of research and thought.

‘Garden of Dreams’ is a response to the messy un-relatedness of daily life and how they can influence the person who is experiencing them. “I want to put these diverse, disordered, chaotic elements together, which is my response or feeling of this real society,” said Hong.

== Selected exhibitions ==
Hong has participated in numerous exhibitions starting in the mid-1980s, including Yu Hong: Garden of Dreams, CAFA Annual Fine Arts Nomination Exhibition, Beijing, China, 2016; Concurrent Realms, Suzhou Museum, Suzhou, China, 2015; Wondering Clouds, Long March Space, Beijing, China, 2013; Golden Horizon, Shanghai Art Museum, Shanghai, China, 2011; Golden Sky, Ullens Center for Contemporary Art, Beijing, China, 2010; Fresh Ink: Ten Takes on Chinese Tradition, Boston Museum of Fine Arts, Boston, MA, USA, 2010; In and Out of Time – Yu Hong, Guangdong Museum of Art, Guangzhou, China, 2009; Yu Hong: Witness to Growth, Eslite Gallery, Taipei, Taiwan, 2007; Yu Hong, Loft Gallery, Paris, France, 2006; A Woman’s Life, The Art of Yu Hong, Halsey Gallery, College of Charleston, SC, USA, 2003; Yu Hong: Witness To Growth, Museum of Hubei Institute of Fine Arts, Wuhan, China, 2003; Yu Hong & Liu Xiaodong : Recent Paintings, OIPA East Village, New York, NY, USA, 1994; Yu Hong’s Painting, Gallery of Central Academy of Fine Art, Beijing, China, 1990; The World of Woman Artists, CAFA Art Museum, Beijing, China, 1990; Nude Painting Exhibition, National Art Museum of China, Beijing, China, 1988; and The First Oil Painting Exhibition of China, Shanghai Art Museum, Shanghai, China, 1986.

== Public collections ==
Hong's work is included in several public collections, including Singapore Art Museum, SIngapore; Dong Yu Art Museum, Shenyang, China; Shanghai Art Museum, Shanghai, China; Upriver Art Museum, Chengdu, China; China Art Gallery, China; and Ludwig Gallery, Germany.
