= Donald Rodney =

British artist (1961–1998)

Donald Gladstone Rodney (18 May 1961 – 4 March 1998) was a British artist. He was a leading figure in Britain's BLK Art Group of the 1980s and became recognised as "one of the most innovative and versatile artists of his generation." Rodney's work appropriated images from the mass media, art and popular culture to explore issues of racial identity and racism.

== Early life and career ==
Rodney was born and raised in Birmingham, England by Jamaican parents. He completed a pre-degree course at Bournville School of Art and went on to complete an honours degree in Fine Art at Trent Polytechnic in Nottingham, graduating in the 1980s. There, he met Keith Piper, also from Birmingham. Piper was to influence Rodney's work towards more political themes. The works of Rodney and Piper, alongside Eddie Chambers, Marlene Smith and Claudette Johnson became recognised as a distinct movement within British art, known as the BLK Art Group, whose attachments were to social and political narratives.

In 1987, Rodney completed a Postgraduate Diploma in Multi-Media Fine Art at University College London's Slade School of Fine Art.

"Autoicon" by Donald Rodney is an innovative project that merges art and technology, conceived in the mid-1990s and completed posthumously in 1998. Inspired by Jeremy Bentham's nineteenth-century "Auto-Icon," Rodney's work extends his personhood and critiques dominant views of the self and the body. Grounded in medical documents chronicling Rodney's battle with sickle-cell anemia, "Autoicon" features a Java-based AI and neural network that interacts with users through text-based chats, drawing from Rodney's extensive archive and the Internet to create evolving images. Curator Richard Birkett's "One Work" edition examines the project's ongoing relevance, linking it to Rodney's 1997 exhibition "9 Night in Eldorado" and discussing its engagement with themes of racialization, ableism, and the intersection of human and posthuman discourses.

== Death and legacy ==
Rodney had sickle-cell anaemia, a debilitating disease that grew steadily worse during his life. This led to an interest in discarded hospital X-rays and other medical themes that began to inform his work. Rodney used X-rays as a metaphor to represent the "disease" of apartheid and racial discrimination in society.

On 4 March 1998 Rodney died from the disease.

After his death, Rodney's work was shown in the prestigious British art show 5. He was also included in the show Give and Take, Works Presented to Museums by the Contemporary Art Society held at the Harris Museum and the Jerwood Gallery (2000).

Photographer Brenda Agard is interviewed in the 1995 film Three Songs on Pain Light and Time, about the life and work of Rodney as part of the Black Arts Video Project series by the Black Audio Film Collective.

In 2003 Rodney's papers were donated to the Tate Archive.

The exhibition Donald Rodney - In Retrospect took place at Iniva, London, 30 October–29 November 2008.
