= Chinese Nude Oils Exhibition =

Nude art exhibition in Beijing, China

Chinese Nude Oils Exhibition (油画人体艺术大展) is the first public exhibition of nude art in Beijing and it is considered one of the most significant exhibitions in the history of Chinese contemporary art. Opening on December 12, 1988, at the National Art Museum of China, this exhibition included over 136 paintings of nude art from 28 artists in Central Academy of Fine Arts. The exhibition lasted for 18 days, with more than 220,000 visitors attended.

== Background and controversy ==
At this time, the introduction of nude models into the teaching of human body painting in Chinese art academies was less than ten years old, and the public was still controversial about human body painting. Models at the Central Academy of Fine Arts suspended classes to protest the school's breach of its promise to keep them confidential. Since this exhibition, portraits and body paintings have gradually entered the Chinese public's horizons.

== Representative Art works ==
The human body oil painting Girl in Front of Still Life (Yang Feiyun, 1988) was selected as the cover of the "Oil Painting Exhibition" album, and has always been considered one of the representative works of the exhibition. This work was auctioned at the Beijing Poly Spring Modern and Contemporary Art Auction held on June 2, 2012, with a starting price of 4.6 million yuan, and was finally sold for 34.5 million yuan. Double Human Body (Jin Shangyi, 1983), another important art work presented during the Chinese Nude Oils Exhibition, is Jin Shangyi's largest human body work and was sold for 63.25 million rmb on the China Guardian Auctions at 2019.

In addition, presented artists during the exhibitions include senior oil painting artist Lin Gang, non-oil painting teachers such as Guang Jun from the printmaking department, Sun Jingbo from the mural painting department, and young teachers who have just graduated, such as Meng Luding and Yu Hong.
