= The Art House =

Art gallery in West Yorkshire, England

Coordinates: 53.6824°N 1.5035°W

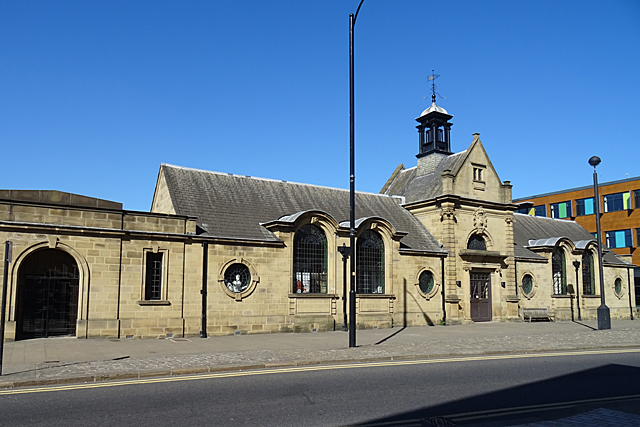
The older part of the Art House, in 2018

The Art House is an art gallery and studio complex in the city centre of Wakefield, in West Yorkshire, in England.

The Art House was founded in 1994 as a charity, to enable artists with and without disabilities to work together. Initially, it organised events and residencies, but in 2008, it moved into a purpose-built space, on Drury Lane. It then secured funding to expand into the adjoining former library. Its new premises opened in 2015, with 34 studios, an art gallery, meeting room, and shop.

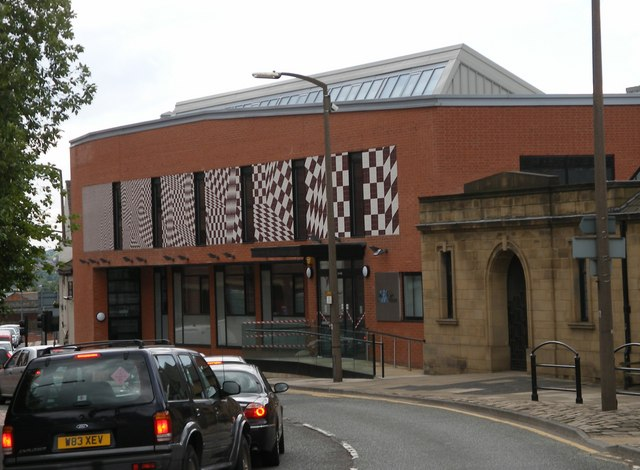
The 2008 part of Art House, soon after opening

The older part of the building was originally a Carnegie library, completed in 1905. It is in the Baroque style, built of stone, with a slate roof. It is single storey, with an entrance tower, which is topped by a wooden cupola and an iron weathervane. The north and south wings each have two large, round-headed windows, with decorative keystones. Either side of these are round windows. At the north end is a three-bay extension, with a central doorway. Inside, there is a central entrance hall, with a domed roof, and three large rooms leading off it. The building was Grade II listed in 1990.

== See also ==
- Listed buildings in Wakefield
