= The White Pube =

British art criticism duo

- Named after: White cube galleries
- Formation: 2015; 11 years ago
- Founders: Gabrielle de la Puente; Zarina Muhammad
- Fields: Art criticism Art grants
- Website: thewhitepube.co.uk

The White Pube is a progressive identity of writers Gabrielle de la Puente and Zarina Muhammad. They have been described as "one of the first truly new voices in British art criticism in the twenty-first century".

The pair met in 2013 on the BA Fine Art Course at Central St Martins and out of frustration with "white people, white walls and white wine", began to publish reviews, essays and social media posts to challenge the art world's lack of representation and accessibility and to redefine what is deemed worthy of aesthetic attention. Their subjective and personal approach to art writing has been labelled "embodied criticism" and incorporates emotional responses and overtly political analysis of artworks in an informal yet stylistically innovative style.

== Work ==
Their curatorial work includes "Zayn Malik Zindabad", a screening of moving image art by artists in the South Asian diaspora and "The Leaf of Pablo" at Hutt Collective, Nottingham. The White Pube website hosts monthly online residencies with artists from marginalised identities.

Since 2017, Muhammed and De la Puente have published their financial accounts on their website in an effort to help create transparency around industry pay.

In 2020, The White Pube received media attention for alleging institutional racism at Tate, the British art museum. They published social media posts focusing on the gallery network's ongoing relationship with Anthony d'Offay and the display of a mural by Rex Whistler containing imagery in one of its restaurants that they perceived as racist.

Since 2020, The White Pube have run a monthly Writers Grant to support early career working class writers.

In 2021, The White Pube wrote a manifesto for a fairer art world. It was displayed as a series called 'ideas for a new art world' and featured on billboards across London and Liverpool. It includes suggestions such as, "Universal Basic Income and affordable housing so that everyone, including artists, can make a living" and "Curators should ask the public to see what they think galleries and museums should be used for" and "dear museums, give back all stolen objects", among others.

In 2023, they were part of the jury for the John Moores Painting Prize along with Alexis Harding, Chila Kumari Singh Burman, Marlene Smith and Yu Hong.

Their novel Poor Artists was released in October 2024. It was shortlisted for the Gordon Burn Prize 2025 and highly commended by the judges for its innovative style.

== Bibliography ==
- Ideas for a New Art World. Rough Trade Books. 2021. ISBN 978-1-914236-07-5.
- Chaotic Nightclub Photos: The Review. Rough Trade Books. 2023. ISBN 978-1-914236-33-4.
- Poor Artists. Penguin Books. 2024. ISBN 978-0-241-63376-2.
