= Avinash Chandra =

British painter

- Born: 28 August 1931; Shimla, India
- Died: 15 September 1991 (aged 60)
- Occupation: Painter

Avinash Chandra (28 August 1931 – 15 September 1991) was an Indian painter, who lived and worked in the United Kingdom.

== Early life and education ==
Avinash Chandra was born on 28 August 1931 in Shimla, India, and was brought up there and in Delhi. His father was the manager of the Cecil hotel in Delhi. His family wanted him to study engineering and for the first six months after enrolling at Delhi Polytechnic Art School, his family did not know he was studying art.

Chandra graduated in 1951 with a first class degree in Fine Art and joined the faculty staff. His students include Paramjit Singh, Arpita Singh and Gopi Gajwani. His 1955 "Snow in Pahalgam" sold for INR 4,375,000.

He moved to Golders Green, London, in 1956, with his first wife, artist Prem Lata Chandra who had been awarded a scholarship to study at the Central School of Art.

== Awards and recognition ==
Chandra won first prize at the First National Art Exhibition of Art, in New Delhi, in 1954 and the gold medal Prix Européen in 1962.

In 1962 he was featured in a BBC Monitor documentary, presented by W.G. Archer, and in 2018 in the BBC documentary Whoever Heard of a Black Artist?.

A solo exhibition was held at the Hamilton Galleries in London in 1965. His murals in glass survive in Alexander House, created for the Anglo-Dutch Cigar Company in Finchley (1963) and for the Pilkington Brothers Glass company in St Helens, Merseyside.

His work was also exhibited as part of The Other Story: Afro-Asian artists in post-war Britain at the Hayward Gallery in 1989; and is in collections including those of the Arts Council of Great Britain, Ashmolean Museum, Kettle's Yard, Durham University, Leicestershire County Council, Musée National d'Art Moderne, Museum of Modern Art (Berlin), Museum of Modern Art (Haifa), National Gallery of Modern Art, the National Trust for England, New York University, Punjab Museum, Tate, and the Victoria and Albert Museum.

== Solo exhibitions ==
1987 Avinash Chandra, Horizon Gallery, London.

== Group exhibitions ==
1987 The Other Story, Hayward Gallery, London.

== Reviews, articles, texts, etc. ==
- Rasheed Araeen, 'Conversation with Avinash Chandra', Third Text, no.3/4, (Spring - Summer 1988), 69–95.

- 'Avinash Chandra', Third Text, no.16/17, (Autumn - Winter), 3–4.

- James Burr, 'Obituary', Apollo, no.135, (January 1992), 54.

== Personal life ==
He married artist Prem Lata in India, and they moved to the UK in 1956. They had a daughter, Alita in London in 1964. The marriage broke down through domestic violence and Prem Chandra took her daughter back to her family in India, before committing suicide in 1975, after which her mother raised her daughter.

Chandra married his second wife Valerie Murray, a British actress of Jamaican heritage, in 1977.

He died in London on 15 September 1991.
