= Keith Piper (artist) =

British artist (born 1960)

- Born: 1960 (age 65–66); Crown Colony of Malta
- Education: Trent Polytechnic; Royal College of Art
- Known for: BLK Art Group
- Website: http://www.keithpiper.info/

Keith Piper (born 1960) is a British artist, curator, critic and academic. He was a founder member of the groundbreaking BLK Art Group, an association of black British art students, mostly based in the West Midlands region of the UK.

== Early life and education ==
Piper was born in the Crown Colony of Malta to a working-class family of African-Caribbean heritage: his father, originally from Antigua, had gone to England in the 1950s, settled in Birmingham in the West Midlands, and been posted on Malta's military base just before Piper's birth. Six months old when he arrived in Britain, Piper was raised in and around Birmingham. He was first attracted to art as a response to the industrialised, decaying landscape of his youth. Quoted in his monograph Relocating the Remains (1997), he recalls being "interested in the aesthetics of peeling paint, rust and dereliction and the multi-layered look of fly posters when they become torn off". Piper went on to attend Trent Polytechnic, where he gained his B.A.(Hons) degree in Fine Art in 1983, before graduating with a master's degree in Environmental Media at the Royal College of Art in London.

== Career and works ==
The Black Assassin Saints (1982), Acrylic on stitched unstretched canvas.

Although Piper’s early and student work made use of traditional fine art media such as paint and canvas (as in The Body Politic, 1983), from the late 1980s he became primarily associated with technically innovative work that explored multi-media elements such as computer software, websites, tape/slide, sound and video within an installation-based practice.

Piper first came to public attention when, in 1982, while still a student, he joined Eddie Chambers, the late Donald Rodney and Marlene Smith in what came to be known as the BLK Art Group. Their politically forthright exhibition The Pan-Afrikan Connection garnered media attention as it toured to Trent Polytechnic in Nottingham; King Street Gallery in Bristol; and The Africa Centre in London. In 1983-84 a second touring exhibition, The BLK Art Group, was held at the Herbert Art Gallery in Coventry, Battersea Arts Centre in London and, again, the Africa Centre.

However, the group's critique of institutional racism in and beyond Britain's art world became a part of the impetus that led to The Other Story, a seminal survey of African and Asian artists at London's Hayward Gallery in 1989 as well as the founding of the Association of Black Photographers and the establishment of Iniva, the Institute of International Visual Arts – some of which have exhibited Piper's work. His photography was recognised in the 1992 survey by Ten.8 magazine.

Piper continued to practise throughout the 1990s, 2000s and 2010s, exhibiting work in prestigious galleries and museums around the world, including, in 1999, the New Museum of Contemporary Art in New York, in 2007, the Victoria and Albert Museum, and, in 2012, Migrations at Tate Britain. In 1998, Piper, along with Ramona Ramlochand collaborated on an exhibition called The Night Has A Thousand Eyes at the Ottawa Art Gallery. It included a collaborative installation between the two as well as their own separate ones.

Examples of Piper's work are held in numerous public collections, including the Arts Council Collection Tate and the Manchester Art Gallery. His 'Untitled' (1986) painting acquired by Manchester Art Gallery was re-interpreted in 2022 for display as a central work in their Climate Justice Gallery.

In 2002, Keith Piper was awarded an honorary Doctorate of Arts at Wolverhampton University and has taught for several years as a Reader in Fine Art at London's Middlesex University.

In 2015–16, Piper's work (You Are Now Entering) Mau Mau Country (1983) was featured in the six-month exhibition No Colour Bar: Black British Art in Action 1960–1990 held at the City of London's Guildhall Art Gallery.

In 2017, Iniva, presented a solo exhibition of Piper's work at Bluecoat, Liverpool. Entitled Unearthing the Bankers Bones, it featured large-scale painting, installation and digital works that address anxieties about the impacts of globalisation. Lending its title to the exhibition, the centrepiece of the show is a 70th Anniversary Commission for the Arts Council Collection with Iniva and Bluecoat, consisting of three synchronised high definition video projections, which depict a narrative of economic and social collapse. This was Piper's first monographic show since the retrospective Relocating the Remains, produced by Iniva in 1997.

The retrospective Body Politics – Work from 1982–2007 was shown from October to December 2019 in Wolverhampton Art Gallery.

In 2022, Piper created the exhibition Jet Black Futures which was presented at the New Art Gallery in Walsall from January 12-April 24. It was "a set of mixed-media digital montages printed onto white material and intended to serve as protest banners."

Viva Voce, a site-specific commission for the Rex Whistler Room at Tate Britain, opened in 2024.

== Multimedia installations and project ==
- Viva Voce, 2024 - The Rex Whistler Room, Tate Britain
- A Fictional Tourist in Europe, 2001
- The Mechanoid's Bloodline, 2001
- The Exploded City, 1998
- Four Frontiers, 1998
- Message Carrier, 1998
- Robot Bodies, 1998
- Relocating the Remains, 1997
- The Fictions of Science, 1996
- Four Corners, A Contest of Opposites, 1995
- Reckless Eyeballing, 1995
- Terrible Spaces, 1994
- Exotic Signs, 1993
- Transgressive Acts, 1993
- Another Step into the Arena, 1992
- Tagging the Other, 1992
- Trade Winds, 1992
- A Ship Called Jesus, 1991
- Step into the Arena, 1991
- The Devil Finds Work, 1990
- Chanting Heads, 1988
- Diaspora Wallchart, 1987
