= Tam Joseph =

Dominica-born British painter (born 1947)

- Born: Thomas Joseph; 1947 (age 78–79); Charlotte Ville, Dominica
- Other name: Tom Joseph
- Education: Central School of Art and Design; Slade School of Art, University of London
- Notable work: Spirit of the Carnival; UK School Report
- Website: www.tamjosephartlive.com

Tam Joseph (born 1947) is a Dominica-born British painter, formerly known as Tom Joseph. Described as "a uniquely talented, multidimensional artist" by art historian Eddie Chambers, "Tam Joseph has contributed a number of memorable paintings that locate themselves at the centre of socio-political commentary, often making work that shocks as it amuses, amuses as it shocks. Typical in this regard are paintings for which Joseph is universally loved and respected, such as 'Spirit of the Carnival' and 'UK School Report'."

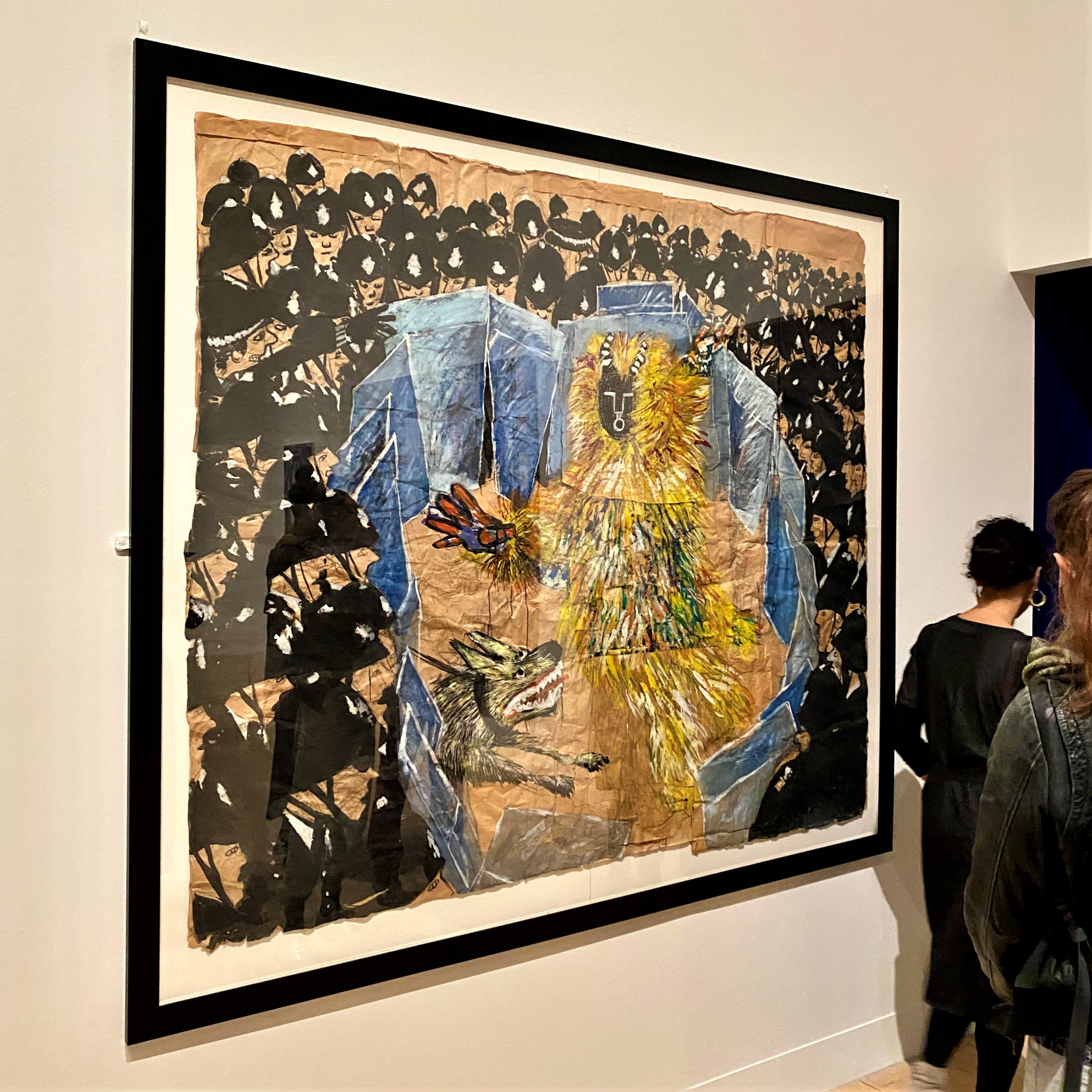
Installation view of Joseph's Spirit of the Carnival, November 2021, Tate Britain

== Biography ==
Born in the Commonwealth of Dominica, Joseph came at the age of eight to London, where he still lives and works. He has been quoted as saying: "I am Windrush.... I didn't experience growing up as a Black child in England."

In 1967, he studied at the Central School of Art and Design, following this with a BA course at the Slade School of Art, University of London. He worked on Yellow Submarine, the 1968 animated film featuring the Beatles. He travelled in Europe and the Far East during the 1970s, and subsequently enrolled at the London College of Printing, graduating with a Dip AD in Typographic design. While working for the magazine Africa Journal in the late 1970s and early 1980s, he also travelled extensively in Africa. In 1979, he illustrated Buchi Emecheta's children's book Titch the Cat, published by Allison and Busby.

According to InIVA (the Institute of International Visual Art), "Joseph's work is often figurative and centred on the themes of reality, or rather the surreality, of life in the city."

In the documentary film Tam Joseph; Work in Progress, he talks about his start as a painter and how he enjoys using tools he himself has made. This film was made over a period spanning seven years (2011–2017) and includes his work in sculpture, painting and graphic design.

He recognises Pablo Picasso as one of his main references in sculpture and admires how he was capable of looking at things and offering a new interpretation of them.

One of Joseph's best known paintings is his 1983 work Spirit of the Carnival (a reference to the Notting Hill Carnival), described by Time Out as a "jaw-dropping image of a carnival masquerader being kettled by the police". Another notable work, dating from 1983, is UK School Report, which depicts the passage of a Black youth through the British education system in three portraits that are captioned: "Good at sports", "Likes music" and "Needs surveillance".

His exhibitions have included: Caribbean Art at the Crossroads, El Museo del Barrio, Studio Museum in Harlem and Queens Museum, 2012; This is History, Gallery II and touring, 1998; Learning to Walk, Smith Art Gallery and Museum, Stirling, and touring; Us and Dem, Storey Institute, Lancaster, 1994; Back to School, The Showroom, London, 1989; Black Art: Plotting the Course, Oldham Art Gallery and touring, 1988; Big Yellow, Bedford Hill Gallery, 1988; Observers are Worried, Painting and Sculpture, St Pancras Library and Shaw Theatre, London, 1986; Monkey Dey Chop, Baboon Dey Cry, Barbican Arts Centre, London, 1984. His work was included in the major group exhibition No Colour Bar: Black British Art in Action 1960–1990 at London's Guildhall Art Gallery (10 July 2015 – 24 January 2016).

Tate Britain's landmark exhibition Life Between Islands: Caribbean-British Art 1950s – Now (1 December 2021 – 3 April 2022), celebrating 70 years of Caribbean-British art, prominently featured Joseph's work Spirit of the Carnival.

The first major book providing an extensive survey of his work, Tam Joseph: I Know What I See, was published in September 2023 by Four Corners Books, featuring an introduction by Eddie Chambers. A review of the monograph states: "As the collected works in the book demonstrate, Joseph finds inspiration in multiple sources — from reflections on his own history and the history of injustices that African Caribbean people in Britain face to cinema, sport, and music. Besides social and political issues, the natural world is also among his chosen subjects, together with the history of painting itself. Knowledgeable about art from the past, Joseph creates pieces that reference historical genres and forms, inviting viewers to consider them anew."

== Selected group exhibitions ==
- 1984: Into the Open: New Paintings, Prints and Sculptures by Contemporary Black Artists, Mappin Art Gallery, Sheffield

–– Creation For Liberation 2nd Open Exhibition By Black Artists, Brixton Art Gallery, London

- 1985: Blackskin/Bluecoat, Bluecoat Gallery, Liverpool (4 April – 4 May 1985)
- 1986: From Two Worlds, Whitechapel Art Gallery, London (30 July – 7 September 1986)
- 1987: Double Vision, Cartwright Hall, Bradford

–– Prema Art Gallery, Gloucestershire, The Old Mill, Uley

- 1988: Black Art: Plotting the Course, Oldham Art Gallery

–– The Artist Abroad, Lincolnshire, Usher Gallery

- 1990: Steel by Design, Scunthorpe Museum
- 1992: Blast from the Past, Glasgow Art Museum

––The Minories, Colchester

- 1993: Greenwich Citizens Art Gallery
- 1994: Us n' Dem, Lancaster City Art Galleries
- 1995: ART'CRA, Accra, Ghana

–– Tricycle Theatre, London
–– Gallerie de la Salamandre, Nîmes

- 1997: Bradford, Museums and Art Galleries

–– Mappin Art Gallery, Sheffield

- 1998: Le Corps Humain, Gallerie des Arênes, Nîmes
- 1999: Tullie House Art Gallery, Carlisle
- 2000: Galerie HD Nick, Aubais
- 2006: Gallerie de L'Ombres, Nîmes
- 2007: Hawkins & Co, Elspeth Kyle Gallery, London
- 2008: Hawkins & Co, Novas Contemporary Urban Centre, Liverpool

–– Crossing the Waters, Cartwright Hall, Bradford

- 2009: The Tavern Gallery, Meldreth, Herts

–– Pic n'Mix, Woolworth, Leytonstone High Road, London

- 2010: Gallery 101, Mansion House, London
- 2012: Material Matters EastwingX, Courtauld Institute, London

–– Caribbean: Crossroads of the World, Queens Museum of Art New York; El Museo, New York; Studio Museum in Harlem

- 2013: 50 Years Post-Birmingham, The Art Gallery: University of Maryland College Park

–– Tehran Calling, London Print Workshop

- 2014: DAK'ART 2014, Senegal

–– Perez Museum of Art, Miami, Caribbean: Crossroads of the World
–– Tam Joseph: "Back in School", The Reading Room, London
–– "Where Do I End and You Begin?" Edinburgh Art Festival

- 2015: No Colour Bar: Black British Art in Action 1960–1990, Guildhall Art Gallery, London
- 2020: Evolution - Tam Joseph Paintings, Felix & Spear Gallery, London
- 2021–2022: Life Between Islands, Tate Britain

== See also ==
- BLK Art Group
