= Balraj Khanna =

Indian author and painter

- Born: 4 October 1939; Punjab, India
- Died: 19 January 2024 (aged 84)
- Occupations: Writer, painter and curator
- Website: www.balrajkhanna.com

Balraj Khanna (4 October 1939 – 19 January 2024) was an Indian artist, writer and curator. Born in Punjab, India, he lived in England and France since 1962.

== Bibliography ==
- The Punjab and the Punjabi Way of Life, Commonwealth Institute, 1976
- Nation of Fools, Michael Joseph Ltd, 1984
- Sweet Chillies, Constable, 1991
- Art of Modern India, Thames & Hudson Ltd, 1999
- Krishna: The Divine Lover, National Touring Exhibitions, 1999
- Human and Divine: 2000 Years of Indian Sculpture (with George Michell), National Touring Exhibitions, 1999
- Indian Magic, Hope Road Publishing Ltd, 2014
- Line of Blood, Palimpsest Publishers, 2017
