= Marlene Smith (artist) =

British artist and curator (born 1964)

- Born: 1964 (age 61–62); Birmingham, UK
- Education: Bradford College
- Occupations: Artist and curator
- Known for: BLK Art Group

Marlene Smith (born 1964) is a British artist and curator, who was a founding members of BLK Art Group in the 1980s.

== Education and career ==
Born in Birmingham, West Midlands, England, in 1964, Marlene Smith studied Art & Design at Bradford College (1983–87).

She is one of the founding members of the BLK Art Group in 1982. She was director of The Public in West Bromwich. She is UK Research Manager for Black Artists and Modernism, a collaborative research project run by the University of the Arts London and Middlesex University.

In 2023, she was part of the jury for the John Moores Painting Prize along with Alexis Harding, Chila Kumari Singh Burman, The White Pube and Yu Hong.

== Exhibitions ==
=== Selected solo exhibitions ===
- 1983–84: The Pan-Afrikan Connection
- 1985: The Thin Black Line, Institute of Contemporary Arts
- 1986: Unrecorded Truths, The Elbow Room
- 1986: Some of Us Are Brave, The Black-Art Gallery
