= Gavin Jantjes =

South African painter (born 1948)

Gavin Jantjes (born 1948 in District Six, Cape Town) is a South African painter, curator, writer and lecturer.

== Life ==
Jantjes attended the Michaelis School of Fine Art at the University of Cape Town from 1966 to 1969. He left apartheid South Africa in 1970 on a DAAD scholarship to study at the Hochschule für bildende Künste Hamburg between 1970 and 1972. He was a founding member of the German anti-apartheid movement. He was granted political asylum in Germany in 1973. He worked as a consultant visual campaign director for the United Nations High Commissioner for Refugees from 1978 to 1982. In 1979 he published the South African Colouring Book, which consisted of eleven collaged serigraphs exploring apartheid in the format of a child's coloring book.

He moved his studio to Wiltshire, England in 1982. In 1986 he was appointed a Senior Lecturer in Fine Art at Chelsea College of Arts, The London Institute. From 1986 to 1990 he was on the council of the Arts Council of Great Britain and was its consultant for the formation of the Institute of New International Visual Art (InIVA). He also served on the advisory board of the Tate Liverpool from 1992 until 1995, and was a trustee of London's Serpentine Gallery from 1995 until 1998.

He became artistic director of the Henie Onstad Kunstsenter, Hovikodden, near Oslo in 1998 and curated one person exhibitions there of Gordon Bennett, Yinka Shonibare, Susan Hiller, Marie-Jo Lafontaine, Shirin Neshat, Marlene Dumas and Carlos Capelan.

In 2004 he joined the National Museum of Art, Architecture and Design, Oslo, as its Senior Consultant for International Contemporary Exhibitions: he curated exhibitions there on Amar Kanwar, Harun Farocki and Nicholas Hlobo. He was also the Project Director of the Visual Century Project on 20th Century and contemporary South African resulting in the publication, Visual Century: South African Art in Context (2011).

He left the National Museum in 2014 and reopened his studio in Oslo in 2015. He continues to paint, moving between Cape Town, England and Oslo.

== Exhibitions ==
One man shows of work by Gavin Jantjes include:

- 1970 The Artists Gallery, Cape Town
- 1976 Institute of Contemporary Arts (ICA), London and Henie Onstad Art Centre, Hovikodden
- 1977 Provinciehuis, Groningen
- 1978 Kulturhuset, Stockholm
- 1979 Kunsterhaus Bethanien, Berlin
- 1980–3, 1986, 1990 Edward Totah Gallery, London
- 1984 Midland Group, Nottingham
- 1985 Black Art Gallery, London
- 1987 Blue Coat Gallery, Liverpool
- 1988 Herbert Museum and Art Gallery, Coventry
- 1989 City Museums and Art Gallery, Stoke-on-Trent
- 2024 Whitechapel Gallery, London

== Collections ==
Jantjes’ work in is the collections of Tate Britain, London; Victoria and Albert Museum, London; Arts Council Collection; Wolverhampton Art Gallery; Coventry City Museum; National Museum of African Art, Smithsonian Institution, Washington, D.C.

== Publications ==
A Fruitful Incoherence: Dialogues with Artists on Internationalism / [edited by Gavin Jantjes in association with Rohini Malik, Steve Bury and Gilane Tawadros] London: INIVA, 1998. ISBN 1899846131 WorldCat no. 39931382
