= Eddie Chambers (artist) =

Artist, curator and academic (born 1960)

- Born: 1960 (age 65–66); Wolverhampton, England
- Education: Sunderland Polytechnic (BA) in Fine Art; Goldsmiths College, University of London (Ph.D) in Art History
- Occupations: Art historian, curator and artist
- Known for: BLK Art Group
- Notable work: Things Done Change: The Cultural Politics of Recent Black Artists in Britain (2012)
- Website: https://www.eddiechambers.com/

Eddie Chambers (born 1960) is a British contemporary art historian, curator and artist. He currently holds the David Bruton, Jr. Centennial Professorship in Art History at the University of Texas at Austin.

== Artistic career ==
Chambers was born in Wolverhampton, England, to parents who were immigrants from Jamaica. While attending Sunderland Polytechnic where he was pursuing a Fine Art degree, Chambers met Trent Polytechnic student Keith Piper. Alongside Marlene Smith and Donald Rodney, they formed the BLK Art Group, a groundbreaking association of Black British art students. The group's highly politicized work, including Chambers' Destruction of the National Front (now in the Tate Gallery collection), was part of a controversial 1989 touring exhibition entitled "The Other Story: Asian, African and Caribbean artists in Post-War Britain". The exhibition challenged imperialist attitudes toward race and nationalism, and attracted wide press attention and critical interest.

More recently, Chambers' work was featured in the exhibition No Colour Bar: Black British Art in Action 1960–1990 at the Guildhall Art Gallery (10 July 2015 – 24 January 2016). When the exhibition began, he and Errol Lloyd held a Q&A session at Guildhall to discuss "the impact made by notable Black Artists in the late 20th Century, who have gone largely unnoticed in the British Art Arena."

== Curating ==
In addition to his own artistic work, Chambers has continued to champion the work of other artists, curating exhibitions throughout the UK and internationally, including Black People and the British Flag, Eugene Palmer, Frank Bowling: Bowling on through the Century and Tam Joseph: This is History. In 1998 he was awarded a Ph.D in History of Art from Goldsmiths College, University of London, for his thesis "Black Visual Arts Activity in England Between 1981–1986: Press and Public Responses". Concerned about the need to document the practice of black artists, Chambers set up the African and Asian Visual Artists' Archive (AAVAA) in 1989. It was the first research and reference facility in the country for documenting British-based Black visual artists. Drawing on material in his own collection relating to the visual arts practices of artists from African, South Asian and other diasporas, he also initiated the online research and reference facility, Diaspora Artists.

== Writing ==
In the 21st century, Chambers moved into the world of academia and art scholarship, contributing catalogue essays, anthology entries, articles and books with a focus on the work and history of Black British and African artists. After relocating to the United States, he joined the Department of Art and Art History at the University of Texas, Austin in 2010, where he taught the history of African Diaspora art. He also wrote his first substantial work of contemporary art history, Things Done Change: The Cultural Politics of Recent Black Artists in Britain (2012). It garnered enthusiastic responses in leading journals, including Art Review, which described his writing as "excellent" and "nuanced". In 2014, he published an expanded consideration of his themes in Black Artists in British Art: A History from 1950 to the Present.

== Selected bibliography ==
=== Books ===
- Run Through the Jungle. Iniva. 1999. ISBN 978-1899846207.
- Things Done Change: The Cultural Politics of Recent Black Artists in Britain. Editions Rodopi B.V. 2012. ISBN 978-9042034433.
- Black Artists in British Art: A History from 1950 to the Present. I.B.Tauris. 2014. ISBN 978-1780762715.
- Roots & Culture: Cultural Politics in the making of Black Britain. Bloomsbury, 2017. ISBN 978-1784536169
- The Routledge Companion to African American Art History. Routledge. 2019. ISBN 978-1138486553

=== Book contributions ===
- Entries on Frank Bowling, Lubaina Himid and Tam Joseph in Guide to Black Artists, 1997, St James Press, in association with the Schomburg Center for Research in Black Culture.
- Hylton, Richard, ed. (2003). Donald Rodney: Doublethink. London: Autograph. ISBN 978-1899282906. Includes an essay by Chambers, "The Art of Donald Rodney".
- Entry on Art and Artists, British-Caribbean, in Britain and the Americas: Culture, Politics, and History, California: ABC-CLIO, 2005. ISBN 1851094318; ISBN 978-1851094318
- "Black Visual Arts Activity in the 1980s", in The History of British Art: 1870 – Now, Tate Publishing, 2008. ISBN 1854376527; ISBN 978-1854376527

=== Articles ===
- Chambers, Eddie (July 2013). "Reading the Riot Act". Visual Culture in Britain. 14 (2): 238–256. doi:10.1080/14714787.2013.782156. S2CID 144482293. Subject: Artists' work about riots.
- "Brits in the Bronx". Art Monthly, 214, March 1998.
