= Katherine Ross =

Katherine Ross and variants may refer to:

- Catherine L. Ross, American educator
- Catherine Sheldrick Ross (1945–2021), Canadian professor and dean
- Catherine Ross (Museumand) (born 1951), founder of Museumand, a UK museum of Caribbean heritage
- A. Catharine Ross, professor of nutrition and physiology
- Catherine J. Ross (born 1949), professor of law
- Kate Ross (1956–1998), American author
- Katharine Ross (born 1940), American actress
- Katherine Ross Queen (1885–1934), Scottish-born Canadian social activist
- Katherine Ross (scientist), British marine biologist
- Katherine Ross (died 1697), Scottish Covenanter, memoirist and schoolmistress
- Kathryn Ross (rower) (born 1981), Australian Paralympic rower
- Kathryn Ross (writer) (born 1966), British writer

== See also ==
- Cathy Ross (disambiguation)
- Kathleen Ross, founding president of Heritage University
