= British African-Caribbean people =

British ethnic group

British Black-Caribbean people
- Distribution by local authority in the 2011 census

Total population
- United Kingdom: 628,296 – 0.9% (2021/22 Census); England: 619,419 – 1.1% (2021); Scotland: 2,214 – 0.04% (2022) (Note: Only includes those who identified as 'Caribbean or Black: Caribbean, Caribbean Scottish or Caribbean British', does not include those who identified as 'Caribbean or Black: Other Caribbean or Black' which numbered 4,018. If combined together, this adds up to 6,232 (0.1%).); Wales: 3,700 – 0.1% (2021); Northern Ireland: 2,963 – 0.2% (2021) (Note: Includes all those who identified as 'Black Other' i.e. not 'Black African' which numbered 8,069)

Regions with significant populations
- London; Birmingham; Manchester; Wolverhampton; Nottingham; Luton; Leeds; Bristol

Languages
- British English · Caribbean English

Religion
- Predominantly Christianity (69.1%); minority follows other faiths (2.7%) (Note: Including Islam (1.2%), Buddhism (0.2%), Hinduism (0.1%), Judaism (0.1%), Sikhism (0.02%), Rastafari and others) or are irreligious (18.6%); 2021 census, England and Wales only

Related ethnic groups
- African diaspora · African-Caribbean · Bahamian British · British Jamaicans · Guyanese British · Barbadian British · Grenadian British · Montserratian British · Trinidadian and Tobagonian British · Antiguan British

British African-Caribbean people or British Afro-Caribbean people are an ethnic group in the United Kingdom. They are British citizens or residents of recent Caribbean heritage who further trace much of their ancestry to West and Central Africa. This includes multi-racial Afro-Caribbean people.

The earliest generations of Afro-Caribbean people to migrate to Britain trace their ancestry to a wide range of Afro-Caribbean ethnic groups, who themselves descend from the disparate African ethnic groups transported to the colonial Caribbean as part of the trans-Atlantic slave trade. British African Caribbeans may also have ancestry from European and Asian settlers, as well as from various Indigenous peoples of the Caribbean. The population includes those with origins in Jamaica, Trinidad and Tobago, The Bahamas, Saint Kitts and Nevis, Barbados, Grenada, Antigua and Barbuda, Saint Lucia, Dominica, Montserrat, British Virgin Islands, Turks and Caicos Islands, Cayman Islands, Anguilla, Saint Vincent and the Grenadines, Guyana, Belize, and elsewhere.

Since the mid-18th century, small numbers of Afro-Caribbeans reached port cities across England and Wales, often serving as sailors or in shipping. But the most significant wave of migration came after World War II, coinciding with the decolonisation era and the dissolution of the British Empire. The governments of the United Kingdom, France, and the Netherlands promoted immigration to address domestic labour shortages. Known as the Windrush generation, Afro-Caribbeans arrived as citizens of the United Kingdom and Colonies (CUKCs) in the 1950s and 1960s, owing to birth in the former British colonies of the Caribbean. Those who settled in the UK prior to 1973 were granted either right of abode or indefinite leave to remain by the Immigration Act 1971. But a series of governmental policies in the 2000s and 2010s erroneously treated some as unlawfully residing in the UK. This subsequently became known as the Windrush scandal.

In the 21st century, Afro-Caribbean communities are present throughout the United Kingdom's major cities. As there is no specific UK census category which comprehensively covers the community, population numbers remain somewhat ambiguous. According to the 2011 United Kingdom census, 594,825 Britons identified as "Black Caribbean" and 426,715 identified as "Mixed: White and Black Caribbean". Categories for other Caribbean heritages also exist. Due to the complexities within African Caribbean peoplehood, some of those with a parent or grandparent of African-Caribbean ancestry may identify with, or be perceived as, white people in the United Kingdom. (Note: See:)

== Terminology ==
The Journal of Epidemiology and Community Health published a glossary in which it suggests a definition of Afro-Caribbean or African Caribbean as: "A person of African descent whose ancestors were forcibly brought from West and Central Africa to the Caribbean during the transatlantic slave trade, and who identifies, or is identified, as Afro-Caribbean (in terms of racial classifications, this population approximates to the group known as Negroid or similar terms)." A survey of terms used to describe people of African descent in medical research notes: "The term African Caribbean/Afro-Caribbean when used in Europe and North America usually refers to people with African ancestral origins who migrated via the Caribbean islands." It suggests that use of the term in the UK is inconsistent, with some researchers using it to describe people of both Black and Caribbean descent, whereas others use it to refer to those of either West African or Caribbean background.

The British Sociological Association's guidelines on ethnicity and race state: "African-Caribbean has replaced the term Afro-Caribbean to refer to Caribbean peoples and those of Caribbean origin who are of African descent. There is now a view that the term should not be hyphenated and that indeed, the differences between such groups mean the people of African and Caribbean origins should be referred to separately." The Guardian and Observer style guide prescribes the use of "African-Caribbean" for use in the two newspapers, specifically noting "not Afro-Caribbean".

Sociologist Peter J. Aspinall argues that the term Black has gained increased currency among people of African and Caribbean origin in the UK. He notes that in a 1992 health survey, 17 per cent of 722 African Caribbeans surveyed, including 36 per cent of those aged 16 to 29, described themselves as "Black British". He suggests this "appears to be a pragmatic and spontaneous (rather than politically led) response to the wish to describe an allegiance to a 'British' identity and the diminishing importance of ties with a homeland in the Caribbean".

=== Census ===
The Office for National Statistics does not use a singular "ethnic group" category to comprehensively describe or encompass persons who are part of, or identified with, the African-Caribbean community in the United Kingdom. The "Black Caribbean" category had the highest recorded population figures associated with African Caribbean heritage in the 2011 and 2021 United Kingdom censuses. "Black Caribbean" is under a "Black or Black British" heading in the census. "Mixed: White and Black Caribbean" also had a significant recorded population within the country, denoting unquantified partial African Caribbean and "White" ancestry. This ethnic group category was listed under a "Mixed" heading in the census.

Other "Mixed" subcategories which identify some form of Caribbean descent are "Mixed: Caribbean Asian" and "Mixed: White Caribbean". Outside of censuses, there are notable examples of people with African Caribbean ancestry (often via a grandparent or great-grandparent) who are perceived as, or identify as, white people in the United Kingdom. (Note: See:)

== Demographics ==
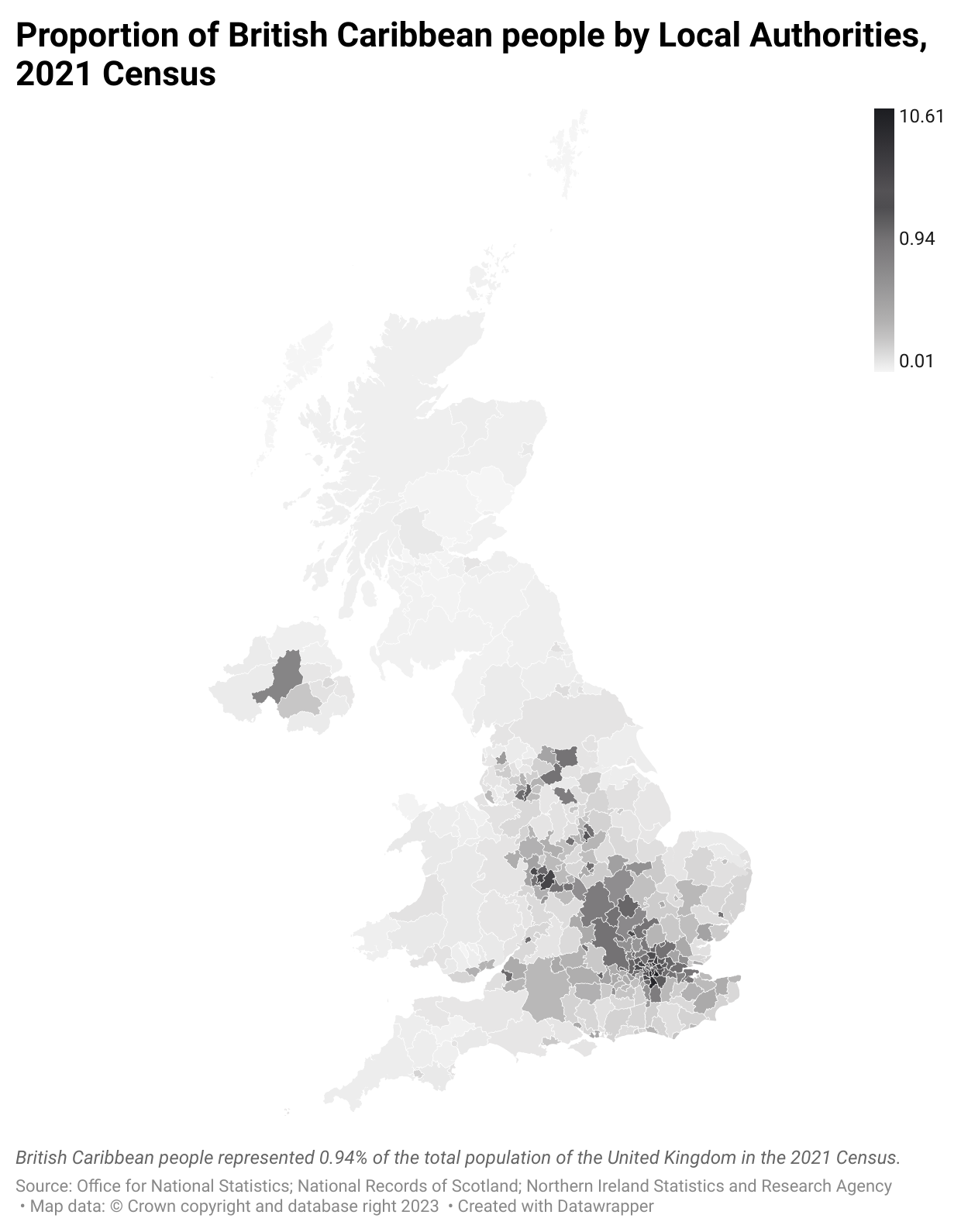
Distribution of Black Caribbeans by local authority, 2021 census

Black or Black British Afro-Caribbeans as a population pyramid in 2021 (in England and Wales)

In the 2021 Census of England and Wales, 623,115 people classified themselves as "Black Caribbean", amounting to 1 per cent of the total population. In the 2011 Census of England and Wales, 594,825 individuals specified their ethnicity as "Caribbean" under the "Black/African/Caribbean/Black British" heading, and 426,715 as "White and Black Caribbean" under the "Mixed/multiple ethnic group" heading. In Scotland, 3,430 people classified themselves as "Caribbean, Caribbean Scottish or Caribbean British" and 730 as "Other Caribbean or Black" under the broader "Caribbean or Black" heading. In Northern Ireland, 372 people specified their ethnicity as "Caribbean". The published results for the "Mixed" category are not broken down into sub-categories for Scotland and Northern Ireland as they are for England and Wales.

In the UK Census of 2001, 565,876 people classified themselves in the category "Black Caribbean", amounting to around 1 per cent of the total population. Of the "minority ethnic" population, which amounted to 7.9 per cent of the total UK population, Black Caribbean people accounted for 12.2 per cent. In addition, 14.6 per cent of the minority ethnic population (equivalent to 1.2 per cent of the total population) identified as mixed race, of whom around one third stated that they were of mixed Black Caribbean and White descent.

=== Birthplace ===
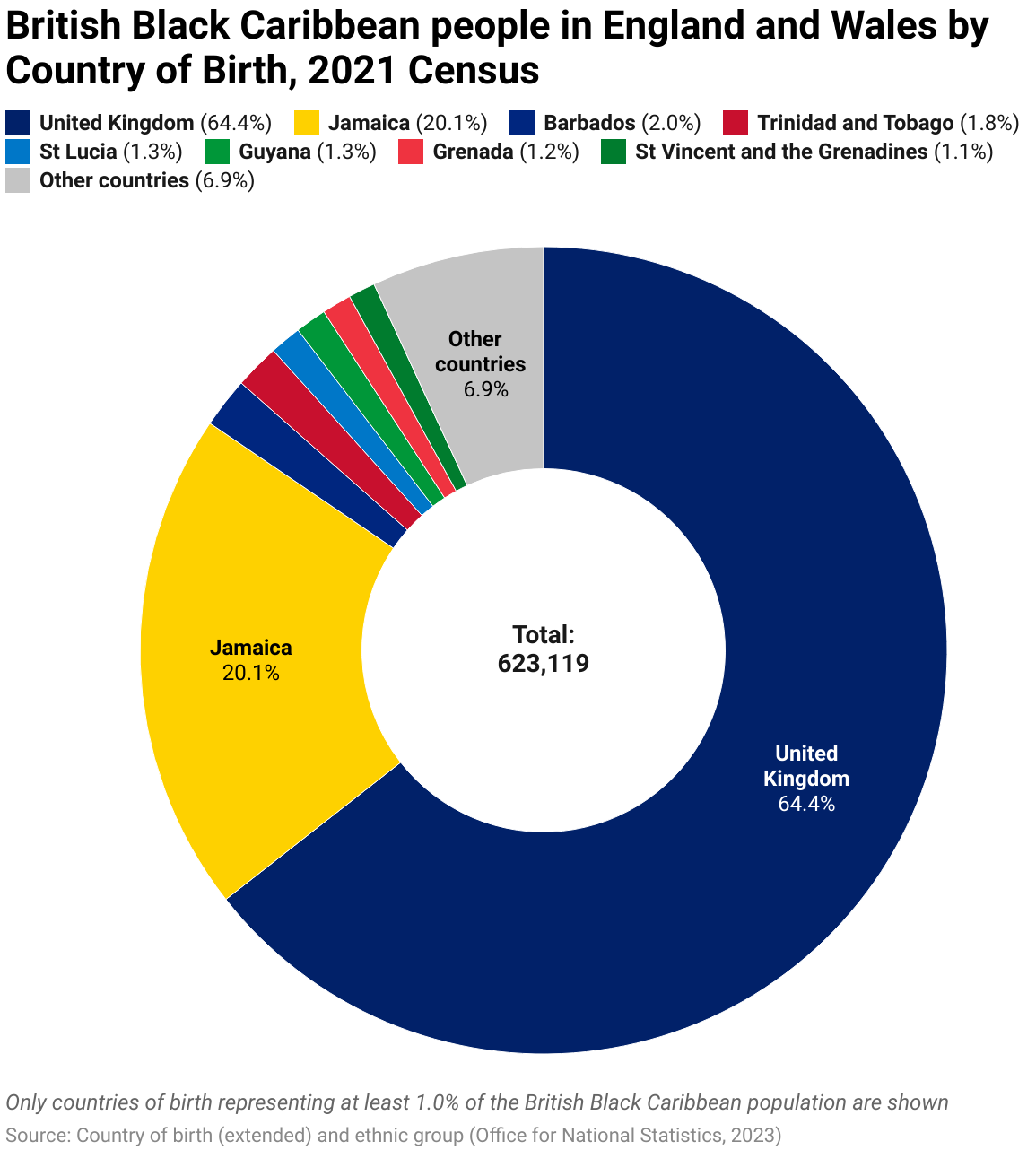
Country of birth (2021 census, England and Wales)

Year of arrival (2021 census, England and Wales)
1. Born in the UK (64.4%)
2. Before 1950 (0.10%)
3. 1951 to 1960 (4.40%)
4. 1961 to 1970 (10.2%)
5. 1971 to 1980 (2.00%)
6. 1981 to 1990 (1.70%)
7. 1991 to 2000 (5.60%)
8. 2001 to 2010 (6.40%)
9. 2011 to 2021 (5.10%)

The Census also records respondents' countries of birth and the 2001 Census recorded 146,401 people born in Jamaica, 21,601 from Barbados, 21,283 from Trinidad and Tobago, 20,872 from Guyana, 9,783 from Grenada, 8,265 from Saint Lucia, 7,983 from Montserrat, 7,091 from Saint Vincent and the Grenadines, 6,739 from Dominica, 6,519 from Saint Kitts and Nevis, 3,891 from Antigua and Barbuda and 498 from Anguilla.

Detailed country-of-birth data from the 2011 Census is published separately for England and Wales, Scotland and Northern Ireland. In England and Wales, 160,095 residents reported their country of birth as Jamaica, 22,872 Trinidad and Tobago, 18,672 Barbados, 9,274 Grenada, 9,096 St Lucia, 7,390 St Vincent and the Grenadines, 7,270 Montserrat, 6,359 Dominica, 5,629 St Kitts and Nevis, 3,697 Antigua and Barbuda, 2,355 Cuba, 1,812 The Bahamas and 1,303 Dominican Republic. 8,301 people reported being born elsewhere in the Caribbean, bringing the total Caribbean-born population of England and Wales to 264,125. Of this number, 262,092 were resident in England and 2,033 in Wales. In Scotland, 2,054 Caribbean-born residents were recorded, and in Northern Ireland 314. Guyana is categorised as part of South America in the Census results, which show that 21,417 residents of England and Wales, 350 of Scotland and 56 of Northern Ireland were born in Guyana. Belize is categorised as part of Central America. 1,252 people born in Belize were recorded living in England and Wales, 79 in Scotland and 22 in Northern Ireland.

Based on a variety of official sources and extrapolating from figures for England alone, Ceri Peach estimated that the number of people in Britain born in the West Indies grew from 15,000 in 1951, to 172,000 in 1961 and 304,000 in 1971, and then fell slightly to 295,000 in 1981. He estimates the population of West Indian ethnicity in 1981 to be between 500,000 and 550,000.

=== Education ===
Black Caribbeans are more likely than White Britons to have formal qualifications. In 2001, around 29% of White Britons had no qualifications, compared to 27% for Black Caribbeans. In 2011, 24% of White British had no qualifications, higher than the national average of 23%, compared to 20% for Black Caribbeans.

Throughout the 1950s and 1960s, a disproportionate number of Caribbean migrant children were (often wrongly) classified as "educationally subnormal" and placed in special schools and units. By the end of the 1980s, the chances of white school leavers finding employment were four times better than those of black pupils. In 2000–01, black pupils were three times more likely than white pupils and ten times more likely than Indian pupils to be officially excluded from school for disciplinary reasons.

In 2004, 23.2 percent of Black Caribbean pupils in England achieved five or more GCSEs or equivalent at grades A* to C including English and mathematics, compared with 41.6 percent of White British pupils and 40.9 percent of all pupils regardless of ethnicity. In 2013, the equivalent figures were 53.3 percent for Black Caribbean pupils, 60.5 percent for White British pupils and 60.6 percent overall. Amongst pupils eligible for free school meals (used as a measure of low family incomes), Black Caribbean pupils outperformed White British pupils by 36.9 to 27.9 percent for boys and 47.7 to 36.8 percent for girls in 2013. A report published by the Department for Education in 2015 notes that "Black Caribbean and Mixed White & Black Caribbean students have...shown very strong improvement, from being half as likely [as] White British students to achieve the benchmarks of educational success in the early 2000s to near parity in 2013, although stubborn gaps do remain".

Black Caribbean pupils have a higher university entry rate than White British students.

=== Socio-economics ===
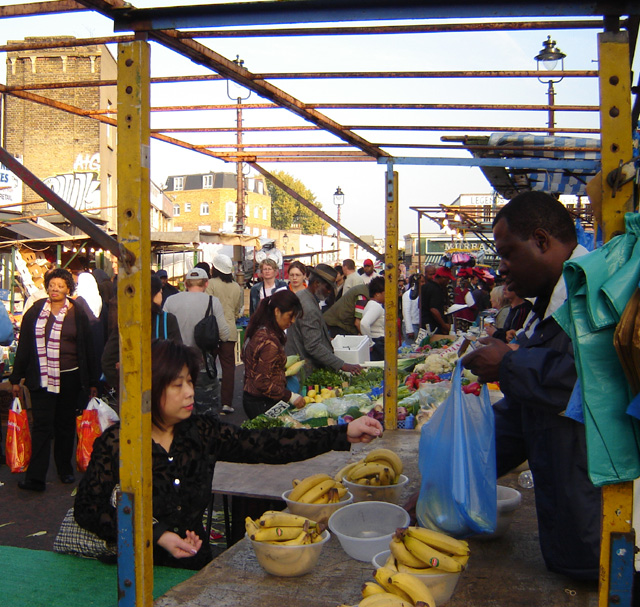
Ridley Road Market in Dalston, London, which sells African-Caribbean music, textiles, and food including goat meat, yams, mangos and spices.

According to data based on the 2011 Census, 40.7% of Black Caribbeans placed in the top 3 socio-economic groups (higher/lower managerial, professional and intermediate). This ranked as the fifth highest combined percentage out of the 18 ethnicities featured.

In terms of occupational class, research by Professor Yaojun Li finds that second-generation Black Caribbean men (i.e. those born in the UK or arrived before the age of 13) are more or less on par with White British men, while Black Caribbean women had a higher occupational class than White British women from the 1970s to the 1990s. Second-generation Black Caribbean women have now surpassed White British women. Further research by Dr Richard Norrie of Civitas noted a growing Black middle class, with around 35.7% of Black Caribbean men in "middle class" jobs in 2020 (compared to only 7% in the 1970s/1980s). The corresponding 2020 figure for White British men is 35.8%. The report claims that this convergence is "testimony to the accomplishments of black Caribbean men, as well as the openness of British economic life".

In 2007, a study by the Joseph Rowntree Foundation found that Black Caribbeans had one of the lowest poverty rates among the different main ethnic minority groups in Britain. Of the largest non-white ethnic minority groups, Bangladeshis (65%), Pakistanis (55%) and Black Africans (45%) had the highest poverty rates. Black Caribbeans (30%) and Indians (25%) had the lowest rates. For families where at least one adult was in paid work, Black Caribbeans and Indians again had the lowest poverty rates of 10-15%, compared to around 60% for Bangladeshis, 40% for Pakistanis and 30% for Black Africans. In 2011, a further comparison found that Black Caribbeans (with British Chinese and Indians) had lower child and adult poverty rates than Bangladeshis, Pakistanis and Black Africans.

White Britons tend to have the highest net wealth. Estimates of Black Caribbean wealth vary, according to source. A 2020 report by the Resolution Foundation found Black Caribbeans have a median net family wealth per adult of £120,000 (higher than Chinese, Black African, Bangladeshi, Pakistani and Other White), placing them in third place out of the major ethnic groups in the UK. A Civitas study similarly found that Black Caribbeans have an individual median wealth of £85,000, also ranked them third:

Ethnic group	Individual median wealth
White British	£166,700
Indian	£144,400
Black Caribbean	£85,000
Chinese	£67,300
White Other	£53,200
Pakistani	£52,000
Bangladeshi	£22,800
Black African	£18,100

Between 1972-2020, of the largest ethnic minority groups in Britain, Black Caribbeans (and Indians) had the highest employment rates overall. For much of the 1970s, Black Caribbeans had the highest employment rates - even higher than the White ethnic group.

Between 2004-2008 and 2013-2014, Black Caribbeans earned more than their White British counterparts. In 2015, the Equality and Human Rights Commission conducted research into ethnic minority pay gaps between 1993-2014. The report found that UK born Black Caribbean men had closed much of the pay gap to White British males, while UK born Black Caribbean women consistently out-earned White British women.

In 2019, Black Caribbeans had a higher hourly median wage than Pakistanis, Bangladeshis, Black Africans, White other and the other Asian ethnic group. Black Caribbean women continued to earn more on average than White British women.

=== Population distribution ===
Black Caribbean population by region and country
Region / Country	Population	Per cent of region
England	619,419	1.10%
Greater London	345,405	3.93%
West Midlands	90,192	1.52%
South East	43,523	0.47%
East of England	41,884	0.66%
East Midlands	30,828	0.63%
North West	25,919	0.35%
Yorkshire and The Humber	22,736	0.41%
South West	17,226	0.30%
North East	1,704	0.06%
Wales	3,700	0.12%
Northern Ireland (Note: Includes all those who identified as 'Black Other' i.e. not 'Black African' which numbered 8,069)	2,963	0.16%
Scotland (Note: Scotland held its census a year later after England and Wales due to the COVID-19 pandemic. As a result, the data shown is from 2022 as opposed to 2021.) (Note: Only includes those who identified as 'Caribbean or Black: Caribbean, Caribbean Scottish or Caribbean British', does not include those who identified as 'Caribbean or Black: Other Caribbean or Black' which numbered 4,018. If combined together, this adds up to 6,232 (0.1%).)	2,214	0.04%
Figures based on the 2021 United Kingdom Census

According to the 2021 United Kingdom census, the ten local authorities with the largest proportion of Black Caribbean people were largely concentrated in Greater London: Lewisham (10.61%), Croydon (9.24%), Lambeth (9.13%), Hackney (6.91%), Waltham Forest (6.32%), Brent (6.26%), Haringey (6.18%), Southwark (5.90%), Enfield (5.15%) and Birmingham (3.91%). In Wales, the highest proportion was in Cardiff at 0.37%.

In the 2011 Census, the greatest concentration of 'Black Caribbean' people is found in London, where 344,597 residents classified themselves as Black Caribbean, accounting for 4.2 per cent of the city's population. Other significant concentrations were (not in order) Birmingham, Manchester, Bradford, Nottingham, Coventry, Wolverhampton, Luton, Watford, Slough, Leicester, Bristol, Gloucester, Leeds, Huddersfield, Sheffield, Liverpool and Cardiff. In these cities, the community is traditionally associated with a particular area, such as Brixton, Harlesden, Stonebridge, Hackney, Lewisham, Tottenham, Croydon and Peckham in London, West Bowling and Heaton in Bradford, Chapeltown in Leeds, St. Pauls in Bristol, Handsworth, Aston and Ladywood in Birmingham, Moss Side in Manchester, St Ann's in Nottingham, Pitsmoor in Sheffield and Toxteth in Liverpool. According to the 2011 UK Census Birmingham was home to the largest Black Caribbean population, followed by Croydon, Lewisham, Lambeth, Brent and Hackney.

== Religion ==
Religion	England and Wales			
Religion	2011		2021	
Religion	Number	%	Number	%
Christianity	441,544	74.23%	430,770	69.13%
No religion	76,616	12.88%	116,143	18.64%
Islam	7,345	1.23%	7,167	1.15%
Judaism	511	0.09%	650	0.10%
Buddhism	1,145	0.19%	1,251	0.20%
Hinduism	1,344	0.23%	798	0.13%
Sikhism	349	0.06%	108	0.02%
Other religions	4,065	0.68%	6,909	1.11%
Not Stated	61,906	10.41%	59,323	9.52%

== History ==
=== Early pioneers ===
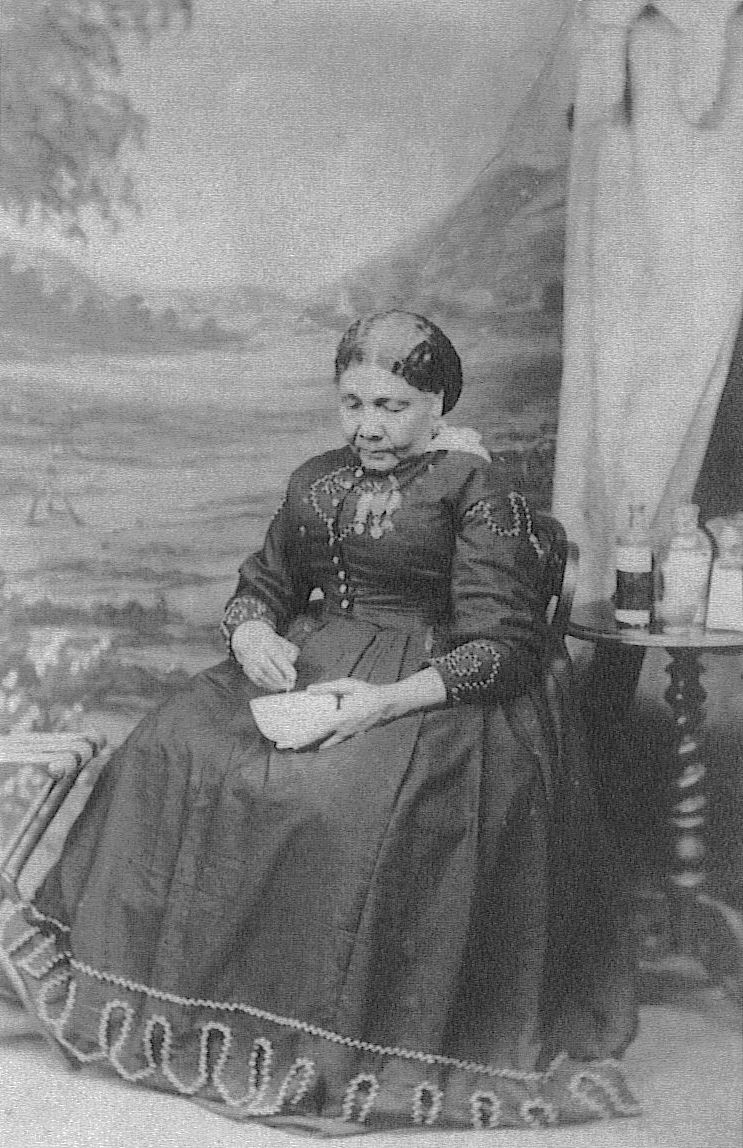
Photograph of Mary Seacole, taken for a carte de visite by Maull & Company in London (c.1873)

Beginning from the 16th century until the early 19th century, Africans were purchased by European slave traders and shipped across the Atlantic to work as slaves in the various European colonies in the Americas. Approximately 13 million Africans came to the Americas this way, to various locations such as Saint-Domingue, New Spain, Colonial Brazil and the Thirteen Colonies. Historians estimated approximately two million Africans were shipped to various British colonies in the Caribbean and South America. These slaves would be given new names, adopt European dress and Christianity, and be forced to work on plantations which produced cash crops to be shipped back to Europe, completing the last leg of the triangular trade. Conditions on these plantations were harsh, and many escaped into the countryside or showed other forms of resistance.

One impact of the American War of Independence was the differing historical development of African-American and African-Caribbeans. Whereas the American colonists had legalised slavery via their colonial assemblies, slavery was never legal under British common law and was thus prohibited in Britain.

The much lauded black Briton Ignatius Sancho was among the leading British abolitionists in the 18th century, and in 1783 an abolitionist movement spread throughout Britain to end slavery throughout the British Empire, with the poet William Cowper writing in 1785: "We have no slaves at home – Then why abroad? Slaves cannot breathe in England; if their lungs receive our air, that moment they are free. They touch our country, and their shackles fall. That's noble, and bespeaks a nation proud. And jealous of the blessing. Spread it then, And let it circulate through every vein." There are records of small communities in the ports of Cardiff, Liverpool, London and South Shields dating back to the mid-18th century. These communities were formed by freed slaves following the abolition of slavery in 1833. Typical occupations of the early migrants were footmen or coachmen.

=== 19th century ===
Prominent African-Caribbean people in Britain during the 19th century include:

- William Davidson (1781–1820), Cato Street Conspirator
- Rev. George Cosens (1805–1881), a Jamaican who became minister of Cradley Heath Baptist Church in 1837
- Mary Seacole (1805–1881), a nurse in the Crimean War. Voted the greatest ever Black Briton.
- Walter Tull (1888–1918), footballer and soldier,
- Andrew Watson (1856–1921), footballer.
- Robert Wedderburn (1762–1835/6?), Spencean revolutionary
- Nathaniel Wells (1779–1852), landowner and yeomanry officer.

=== Early 20th century ===
The growing Caribbean presence in the British military led to approximately 15,000 Afro-Caribbean immigrants arriving in the north-west of England around the time of World War I to work in munitions factories.

During the First World War, Sergeant William Robinson Clarke travelled from his native Jamaica and became Britain's first black pilot.

The Jamaican poet and communist activist, Claude McKay came to England following the First World War and became the first Black British journalist, writing for the Workers' Dreadnought.

Bahamian Dr Allan Glaisyer Minns became the first black mayor in Britain when he was elected Mayor of Thetford, Norfolk, in 1904.

=== World War II ===
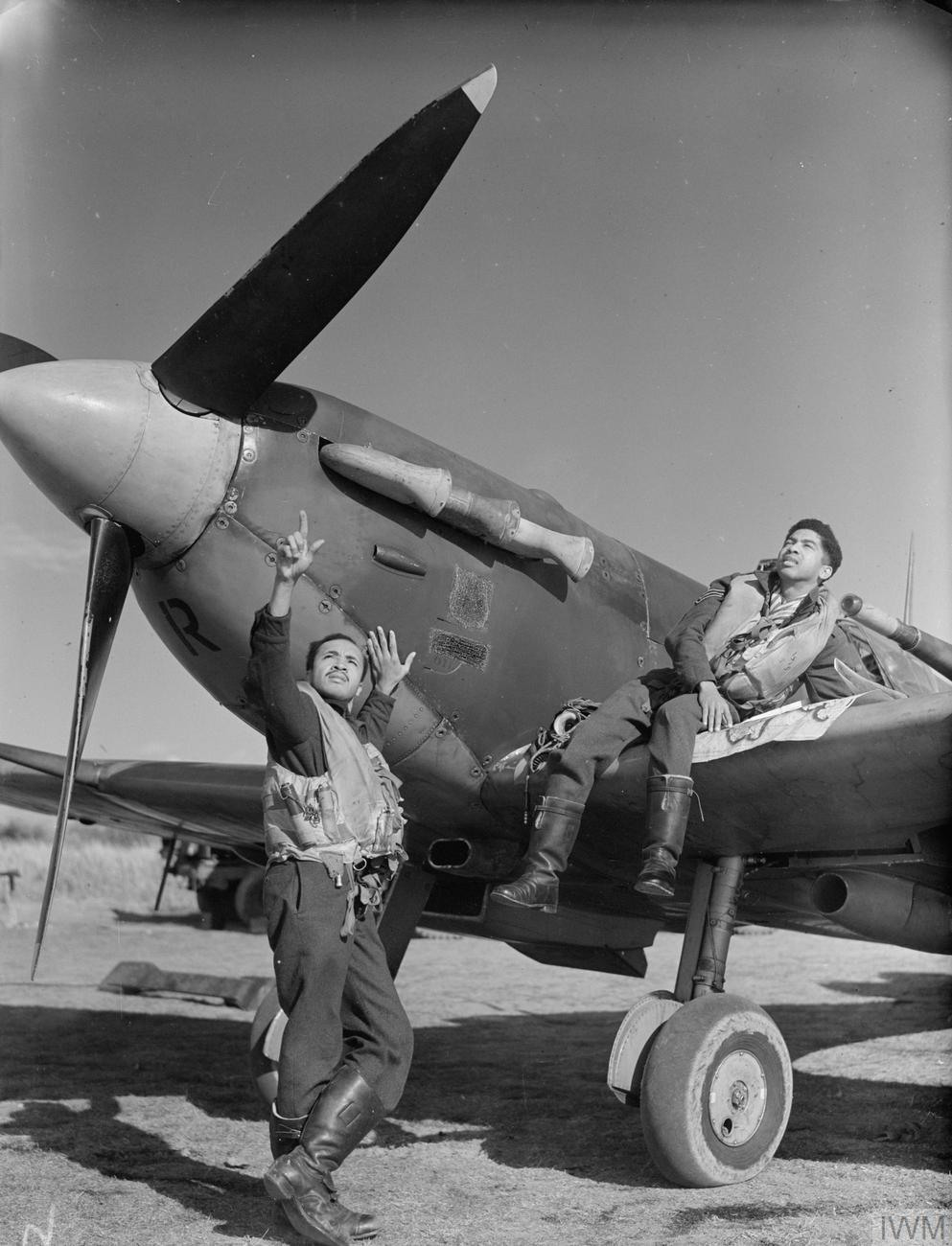
Barbadian and Trinidadian pilots in the Royal Air Force during the Second World War

In February 1941, 345 West Indian workers were brought to work in and around Liverpool. They were generally better skilled than the local Black British population. There was some tension between them and West Africans who had settled in the area.

=== The "Windrush generation" ===
'Windrush generation' is used to refer to people from across the former British Empire who migrated to Britain from the British Commonwealth, from 1948, with the arrival of HMT Empire Windrush, until 1 January 1973 when the Immigration Act 1971 was implemented on the same day as the UK's accession to the European Economic Community (EEC).

After World War II, many Caribbean people migrated to North America and Europe, especially to the United States, Canada, the United Kingdom, France, and the Netherlands. As a result of the losses during the war, the British government began to encourage mass immigration from mainland Europe to fill shortages in the labour market. Citizens from the former countries of the British Empire and Commonwealth also began to seek work in the UK, though the government's preference was for European workers to fill shortages. Kenneth Lunn writes that, "By promoting employment schemes for white European workers to fill existing labour shortages and by choosing to discourage, albeit in an informal manner, black workers from the Commonwealth, a clear set of preferences were displayed". The Ministry of Labour was particularly opposed to recruiting labour from the Caribbean, arguing that "previously advertised shortages no longer existed. In labour sectors where shortages could not be denied, the ministry concentrated on demonstrating that colonial citizens would make unsuitable workers". Nonetheless, the British Nationality Act 1948 gave Citizenship of the UK and Colonies to all people living in the United Kingdom and its colonies, and the right of entry and settlement in the UK. Many West Indians were attracted by better prospects in what was often referred to as the mother country.

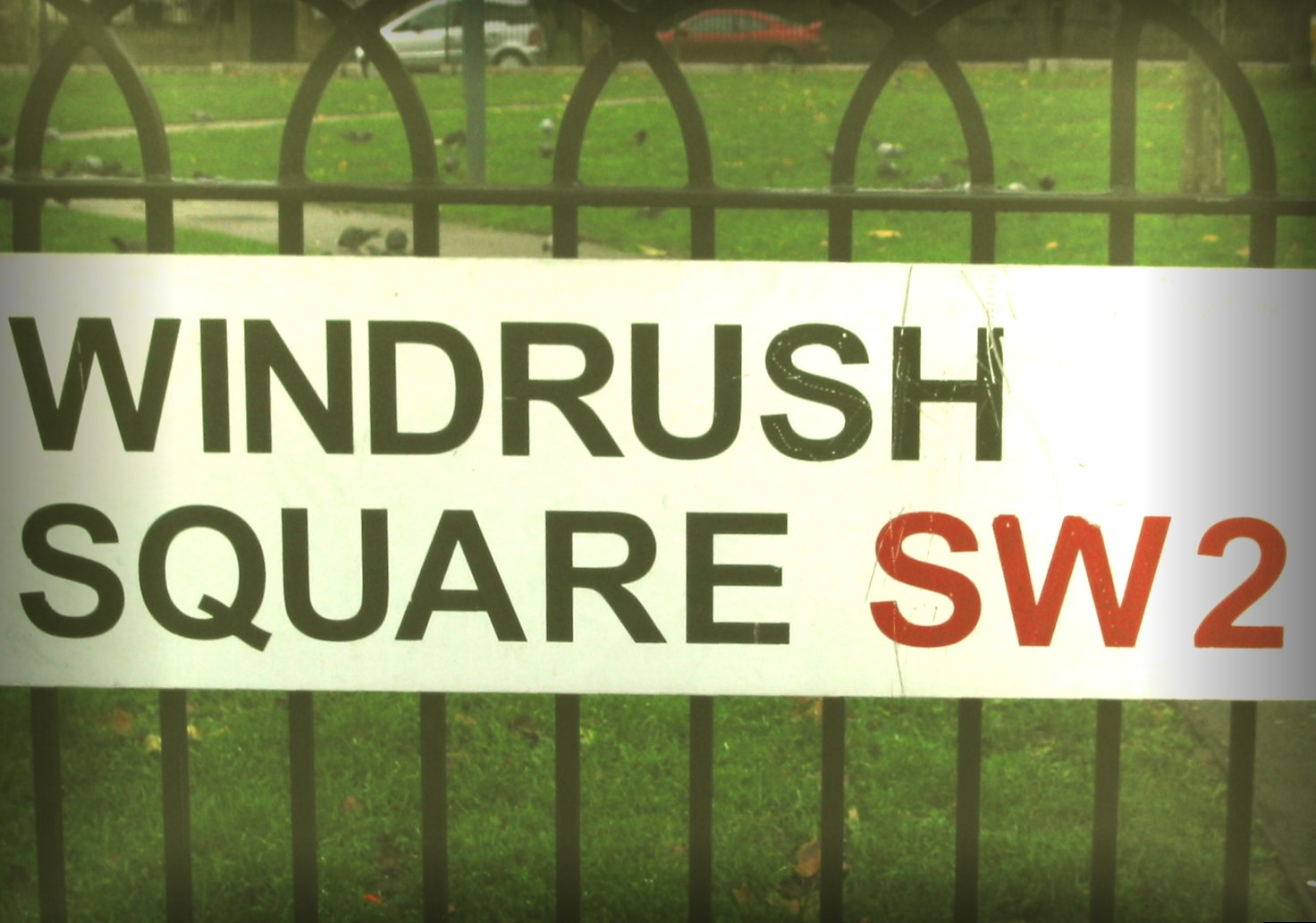
In 1998, a public open space in Brixton, south London, was renamed Windrush Square to commemorate the 50th anniversary of the arrival of the ship bringing one of the first large groups of West Indian migrants to the UK.

The first ships to carry large groups of West Indian people from Jamaica to the United Kingdom were the SS Ormonde, which docked at Liverpool on 31 March 1947 with 241 passengers, and the SS Almanzora, which arrived at Southampton on 21 December that same year, with 200 passengers. However, it was the voyage of HMT Empire Windrush in June the following year that was to become well-known.

Empire Windrush arrived with a group of 802 migrants at the port of Tilbury, near London, on 22 June 1948. Empire Windrush was a troopship en route from Australia to England via the Atlantic, docking in Kingston, Jamaica, in order to pick up servicemen who were on leave. An advertisement had appeared in a Jamaican newspaper offering cheap transport on the ship for anybody who wanted to travel to the United Kingdom. Many former servicemen took this opportunity to return to Britain with the hopes of rejoining the RAF, while others decided to make the journey just to see what England was like. Unlike the previous two ships, the arrival of the Windrush received a great deal of media attention and was reported by newspaper reporters and newsreel cameras.

The arrivals were temporarily housed in the Clapham South deep shelter in southwest London, about two miles (three kilometres) away from Coldharbour Lane in Brixton. Many intended to stay in Britain for less than a few years, and some did return to the Caribbean, but the majority remained to settle permanently in Britain. The arrival of the passengers became an important landmark in the history of modern Britain, and the image of West Indians filing off the ship's gangplank has come to symbolise the beginning of modern British multicultural society.

The arrival of West Indian immigrants on the Empire Windrush was not expected nor approved of by the British government. George Isaacs, the Minister of Labour and National Service stated in Parliament that there would be no encouragement for others to follow their example. In June 1948, 11 Labour Members wrote to British Prime Minister Clement Attlee complaining about excessive immigration. In the same month, Arthur Creech Jones, the Secretary of State for the Colonies noted in a Cabinet memorandum that the Jamaican government could not legally prevent people from departing, and the British government could not legally prevent them from landing. However, he also stated that the government was opposed to this immigration, the Colonial Office and the Jamaican government would take all possible steps to discourage it.

In June 1950, a Cabinet committee was established to find "ways which might be adopted to check the immigration into this country of coloured people from British colonial territories." In February 1951, the committee reported that no restrictions were required.

There was plenty of work in post-war Britain, and industries such as health, transport, and engineering directly recruited overseas workers from the Commonwealth. Though African-Caribbean people were encouraged to journey to Britain through immigration campaigns created by successive British governments, many new arrivals endured prejudice, intolerance and racism from sectors of white society. This experience marked African-Caribbean people's relations with the wider community over a long period. Early African-Caribbean immigrants found private employment and housing denied to them on the basis of race. Trade unions would often not help African-Caribbean workers and some pubs, clubs, dance halls and churches would bar black people from entering. Housing was in short supply following the wartime bombing, and the shortage led to some of the first clashes with the established white community. Clashes continued and worsened into the 1950s, and riots erupted in cities including London, Birmingham and Nottingham. In 1958, attacks in the London area of Notting Hill by white youths marred relations with West Indian residents, and the following year as a positive response by the Caribbean community an indoor carnival event organised by West Indian Gazette editor Claudia Jones took place in St Pancras Town Hall, and would be a precursor to what became the annual Notting Hill Carnival. Some of the racism and intolerance was stoked by explicitly fascist or anti-immigration movements including Oswald Mosley's Union Movement, the League of Empire Loyalists, the White Defence League, the National Labour Party and others. Influenced by this kind of propaganda, gangs of Teddy Boys would sometimes attack black people in London. Historian Winston James argues that the experience of suffering racism was a major factor in the development of a shared Caribbean identity among immigrants from a range of different island and class backgrounds. The shared experience of employment by organisations such as London Transport and the National Health Service also played a role in the building of a British African-Caribbean identity.

Social Geographer Ceri Peach estimates that the number of people in Britain born in the West Indies grew from 15,000 in 1951 to 172,000 in 1961. In 1962, the UK enacted the Commonwealth Immigrants Act, restricting the entry of immigrants, and by 1972 only holders of work permits, or people with parents or grandparents born in the United Kingdom, could gain entry – effectively stemming most Caribbean immigration. Despite the restrictive measures, an entire generation of Britons with African-Caribbean heritage now existed. This generation made notable contributions in sectors including the National Health Service, public transport, sport, music, literature and cultural life.

=== Recession and turbulence, 1970s and 1980s ===
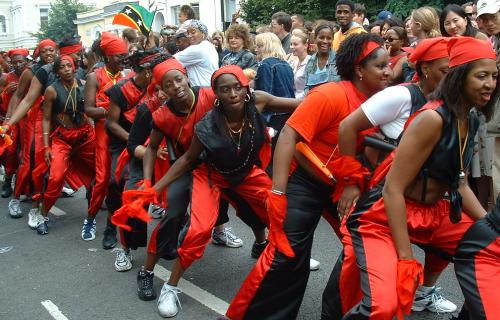
Dancers at the Notting Hill Carnival

The 1970s and 1980s were decades of comparative turbulence in wider British society; industrial disputes preceded a period of deep recession and widespread unemployment which seriously affected the economically less prosperous African-Caribbean community. During the decades of the 1970s and 1980s, unemployment among the children of Caribbean migrants ran at three to four times that of white school leavers. By 1982 the number of all people out of work in Britain had risen above three million for the first time since the 1930s. Societal racism, discrimination, poverty, powerlessness and oppressive policing sparked a series of riots in areas with substantial African-Caribbean populations. These "uprisings" (as they were described by some in the community) took place in St Pauls in 1980, Brixton, Toxteth and Moss Side in 1981, St Pauls again in 1982, Notting Hill Gate in 1982, Toxteth in 1982, and Handsworth, Brixton and Tottenham in 1985.

The riots had a profoundly unsettling effect on local residents, and led the then Home Secretary William Whitelaw to commission the Scarman report to address the root causes of the disturbances. The report identified both "racial discrimination" and a "racial disadvantage" in Britain, concluding that urgent action was needed to prevent these issues becoming an "endemic, ineradicable disease threatening the very survival of our society". The era saw an increase in attacks on black people by white people. The Joint Campaign Against Racism committee reported that there had been more than 20,000 attacks on non-white Britons including Britons of Asian origin during 1985.

=== 1990s and 21st century ===
The police response to the 1993 murder of black teenager Stephen Lawrence led to outcry and calls to investigate police conduct. The ensuing government inquiry, the Macpherson Report, concluded that there was institutional racism in London's Metropolitan Police Service.

In 2009, 1.2% of British children under 16 were Black Caribbean and 1.1% were biracial white and black Caribbean. Among those children who were living with at least one Caribbean parent, only one in five was living with two Caribbean parents.

In 2015 Catherine Ross, who came to the UK from Saint Kitts as a child, founded the SKN (Skills, Knowledge and Networks) Heritage Museum, which became Museumand: The National Caribbean Heritage Museum, a "museum without walls" based in Nottingham.

=== Windrush scandal ===
From November 2017 British newspapers reported that the Home Office had threatened Commonwealth immigrants who arrived before 1973 with deportation if they could not prove their right to remain in the UK. In April 2018, Prime Minister Theresa May apologised to leaders of Caribbean countries about the way immigrants had been treated, promising compensation to those affected. In what has become known as the "Windrush scandal", Home Secretary Amber Rudd initially denied the existence of, and later denied being aware of aggressive departmental deportation targets, but eventually resigned on 29 April 2018 after news outlets published documents indicating that she knew of the targets. Prior to Rudd's resignation, Sajid Javid, her successor as home secretary, had expressed sympathy for the victims of the scandal, telling the Sunday Telegraph that "I thought, 'That could be my mum [...] my dad [...] my uncle [...] it could be me.'" Landing cards relating to earlier passenger arrivals in the United Kingdom had been destroyed in October 2010. A public inquiry ordered by the House of Commons, titled the Windrush Lessons Learned Review, was published in March 2020.

== Genetics ==
=== Genome-wide studies ===
Genome-wide research of Afro-Caribbean people have shown that the grouping, on average, have 77.4% African, 15.9% European, and 6.7% Asian DNA. This 2010 study represented African Caribbeans living within the Caribbean. Within the United Kingdom, men and women of African Caribbean origin or ancestry were also found to have around 13 per cent of their DNA from sources other than Africa. In the research, only volunteers who had all four grandparents of Afro-Caribbean origin were sampled. Researchers have been able to attribute this partly to historic European males' sexual exploitation of enslaved African women.

== Notable contributions ==
=== Academia ===
There are a number of African-Caribbean academics who are especially prominent in the arts and humanities. Professor Paul Gilroy, of Afro-Guyanese and English heritage, is one of Britain's leading academics, having taught sociology at Harvard as well as Goldsmiths College and the London School of Economics. The Jamaican-born cultural theorist Professor Stuart Hall has also been a highly influential British intellectual since the 1960s. Dr. Robert Beckford has presented several national television and radio documentaries exploring African-Caribbean history, culture and religion.

Other prominent academics include Guyanese born Professor Gus John, who has been active in education, schooling and political radicalism in Britain's inner cities such as Manchester, Birmingham and London since the 1960s. He was involved in the organising the "Black people's day of action", a response to the 1981 New Cross Fire. In 1989 he was appointed Director of Education in Hackney and was the first black person to hold such a position. He has also worked as an education consultant in Europe, the Caribbean and Africa. John was the co-ordinator of the Black Parents Movement in Manchester, founded the Education for Liberation book service and helped to organise the International Book Fair of Radical Black and Third World Books in Manchester, London and Bradford. He has worked in a number of university settings, including a visiting faculty professor of education at the University of Strathclyde in Glasgow and is currently an associate professor of the Institute of Education at the University of London.

Dr "William" Lez Henry works with young people, particularly black boys. He is the founder of Black Liberation Afrikan Knowledge (BLK Friday) a platform for people to give presentations to the community. In 2005, he received an Excellence in Education Award at the Challenging The Genius: Excellent Education for Children: "Our Future is Not a dream", Conference in Chicago, USA. He is one of the founding members of the National Independent Education Coalition (NIEC). Henry previously hosted a fortnightly talk show on popular London pirate radio station Galaxy 102.5FM (formerly 99.5 FM) and who is also a former lecturer of Goldsmiths College. Prof. Harry Goldbourne is a former member of the radical group the Black Unity and Freedom Party who went on to teach at the University of the South Bank.

=== Acting and entertainment ===
The 1970s saw the emergence of independent filmmakers such as Trinidadian-born Horace Ové, the director of Pressure, among others. London's Talawa Theatre Company was founded in the 1985 by Jamaican-born Yvonne Brewster, their first production being based on C. L. R. James's historical account of the Haitian Revolution, The Black Jacobins. Since the 1980s, the Blue Mountain Theatre's productions have offered a more earthy style of populist comedy, often bringing over Jamaican artists such as Oliver Samuels.

While Guyanese actor Robert Adams became the first African-Caribbean dramatic actor to appear on British television on 11 May 1938 (in a production of Eugene O'Neill's play The Emperor Jones), African-Caribbean entertainers were first widely popularised on British television broadcasts with the postwar resumption of BBC television in 1946 (pre-war Black entertainers on the BBC – the first in the world – had primarily been African-American stars). The profile of African-Caribbean actors on television, such as Lennie James, Judith Jacob and Diane Parish, has widened substantially since 1970s programmes such as: Love Thy Neighbour (Rudolph Walker) and Rising Damp (Don Warrington) when their role was often to act simply as either the butt of, or foil to, racist jokes made by White characters. The most influential programme in moving away from this formula was the 1989–94 Channel Four barbershop sitcom Desmond's, starring Norman Beaton and Carmen Munroe. In 1982, Peter Davison, who is of Afro-Guyanese and English descent, was the then-youngest-ever actor to play the Doctor in Doctor Who.

In the fine arts, Brenda Garratt-Glassman, the daughter of Guyanese parents, became the first Black British ballet dancer when she joined the Royal Ballet School in 1970. She was told by the school that she was talented enough to train but could never join the company because she was Black. She went on to join Dance Theatre of Harlem in 1973.

One of the biggest African-Caribbean names in comedy is Lenny Henry, who began his career as a stand-up comedian but whose television sketch shows, where he often caricatured Caribbean émigrés, made him popular enough to headline numerous primetime comedy shows from, for instance, Lenny Henry in 1984 to The Lenny Henry Show in 2004. Becoming a prominent television personality between 2002 and 2009 after appearing on series Big Brother, Jade Goody was of Afro-Jamaican and English descent. Another Big Brother contestant, Alison Hammond, has appeared on many television programmes and in 2020, ITV announced a shake-up of This Morning presenters, with Hammond replacing Eamonn Holmes and Ruth Langsford on a Friday, presenting alongside Dermot O'Leary. Hammond is of Afro-Jamaican descent.

Another big African-Caribbean name is Ainsley Harriott, who has appeared in several shows including Ready Steady Cook, Can't Cook, Won't Cook, City Hospital, Red Dwarf and Strictly Come Dancing. In September 2008, Harriott explored his Caribbean heritage, taking part in the genealogy documentary series, Who Do You Think You Are?.

Other television personalities and presenters include Angellica Bell, Andi Oliver, Alesha Dixon, Josie d'Arby, Diane-Louise Jordan, Floella Benjamin, Margherita Taylor, Trisha Goddard, Shaun Wallace, Mr Motivator, Alex Scott, Marvin and Rochelle Humes.

The highest professional achievement by a British African-Caribbean actor was Marianne Jean-Baptiste's 1996 nominations for an Academy Award (Oscar), Golden Globe and British Academy Award (Bafta) for her feature-film debut role in Secrets & Lies. Naomie Harris replicated this in 2017, with nominations for a Golden Globe, BAFTA and Oscar for her performance in Moonlight. Numerous British African-Caribbean actors have become successful in US film and television. In 2009 portraying Lord Voldemort – one of the most famous characters in cinematic history – Frank Dillane has Afro-Jamaican and English heritage. Oxfordshire-born Wentworth Miller of Prison Break fame is also of partial Jamaican descent. Miller earned a Golden Globe Award nomination for his Prison Break role and won a Saturn Award for his guest appearance in the critically acclaimed The Flash. Actor Stephen Graham, who has featured in three Martin Scorsese directed productions, has Afro-Jamaican, Swedish and English ancestry. Delroy Lindo earned a Satellite Award for his role in American docudrama television film Glory & Honor and won numerous accolades for his role as Paul, in Spike Lee's highly praised Da 5 Bloods. Lindo is of Jamaican heritage. Colin Salmon, who is also of Jamaican descent, is known for playing Charles Robinson in three James Bond films and James "One" Shade in the Resident Evil film series. Marsha Thomason, who is of mixed Jamaican and English heritage, has appeared in Disney's The Haunted Mansion, opposite Eddie Murphy, and US television series Las Vegas, Lost and White Collar. Ashley Walters, of Jamaican ancestry, played the role as Antoine in Get Rich or Die Tryin' David Harewood, who is Barbadian descent, played David Estes, Director of the CIA's Counter-terrorism Centre in the highly successful television series Homeland. He also played a lead role in the popular American superhero TV series Supergirl.

Harewood was honoured with the Variety Outstanding Achievement Award in recognition of his work and success in both the UK and US. Lashana Lynch featured opposite Brie Larson in 2019's Captain Marvel and played the role of Nomi, the secret agent who replaces Craig's retired Bond in No Time to Die. Lynch won a BAFTA for her role in No Time to Die, thanking her Jamaican parents while accepting the award. Adrian Lester, who is of Jamaican descent, featured in the political blockbuster Primary Colors, directed by Mike Nicholls and co-starring John Travolta, Kathy Bates, Billy Bob Thornton and Emma Thompson. This part earned Lester a Chicago Film Critics Association award nomination for "Most Promising Actor".

=== Art and design ===
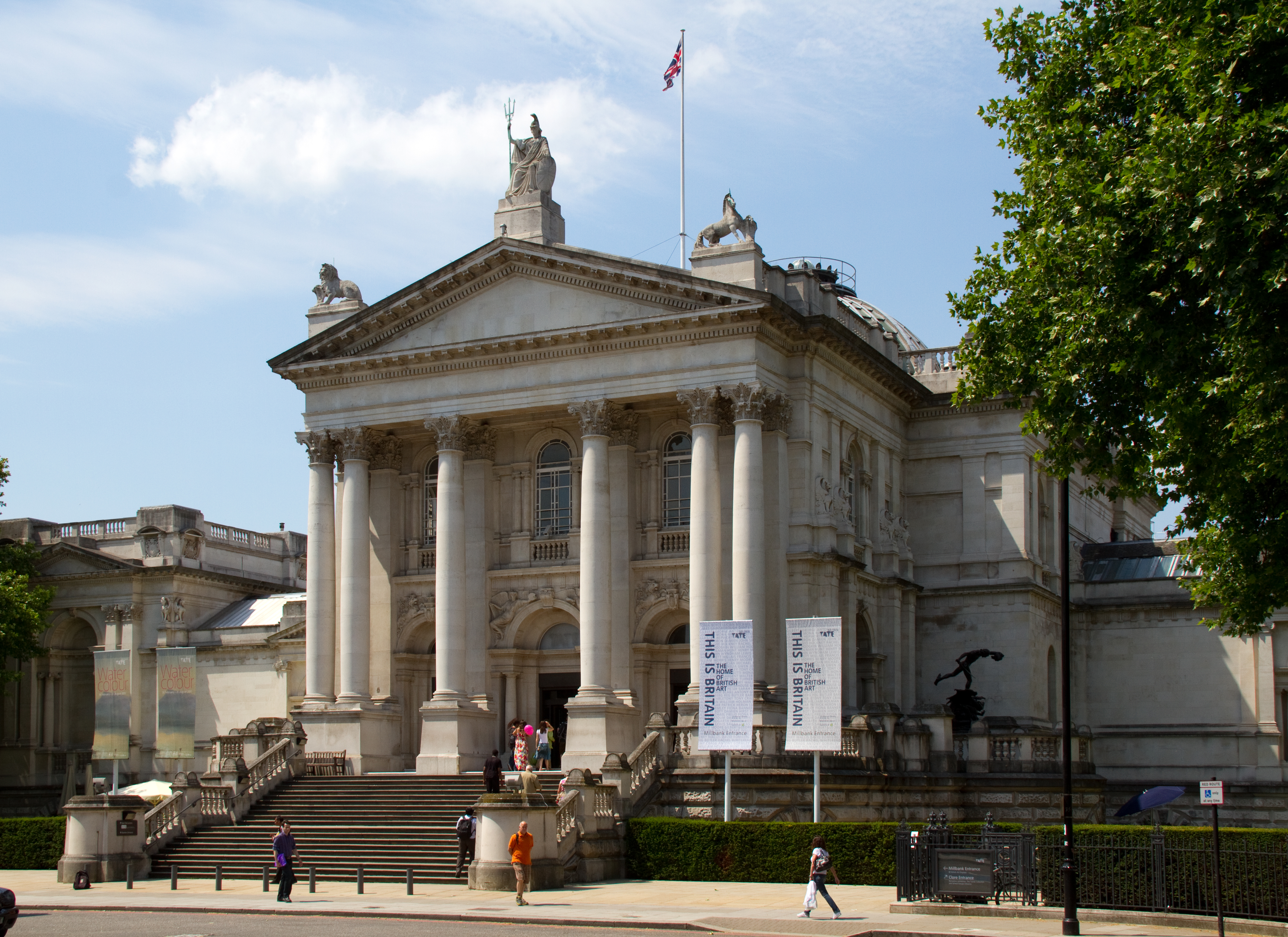
Tate Britain, which houses works by Donald Rodney and Sonia Boyce

One of the most influential African-Caribbean people in the British art world has been Prof. Eddie Chambers. Chambers, along with Donald Rodney, Marlene Smith and curator, artist, critic and academic Keith Piper, founded the BLK Art Group in 1982, when they were initially based in the West Midlands. According to Chambers, significant artists such as the Guyanese-born painters Aubrey Williams and Frank Bowling and the Jamaican sculptor Ronald Moody initially found that, despite achieving worldwide renown, it was difficult to find acceptance in the highest echelons of the art establishment. Chambers worked with Donald Rodney and Sonia Boyce, both of whose work is represented in the permanent collections of the London's Tate Britain museum. In 1986 the Hayward Gallery presented the exhibition The Other Story, which provided a survey of African-Caribbean, African and Asian artists working in the UK.

==== Life Between Islands: Caribbean-British Art 1950s – Now, Tate Britain ====
From December 1, 2021, to April 3, 2022, the Tate Britain museum presented the exposition, Life Between Islands: Caribbean-British Art 1950s – Now co-curated by David A. Bailey, Director of the International Curators Forum, and Alex Farquharson, Director of Tate Britain. This exhibition was also presented at the Art Gallery of Ontario, Toronto, Canada from December 6, 2023, to April 1, 2024. The exhibition featured over 40 artists and scholars with ties to Caribbean-British history including Aubrey Williams, David Scott, Frank Bowling, Donald Locke, Horace Ové, Sonia Boyce, Chris Ofili, Claudette Johnson, Peter Doig, Hurvin Anderson, Michael McMillan, Grace Wales Bonner, Barbara Walker, Alberta Whittle and others. The relationship between the Caribbean and Britain and reconsiders British art history in the twentieth and twenty-first centuries from a Caribbean perspective. Life Between Islands: Caribbean-British Art 1950s – Now explored Caribbean-British history and cultural contributions from a Caribbean viewpoint. The exhibition was accompanied by a catalogue.

==== African-Caribbean artists ====
Other African-Caribbean artists of note include Faisal Abdu'allah of Jamaican heritage, Guyanese-born Ingrid Pollard, British-based Jamaican painter Eugene Palmer, the sculptor George "Fowokan" Kelly, and Tam Joseph, whose 1983 work Spirit of Carnival was a vivid depiction of the Notting Hill Carnival. The movement was also part of the impetus that led to the founding of the Association of Black Photographers by Mark Sealy and others. In 1999 the filmmaker Steve McQueen (not to be confused with the Hollywood filmstar) won Britain's most prestigious art prize, the Turner Prize, for his video Deadpan. The artist and producer Pogus Caesar was commissioned by Artangel to direct a film based on McQueen's work. Forward Ever – Backward Never was premiered at the Lumiere in London in 2002. Caesar has also established the OOM Gallery Archives, based in Birmingham, which has in excess of 14,000 images including photographs of contemporary Black British culture.

=== Music ===
Edmundo Ros OBE, FRAM was a Trinidadian musician, vocalist, arranger and bandleader who made his career in Britain since 1940. He directed a highly popular Latin American orchestra, had an extensive recording career and owned one of London's leading nightclubs.

In 1983, Cleo Laine won the Grammy Award for Best Female Jazz Vocal Performance for Cleo at Carnegie: The 10th Anniversary Concert. Laine has Jamaican heritage. Caribbean Queen scored Billy Ocean two Grammy Award nominations and won him the Best Male R&B Vocal Performance at the 1985 Grammy Awards. Ocean was born in Trinidad but has lived in Sunningdale, Berkshire since 1978. In 1987, Steel Pulse won the Grammy Award for Best Reggae Album, Babylon The Bandit. Original band members (David Hinds, Basil Gabbidon and Ronald McQueen) are all of Jamaican descent. Formed in 1988, Soul II Soul gained significant popularity in the US and achieved two Grammy Awards. Founding member Jazzie B is of Antiguan descent, while lead singer, Caron Wheeler, has Jamaican ancestry. With worldwide record sales of more than 70 million, Grammy Award-nominated UB40 has various members of Caribbean heritage. With multiple UK number-one achievements between 1999 and 2001, S Club 7 had two members of African-Caribbean heritage. Bradley McIntosh was born to African-Jamaican parents, who had been members of funk group The Cool Notes, and Tina Barrett, who has African-Guyanese and English ancestry. Melanie Brown was an integral part of the 90s girl group The Spice Girls, reportedly the best-selling female group of all time. Brown was born to a father from Saint Kitts and Nevis. Leigh-Anne Pinnock is a member of Little Mix, one of the best-selling girl groups of all time. Pinnock has Barbadian and Jamaican ancestry.

4hero, are a rotating musical collective founded in 1989 in Dollis Hill, London, UK. The group currently consists of members Marc Mac (aka Mark Anthony Clair) and Dego (Dennis McFarlane). 4hero are known for pioneering electronic music sounds of the rave scene including breakbeat hardcore, darkcore, jungle, drum and bass, broken beat and nu jazz music.

Estelle, who has a Grenadian father, picked up a Grammy Award for Best Rap/Sung Collaboration in 2009. Corinne Bailey Rae, achieved Grammy Awards in 2008 and 2012. Her father is from Saint Kitts and Nevis. Part-Jamaican, Ella Mai, won the Grammy Award for Best R&B Song in 2019. Olivia Dean, who won the Grammy Award for Best New Artist in 2026, has a mother of Jamaican-Guyanese descent and openly discussed her Caribbean roots and having a grandmother from the Windrush generation. A Mercury Prize and Grammy Awards-nominated artist, rapper Slowthai has Afro-Barbadian, English and Irish ancestry. Nilüfer Yanya has the same background, and also Turkish heritage. Other Grammy nominated British-Caribbean artists include Joan Armatrading, Aswad, Craig David, Eddy Grant, Lianne La Havas, Leona Lewis, Mahalia, Julian Marley, Musical Youth, Nao, Maxi Priest and Jorja Smith.

=== Politics ===
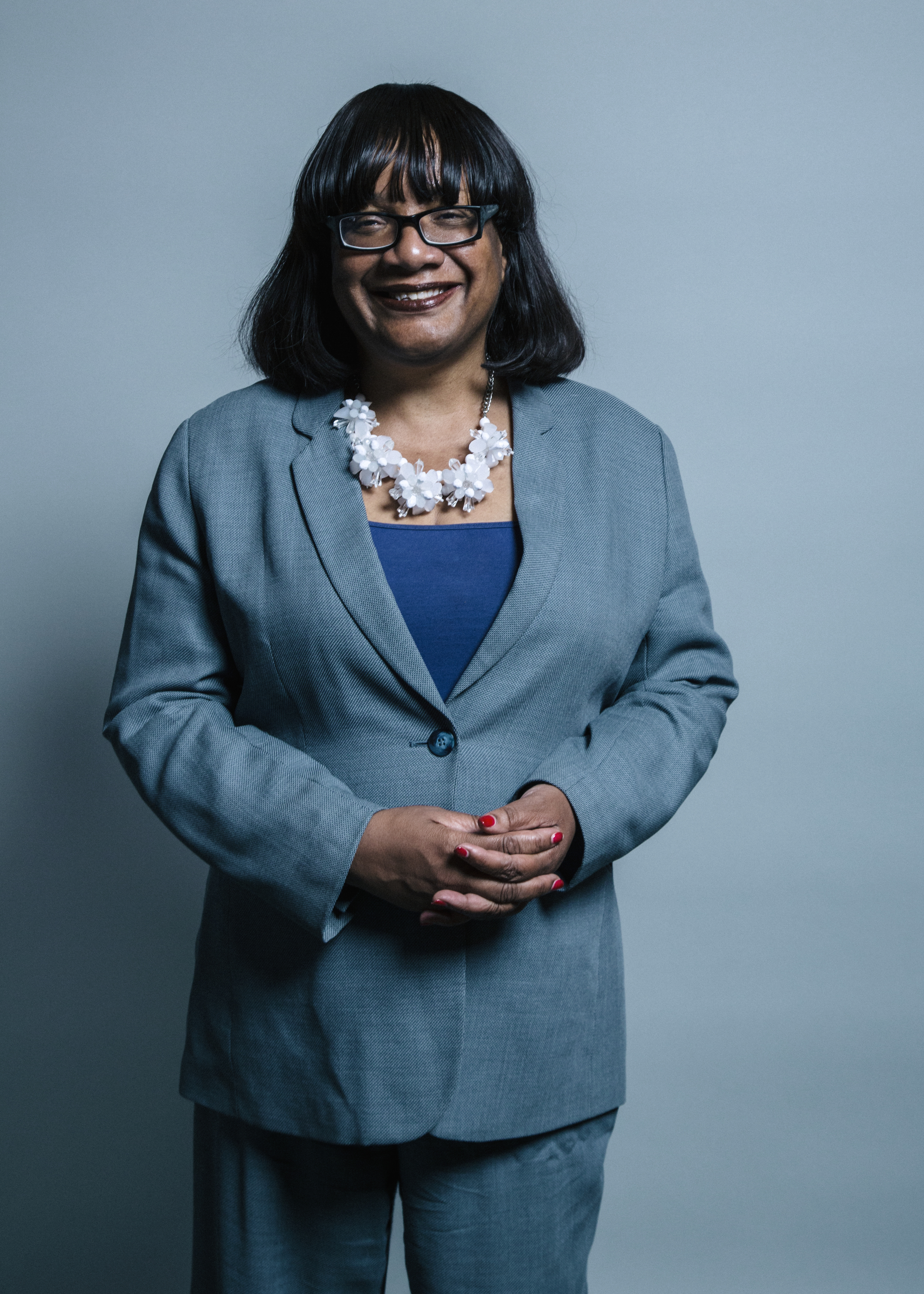
Diane Abbott, born to Jamaican parents, became the first black woman elected to the House of Commons in 1987.

African-Caribbeans have made significant contributions to British politics and trade unionism. Labour MP Diane Abbott became the first black female to be elected to the House of Commons in 1987. Elected alongside her was one other African-Caribbean Labour MP, Bernie Grant, who had Guyanese heritage. Linda C. Douglas was the first black member of the party's National Executive Committee, representing the later expelled Militant tendency. Jamaican-born Bill Morris was General Secretary of the Transport and General Workers' Union from 1992 to 2003, and became the first black leader of a major British trade union. Jamaican-born Lurline Champagnie became the first black woman to stand as a parliamentary candidate for the Conservative Party in 1992. Guyana-born Valerie Amos became the first black woman to serve as a Cabinet minister in 2003 Dawn Butler, who has Jamaican ancestry, became the first black female to speak from the despatch box in the House of Commons in 2009. Dominican-born Patricia Scotland was elected the first female Commonwealth Secretary-General in 2015. Marvin Rees, who has partial Jamaican heritage, is the UK's first directly elected black mayor. In 2022, Paulette Hamilton won the Erdington by-election to become Birmingham's first Black MP. Hamilton has Jamaican ancestry.

Paul Boateng, of Ghanaian-Caribbean descent, became the first Black Cabinet minister in the UK when he was appointed Chief Secretary to the Treasury in 2002. Boateng's political career also included serving as an MP and later as the UK’s high commissioner to South Africa, contributing to British and international politics. In the House of Lords, Baroness Floella Benjamin, born in Trinidad, has been an important advocate for children's rights and education. Her work as a life peer reflects the increasing representation of African-Caribbean individuals in the upper chamber of Parliament.

Other notable contributors include David Lammy, Jennette Arnold, Jocelyn Barrow, Doreen Lawrence, Alison Lowe, Brenda Dacres, Shakira Martin, Lydia Simmons, Henry Gunter, Sam Beaver King, Harold Moody and Stuart Hall.

=== Sport ===
British African-Caribbean people are well represented in traditional British sports such as football and rugby, and have also represented the nation at the highest level in sports where Caribbean people typically excel in the home countries such as cricket and athletics. Some British African-Caribbean people have gone on to become international sports stars and top global earners in their chosen sporting field.

==== Athletics ====
Britain's first Olympic sprint medals came from Harry Edward, born in Guyana, who won two individual bronze medals at the 1920 games in Antwerp. Many years later, sprinter Linford Christie, born in Saint Andrew Parish, Jamaica, won 23 major championship medals, more than any other British male athlete to date. Christie's career highlight was winning a gold medal in the immensely competitive 100 metres event in the 1992 Barcelona Olympics. Welsh hurdler Colin Jackson, who went to considerable lengths to explore his Jamaican heritage in a BBC documentary, held the 110 metres hurdles world record for 11 years between 1993 and 2004.

Ethel Scott (1907–84), who had a Jamaican father and an English mother, was the first black woman to represent Great Britain in an international athletics competition. She was a sprinter active in international competitions for a brief period in the 1930s. Jamaican-born Tessa Sanderson became the first British African-Caribbean woman to win Olympic gold, receiving the medal for her javelin performance in the 1984 Los Angeles Olympics. Denise Lewis, of Jamaican heritage, won heptathlon gold in the 2000 Sydney Olympics, a games where 13 of Britain's 18 track and field representatives had Afro-Caribbean roots. Four years later in the Athens Olympics, Kelly Holmes, the daughter of a Jamaican-born car mechanic, achieved the rare feat of taking gold in both the 800 and 1500 metres races. In the same games, Britain's men's 4 × 100-metre relay team of Marlon Devonish, Darren Campbell, Mark Lewis-Francis and Jason Gardener, all of African-Caribbean heritage, beat the favoured United States quartet to claim Olympic gold. Jessica Ennis-Hill, the daughter of a Jamaican self-employed painter and decorator, won heptathlon gold in the 2012 London Olympics.

==== Boxing ====
British boxers of a Caribbean background have played a prominent role in the national boxing scene since the early 1980s. In 1995 Frank Bruno, whose mother was a Pentecostal lay preacher from Jamaica, became Britain's first world heavyweight boxing champion in the 20th century. Bruno's reign was shortly followed by British-born Jamaican Lennox Lewis, who defeated Evander Holyfield and Mike Tyson to become the world's premier heavyweight during the late 1990s. Middleweights Chris Eubank, who spent his early years in Jamaica, and Nigel Benn, of Barbadian descent, both claimed world titles and fought a series of brutal battles in the early 1990s. In the Sydney Olympics of 2000, Audley Harrison (who has Jamaican heritage) became Britain's first heavyweight gold medalist. Other boxing champions from the British African-Caribbean community include the welterweight Lloyd Honeyghan, nicknamed "Ragamuffin Man" by boxing superstar Donald Curry in 1986, in reference to his (in comparison to Curry's extravagance) normal appearance; Honeyghan subsequently spectacularly defeated Curry. James DeGale, who is of Afro-Grenadian and English descent, represented Great Britain at the 2008 Olympics as an amateur, winning a gold medal in the middleweight division. He became the first British boxer in history to win both an Olympic gold medal and a professional world title after landing the IBF super-middleweight crown in April 2015. David Haye, who has English and Jamaican heritage, was the first British boxer to reach the final of the World Amateur Boxing Championships. Haye is one of only three boxers in history to have unified the cruiserweight world titles and become a world heavyweight champion. Jamaican-born Dillian Whyte, has held the WBC interim heavyweight title since March 2021.

==== Cricket ====
Cricket has long been a popular pastime among African-Caribbean people in both the West Indies and the United Kingdom, though this has waned somewhat since its peak during the 1960s–1980s. After the period of widespread immigration, tours of England by the combined West Indian cricket team became cultural celebrations of Caribbean culture in Britain, particularly at cricket grounds such as The Oval in South London. Almost all the great West Indian cricketers became regular features of the domestic county game, including Garfield Sobers, Vivian Richards and Michael Holding. In turn, British cricketers of Caribbean origin also began to make an impact in English cricket. In the 1980s–1990s, players including Gladstone Small (born in Barbados), Devon Malcolm (born in Jamaica) and Phillip DeFreitas (born in Dominica) represented England, making significant contributions to the side. Phillip DeFreitas, Devon Malcolm and Gladstone Small made 44, 40 and 17 test match appearances for England respectively. DeFreitas also played 103 One Day Internationals for England. Malcolm made 10 appearances and Small made 53 appearances in the shorter format. Small and DeFreitas also represented England in the final of the 1987 Cricket World Cup against Australia.

==== Football ====
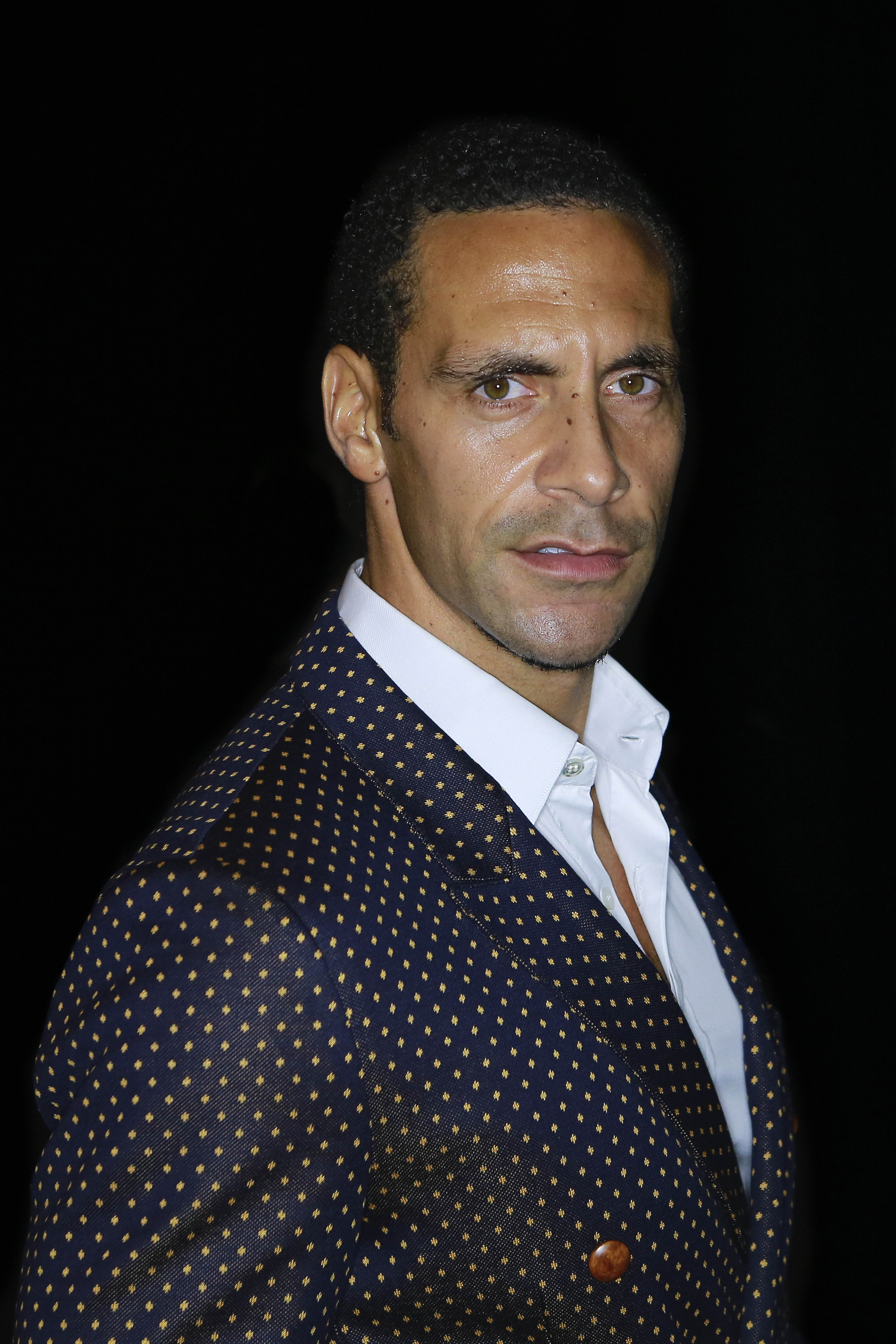
Rio Ferdinand, whose father came from St. Lucia to Britain, is a former captain of the England national team.

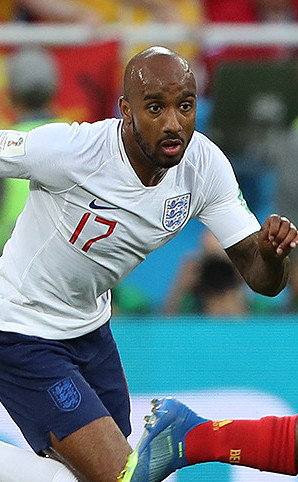
Fabian Delph, of Guyanese ancestry, won the 2017–18 Premier League with Manchester City and represented England at the 2018 FIFA World Cup

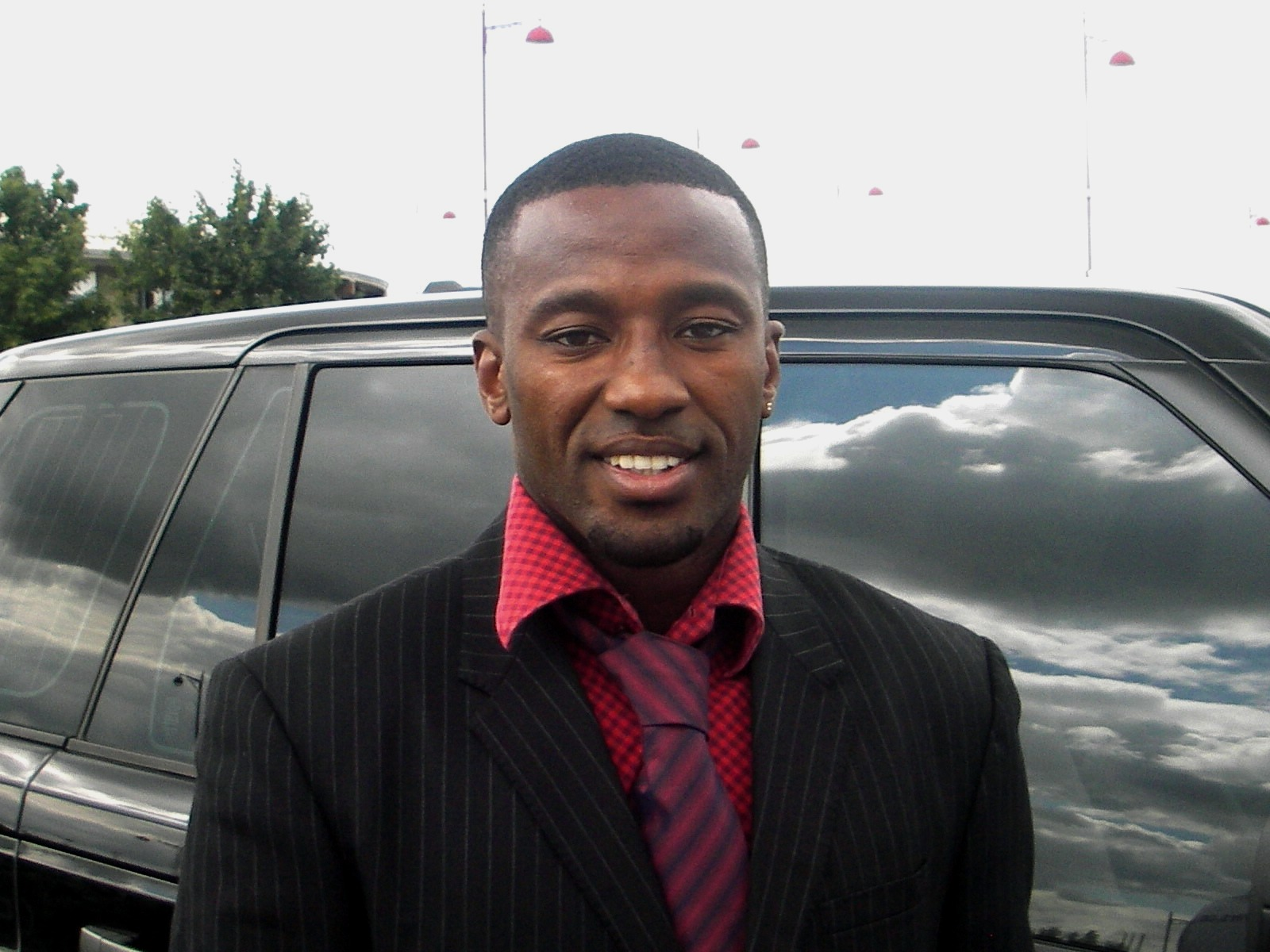
The former Derby County player Michael Johnson, who has played for the Jamaica national football team

The inaugural West Indian-born footballer to play football at a high level in Britain was Andrew Watson, who played for Queen's Park (Glasgow) and went on to play for Scotland. Born in May 1857 in British Guiana, Watson lived and worked in Scotland and came to be known as one of the best players of his generation. He played in 36 games for Queen's Park and also appeared for the London Swifts in the English FA Cup championship of 1882, making him the first Black player in English Cup history. Watson earned two Scottish Cup medals and four Charity Cup medals during his career; Who's Who also acknowledged his performances in international matches. Watson's place in football history included a spell in management as club secretary for Queen's Park – making Watson the first Afro-Caribbean man to reach the boardroom.

Other early Caribbean footballers included Walter Tull, of Barbadian descent, who played for the north London club Tottenham Hotspur in the early 20th century. Some years later, Jamaican-born Lloyd "Lindy" Delapenha made an impact playing for Middlesbrough between 1950 and 1957, becoming a leading goal scorer and the first Black player to win a championship medal. However, it was not until the 1970s that African-Caribbean players began to make a major impact on the game. Clyde Best (West Ham United 1969–1976), born in Bermuda, paved the way for players such as Cyrille Regis (born in French Guiana), and Luther Blissett (born in Jamaica). Blissett and Regis joined Viv Anderson to form the first wave of Black footballers to play for the England national team. Although the number of players of African-Caribbean origin in the English league was increasing far beyond proportions in wider society, when Black players represented the England national team, they still had to endure racial attacks at home and abroad. When selected to play for England, Regis received a bullet through the mail with the threat: "You'll get one of these through your knees if you step on our Wembley turf."

By the 1980s the British African-Caribbean community was well represented at all playing levels of the game. John Barnes, born in Jamaica, was one of the most talented players of his generation and one of the few footballers to win every honour in the domestic English game including the PFA Players' Player of the Year. Although Barnes played for England on 78 occasions between 1983 and 1991, his performances rarely matched his club standard. Subsequently, Barnes identified a culture of racism in football during his era as a player. Players of African-Caribbean origin continued to excel in English football, in the 1990s Paul Ince – whose parents were from Trinidad – went on to captain Manchester United, Liverpool and the England national team. The contribution was reciprocated when a number of British born footballers including Robbie Earle, Frank Sinclair and Darryl Powell represented the Jamaica national football team in the 1998 World Cup finals.

At the turn of the millennium, British-born Black footballers constituted about 13% of the English league, and a number of groups including "Kick It Out" were highlighting issues of racism still in the game. In the 2006 World Cup finals, Theo Walcott, a striker of English and Jamaican parents, became the youngest ever player to join an England World Cup squad – a side that included African-Caribbean players in every department, goal-keeping, defence, midfield and attack. The England football squad for the 2006 world cup also contained Ashley Cole (Barbadian father), Rio Ferdinand (father from St. Lucia) Sol Campbell (Jamaican parents) alongside goalkeeper David James, Jermaine Jenas and Aaron Lennon, all with ancestors from the Caribbean. Tyrone Mings, Marcus Rashford, Raheem Sterling and Kyle Walker are some of the British African-Caribbeans who represented England in 2021.

==== Motorsports ====
Lewis Hamilton, whose paternal grandparents immigrated from Grenada, won the 2008 Formula One World Championship, in only his second season in the sport; and, after narrowly finishing second in his debut season. He won the Drivers' Championship again in 2014, 2015, 2017, 2018, 2019 and 2020 becoming the most successful British driver in the history of Formula One. Hamilton is of Afro-Grenadian and English descent.

==== Rugby league and union ====
Clive Sullivan, who had both Jamaican and Antiguan heritage, captained the Great Britain team which won the 1972 Rugby League World Cup. Sullivan was the first black captain for a Great Britain team, in any sport. Part of the 2003 Rugby World Cup victory, Jason Robinson was the first African-Caribbean to captain the England rugby union side. He is of Afro-Jamaican and Scottish descent, and his biological son Lewis Tierney has the same background with also English ancestry. Ellery Hanley, who has Jamaican heritage, became the first man to captain his side to three consecutive Challenge Cup victories. Hanley is the only player to win the coveted Man of Steel award on three occasions and is widely considered to be one of the greatest players in rugby league history.

Jimmy Peters, who was of partial Jamaican descent, was the first black man to play rugby union for England. Another England international rugby union player, Danny Cipriani is of Afro-Trinidadian, Italian and English ancestry. Jeremy Guscott, who is of Afro-Jamaican and English descent, played for Bath, England and the British and Irish Lions. Other professional players of Afro-Jamaican heritage include Ashton Golding, Michael Lawrence, Umyla Hanley, Anthony Sullivan, Des Drummond and Ben Jones-Bishop.

== Cultural influence ==
=== Carnivals and celebrations ===
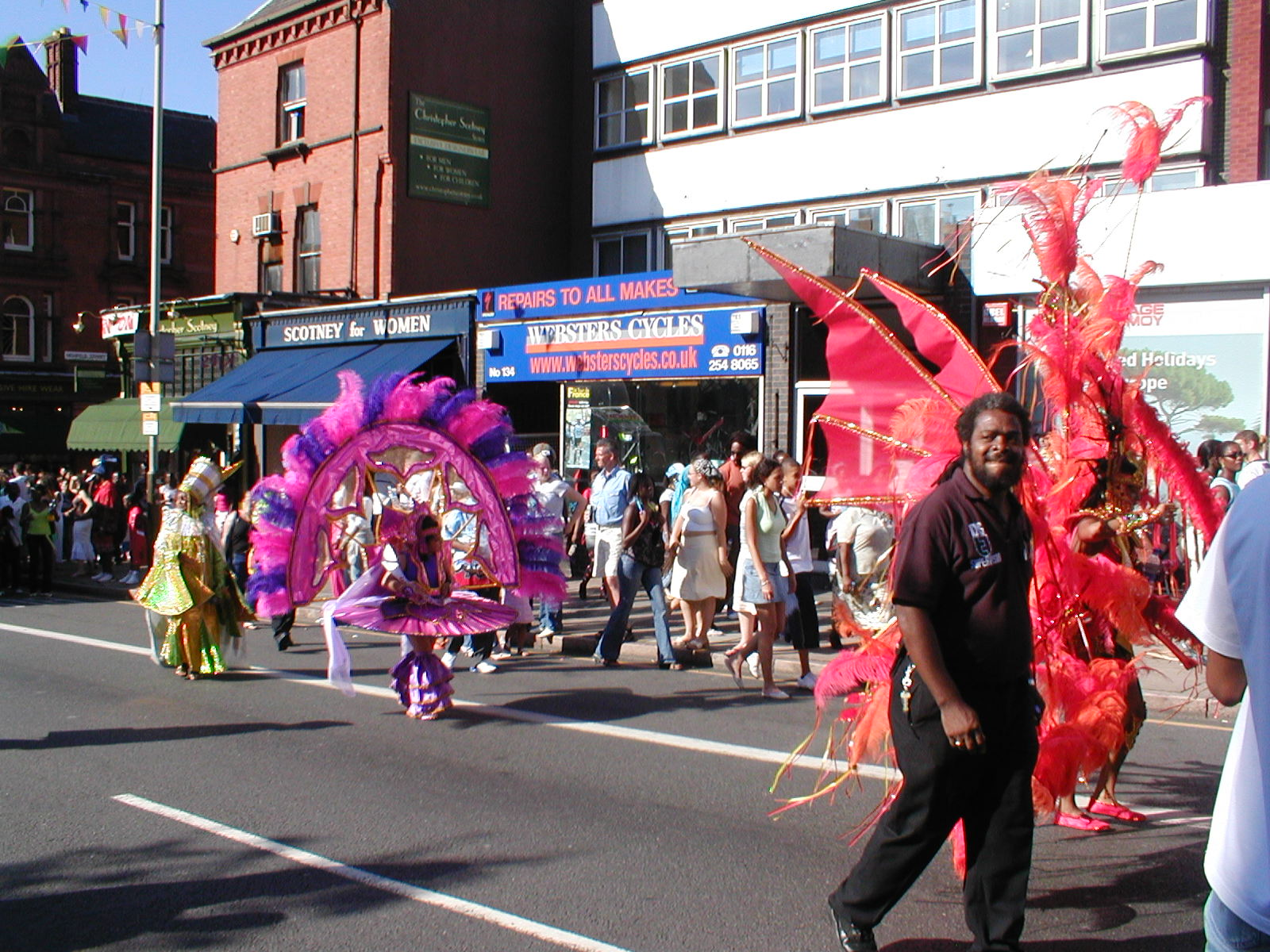
The Leicester Caribbean Carnival

African-Caribbean communities organise and participate in Caribbean Carnivals (Caribbean-style carnivals) throughout the UK. The best known of these is the annual Notting Hill Carnival, attracting up to 1.5 million people from Britain and around the world, making it the largest street festival in Europe. The carnival began in 1964 as a small procession of Trinidadians in memory of festivals in their home country. In 2006 the carnival was voted onto the list of icons of England.

Luton Carnival, which has taken place since 1976, is the largest one day carnival in the UK (it is second only to Notting Hill carnival, which takes place over two days). Leeds West Indian Carnival is Europe's oldest West Indian carnival and now attracts around 130,000 people. Other carnivals include the Leicester Caribbean Carnival and the Birmingham International Carnival.

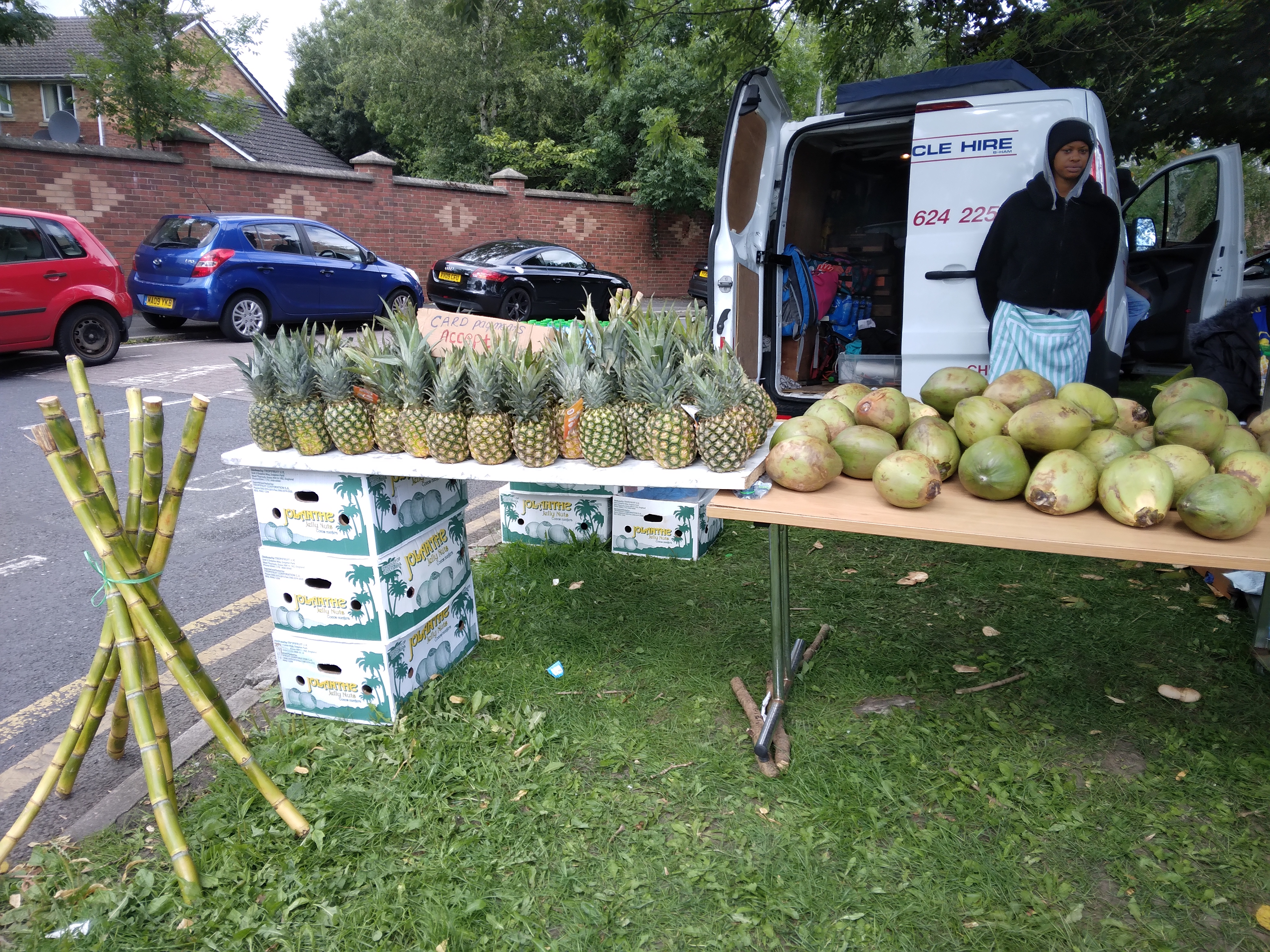
Exotic fruits for sale in Moss Side during the Manchester Caribbean Carnival, 2023

In 2018, following campaigns and a petition started by Patrick Vernon for 22 June to be recognised as a national day to commemorate and celebrate migration and migrant communities in Britain, and at the height of the Windrush scandal, it was announced by the British government that an annual Windrush Day would be held, supported by a grant of up to £500,000, to recognise and honour the contribution of those who arrived between 1948 and 1971 and to "keep their legacy alive for future generations, ensuring that we all celebrate the diversity of Britain's history."

The Windrush Festival in London was created in 2018 as a way for home-grown Black businesses and Caribbean-British born Windrush Generation performers to have a platform to celebrate their culture and presence in Britain. The main event Radiate Windrush Festival is always held on the last weekend of June to follow on from National Windrush Day, other festivals across the country are held generally in the month of June or July.

=== Cuisine ===
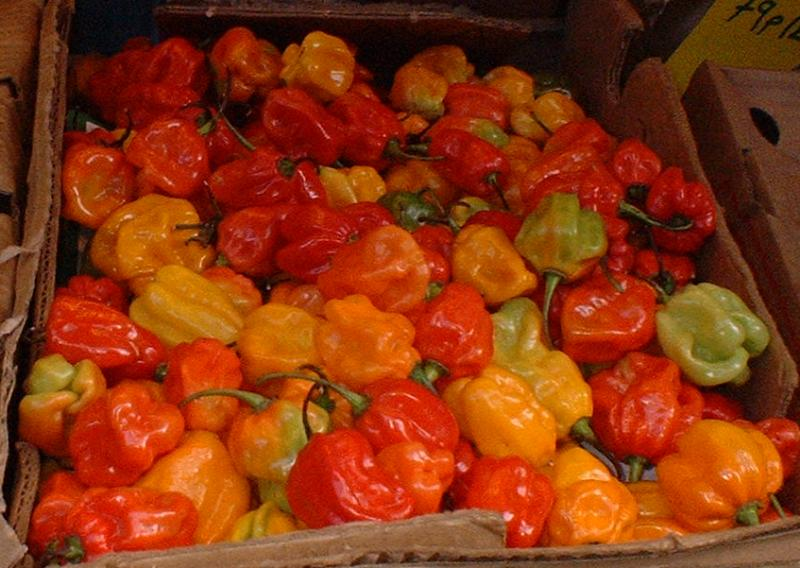
Scotch bonnet peppers imported from the Caribbean on sale at London's Brixton Market. The peppers are a key ingredient of jerk dishes.

The earliest Caribbean immigrants to post-war Britain found differences in diet and availability of food an uncomfortable challenge. and many people longed for a "taste of home". In later years, as the community developed and food imports became more accessible to all, grocers specialising in Caribbean produce opened in British high streets. Caribbean restaurants can now also be found in most areas of Britain where West Indian communities reside, serving traditional Caribbean dishes such as curried goat, fried dumplings, ackee and salt fish (the national dish of Jamaica), Pelau (the national dish of Trinidad and Tobago), Cou-Cou and Flying Fish (the national dish of Barbados), Pudding and Souse, as well as Fish Cakes from Barbados, the spices known as "jerk", and the traditional Sunday West Indian meal of rice and peas.

The best-known Caribbean food brands in the UK are Jamaican Sun, Tropical Sun, Dunn's River and Grace. In March 2007, Grace foods bought ENCO Products, owners of the Dunn's River Brand, as well as Nurishment, and the Encona Sauce Range. Tropical Sun products have been widely available in the UK for more than two decades and there is a sister brand, Jamaica Sun, with products sourced exclusively from Jamaica. The most popular brands can now often be found in the large supermarkets; although the full range continues to be offered only by the local ethnic stores, the interest by the mainstream supermarkets reflects the wider population's interest in ethnic and more lately Afro-Caribbean foods. Caribbean food topped a (2015) list of the types of cuisine British diners would like to see more of on menus.

According to a report by the Caribbean Export Development Agency (Caribbean Export), the number of Caribbean restaurants in the UK tripled in the 12 months leading up to August 2019.

=== Community centres ===
In many parts of Britain, African-Caribbean people have been recognised as being part of a distinct community. In the 1950s and 1960s, community centres and associations sprung up in some British towns and cities with an aim to serve African-Caribbean populations. One such example was the African Caribbean Self Help Organisation (ACSHO), founded in 1994 in the district of Handsworth in Birmingham. Responsibilities included arranging social events, such as festivals, carnivals and coach trips, which helped bring the communities together. Large centres presently operating include the Leeds West Indian centre and the Manchester West Indian centre. Typical of present-day centres is the Afro Caribbean Millennium Centre in Birmingham, which was established with National Lottery funding to support principally Caribbean people in areas such as employment, housing, education, immigration, and cultural issues.

=== Religious activity ===
The influx of African-Caribbean people to the United Kingdom was accompanied by religious practices more common to the North American continent. In Britain, many African-Caribbean people continued to practise Non-conformist Protestant denominations with an Evangelical influence such as Pentecostalism and Seventh Day Baptism. African-Caribbean people have supported new churches in many areas of the country, which have grown to act as social centres for the community. Mike Phillips, writing for the UK national archive project, described the influences of the new churches thus; "[they] gave the entire Caribbean community a sense of stability. At a time when migrants were under severe psychological pressure and distrusted the official services, or were misunderstood when they went to them, the Black church groups offered invaluable advice and comfort." In 2005, The Economist magazine discussed the growth of evangelical churches in London and Birmingham; "Another reason is that Britain's most prominent Afro-Caribbean institutions – the Black evangelical churches – are dominated by the urban poor. That has to do with the way the Caribbean was missionised: the hotter brand of Christianity gained most converts among the dispossessed, who then re-exported it to Britain." The manner of worship in some of these churches is more akin to that of African-American practices than to traditional English Catholic or Anglican liturgy. Gospel music also came to play a part in British cultural life. African-Caribbean people played a central role establishing British gospel choirs, most notably the London Community Gospel Choir.

Some British African-Caribbean people continue to practise other religious beliefs such as Rastafari, which developed in Jamaica. The Rastafarian belief system, associated personal symbols such as dreadlocks and cultural practices concerning cannabis have influenced British society far beyond the African-Caribbean community, being adopted by both white British and others.

=== Language and dialect ===
English is the official language of the former British West Indies, therefore African-Caribbean immigrants had few communication difficulties upon arrival in the UK compared to immigrants from other regions. As integration continued, African-West Indians born in Britain instinctively adopted hybrid dialects combining Caribbean and local British dialects. These dialects and accents gradually entered mainstream British vernacular, and shades of Caribbean dialects can be heard among Britons regardless of cultural origin. A Lancaster University study has identified an emergence in certain areas of Britain of a distinctive accent which borrows heavily from Jamaican creole.

=== Literature ===
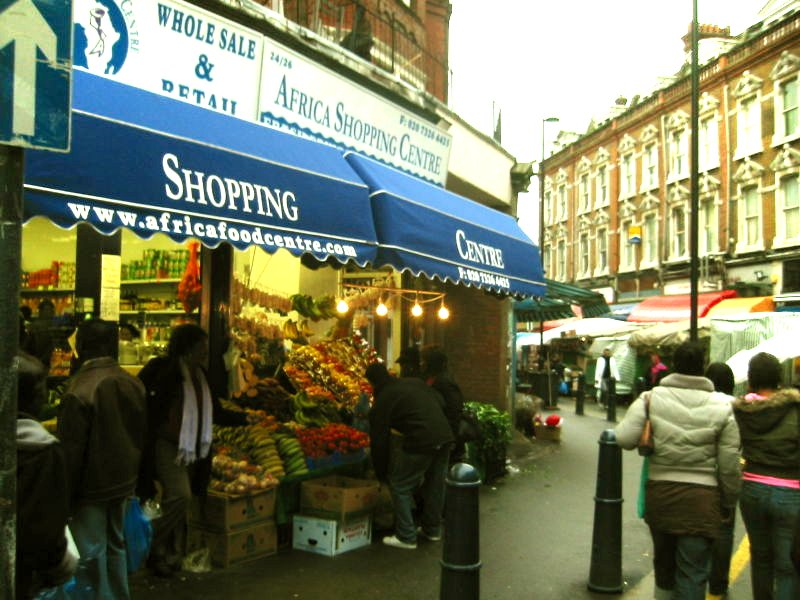
A shop in Electric Avenue, Brixton. In 1999 the street was hit by a nail bomb planted by the Neo-Nazi David Copeland, who targeted the local African-Caribbean community.

Jamaican poet James Berry was one of the first Caribbean writers to come to Britain after the 1948 British Nationality Act. He was followed by writers including Barbadians George Lamming and Edward Kamau Brathwaite, Trinidadians Samuel Selvon and C. L. R. James, Jamaican Andrew Salkey and the Guyanese writer Wilson Harris. These writers viewed London as the centre of the English literary scene, and took advantage of the BBC Radio show Caribbean Voices to gain attention and be published. By relocating to Britain, these writers also gave Caribbean literature an international readership for the first time and established Caribbean writing as an important perspective within English literature.

Some Caribbean writers also began writing about the hardships faced by settlers in post-war Britain. Lamming addressed these issues in his 1954 novel The Emigrants, which traced the journey of migrants from Barbados as they struggled to integrate into British life. Selvon's novel The Lonely Londoners (1956) details the life of West Indians in post-World War II London. Writing much later, Ferdinand Dennis both in his journalism and novels, such as The Sleepless Summer (1989) and The Last Blues Dance (1996), deals with "an older generation of Caribbean immigrants, whose narratives, stoical and unpolemical, rarely find expression".

By the mid-1980s, a more radical wave of writers and poets were addressing the African-Caribbean experience in Britain, promoted by a group of new mainly black-led publishing houses such as Akira, Karia Press (founded by Buzz Johnson), Dangaroo Press, and Karnak House (founded by Amon Saba Saakana), alongside the older established New Beacon Books (founded in 1966 by John La Rose), Allison & Busby (founded in 1967 by Margaret Busby) and Bogle-L'Ouverture Publications (founded in 1969 by Jessica Huntley), and the International Book Fair of Radical Black and Third World Books (1982–95).

In 1984, the poet Fred D'Aguiar (born in London to Guyanese parents) won the T. S. Eliot Prize, and in 1994 won the Whitbread First Novel Award for The Longest Memory. Linton Kwesi Johnson's rhyming and socio-political commentary over dub beats – including such favourites as "Dread Beat An' Blood" and "Inglan Is A Bitch" – made him the unofficial poet laureate of the British African-Caribbean community. Another dub poet, Benjamin Zephaniah, born in Birmingham to Jamaican parents, overcame a spell in prison to become a well-known writer and public figure. In 2003 he declined an OBE, stating that it reminded him of "thousands of years of brutality, it reminds me of how my foremothers were raped and my forefathers brutalised".

African-Caribbean British writers have achieved recent literary acclaim. In 2004, Andrea Levy's novel Small Island won the Whitbread Book of the Year and the Orange Prize for Fiction, one of Britain's highest literary honours. The book also earned her the 2005 Commonwealth Writers' Prize. Levy, born in London to Jamaican parents, is the author of four novels, each exploring the problems faced by Black British-born children of Jamaican emigrants. In 2005, Dreda Say Mitchell became the first black British writer to be awarded the Crime Writers Association's John Creasey Dagger for her debut book Running Hot. The book drew upon Mitchell's experiences of working with prisoners and is a chase thriller about a young man trying to break the cycle of going to prison. Mitchell is of Grenadian extraction. In 2006 Zadie Smith won the Anisfield-Wolf Book Award, the Commonwealth Writers' Best Book Award (Eurasia Section) and the Orange Prize for On Beauty. Smith's acclaimed first novel, White Teeth (2000), was a portrait of contemporary multicultural London, drawing from her own upbringing with an English father and a Jamaican mother. White Teeth was an international best seller and won multiple accolades, including the James Tait Black Memorial Prize for fiction, the Whitbread Book Award in category best first novel, the Guardian First Book Award and the Betty Trask Award. Time magazine included the novel in its list of the 100 best English-language novels from 1923 to 2005.

The UK also has a modest output of African-Caribbean popular fiction. A widely known example is Yardie, a work of Urban fiction written by Victor Headley in 1992, describing the life of a Jamaican courier carrying cocaine from Jamaica to London. The book was published by Steve Pope and Dotun Adebayo of Xpress books. Spare Room was Dedra Say Mitchell's first psychological thriller. Published in 2019, the book became a critically acclaimed international best seller. At the 2020 British Book Awards, Candice Carty-Williams became the first black woman to win the "Book of the Year" accolade, for her novel Queenie. The novel, which describes the life and loves of Queenie Jenkins, a vibrant, young British-Jamaican, received positive reviews and was marketed as "a black Bridget Jones". Queenie entered the Sunday Times Bestseller hardback chart at number two and went on to win numerous accolades.

=== Media ===
The Voice newspaper was the primary African-Caribbean newspaper in Britain, and was founded in the early 1980s by Val McCalla. However, today it is owned by a Jamaican publisher and has a Caribbean focus. Pride magazine, which has been going for 21 years, is the largest lifestyle magazine for the community and was described by The Guardian newspaper as the dominant lifestyle magazine for the black community in the UK for more than 15 years. Its owner Pride Media also specialises in helping organisations target the community through a range of media. Other publications have included the Gleaner, Black Voice, New Editor and The Caribbean Times. The growth of such media is a response to the perceived imbalances of "mainstream" media. In 2006, Sir Ian Blair, Chief Commissioner of London's Metropolitan Police, joined a long list of commentators in branding the mainstream media as "institutionally racist" for its alleged failure to offer a proper balance in reporting affairs related to the community.

Trinidad-born Sir Trevor McDonald is one of the community's best-known journalists, having been the main presenter (newscaster) for the national ITV network for more than 20 years. Other notable media figures include Gary Younge, The Guardian columnist, Clive Myrie, Gillian Joseph, Charlene White, Darren Jordon and Moira Stuart, the veteran BBC news presenter. Trinidadian-born Darcus Howe wrote regularly in the New Statesman and fronted a number of documentary series, including the Channel 4 current affairs programme Devil's Advocate. Much of Howe's work related to the experiences of British African-Caribbean people and racism faced by the Black community. Other notable producer/directors are Terry Jervis (Jervis Media) and Pogus Caesar (Windrush Productions); both have made multicultural, entertainment and sports programmes for Carlton TV, BBC TV and Channel 4.

The community has a tradition of "underground" pirate radio broadcasters. Among the most established are London's Lightning Radio, Genesis Radio and Galaxy Radio, which play a mix of ragga, reggae, bashment, hip hop, and R&B. Pirate radio stations such as Supreme Radio, Galaxy Radio (which calls itself "the only de-brainwashing station"), Genesis Radio (known as "the people's station" or "the black power station"), and the more recently emerged radio station Omega FM Radio are particularly regarded in the Afro Caribbean community for playing a variety of music such as soca, soul, dancehall, jazz, hip hop, reveail, and Funky House, but also for dedicating time to have "talk shows" and "information shows". This gives the community an opportunity to phone and participate in an array of subjects that mainstream radio, wider media, and even other pirate radio stations refuse to address.

In 2002, the BBC established its digital broadcasting strand, BBC Radio 1Xtra, to focus on new Black music – which in effect means catering to the tastes of the country's African-Caribbean youth. The Internet has afforded the community the opportunity to publish en-masse, and there are now thousands of websites and blogs produced by or for African-Caribbean people in the UK such as the BBC's Family History page, and The African-Caribbean Network, Blacknet UK, launched in 1996.

Award-winning Myrna Loy, a female poet and published writer who has recited poetry alongside Linton Kwesi Johnson is a poet in her own right. Her poetry radiates passion for political situations, rages against hypocrisy and abuse and balances it with appreciation and gratitude. She came second in the Bridport Prize, which is one of the UK's notable and prestigious poetry competitions; and came second for her poem "The Last Poem", performed at the Castillo Centre in Manhattan. Loy is three-times published, her book The Other Side of Tourism shares her conflict between her British and Jamaican roots, and her two poetry books Poetry's Teacher and Poetry's Promise share her person and professional life experiences. As a Black Briton, she says: "British culture teaches us to conform, to hide our light under a bushel, to not sing our praises, so as a result I reveal "my light" through my poetry, paintings and my quarterly magazine called Blackbright News, which celebrates the wonderful works Black People (not only in Britain) have done. I may eventually be relegated to the area where tyrants and revolutions belong, but in the meantime, I intend to shout from the roof-tops what I feel and why I feel it!" Myrna (aka Lady Loy) is a radio presenter on Jamrock Radio, and uses this arena to promote black music and black talent.

=== Musical impact ===
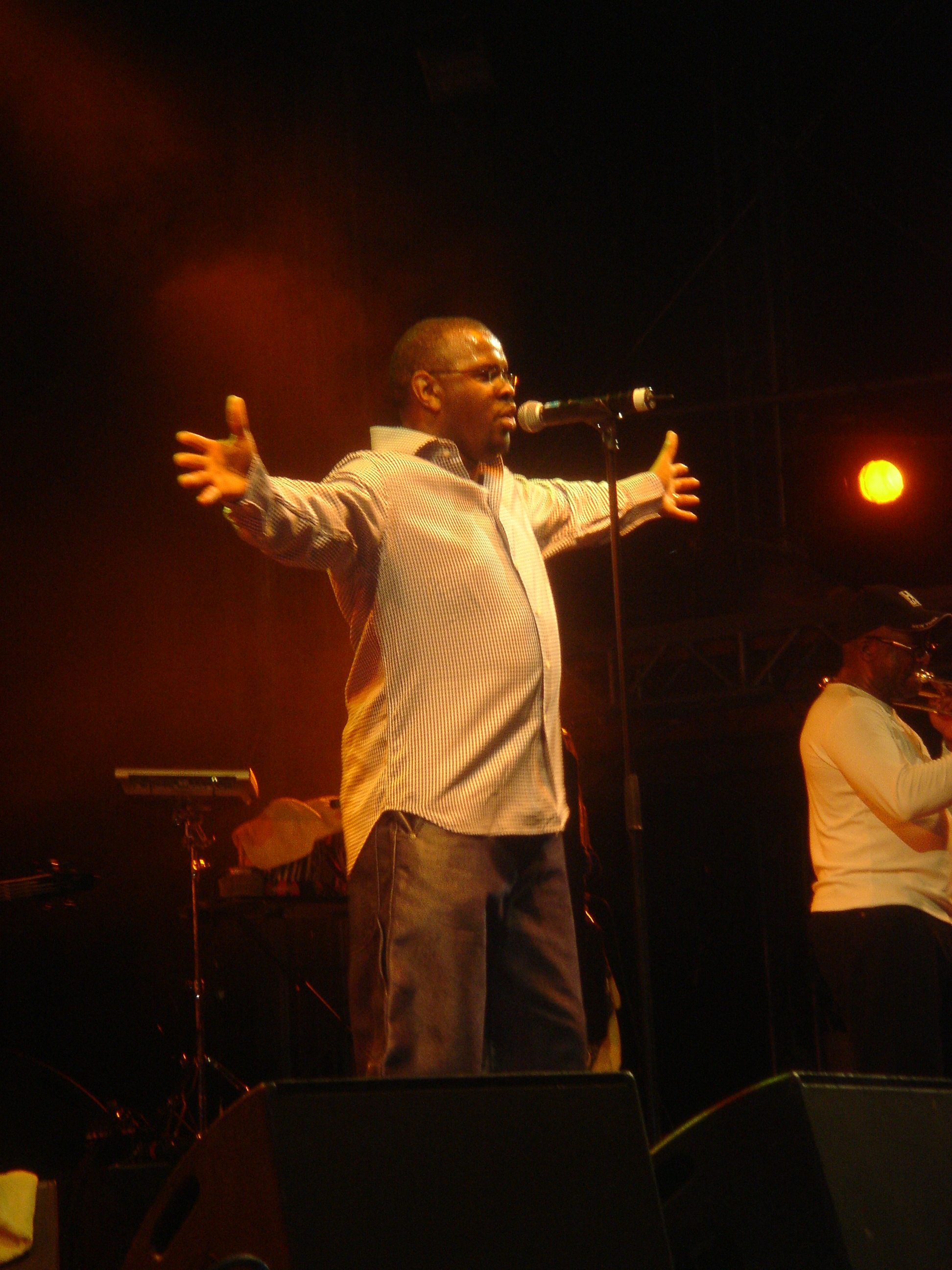
The former Musical Youth frontman Dennis Seaton in 2005

The period of large-scale immigration brought many new musical styles to the United Kingdom. These styles gained popularity amongst Britons of all cultural origins, and aided Caribbean music in gaining international recognition. The earliest of these exponents was the calypso artist Lord Kitchener, who arrived in Britain on the Windrush in 1948 accompanied by fellow musician Lord Beginner. Already a star in his native Trinidad, Lord Kitchener got an immediate booking at the only West Indian club in London. Six months later, he was appearing in three clubs nightly, and his popularity extended beyond the West Indian and African nightclub audiences, to include music hall and variety show audiences. Kitchener's recording "London is the place for me" exemplified the experience of the Windrush generation. Other calypso musicians began to collaborate with African Kwela musicians and British jazz players in London clubs.

Jamaican music styles reached Britain in the 1960s, becoming the staple music for young British African-Caribbean people. Tours by ska artists such as Prince Buster and the Skatalites fed the growing British-Caribbean music scene, and the success of Jamaican artists Millie Small, Desmond Dekker and Bob and Marcia propelled Caribbean music and people into mainstream cultural life. British African-Caribbean people followed the changing styles of Jamaican music and began to produce homegrown music appealing to both Black and White communities. In 1968, The Cats released a cover of Swan Lake, which became the first Top 50 by a British reggae group and the following year, the British African-Caribbean ska band Symarip recorded "Skinhead Moonstomp" – a cover of the Derrick Morgan song Moon Hop – which had a huge effect on the British ska scene. The ska sound and rude boy imagery inspired a generation of White working-class youths (especially mods and skinheads), and later helped spawn Britain's multi-cultural 2 Tone movement in the late-1970s.

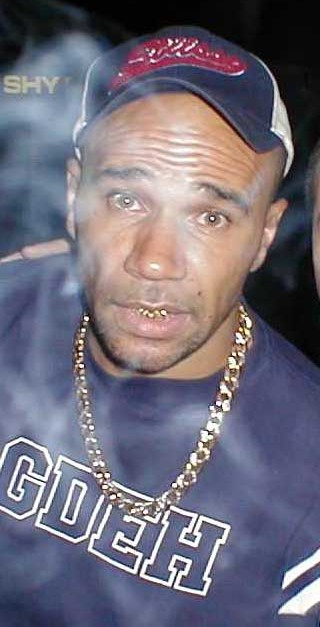
The DJ and musician Goldie, born to Scottish and Jamaican parents

As Jamaican ska gave way to the slower styles of rocksteady and the more politicised reggae, British African-Caribbean people followed suit. Sound systems to rival those in Jamaica sprung up throughout communities, and "Blues parties" – parties in private houses, where one paid at the door – became an institution. The arrival of Bob Marley to London in 1971 helped spawn a Black British music industry based on reggae. His association with the Rastafarian movement influenced waves of young people, reared in Britain, to discover their Caribbean roots. British Barbadian Dennis Bovell became Britain's prominent reggae band leader and producer, working with many international reggae stars, and introducing a reggae flavour to the British pop charts with non-reggae acts such as: Dexys Midnight Runners and Bananarama. Bovell also worked extensively with London-based dub poet Linton Kwesi Johnson.

British music with reggae roots prospered in the 1980s and early-1990s. British African-Caribbean artists Musical Youth, Aswad, Maxi Priest and Eddy Grant had major commercial successes, and the multicultural band UB40 helped promote reggae to an international audience. Birmingham-based Steel Pulse became one of the world's foremost exponents of roots reggae and accompanying black consciousness, their 1978 debut album Handsworth Revolution becoming a seminal release.

British African-Caribbean music had been generally synonymous with Caribbean styles until the 1990s, although some artists had been drawing on British and American musical forms for several decades. In the 1970s and 1980s, British African-Caribbean artists such as Hot Chocolate and Imagination became leaders of the British disco, soul and R&B scenes. By the mid-1980s, British African-Caribbean people were also incorporating American hip-hop and House styles, becoming leading figures in Britain's developing dance music culture. This led to an explosion of musical forms. British artists created musical hybrids combining many elements including European techno, Jamaican dancehall, dub, breakbeats and contemporary American R&B. These unique blends began to gain international acclaim through the success of Soul II Soul and the multi-racial Massive Attack.

British African-Caribbean people were at the leading edge of the jungle and drum and bass movements of the 1990s. Although the fast-tempo drums and loud intricate bass lines sounded fresh, Caribbean roots could still be detected. Pioneers in the electronic dance music scene of the early 90s include producers 4 hero, Goldie and Roni Size, all of whom are of Jamaican heritage. British African-Caribbean musicians and DJs were at the forefront of the UK garage and Grime scenes.

== Social and political issues ==
=== Discrimination and racism ===
Historically, community centres have sought to address issues that arise within the community, including problems of police harassment and concerns about the housing of African Caribbeans, which was viewed as discriminatory during the early decades of mass immigration. One such community centre was the Gloucestershire West Indian Association, which was formed in 1962. The formation of this group was in response to a number of issues that arose within the community at this time. These included problems around police harassment and concerns about the housing of Black people on certain council estates in the city, which was viewed as discrimination and segregation. The centres also allowed African-Caribbean peoples to socialise without risking the potential racial discrimination and aggression of "unfriendly pubs". Many of these associations appointed a Community Relations Officer, whose role was to liaise between the community and wider British society, including the establishment.

Although the community does not face any official or informal restrictions on political participation, Britons of Caribbean origin are under-represented in local and national politics. British African-West Indians have long asserted that they encounter discriminatory barriers to most middle- and higher-status occupations, as well as discrimination in hiring practices at all levels of employment. There is also considerable evidence that African-Caribbean people experience differential treatment at the hands of public officials, the British courts and penal system, and the police. Studies have proposed that the isolation of certain regional urban areas by financial institutions such as insurance brokers disproportionately affects the community to its detriment.

Britain's school system, despite efforts to address issues of discrimination, has often been accused of being racially biased to a perceived lack of representation of Black history and culture in the cirricula. Grenadian author Bernard Coard published How the West Indian Child Is Made Educationally Sub-normal in the British School System in May 1971. For example, the distinct Caribbean dialects, creoles and patois (patwah) spoken by many African-Caribbean immigrants and their descendants, have been problematic in the field of education. In a study by language and education specialist professor Viv Edwards, The West Indian language issue in British schools, language – the Creole spoken by the students – was singled out as an important factor disadvantaging Caribbean children in British schools. The study cited negative attitudes of teachers towards any non-standard variety, noting that:

The teacher who does not or is not prepared to recognise the problems of the Creole-speaking child in a British English situation can only conclude that he is stupid when he gives either an inappropriate response or no response at all. The stereotyping process leads features of Creole to be stigmatised and to develop connotations of, amongst other things, low academic ability.

The Cowper Street School strike took place in Chapeltown, Leeds, on 25 June 1973. Organised by parents of black children, students were removed from school for one day in protest at the poor conditions in the school and alleged racist attitudes of the headteacher.Described by historian Olivia Wyatt as "unprecedented in Leeds, the strike itself showed the dedication that black parents in Chapeltown had to the education of their children.

Although there are hundreds of African-Caribbean teachers in the UK, it has been suggested that their under-representation in inner-city schools is a major factor in the failure, particularly of secondary-level schools, to achieve a satisfactory average of achievement for the community's children (see Bernard Coard and the Swann Report of 1985).

=== Business ===
In 2004, Greater London Authority Economics produced a report to examine the economic contribution black businesses made to London's economy. The report found that black businesses made up 4% of all London's businesses, provided more than 70,000 jobs and had a total turnover of almost £4.5 billion. Of this total, 42% of the businesses were owned by Black Caribbeans or those of partial Black Caribbean origin.

Businesses owned by Africans and Caribbeans generate more than £10bn for the UK each year, according to the Centre for Research in Ethnic Minority Entrepreneurship (CREME).

Notable high profile Black Caribbean business successes include Levi Roots, whose Reggae Reggae sauce and Levi Roots brand has grown into a multi-million pound enterprise. Wilfred Emmanuel-Jones' The Black Farmer range of food products has annual revenues of more than £7m. Pat McGrath Labs has an estimated value of $1 billion.

== See also ==
- African and Caribbean War Memorial
- African American British
- Afro-Caribbean people
- Belizean British
- British Indo-Caribbean people
- British national identity card
- Museumand: The National Caribbean Heritage Museum
- New Nation, an Afro-Caribbean newspaper
