= Museumand =

Group celebrating Caribbean heritage in the UK

Museumand: The National Caribbean Heritage Museum is a group that celebrates the contribution of British African-Caribbean people to life in the United Kingdom. The group is a "museum without walls" based in Nottingham, and who work with communities there and elsewhere, including mounting exhibitions in museums, universities and other places. It was founded in 2015 by Catherine Ross as the SKN (Skills Knowledge and Networks) cultural museum, and Museumand is a subsidiary of the SKN Heritage Museum Community interest company.

In 2016, Museumand was invited to be part of the University of Oxford's Oxford and Colonialism Working Group. In July 2016, as SKN Heritage Museum, they launched an exhibition 52 Genres and Counting at the Splendour in Nottingham festival. The exhibition celebrated Black British music since 1947, and toured to the Bass Festival in Birmingham and Soul Fest in Liverpool.

In 2017 and 2018, Museumand collaborated in the University of Leicester Centre for New Writing's "Caribbean Journeys" project, resulting in a book Caribbean Journeys (2018, ISBN 9781527219212), an anthology of the writings of Caribbean elders recording their life experiences.

In 2017, Museumand hosted Caribbean Conversations, a series of 8 programmes on local television station Notts TV.

In 2018, the National Trust Museum of Childhood at Sudbury Hall, Derbyshire, hosted an exhibition of "Black Dolls: The Power of Representation" in conjunction with Museumand.

In 2019, Museumand's film White Gold; the story of sugar, slavery and settlement in the Caribbean was published in Feast online magazine, in issue #1 on the theme of sugar.

In 2021, Museumand partnered with the University of Lincoln's "Reimagining Lincolnshire" project to produce a four-day event in Lincoln including a performance "Hidden Stories: From the Caribbean to Great Britain".

70 Objeks & Tings is an exhibition and book which tell the story of the "Windrush generation" through their familiar objects and other aspects of their daily lives. The book Objeks & Tings was launched on Windrush Day in 2020, with online publication of its first section, on food, although COVID-19 had prevented the planned programme of workshops to gather and develop material for the book. The exhibition was on display at the Streetlife Museum in Hull in 2021 during Black History Month, and at Nottingham Castle when it reopened in 2023, and the book of the same title was available for sale there. Twelve episodes of an associated podcast Objeks & Tings were produced in June-September 2023 and were chosen by The Guardian as one of its "podcasts of the week".

Museumand's exhibition Pardner Hand: A Caribbean answer to British banking exclusion was displayed at the Bank of England Museum, London in 2023 and 2024, opening on Windrush Day in June 2023, and the museum published a series of blogs by Museumand's founders to accompany the exhibition.

The group's founder, Catherine Ross, who came to the UK in 1958 from Saint Kitts at the age of seven, is its director and her daughter Lynda-Louise Burrell is its creative director.
