= Catherine Ross (Museumand) =

British educator and museum director (born 1951)

Catherine Ross (born 1951) is a British educator and museum director. Originally from Saint Kitts, Ross founded Museumand, a "museum without walls" celebrating British African-Caribbean people's contributions to the United Kingdom, in 2015.

== Biography ==
Catherine Ross was born on Saint Kitts in 1951. At age 7, in 1958, she came to the United Kingdom as a member of the Windrush generation, and settled with her family in Nottingham.

After a career as an English teacher, Ross became involved in working to educate British descendants of her fellow Windrush generation members about their Caribbean heritage. She was inspired after seeing her students struggling with their identities and dealing with low self-esteem.

In 2015, she founded SKN Heritage Museum, now renamed Museumand: The National Caribbean Heritage Museum. She works as the director of the Nottingham-based "museum without walls," the first in the U.K. to celebrate Caribbean heritage. The museum's collection in based on artifacts that Ross compiled relating to Caribbean culture and the Windrush history.

During the COVID-19 pandemic, Ross and her daughter, Lynda-Louise Burrell, wrote the book 70 Objeks, which shared knowledge from the Windrush generation for future generations. In 2023, the two women started a podcast called Objeks & Tings, aiming to share Caribbean culture and stories. Ross has also hosted similar dialogues on the local TV show Caribbean Conversations.
