= Ceri Peach =

Welsh geographer

- Born: 26 October 1939; Bridgend, Wales
- Died: 3 October 2018 (aged 78); Abingdon, Berkshire
- Education: University of Oxford (Bachelor of Arts, DPhil)
- Known for: Social geography
- Awards: Doctorate of Letters, Ethnic Geography Distinguished Scholar of 2008
- Scientific career
- Fields: Social geography
- Workplaces: University of Oxford; University of Manchester; Australian National University; Yale University

Guthlac Ceri Klaus Peach (26 October 1939 – 3 October 2018) was a geographer from Bridgend, Wales. He was an undergraduate (BA 1961), graduate student (DPhil, 1964), and lecturer at Merton College, Oxford before being appointed to a lectureship in geography at St Catherine's College, Oxford (known colloquially as St Catz) in 1965 at the age of 26. He held this post jointly with a lectureship at Keble College, Oxford and a Faculty Lectureship at the University of Oxford.

He was elected as a tutorial fellow (teaching fellow) in geography at St Catherine's in 1969 and also held various non-teaching posts, including several college offices: Domestic Bursar, Senior Tutor, Finance Bursar and Acting Master. During his tenure as Senior Tutor, women were first admitted to the college. As Domestic Bursar, he negotiated college charges with the then Junior Common Room President, Peter Mandelson.

He was Professor of Social geography at the School of Geography and the Environment, University of Oxford from 1992 to 2007 and on retirement from his Oxford chair he was appointed Professor of at the Institute for Social Change at the University of Manchester.

== Time at St Catherine's College ==
Peach found the move from Merton, Oxford's oldest college, to St Catherine's (known as St Catz), Oxfords newest college, to be liberating:

“When I arrived, Catz was still being built, the yew hedges in the quad were only knee-high, the Fellows were newly appointed and the drive was underway to make the college great."

During his time at St Catherine's the number of undergraduate geographers accepted by the college increased from 4 each year to between 10 and 12. The University Schools results also became some of the best in the arts subjects at the college. Notable students taught by Ceri Peach include Denis Cosgrove, who went on to become Alexander von Humboldt Professor of Geography at University of California, Los Angeles; Mike Walker and Geoff Duller, who went on to become professors of geography at the University of Wales; Mike Summerfield, Professor of Physical Geography at the University of Edinburgh; Vaughan Robinson, professor at King's College London; Michael Keith, professor of sociology at Goldsmiths, University of London; Gary Bridge, professor at Cardiff University, Chris Keylock, professor of fluid mechanics at Loughborough University, and Dr Margaret Byron, teaching fellow at the University of Leicester.

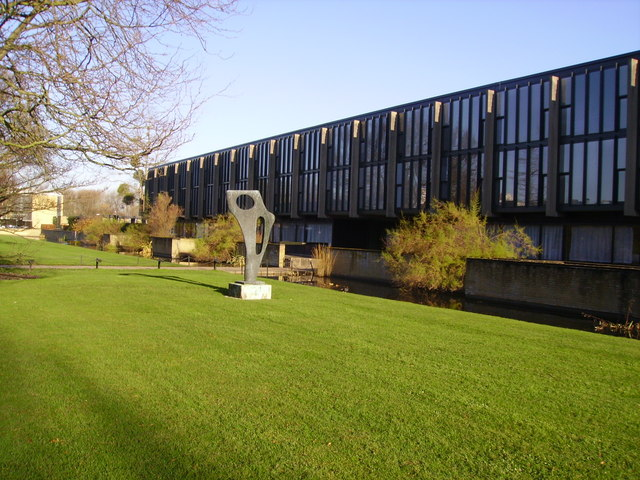
St Catherine's College, Oxford

Other graduates in geography taught by Peach at St Catherine's have achieved success in other fields and include Matthew Pinsent, who received four gold medals for rowing in successive Olympic Games.

== Field of research ==
Peach's main field of research was human migration and the racial segregation of minority groups, ethnic groups and religious groups in the United Kingdom, the United States and Western Europe.

During his sabbatical at the Demography Department of Australian National University, in 1973, his understanding of the relationship between spatial patterns of residential segregation was transformed. This led him to investigate ethnic intermarriage as an index of social interaction.

During his next sabbatical at Yale University, in 1977, he disproved the 'triple melting pot theory' of American cultural assimilation which, based on data collection in New Haven, Connecticut, argued that while national ethnic identity in the United States would dissolve, it would do so within maintained religious boundaries of Catholic, Protestant and Jewish. His research proved that while the so-called 'Protestant pot' seemed plausible, a 'Catholic-pot' seemed unlikely:

"As the Irish were residentially mixed with the British, Scandinavians and Germans, and separated from the Poles and Italians, this suggested an ‘old European’ rather than a ‘Protestant’ melting pot. There was, in fact, a white melting pot which began with the ‘old’ Europeans and into which Poles, Italians and, to an extent, Jewish populations were added as time went on."

His research in the 1970s and 1980s focused on housing tenure and segregation in the United Kingdom and the United States and during this time he worked closely with Dr Samir Shah and later with Dr Margaret Byron.

In the 1990s and 2000s Peach continued his research on issues of segregation with particular focus on the dynamics relating to, and the arguments surrounding, Ghetto formation and White flight. This included differences between British and American cities and whether British cities had become more segregated than Chicago. He also examined the growth of the Muslim population in Europe, and particularly in Britain, and this has developed into a large scale study of the cultural geography of Muslim mosques, Sikh Gurdwaras and Hindu Mandirs on the landscape of Britain.

His Economic and Social Research Council funded project on ethno-religio-linguistic sub-communities links his database on Muslim, Hindu and Sikh places of worship in the United Kingdom, completed as a millennium project, and funded by the Leverhulme Trust, with the United Kingdom Census 2001 data on ethnicity and religion. The Leverhulme survey photographed and collected data on religion, tradition, movements, vernacular language, date of foundation and other variables on nearly 1,000 buildings. Peach was a member of the Advisory Board of the Oxford Centre for Islamic Studies and the Oxford Centre for Hindu Studies.

== Retirement ==
On 22 September 2007 Ceri Peach retired from St Catherine’s College and became an emeritus fellow at the College. a series of talks were given by former pupils and colleagues at the Oxford University Centre for the Environment on 22 September followed by a reception and speeches by professors Ron J. Johnston and Gary Bridge. St Catherine's has created the Ceri Peach Trust Fund to honour the 40 years' contribution Peach has made to the study of geography, and to ensure that geography continues to flourish at the college.

Recalling his time at the college Peach remarked:

"My career has been an exciting and a full one. I am grateful for the opportunities it has offered me to teach – and be taught by – my students, and also for the fellowship of my colleagues."

== Subsequent career ==
In 2008, the BBC reported that, along with Ludi Simpson and Danny Dorling, Peach was considered to be one of the top three British thinkers in the field of racial segregation. In the same year, he was nominated as "Ethnic Geography Distinguished Scholar of 2008" by the Association of American Geographers at their April meeting in Boston.

In 2016, Peach was awarded a Doctorate of Letters by the University of Oxford, which is one of the highest academic honours that the University may confer. It was given in recognition of the contribution he has made to academia throughout his career, particularly to his main field of research in human migration and the racial segregation of minority groups, ethnic groups and religious groups in the United Kingdom, United States and Western Europe.

== Publications ==
Selected publications include:

- Urban Social Segregation (1975)(ISBN 0582480892)
- The Caribbean in Europe, contrasting patterns of migration and settlement in Britain, France and the Netherlands (1991) (ISBN 094830362X)
- West Indian Migrations to Britain: A Social Geography. (1968) (ASIN B0017D0DSI)

Selected co-authored, or co-edited, publications include:

- Ethnic Segregation in Cities (with Vaughan Robinson, and Susan Smith) (1981) (ISBN 0709920121)
- South Asians Overseas: Migration and Ethnicity (with Clarke, C., and S. Vertovec) (1990) (ISBN 0521129656)
- Geography and Ethnic Pluralism. (with Clarke, C., and S. Vertovec) (1990)
- Islam in Europe: The Politics of Religion and Community (Migration, Minorities & Citizenship) (edited with Steven Vertovec) (1997)(ISBN 0333687035)
- Global Japan: The Experience of Japan's New Immigrant and Overseas Communities (edited with Roger Goodman, Ayumi Takenaka, and Paul White)(2003) (ISBN 0415297419)

== Interest in rowing ==
Outside his research interests, Peach has maintained a keen interest in rowing:

"Catz has had a strong stream of oarsmen – many of whom I have had the privilege to teach. Sir Matthew Pinsent (1989, Geography) remains a golden star – he never missed a tutorial, never failed to produce an essay, took a good degree and demonstrated that athletes at a high level are more conscious of time planning, and more efficient at meeting commitments, than many others with far less pressure on them."

St Catherine's College Oxford Rowing Blade

Other notable rowers, who comprise part of the strong Olympic Games rowing tradition at St Catherine's, include Colin Smith (2003, Geography), Andrew Triggs Hodge (2004, Geography and the Environment) and Stephan Mølvig (2005, Geography and the Environment).

== Other work ==
He was on the governing body of Abingdon School from 1982-1987.
