= Katherine Ross (scientist) =

British marine biologist and conservationist

Katherine “Frin” Ross is a British marine biologist and conservationist who has worked extensively in the Falkland Islands and South Georgia and the South Sandwich Islands. She previously served as Marine and Fisheries Officer for the Government of South Georgia and the South Sandwich Islands.

== Career ==
As part of her doctoral research, Ross studied benthos and scallop aquaculture at the University of Liverpool's Port Erin Marine Laboratory on the Isle of Man. She subsequently worked on marine protected area policy for the Joint Nature Conservation Committee in Aberdeen, Scotland, and worked on salmon, sea trout, and shellfish stock assessment and habitat restoration in Scotland's Outer Hebrides, completing an important survey of cockle grounds in 2009 and 2010.

Ross then served as Chief Scientist of the British Antarctic Survey's King Edward Point Research Station in South Georgia and the South Sandwich Islands. She also worked at a freshwater fishery in the Falkland Islands, and her research has included work on conservation of native fish in the Falklands.

Ross was appointed as South Georgia and the South Sandwich Islands' Marine and Fisheries Officer in 2012. She held the post until 2015, when she left to become the Habitats Officer at Falklands Conservation.

Her current work focuses on collaborating with the local Falklands community to restore eroded areas with native plants.

== Selected works ==
- Kevin A. Hughes, Oliver L. Pescott, Jodey Peyton, Tim Adriaens, Elizabeth J. Cottier‐Cook, Gillian Key, Wolfgang Rabitsch, Elena Tricarico, David K. A. Barnes, Naomi Baxter, Mark Belchier, Denise Blake, Peter Convey, Wayne Dawson, Danielle Frohlich, Lauren M. Gardiner, Pablo González‐Moreno, Ross James, Christopher Malumphy, Stephanie Martin, Angeliki F. Martinou, Dan Minchin, Andrea Monaco, Niall Moore, Simon A. Morley, Katherine Ross, Jonathan Shanklin, Katharine Turvey, David Vaughan, Alexander G. C. Vaux, Victoria Werenkraut, Ian J. Winfield, Helen E. Roy. "Invasive non‐native species likely to threaten biodiversity and ecosystems in the Antarctic Peninsula region." Global Change Biology, 2020; DOI: 10.1111/gcb.14938
- Smith, Stuart & Ross, Katherine & Karlsson, Susanna & Bond, Brian & Upson, Rebecca & Davey, Alexandra. (2017). "Going native, going local: Revegetating eroded soils on the Falkland Islands using native seeds and farmland waste." Restoration Ecology. 10.1111/rec.12552.
- Ross AK and Mackenzie LS, (2010) Survey of the cockle grounds of the Western Isles 2009-2010.
- Katherine Ross. Freshwater Fish in the Falklands: Conservation of Native Zebra Trout, report to the Falkland Islands Government and Falklands Conservation (2009)
- Ross, Katherine & Thorpe, John & Brand, Andrew. (2004). "Biological control of fouling in suspended scallop cultivation." Aquaculture. 229. 99–116. 10.1016/S0044-8486(03)00328-4.
- Ross, K.A. & Thorpe, J.P. & Norton, T.A. & Brand, Andrew. (2002). "Fouling in scallop cultivation: Help or hindrance?" Journal of Shellfish Research. 21. 539–547.
- Ross, Katherine & Thorpe, John & Norton, Trevor & Brand, Andrew. (2001). "An assessment of some methods for tagging the great scallop, Pecten maximus." Journal of the Marine Biological Association of the United Kingdom. 81. 975–977. 10.1017/S0025315401004921.
