= A. Catharine Ross =

Professor of nutritional sciences

Dr. A. Catharine Ross is the Dorothy Foehr Huck Chair and a Professor of Nutrition and Physiology at Penn State University. She studies areas of nutritional science related to the vitamin A molecule.

== Early life ==
Ross attended the University of California, Davis and majored in zoology, graduating in 1970. She enrolled for one semester at the University of California, Berkeley, where she took an introductory course in nutrition from Doris Calloway which inspired her later career as a nutritionologist. She married Alex Ross, a photographer, in 1969.

After graduating from the University of California, Davis, Ross enrolled at Cornell, where she completed her master's degree in nutritional science and PhD from the department of biochemistry.

== Research ==
Ross studies the biosynthesis of vitamin A molecules, and how vitamin A factors into the immune response. For her research, Ross has been elected as a member of the National Academy of Sciences. Since 2004, she has been an editor of the Journal of Nutrition and served two terms as a member of the Board of Food and Nutrition at the National Academy Institute of Medicine from 1997 to 2004.

In 2013, Ross published the 11th edition of the textbook Modern Nutrition in Health and Disease. Ross became a professor at Penn State University in 1997 and head of the nutritional sciences department in 2017.

Ross has authored or coauthored 290 publications and has an h-index of 26.
