= Blue Mountain Theatre =

Theatre company in London, England

Blue Mountain Theatre is a theatre company created in London in 1989 to provide theatre pieces for black British audiences.

Influenced by the thriving theatrical community in Jamaica, the group attempted to perform pieces that would serves as a social event rather than what they viewed as traditional elitist audiences. Titles have included Betrayed, Affairs, Smallie, Forbidden Love, Confessions of a Black Woman and more recently Wicked Bitches and Dutty Wine.
