= Cathy Ross =

Cathy Ross may refer to:

- Cathy Ross (missiologist) (born 1961), New Zealand-born missiologist
- Cathy Ross (soccer) (born 1967), Canadian soccer player
