= Robert Priseman =

British painter (born 1965)

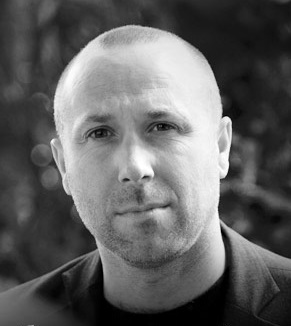
- Education: University of Essex
- Occupations: British artist, collector, writer and curator
- Known for: Contemporary British Painting The Priseman-Seabrook Collection of 21st Century British Painting
- Notable work: 'No Human Way To Kill' 'Nazi Gas Chambers: From Memory To History'
- Website: Robert Priseman

Robert Priseman (born in Spondon, Derbyshire in 1965) is a British artist, collector, writer, curator and publisher who lives and works in Essex, England. Over 200 works of art by Priseman are held in art museum collections around the world including the V&A, Museum der Moderne Salzburg, Art Gallery of New South Wales, Musée de Louvain la Neuve, The Royal Collection at Windsor Castle, The Allen Memorial Art Museum, The Mead Art Museum, Honolulu Museum of Art and The National Galleries of Scotland.

Priseman read aesthetics and art theory at the University of Essex under art theorist Professor Michael Podro and began his working life as a book designer for Longman publishers (1989–1992). While there he started painting portraits in oils, with sitters including the Dalai Lama, Phil Collins, Jeremy Paxman and Cardinal Basil Hume. Work from this period is held in number of public collections including The Royal Collection at Windsor Castle, Corpus Christi College Cambridge and Cranfield University. In 2004 he gave up portrait painting and embarked on thematic series of works aimed to engage the viewer in dialogue on provocative psychological and socio-political issues. Such works include The Hospital Paintings, Subterraneans, The Francis Bacon Interiors, No Human Way to Kill, The Troubles and Nazi Gas Chambers.

In 2013 Priseman, in partnership with artist, Simon Carter established Contemporary British Painting. In 2013 he donated a collection of twenty paintings by contemporary British artists, known as 'The Robert Priseman Gift', to the Falmouth Art Gallery, England. Robert Priseman and Simon Carter established 'East Contemporary Art: A collection of 21st Century Practice' at University Campus Suffolk, England. Priseman also collects paintings by British artists he admires and owns the ‘Priseman Seabrook Collection of 21st Century British Painting’ which first went on museum display at Huddersfield Art Gallery in 2014. In 2010 he was appointed Fellow at the Human Rights Centre, University of Essex in 2015 visiting professor in fine art at the Department of Art and Humanities, University Campus Suffolk, and in 2017 a visiting research fellow at the University of Leeds

== Contemporary British Painting ==
In 2013 Priseman founded Contemporary British Painting in partnership with artist Simon Carter - a platform for contemporary painting in the UK. Formed to explore and promote critical context and dialogue in current painting practice through solo and group exhibitions; talks, publications and an art prize, Contemporary British Painting also facilitates the donation of paintings to art collections, galleries and museums in the UK and around the world.

== Priseman Seabrook Collection of 21st Century British Painting ==
In 2012 Robert Priseman assembled a private collection of work by contemporary British painters which formed the foundation of The Priseman Seabrook Collection of 21st Century British Painting. As well as emerging artists, the collection contains works by artists of national significance including: Tracey Emin, Matthew Krishanu, Mary Webb, Peter Blake, Susan Gunn, Graham Sutherland, Nicholas Middleton, Lucian Freud, Francis Bacon, Simon Burton, Alex Hanna, Alan Davie, Pen Dalton, Susie Hamilton, Julie Umerle, Simon Carter, Judith Tucker, Marguerite Horner, Claudia Böse, Stephen Newton, Alison Pilkington, James Quin, Nathan Eastwood, Paula MacArthur, Greg Rook, Annabel Dover and David Hockney. The collection, owned by Priseman and his wife, was exhibited for the first time in 2014 at Huddersfield Art Gallery and now includes over 100 works of art.

== Selected art work by Robert Priseman ==
=== The Francis Bacon Interiors ===
'The Francis Bacon Interiors' were painted between 2006–2008 and depict the Paris hotel room where Francis Bacon's lover and muse George Dyer committed suicide, the room in a Catholic hospital in Madrid where Bacon himself died, and a series of studios where he painted. 'The Francis Bacon Interiors' formed part of 'The Subconscious Revealed', an exhibition curated by Priseman at Huddersfield Art Gallery in 2009. Other work in the exhibition included Bacon’s ‘Figure Study Two’ and works by Freud, Auerbach, Sutherland, Kossof and Richard Hamilton.

=== No Human Way to Kill ===
Electric Chair by Robert Priseman from the 'No Human Way To Kill' series

In 2007 Priseman began work on the No Human Way to Kill series of paintings which present the five different methods of execution used in the USA (Hanging, Firing Squad, Gassing, Lethal Injection and Electrocution), alongside the paintings, twelve etchings look at other methods of state sanctioned execution used around the world. The series examined how different countries have adopted different techniques to execute condemned prisoners, which in turn argue execution to be a socially constructed act of group catharsis. No Human Way to Kill was exhibited at The Dazed Gallery in London in 2008 and at The White Box in New York in 2010 and 2011. The original paintings and drawings are held at the Mead Art Museum at Amherst College, Massachusetts, USA with a set of twelve etchings at the V&A, London.

=== Nazi Gas Chambers: From Memory To History ===
Following on from 'No Human Way to Kill' Priseman produced the 'Gas Chambers' series which were first exhibited at The Minories Galleries, Colchester, UK. The project has three parts and focuses on the developmental steps taken in Nazi Germany that began with the gassing of the mentally ill and ended in genocide. The first part comprises portraits of the participants of the Wannsee Conference of 20 January 1942, the second part comprises six pencil drawings which are designed to look like hand coloured postcards and show the outsides of the hospitals in Germany and Austria where the T4 Euthanasia programme took place between 1939 and 1941. The third part consists of five large oil paintings (each 6 ft x 9 ft) which trace the movement taken by the Nazis towards an industrialised killing process which culminated in Auschwitz. The project was also exhibited at CoCA, Christchurch, New Zealand in 2010 and Arch 402 Gallery, London in 2012. The Wannsee portraits are held by the Tweed Museum of Art, Duluth, Minnesota, USA and the remainder of the collection at the Museum der Moderne, Salzburg, Austria.

=== Omagh ===
In 2010 Priseman completed two paintings on the Omagh bombing in Northern Ireland. 'Omagh 15.00' is based on a photograph of Market Street taken shortly before the explosion and 'Omagh Bombing 15.10' is based on a still from a video looking the opposite direction along Market Street towards the Omagh Courthouse and depicts the scene just after the explosion. The paintings are held at Wolverhampton Art Gallery, England.

=== Fame ===
Priseman purchased one hundred damaged religious icons from eBay and over-painted each with a 20th-century celebrity who died prematurely from suicide or as a result of a self-destructive lifestyle. The over-painting seeks to mimic the replacement in contemporary culture of faith with fame and of saints with ‘stars’, exploring Jarvis Cocker’s idea that people believe fame is a kind of heaven that can “sort things out”. Priseman explores the territory of the cult of the celebrity, focusing on those amongst the celebrated who are troubled and at times unable to cope with the pressures of modern living. Fame exhibited at Art Exchange, Colchester, England in 2013, WhiteBox Art Center, New York in 2014 and St Marylebone Crypt, London in 2015. Over seventy of the originals are held in the permanent collection of The University of Arizona Museum of Art. The balance of the project is held in the collections of Honolulu Museum of Art, MOMA Wales, Mabee-Gerrer Museum of Art, Wayne State University Art Collection, Michigan, UMMA, Michigan, The Dennos Museum Center, Michigan and The Allen Memorial Art Museum, Michigan.

== Selected solo exhibitions ==
2018- The Longue Duree, Yantai Art Gallery, Yantai, Tai’an Art Museum, Tai’an, Weihai Art Museum, Weihai City and Yantai Suochengli Library, Shandong Province, China.

2017- Fame, The University of Arizona, Museum of Art, USA

2016 - Never Knowing Why, Waterfront Gallery, University of Suffolk, Ipswich, UK

2015 - Outlaws, SE9 Container Gallery, London

2014 - Fame, The Crypt, St. Marylebone Parish Church, London

2014 - Fame, Whitebox Art Center, New York

2013 - Fame, Art Exchange, Colchester, England

2012 - Nazi Gas Chambers: From Memory to History, Arch 402, London

2011 - No Human Way to Kill, Part II, Whitebox Art Center, New York

2010 - Gas Chambers, CoCA, New Zealand

2010 - No Human Way to Kill, WhiteBox Art Center, New York

2009 - Gas Chambers, The Minories Galleries, Colchester, England

2009 - American Execution, The University of Essex, Colchester, England

2009 - No Human Way to Kill, European Commission 12 Star Gallery, London

2009 - The Francis Bacon Interiors, Huddersfield Art Gallery, England

2008 - American Execution, Dazed Gallery, London

== Selected publications ==
Priseman, R, (2017) Contemporary Masters From Britain, Colchester, Seabrook Press, ISBN 978-1543281620

Priseman, R, (2015) Priseman Seabrook collection of 21st Century British Painting Catalogue 2015. Colchester: Seabrook Press. ISBN 978-1505537239.

Priseman, R, & Boland, M, (2015) Fame. Colchester, Seabrook Press. ISBN 978-1505888416.

Priseman, R., Bowman, M. & Pryor, J-P. (2015) Sumac: An Art Project by Robert Priseman. Colchester: Seabrook Press. ISBN 978-1505987300.

Priseman, R., Vergo, P. & Schulze, R. (2015) Nazi Gas Chambers: From Memory to History. Colchester: Seabrook Press. ISBN 978-1507747063.

Priseman, R., Cummings, S. & O'Kane, P. (2015) Documentary Realism: Painting In A Digital Age. Colchester: Seabrook Press. ISBN 978-1507664261.

Priseman, R., Channer, O. & Livingstone, T. (2014) Outlaws: An Art Project by Robert Priseman. Colchester: Seabrook Press. ISBN 978-1505492224.

Priseman, R., Iverson, M. & Cranfield, B. (2015) Hospital: An Art Project by Robert Priseman. Colchester: Seabrook Press. ISBN 978-1506196749.

Priseman, R. (2013) Painting the Holocaust: Can there be Art after Auschwitz? in R. Schulze (ed.) The Arts and the Holocaust. The Holocaust in History and Memory Vol. 6. Colchester: University of Essex.

Priseman, R., Rodley, N., Willett, J., Harrington, C. & Ross, A. (2009) No Human Way To Kill. Colchester: Seabrook Press and University of Essex. ISBN 978-0956208248.

Peppiatt, M. & Priseman, R. (2011) The Francis Bacon Interiors. Colchester, Seabrook Press. ISBN 978-0956208224.
