= Lucy Cox (artist) =

British artist & curator (born 1988)

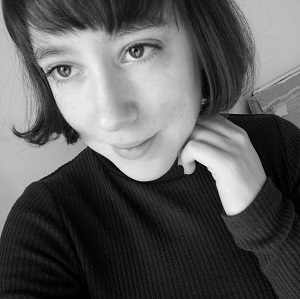
- Lucy Cox, artist
- Education: MA Culture, Policy & Management; City, University of London; BA Hons Fine Art; Wimbledon College of Arts; University of the Arts London; FdA Art & Design; Kingston College &; Kingston University London
- Occupations: Artist, Curator
- Website: lucycox.com

Lucy Cox (born 1988) in Chard, Somerset, UK, is a British abstract artist and curator.

== Education ==
Cox received a Master of Arts (MA) in Culture, Policy and Management from City, University of London, a Bachelor of Arts with Honours (BA Hons) in Fine Art from Wimbledon College of Arts, University of the Arts London and a Foundation Degree (FdA) in Art & Design from Kingston University London in collaboration with School of Art & Design, Kingston College.

== Practice ==
Cox has exhibited her paintings in the UK and internationally, including an exhibition of British painters in China, and has curated exhibitions in London. Andy Parkinson wrote of her work, "Lucy Cox's playful geometric arrangements, almost inhabiting a believable three dimensional space, seem to celebrate the ways in which colour creates spatial ambiguities and irregularities". Sharples described Cox's paintings as compositions which "reveal vivid organic and geometric shapes, gradations of colour, exchanges and explorations of the figure/ground relationship between translucency and opaqueness", while Robert Priseman describes her abstract paintings as "juxtaposing the autonomy of geometry with repetition and spontaneity". She is a member of Contemporary British Painting and on the advisory board of The Priseman Seabrook Collections.

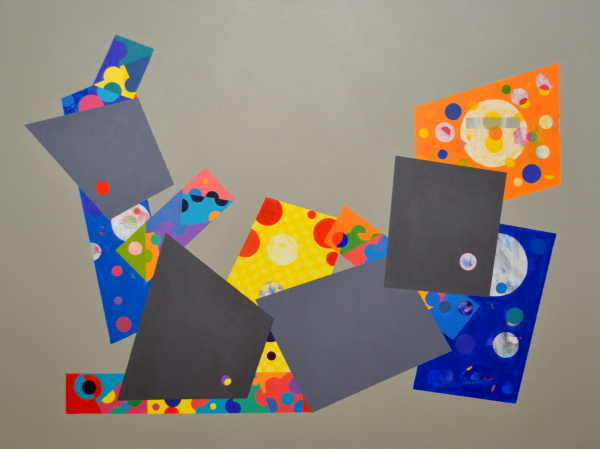
Zippy by Lucy Cox

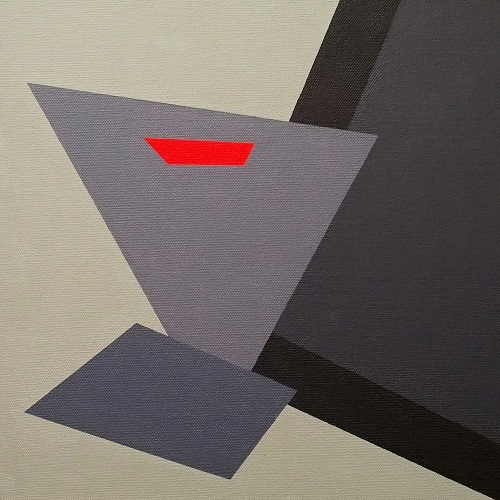
The Chair by Lucy Cox

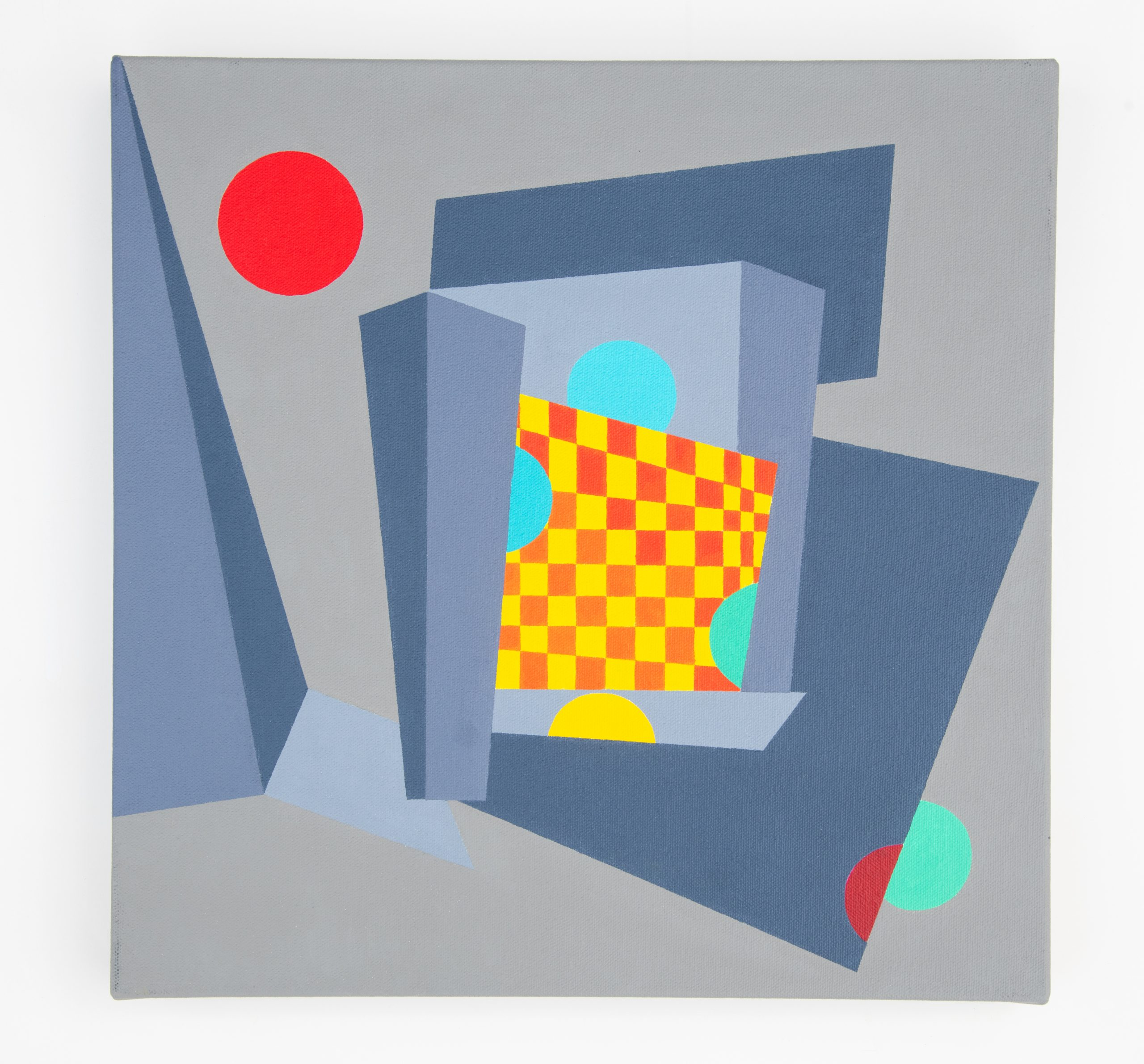
Abstract 23-1

== Selected exhibitions ==
- 2025 - Ilminster Open, Ilminster Arts, Ilminster, UK
- 2024 - Assembly, Rye Creative Centre, Rye, UK
- 2024 - Paintings for Lucas House, Barnet, Enfield & Haringey Mental Health NHS Trust, UK
- 2023 - X - Contemporary British Painting, Newcastle Contemporary Art, UK
- 2022 - Vitalistic Fantasies, Elysium Gallery, Swansea, UK
- 2021 - Edge to Edge, The Cello Factory, London
- 2021 - Being There, Prosaic Projects Gallery, Bloc Studios, Sheffield, UK
- 2020 - Vitalistic Fantasies, The Cello Factory Gallery, London
- 2020 - Dear Christine (a Tribute to Christine Keeler), Arthouse 1, London
- 2019 - Dear Christine (a Tribute to Christine Keeler), Elysium Gallery, Swansea, UK
- 2019 - Made in Britain; 82 Painters of the 21st Century, Muzeum Narodowe w Gdansk, Poland
- 2019 - Dear Christine (a Tribute to Christine Keeler), Vane, Newcastle-Upon-Tyne, UK
- 2018 - New Painting, The Crypt, Marylebone, London
- 2018 - SFSA Painting Open, Second Floor Studios & Arts, London
- 2017/18 - Contemporary Masters from Britain, Tianjin Academy of Fine Arts Museum, China
- 2017/18 - Testcard P, The Crypt, Marylebone, London
- 2017 - Contemporary Masters from Britain, Jiangsu Provincial Art Museum, Nanjing, China
- 2017 - Contemporary Masters from Britain, Jiangsu Museum of Arts and Crafts (Artall), Nanjing, China
- 2017 - Anything Goes? Art Bermondsey Project Space, London
- 2017 - Contemporary Masters from Britain, Yantai Art Museum, China
- 2017 - Colour A Kind Of Bliss, The Crypt, Marylebone, London
- 2016 - Summer Exhibition, The Quay Arts, Isle of Wight, UK
- 2015/16 - Piercing The Veil, Simmons Contemporary, Simmons & Simmons, London
- 2015 - Geometry: Wonky and Otherwise, Déda, Derby, UK

== Selected curation ==
- 2020 - I'm in a Window Mood, The Aura of Abstraction on-line
- 2017 - Colour A Kind Of Bliss, The Crypt, Marylebone, London
- 2016 - Multiple Choices, Simmons Contemporary, Simmons & Simmons, London

== Collections ==
Barnet, Enfield & Haringey Mental Health NHS Trust, UK

The Priseman Seabrook Collection, UK

Jiangsu Provincial Art Museum, Nanjing, China

== Publications & Media ==
- 2026 - Artist to Artist: Interviews on Art With Contemporary British Painters, Seabrook Press
- 2024 - Robert Priseman Interviews Lucy Cox, Priseman Seabrook Collections
- 2023 - Interview With Andrew Litten and Lucy Cox, in Andrew Litten: The Human Shadow (The Animal Smile), Anima Mundi
- 2023 - Artist to Artist: Lucy Cox Interviews Keith Murdoch, Priseman Seabrook Collections
- 2023 - Andrew Litten: Artist of the Month, Contemporary British Painting
- 2021 - Darkness at Noon: Online Panel Discussion, Contemporary British Painting
- 2021 - Catching Mice: Peter Clossick interviewed by Lucy Cox, The Jackdaw, May/June 2021
- 2020 - The Exploration of Suffering and the Celebration of Beauty: An Interview with Robert Priseman, Lucy Cox
- 2019 - Dear Christine; A Tribute To Christine Keeler, Fionn Wilson (Ed.)
- 2018-2020 - Painters Today, Podcast Series, Lucy Cox
- 2018 - Made in Britain; 82 Painters of the 21st Century, Robert Priseman
- 2017 - Contemporary Masters From Britain: 80 British Painters of the 21st Century, Robert Priseman
- 2017 - Colour A Kind Of Bliss, Lucy Cox & Freya Purdue
- 2016 - Multiple Choices, Michael O'Donoghue & Lucy Cox, Simmons & Simmons
- 2015 - Piercing the Veil, Jon Sharples, Simmons & Simmons
