= Terry Greene =

British painter

- Education: Leeds Metropolitan University, Bradford College
- Occupation: Artist
- Website: Terry Greene

Terry Greene is an artist living and working in West Yorkshire. He received a Bachelor of Arts (BA) in Art & Design from Bradford College and a Master of Arts (MA) in Theory of Practice from Leeds Metropolitan University (now Leeds Beckett University). Greene is a member of Contemporary British Painting.

Greene's work is described as an exploration in the duality of paint as structure and agency

== Selected exhibitions ==
2017/18 - Contemporary Masters from Britain: 80 British Painters of the 21st Century, Tianjin Academy of Fine Arts Museum, China, Jiangsu Art Gallery, Nanjing, China, Jiangsu Museum of Arts and Crafts (Artall), Nanjing, China, Yantai Art Museum, China

2017 - Anything Goes? Art Bermondsey Project Space, London

2017 - 30 x 30 x 34, The Crypt, Marylebone, London

2017 - A5xn, dalla Rosa Gallery, London

2016 - Paper Cuts, Transition Gallery, London

2016 - Art on a Postcard Secret Auction, Maddox Gallery, London

2016 - Summer Exhibition, The Quay Arts, Isle of Wight, UK

2016 - Precious Little, Harrington Mill Studios, Nottingham, UK

2016 - Selected Work from The Priseman Seabrook Collection, Minories Art Galleries, Colchester, UK

2016 - Window, Artists Workhouse, Studley, UK

2015 - Geometry: Wonky and Otherwise, Déda, Derby, UK

2015 - Carta, dalla Rosa Gallery, London

2015 - Cross Section/03, dalla Rosa Gallery, London

2015 - Writhe and Jerk, Transition Gallery, London

2014 - Launch Pad: About Painting, Castlefield Gallery, Manchester, UK

2014 - Infinity: One, dalla Rosa Gallery, London

== Collections ==
The Priseman Seabrook Collection, UK
