= Mandy Payne =

British painter (born 1964)

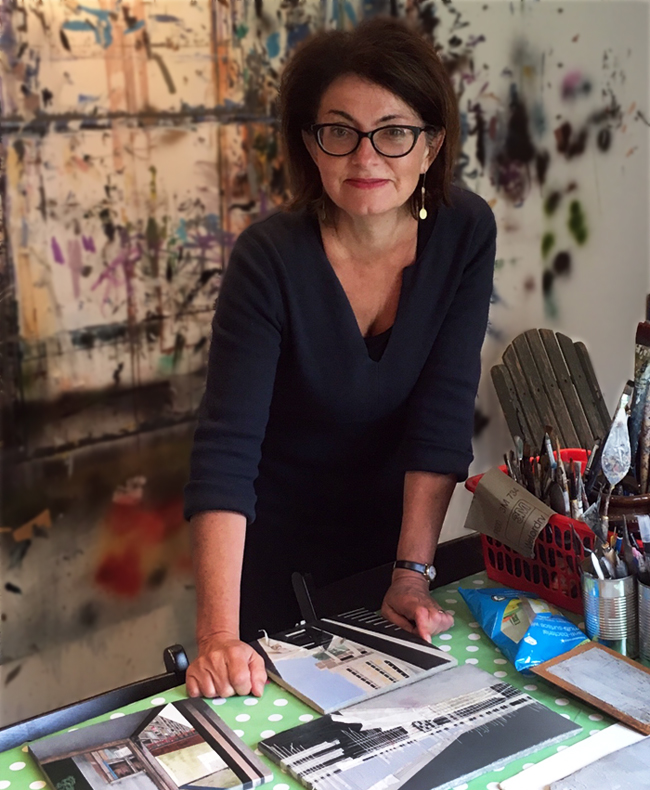
- Payne in her studio
- Born: 1964 (age 61–62); Pontypool, Wales
- Occupation: Artist
- Website: www.mandypayneart.co.uk

Mandy Payne (born 1964) is a member of the Contemporary British Painting group and is an artist with a primary interest in portraying the regeneration of inner-city environments and the transitory nature of urban communities. Her themes include the contrasts between twentieth-century inner-city social housing and modern gentrification.

== Work ==
Works from Payne's series studying the housing estate of Park Hill, Sheffield (UK) – showing its dilapidated state and Brutalist architecture before renovation – feature in private and public collections including that of the University of Salford, the Ruskin Collection (Sheffield Museums), The Priseman Seabrook Collection, and the Newlight Art Prize collection. She has won multiple awards and has received commissions including selection in 2017 for StudioBook - the artist professional development programme with Mark Devereaux Projects (MDP), Manchester – and was awarded Commission to Collect by MDP and the University of Salford Art Collection, to create a new painting considering the impacts of the Grenfell Tower incident upon Salford's housing developments. Recognition for her work includes selection for the John Moores Painting Prize (2014, 2016 and 2020), the Royal Academy Summer Exhibition (2023, 2022 and also each year from 2014 to 2019), the Threadneedle Prize (2013) and the Lynn Painter-Stainers Prize (2019).

In 2017, she was noted as an artist to watch in the Observer/Guardian Rising Stars list.

Payne often paints directly with aerosols on to concrete. Her compositions – bold arrangements of blank-faced geometric walls, empty windows and deserted walkways – similarly pull no pictorial punches.

— Robert Clarke, The Guardian

Her images of Sheffield's Park Hill flats have the power and presence that most artists fail to achieve in a lifetime.

— Alexei Sayle, The BBC

As a painter and print-maker, Payne works on a range of surfaces including paper, concrete, etched aluminium and discarded marble work surfaces or floorboards salvaged from the derelict or decommissioned sites she is depicting. She creates stone Lithographs of her drawings and her painting materials include various combinations of aerosol paint, roofing sealant, acrylic and lithographic crayon directly onto board or her purpose made concrete slabs.

== Life ==
Prior to 2012, she had a 25-year career as a dentist in the NHS Community and Hospital Dental Services. In 2013 she gained a BA (Hons) Fine Art (First-Class) degree at the University of Nottingham and in 2015 she was awarded a two-year Fellowship to study stone lithography at Leicester Print Workshop under the tutelage of Serena Smith.

== Exhibitions ==
Payne has held solo exhibitions of her work and has been included in group exhibitions at several galleries and exhibition venues both nationally and internationally, including the Herrick Gallery (Piccadilly, London), Huddersfield Art Gallery, Bowes Museum (Barnard Castle), Jiangsu Art Gallery (Nanjing, China), Menier Gallery (Southwark Street, London), Walker Art Gallery (Liverpool), Bankside Gallery (Thames Riverside, London), National Museum of Poland (National Museum, Gdańsk, Poland) and Panter and Hall (Pall Mall, London).

== Collections ==
- University of Salford Art Collection. Salford, UK
- Elizabeth Greenshield Foundation Collection. Montreal, Canada
- Ruskin Collection, Millennium Gallery. Sheffield Museums, UK
- The Priseman Seabrook Collection. Essex, UK
- New Light Art Collection. UK
- Yale Center for British Art. Connecticut, USA
- University of Nottingham Ningbo China.
- Devonshire Collection. Chatsworth House, Derbyshire, UK
- University of Sheffield. Sheffield, UK
