= Iain Andrews =

English painter

- Education: Aberystwyth University; University of Sheffield
- Occupations: Artist and painter

Iain Andrews (born 1974) is a contemporary English painter. He lives and works in Manchester, England. He received a Bachelor of Arts with Honours (BA Hons) in Fine Art and a Master of Arts (MA) in Painting from University College of Wales, Aberystwyth (now Aberystwyth University) and was awarded a Post-graduate Diploma (PGDip) in Art Psychotherapy from University of Sheffield.

Andrews’ work mixes the colour palette of contemporary abstract painting with the cracked paint and varnish associated with Renaissance masters and nostalgic Victorian painting, from which he also appropriates various compositional and figurative elements. He is a member of Contemporary British Painting and has exhibited nationally and internationally. In 2009 Andrews was one of twelve artists chosen to appear in the BBC Television series "School of Saatchi", he won the Marmite Prize for Painting III (2010–2011) with his work "The East Me" (500mm x 600mm acrylic on canvas). He was a judge for the Marmite Prize for Painting IV (2012–13) and was runner-up in the Greater Manchester Chamber of Commerce GM Art Prize 2016.

== Selected collections ==
- The Priseman Seabrook Collection of 21st Century British Painting

== Selected solo exhibitions ==
2015 - Changeling, York College Gallery, York, England

2014 - Re:view, solo exhibition, Castlefield Gallery, Manchester, England

2013 - Il teatro dei leviatano, Man and Eve, London

2013 - The Language of Paint (with Richard Kenton Webb), Atkinson Gallery, Somerset, England

2012 - Mythopoeia, Warrington Museum and Art Gallery, Warrington, England

2011 - Man & Eve at the Manchester Contemporary Art Fair, England

2009 - The Pilgrimage of Lost Children and Other Stories, Bankley Mill, Manchester, England

== Selected group exhibitions ==
2016 - Correspond, Artworks, Halifax and touring London, Liverpool and Rye, England

2016 - Sixty, Lubomirov / Angus- Hughes, London

2016 - Finalist in the judged exhibition Anthology, Van der Plas Gallery, New York

2015 - Detail, The Usher Gallery, Lincoln, England

2014 - Detail, H Project Space, Bangkok, Thailand & Transition Gallery London

2013 - Beautiful Things, The Next Door Projects, Albert Dock, Liverpool, England

2012 - The Creatures of Prometheus, International Beethoven Festival, Chicago, USA

2011 - Polemically Small, Garboushian Gallery, Los Angeles, USA

2011 - We Are All In This Together, Bureau Gallery, Manchester, UK

2010/11 The Marmite Prize III, Tameside Gallery, London, UK

2010 - The Borrowed Loop, Man & Eve, London, UK

2010 - The Crash Salon, Charlie Dutton Gallery, London, UK

2009 - Salon 09, Matt Roberts Arts, London, UK

2009 - British Art in the Twenty First Century, Opera Gallery, Hungary
