= David Manley (artist) =

British painter

- Education: Falmouth College of Art & Design, Birmingham Polytechnic, De Montfort University
- Occupations: Artist, educationalist, art administrator
- Website: David Manley Official

David Manley, artist, educationalist and arts administrator was born in Devon and lives and works in North West Leicestershire, UK. He received a Diploma in Art & Design, Fine Art from Falmouth School of Art (now Falmouth University) in 1972 and a Higher Diploma in Art & Design, Fine Art from Birmingham School of Art, Birmingham Polytechnic (now Birmingham City University) in 1974. He also has a Master of Arts (MA) in Photography from De Montfort University, Leicester, UK. In 1975 Manley was awarded a painting fellowship at Gloucestershire College of Art and Design. There followed a career in arts administration including Visual Arts Director and Head of Public Affairs at East Midlands Arts, UK. In 1994 he was appointed Assistant Dean of the School of Art and Design at the University of Derby and became Dean of the school in 1995. In 2003 he was appointed Dean of the new Faculty of Arts, Design and Technology at the University of Derby and in 2007 Director of Cultural Development.

Manley is an artist working across a variety of media including installation; painting; digital manipulation and photography. His concerns include place, time and memory and he is especially interested in the cumulative impact of serial imagery.

== Selected solo exhibitions ==
2016 - All Of My Senses At Once, Harrington Mill Studios, Nottingham, UK

2015 - Winter Cycle, New Court Gallery, Repton, Derbyshire, UK

2013 - Epidemic / Black North, Angear Gallery, Lakeside Arts, Nottingham

2013 - Deadly Delicious, Tarpey Gallery, Castle Donington

2011 - From The Earth Wealth, Tarpey Gallery, Castle Donington, UK

== Selected group exhibitions ==
2017/18 - Contemporary Masters from Britain: 80 British Painters of the 21st Century, Tianjin Academy of Fine Arts Museum, China, Jiangsu Art Gallery, Nanjing, China, Jiangsu Museum of Arts and Crafts (Artall), Nanjing, China, Yantai Art Museum, China

2017 - Colour a Kind of Bliss, The Crypt, Marylebone, London

2016 - Salon 9, The Old Lock Up Studio, Cromford, Derbyshire, UK

2015 - Geometry, Wonky and Otherwise, Déda Derby, UK

2014 - Carnival Of Monsters, Nottingham, UK

2014 - Launch Pad: About Painting, Castlefield Gallery, Manchester, UK

== Selected publications ==
2017 - Selected Poems by Trevor James and David Manley

2015 - A Winter Cycle, A Winter's Journey by David Manley (paintings) and Reg Keeling (poems)

2015 - Geometry Wonky & Otherwise

== Collections ==
The Priseman Seabrook Collection, UK
