= Helen Gorrill =

Helen Gorrill, Helen Gørrill, is a British artist, curator, feminist and art historian. She was awarded a doctorate in contemporary British Painting in 2017, co-supervised by the Royal College of Art. Her PhD thesis "The Gendered Economic and Symbolic Values in Contemporary British Painting" was subsequently acquired by the publishers I.B. Tauris/Bloomsbury.

== Biography ==
Gorrill's artwork is included in private and public collections around the world, including in the New York Brooklyn Museum's Elizabeth A. Sackler Center for Feminist Art's digital archive. Helen Gørrill's artwork explores ideas about time, history and reality; using contemporary imagery that juxtaposes with the Old Masters she sets out to reappropriate. Her new artwork focuses on vandalising old masters and reviving art historical portraits through photo bombing and incorporating elements from contemporary sub-cultures, and often incorporates media such as lipstick, eyeliner and human hair. Within this context, the striking images hover between the 17th century and today's climate of uncertainty. Helen Gørrill's collaged and painted portraits have been commissioned from prestigious clients such as the new Bankside Hotel adjacent to Tate Modern in London.

Gorrill's artwork has also been the subject of some controversy. In 2009, her degree show, featuring drawings inspired by religious pamphlets that featured dominant women and sexually submissive men, was censored. In 2018, Gorrill stated that "women can't paint! There's no such thing as a great woman artist!". The Guardian writer Henry Porter wrote, "The male figures have been censored but to protect whom? The spam I receive contains more indecency than Ms Gorrill's work. And it is much less interesting because she makes a valid point."

Gorrill's doctoral and postdoctoral research discovered the emergence of a new "Androgynous Aesthetics" in contemporary British painting since the 1990s and an "Essentialist Aesthetics" in contemporary European painting. She also writes for The Guardian on matters of equality and diversity in the arts, arguing that publicly funded museums are partly responsible for discrimination and the low visibility of contemporary female artists operating today. She also writes for academic presses, such as the International Journal of the Arts in Society, on matters pertaining to art and gender and co-edits the Collective and Collaborative Drawing Conversations series of books published by Cambridge Scholars. Gorrill's book Women Can't Paint: Gender, the Glass Ceiling and Values in Contemporary Art was published in 2020.
