= Andrew Litten =

British painter (born 1970)

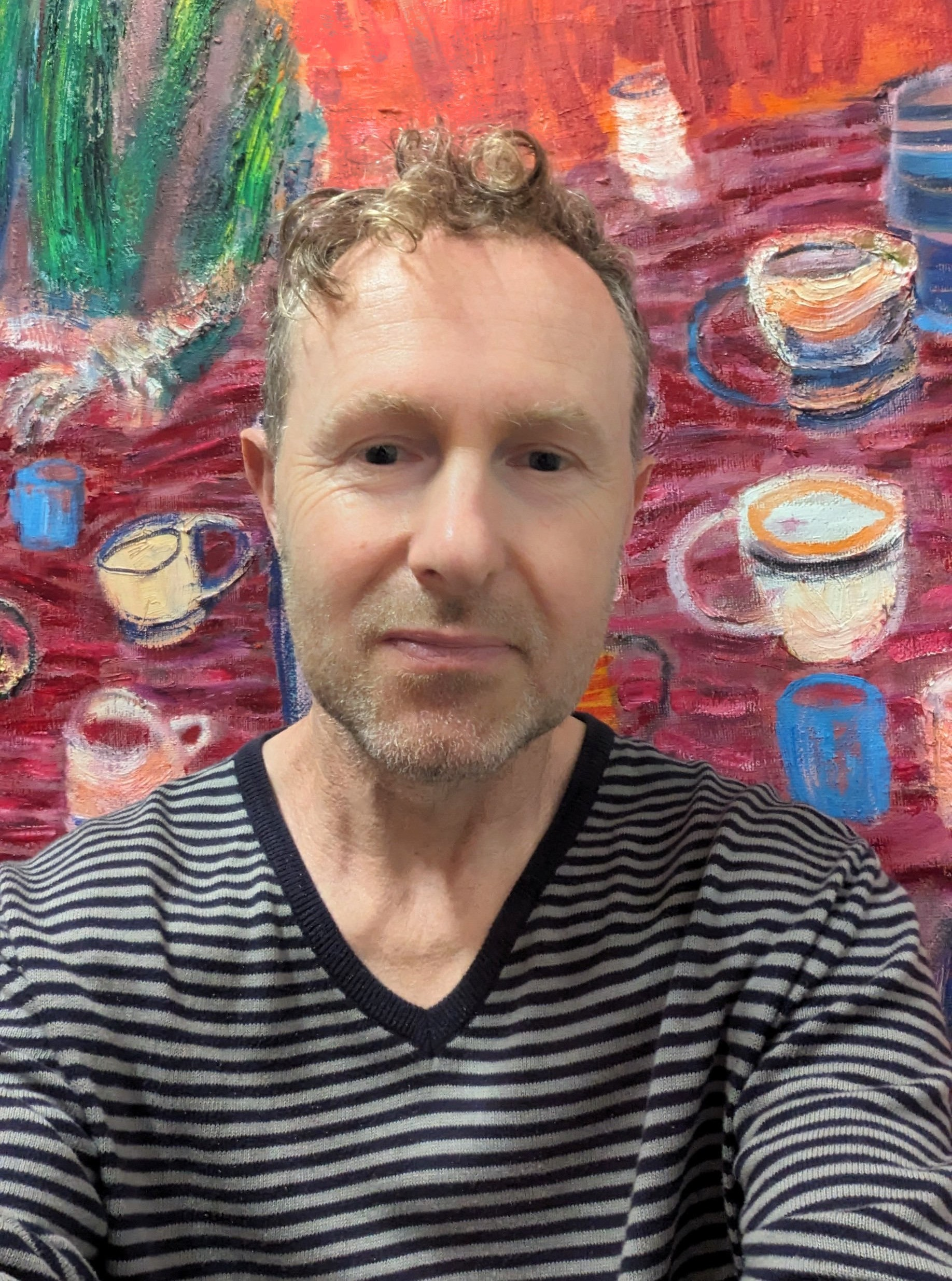
- Litten in 2024
- Born: 13 December 1970 (age 55); Aylesbury, England
- Education: Self-taught
- Occupation: Artist
- Known for: Painting, Sculpture, Assemblage (art)
- Website: Andrew Litten Official

Andrew Litten is a Cornwall-based English artist born in 1970 in Aylesbury, UK. His paintings have been exhibited in the United Kingdom, including the Tate Modern in London, China, USA, Germany, Australia, Mexico, Poland and Italy.

Litten attended Amersham College of Art (now Amersham & Wycombe College) in his teens but found it claustrophobic and restricting so did not continue with higher art education. He is a self-taught painter and sculptor.

He moved to Cornwall in 2001 and chose to begin exhibiting. Early success came in 2003 when his work was included in an exhibition titled 'Nudes' in New York City, (along with Jacob Epstein and Pierre-Auguste Renoir) with a review in the New York Times. In 2007 Litten had his first major London exhibition with "Dog Breeder" created as an anti-art statement on the absurdity of the contemporary art world and its hierarchies.

Recent work (since 2014) deals with humanistic themes such as social alienation, love, sensuality, fear, anger, loss, ageing, addiction, paranoia and other identity disturbance. His dynamic and gestural figurative paintings express a strong interest in the universal complexity of everyday existence.

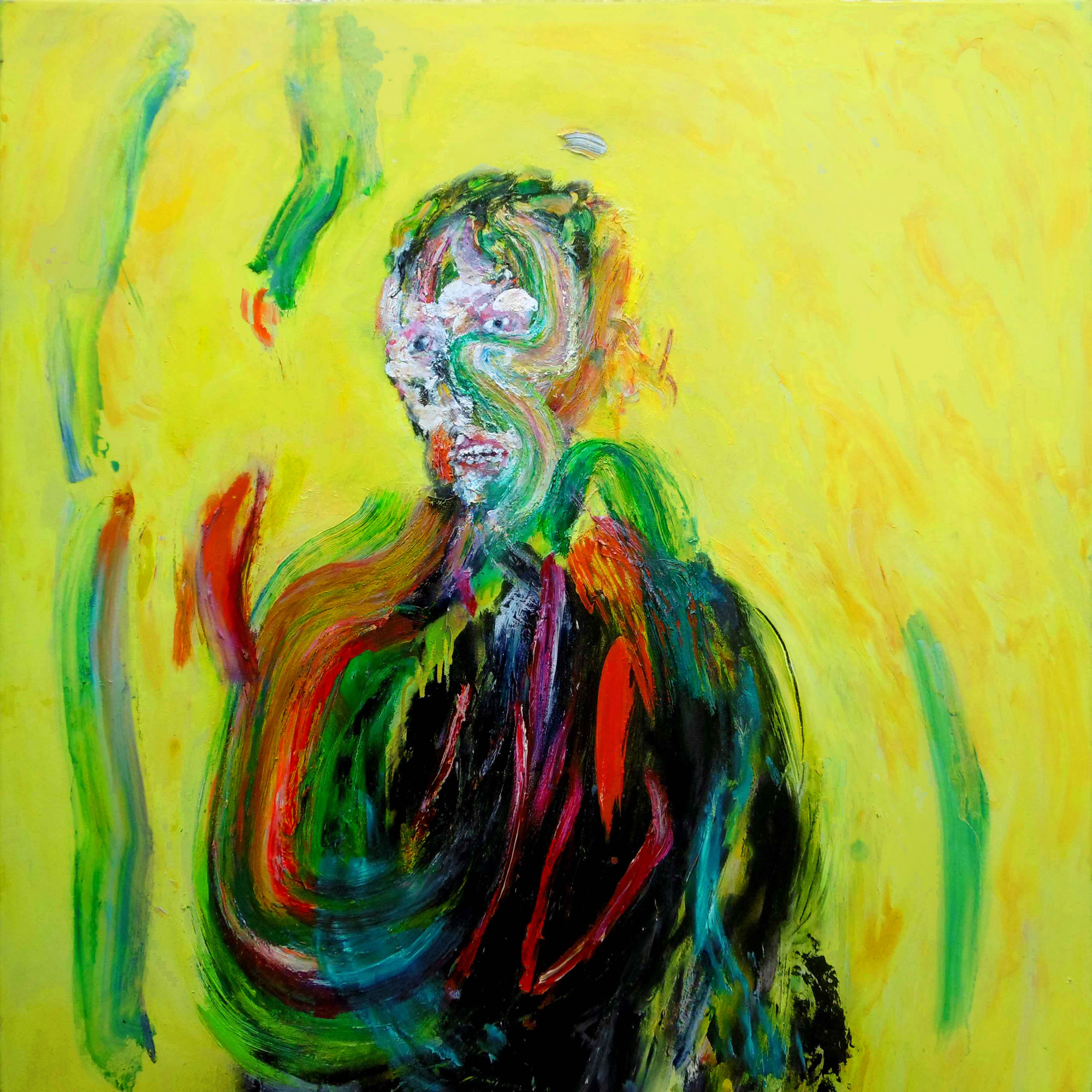
Sudden Involuntary Chemical Withdrawal oiloncanvas 120 x 120cm 2016

== Early life ==
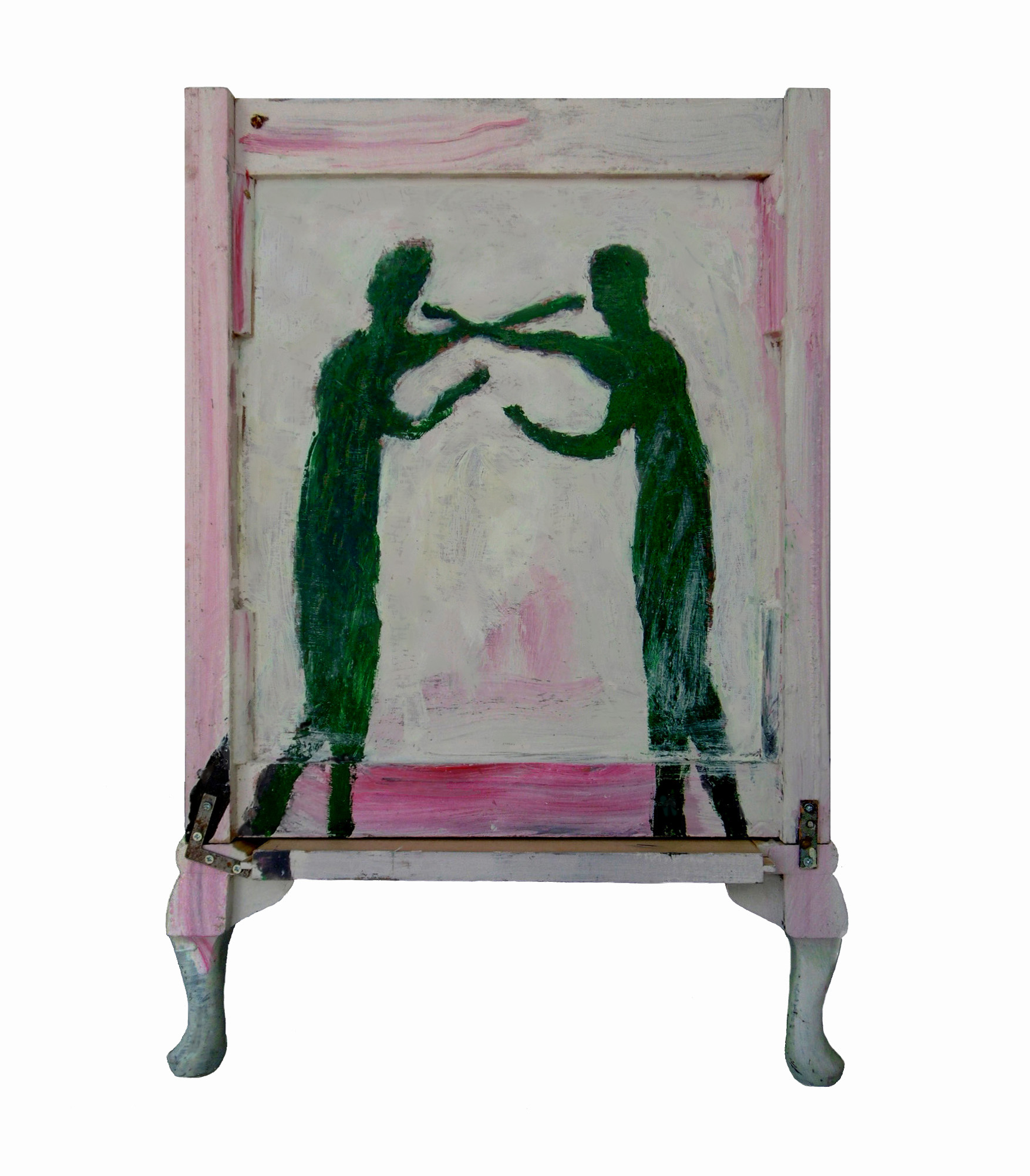
Andrew Litten "Domestic Fight" 1994

At the age of sixteen Litten began taking evening classes in life drawing, with an early interest in expressionist art. He then attended art college as a teenager but found it "restricting and claustrophobic" so left college with the intention of finding inspiration within commonplace life. From 1990 to 1999, he created figurative representations of the ordinary and the everyday that often conveyed emotive poignancy. Litten's paintings and assemblages at this time often referenced song titles, including 'Stepping Out' by The Fall, 'You Always Hurt The One You Love' by The Mills Brothers and 'Kitchen Person' by The Associates.

His use of wit is a striking factor in his work at this time and is manifest in his choice of materials and their appropriateness to his subjects. Joseph Clarke wrote "in Litten's past work, the addition of hair, stuffed creatures, staples, screws, the scraps of paper or board that the work was made on, often created formal as well as emotional shift; important vehicles for helping the strange message within to reveal itself and go to work on the viewer". Often using humble domestic or found materials (including envelopes and assembled furniture parts) the work made at this time deliberately challenged ideas of art elitism and art as commodity.

Retrospective exhibitions of Litten's early work have taken place at Royal Cornwall Museum and the Australia National University.

Litten lived in London in the 1990s and later moved to Oxford where he worked as a photographic assistant and visits to the studio of Richard Hamilton encouraged a renewed interest in painting.

== 2000 to 2014 ==
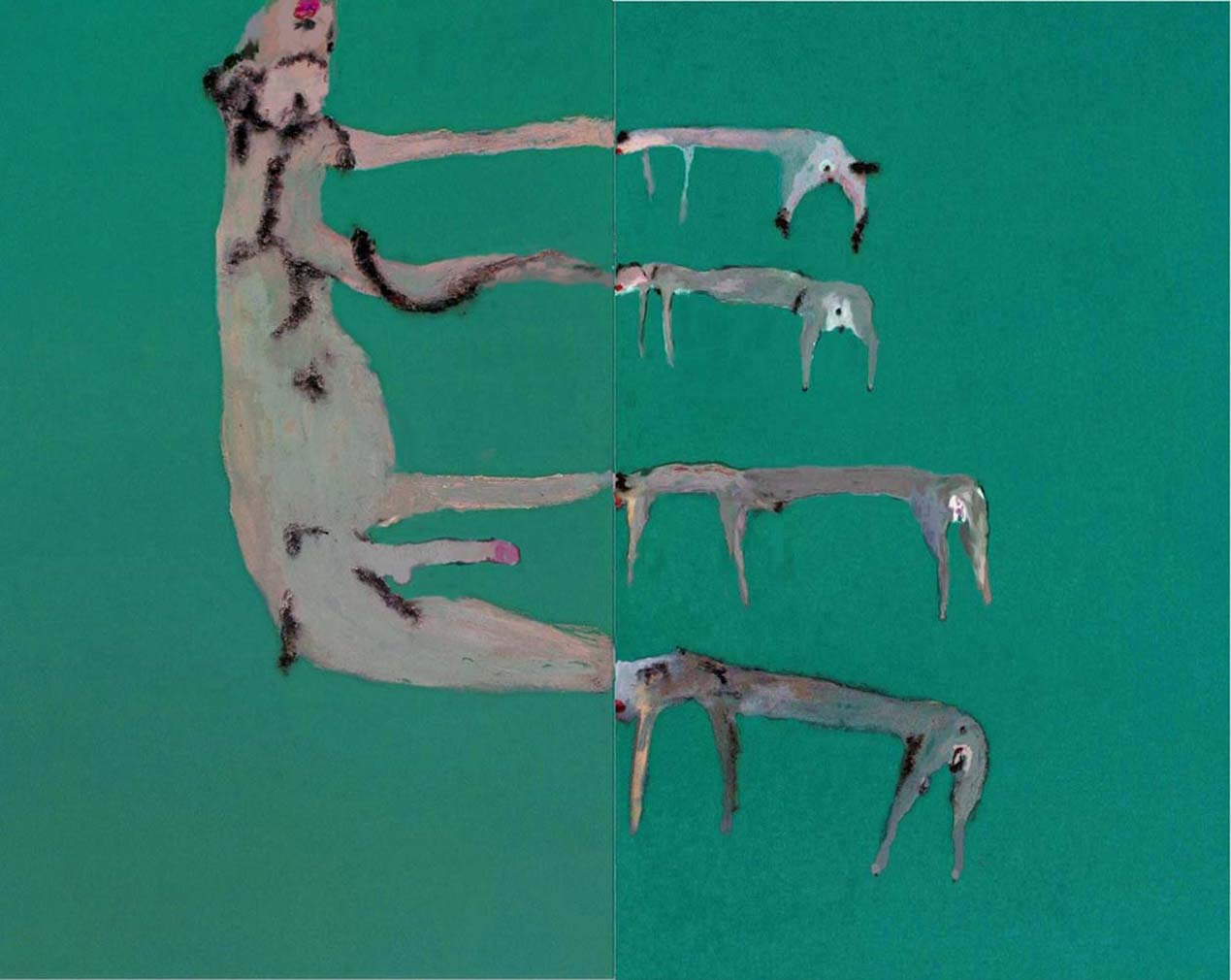
Dog Breeder 2007

Litten moved to Cornwall in 2001 and began exhibiting with Dick The Dog and then Goldfish, along with other independent art spaces in Bristol. His work at this time is considered to be highly emotional, subversive and haunting with subject matter that hints at both our animal impulses and spiritual yearnings. His figurative representations often appear ambiguously expressive and indefinite in sex. During these years, Litten's subject matter deals with issues of voyeurism, dysfunctional sexual attachments and behaviors. Litten's visual narratives at this time are questioning and considered to defy rather than define, with a likeness to the unpunctuated texts of Jack Kerouac.

=== Dog Breeder ===
Dog Breeder (which incorporates paint with human hair) uses a subverted sexual subtext to convey a twisted anti-art statement that comments on the absurdity of the contemporary art world and its hierarchies. The subject refers to the control of the art dealer over artists, and this is represented by the depiction of four sexualised dog-like figures that are on heat and clustering around one large dominant dog human. Dog Breeder was first exhibited in London, Vyner Street during Frieze art week 2007 and then in Cornwall the following year where it was described as sick and depraved.

== Recent Work ==
Litten's dynamic and gestural figurative paintings express interest in a wide range of humanistic themes such as love, sensuality, fear, anger, loss, addiction and personal growth. His large scale gestural and impasto paintings are raw and emotive with introspective tensions that expose the visceral identity of the human subconscious. In 2018 Litten's solo exhibition was developed with support by Arts Council England. Litten's "Concerning the Fragile" works (2019 - 2020) deal with human fragility, beareavment and addiction intensified by the death of his wife, Emma, in 2019.

== Selected solo exhibitions ==
2023 - Connect, JD Malat Gallery, London, UK

2021 - Fragile Together, JD Malat Gallery, London, UK

2020 - Concerning the Fragile, Anima Mundi, St Ives UK

2018 - Ordinary Bodies, Ordinary Bones, Anima Mundi, St Ives, UK

2018 - Archive (selected works 1990-99), Royal Cornwall Museum, Truro, UK

2018 - Impromptu, Drill Hall Gallery, Canberra, Australia

2016 - Need, Patrick Davies Contemporary Art, Hertfordshire, UK

2014 - I Wish You Ill And Hope You Suffer As Much As I Have, Spike Island, Bristol, UK

2013 - ID Smear, Motorcade / FlashParade, Bristol, UK

2012 - Guest, L-13 Light Industrial Workshop, London

2012 - ID Smear, Millennium Gallery St. Ives, UK

2011 - This Is Real, Oo Gallery, New York, USA

2008 - Paintings, Goldfish Fine Art, Penzance, UK

2007 - Connect ? Goldfish Fine Art, Penzance, UK

2007 - Dog Breeder, Lime Wharf Space, London

== Selected group exhibitions ==
2023 - X, Newcastle Contemporary, Newcastle upon Tyne, UK

2022 - Summer Exhibition, JD Malat Gallery, London, UK

2022 - Vitalistic Fantasies, Elysium Gallery, Swansea, UK

2020 - Trinity Buoy Wharf Drawing Prize, The Gallery, De Montfort University, Leicester, UK

2017/18 - Contemporary Masters from Britain: 80 British Painters of the 21st Century, Tianjin Academy of Fine Arts Museum, China, Jiangsu Art Gallery, Nanjing, China, Jiangsu Museum of Arts and Crafts (Artall), Nanjing, China, Yantai Art Museum, China.

2017 - Anything Goes, Art Bermondsey Project Space, London.

2016 - Sixty, Lubomirov / Angus Hughes Gallery, London.

2013 - This Me Of Mine, Ipswich Art School Gallery, Suffolk Museums, Ipswich, UK.

2012 - Kunstfaktor, Marzia Frozen, Berlin, Germany.

2012 - Accidental Genius: Art from the Anthony Petullo Collection, Milwaukee Art Museum, USA.

2011 - Afternoon Tea: Works On Paper, WW Gallery at the 54th Venice Biennale, Italy.

2011 - Concrete Skin, BHVU Gallery, London.

2010 - No Soul For Sale / Exhibition #2, Museum of Everything at the Tate Modern, London.

2009 - The Figure Show, Jill George Gallery, London.

2008 - Mixed / No Theme, Goldfish Fine Art, Penzance, UK.

2007 - Art Now Cornwall ? Goldfish fine Art, Penzance, UK.

2003 - Nudes, Galerie Pelar, New York City, USA.

2002 - Entry, Dick The Dog, Penzance, UK.

== Selected publications ==
The main publications of Litten's work are: ID Smear, Paintings (edited by Joseph Clarke) Connect? Free Range (edited by Joseph Clarke) Ordinary Bodies Everyday Means. His artwork has been used for cover images by publishers Faber and Faber (Plays by David Farr) Bloodaxe Books (Poems by Jane Griffiths) and also within various art publications. L-13 Light Industrial Workshop produced a limited edition hand printed book with Litten in 2012.

== Collections ==
Milwaukee Art Museum, USA

The Priseman Seabrook Collection, UK

Museum of Everything Exhibition #2

Falmouth Art Gallery Collection

== Personal Information ==
Litten has lived in Fowey, Cornwall UK since 2001, he was married to Emma Neame from the four generations of the Neame family in the film business, Emma died in 2019. He is a nominated member of the Newlyn Society of Artists and Contemporary British Painting group.
