= Andrew Parkinson =

Andrew Parkinson may refer to:

- Andrew Parkinson (basketball) (born 1967), Australian basketball player
- Andrew Parkinson (soccer) (born 1959), South African-American soccer player
- Andrew Parkinson (artist) (born 1959), English artist
- Andy Parkinson (born 1979), English footballer
