= Stephen Snoddy =

British artist and gallery director (born 1959)

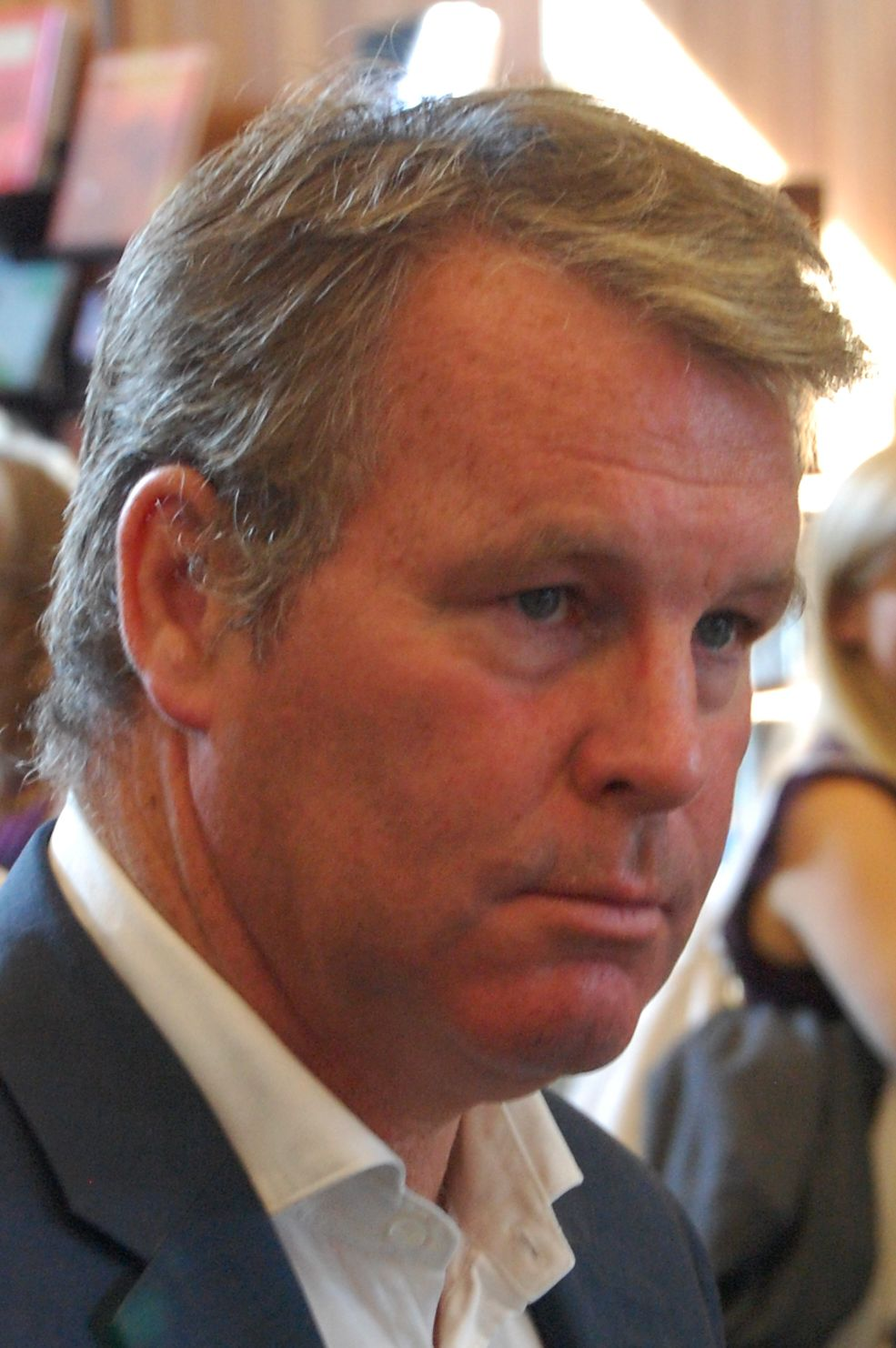
- Snoddy at The New Art Gallery, Walsall, in September 2013
- Born: 1959 (age 66–67); Belfast, Northern Ireland
- Education: Belfast College of Art; University of Manchester
- Occupation: Gallery Director

Stephen Snoddy (born 1959) is a British artist and gallery director.

== Career ==
Snoddy trained as a painter at Belfast College of Art where he graduated in 1983 with an MA in fine art.

Snoddy moved to Manchester in 1986 and graduated with a Postgraduate Diploma in Art Gallery & Museum Studies from the University of Manchester in 1987 and then moved to Bristol to become Exhibitions Organiser at Arnolfini Gallery.

He worked from 1987 to 1991 on an exhibition programme that included solo exhibitions by Richard Long, Giuseppe Penone, Gillian Ayres, Rachel Whiteread, Vong Phaophanit, Jannis Kounellis: Drawings, Jack B. Yeats: The Late Works (which toured to the Whitechapel Art Gallery and Haags Gemeentemuseum) and the first solo exhibition of Juan Muñoz in the UK.

In 1991, Snoddy became Exhibitions Director of Cornerhouse, Manchester, where he and other city curators established the Manchester Gallery Consortium when the Hayward Gallery brought the British Art Show 4 to the city in 1995. He also organised such shows as the first John Baldessari European Retrospective toured to the Serpentine Gallery, London and onwards onto a European tour; a Bruce McLean film commission; Sublime: Manchester Music and Design;Edward Allington; Jochen Gerz; Annette Messager: Telling Tales'; Rita Donagh Retrospective; Paul Seawright: Sectarian Murder and Unveiled: Possibilities in Abstract Painting exhibitions.

In 1996, he moved to become Director of Southampton City Art Gallery, where he and later Henry Moore Foundation director Godfrey Worsdale organised the 1998 Chris Ofili solo exhibition, which helped secure Ofili the 1998 Turner Prize, and an exchange of collections with the Bilbao Museum of Fine Art, to coincide with the opening of the new Frank Gehry-designed Guggenheim Museum Bilbao. He made acquisitions for the collection included works by John Hoyland, Fiona Rae, Chris Ofili, Douglas Gordon and Julian Opie.

In the spring of 1998, he moved to Milton Keynes as founder-director during the construction of a brand new gallery as part of the £30 million Milton Keynes Theatre and Gallery complex. Milton Keynes Gallery (then MK G, now MK Gallery) opened on 8 October 1999 with 'The Rudimentary Pictures', an exhibition of 33 new works by Gilbert & George. There were also exhibitions of Richard Hamilton, Sigmar Polke, Andy Warhol, Juergen Teller, Tim Noble and Sue Webster, Richard Wright, Abigail Lane, Air Guitar: Contemporary Art and Rock Music and The Temple of Bacchus, (Sarah Lucas with Colin Lowe and Roddy Thompson). In October 2003 at the inaugural Frieze Art Fair in Regent's Park, London MK G had a stand which remains the only time a publicly funded art gallery in the UK has had a stand at the FAF.

In December 2003, Snoddy became Director of the BALTIC where he made organisational and structural changes, refreshed the programme and engaged with artists of the region. He was responsible for commissioning Bob and Roberta Smith to create an exhibition in response to the Labour Party Spring Conference of 2004 at the neighbouring the Sage, Gateshead, as well as programming an Edward Kienholz retrospective and the first exhibition of the Italian artist Carol Rama in the UK.

In January 2005, he began to work on freelance projects, acted as consultant to various organisations, lectured at Manchester Metropolitan University and continued to be on the VAGA Executive Board. Snoddy was also appointed in February 2005 as Director of the inaugural Contemporary Art Norwich (CAN05), a multi venued exhibition project, (incorporating the open exhibition EAST) in the city of Norwich during the Summer of 2005.

In May 2005, Snoddy was appointed as Director of The New Art Gallery, Walsall, where he has reviewed policies, restructured the organisation, enabled an acquisitions budget for contemporary art, opened a new 4th floor gallery, expanded the Library & Archive, developed a new sculpture terrace and increased visitor figures annually since 2005 when they were 120,000: in 2010 they reached 201,000. Exhibitions have included 'Starstruck: Contemporary Art and Celebrity'; Christopher Le Brun retrospective; Stuart Whipps - Longbridge Project; Richard Billingham: The Black Country; Jane & Louise Wilson; John Davies: A British Landscape; 'Reimagining Asia', John M. Pickering, Antoinette Haechler, Frank Sidney Smith and 'The Life of the Mind', curated by Bob and Roberta Smith and Zarina Bhimji. The New Art Gallery was also one of the 12 launch venues for Artists' Rooms, (Anthony d'Offay's gift/sale of contemporary art to the nation) and exhibited 52 early Andy Warhol drawings. From 6 October 2012 the NAG exhibited Damien Hirst, for a year-long display. The gallery attracted 236,000 visitors during the year, almost equalling the record set in its opening year.

In 2006, Snoddy was elected as a Fellow of the Royal Society of Arts. Previously he has been a Director of The New Contemporaries and was on the Visual Arts Committee of the British Council for 10 years, taught at numerous art colleges as a visiting lecturer and was on the working committee for the National Policy for Collecting Contemporary Art and Turning Point ACE West Midlands area group.

In 2007, along with Birmingham Museum and Art Gallery and Ikon Gallery, Birmingham who joined to become the West Midlands Consortium they are one of 5 consortium's in the UK to be awarded the £1 million Art Fund International award to purchase international contemporary art over the following 5 years, under the theme of the Metropolis - an interim exhibition Metropolis of acquisitions was launched in the Autumn of 2010. In 2009 he was a judge for the National Portrait Gallery, Taylor Wessing Photographic Portrait Prize which subsequently toured the UK.

In 2009, Snoddy was the Curator for the Art of Ideas in Birmingham. He is a Patron of Walsall College, a former Board member of Lichfield Festival, 'Pestival' and 'The Campaign for Drawing', and was on the Selection Committee for 'Artists Taking the Lead' in the North West of England and was a curatorial advisor working on Anthony McCall's Column for Wirral Waters, intended to be a part of the 2012 Cultural Olympiad, but which was the only 'Artists Taking the Lead' project which was not realised.

He was Director of Look11, the Liverpool International Festival of Photography and Photography, the first photography festival to be staged in Liverpool, during Liverpool's Year of Social Justice and City of Radicals in 2011.

In 2011, at the invitation of the British Council, Snoddy visited Jerusalem and the Palestinian Territories to advise on the development of a potential new Palestinian Museum of Art and on a future collections policy and exhibitions strategy.

Snoddy curated a 2012 exhibition, Wandering Rocks, selected from the Leytonstone Art Trail at The Stone Space, Leytonstone. Wandering Rocks is episode ten of James Joyce's Ulysses, and consists of nineteen short views of characters as they make their way round Dublin in the afternoon.

He was made an Honorary Member of the Royal Ulster Academy at the opening of the RUA Annual Exhibition at the Ulster Museum in Oct 2018 and in 2019 was appointed as a visiting professor at Manchester School of Art.

== Work as an artist ==
Snoddy appeared on Antony Gormley's, One & Other project at Trafalgar Square in August 2009 where he collaborated with Bob and Roberta Smith on realising an art work for the fourth plinth.

In addition to his career as a museum director, Snoddy has made abstract paintings. He is a member of the artist collective Contemporary British Painting and has received solo exhibitions of his work at The Roberto Polo Gallery, Brussels, 2016, The Artist Workhouse, 2016 The Rabley Drawing Centre, 2016 and Southampton City Art Gallery, 2017

=== Collections ===
Paintings by Snoddy are held by the following collections:

- Southampton City Art Gallery
- CORPO, Spain
- Frank Cohen Collection
- Hertfordshire Education Authority
- Lisburn Borough Council
- The Priseman Seabrook Collection

== General references ==
- Interview in Museums Journal, January 2006
