= Colin Self =

English pop artist

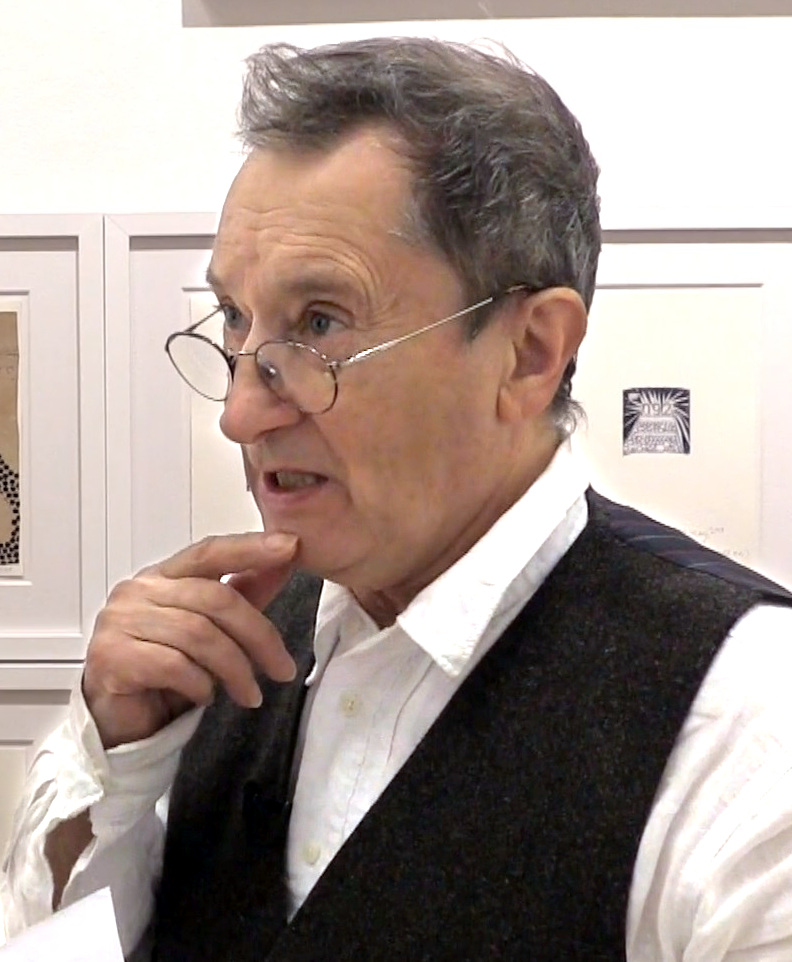
Colin Self, Mayor Gallery, London. December 2015

Colin E Self (born 1941 in Rackheath, Norfolk) is an English Pop Artist whose work has addressed the theme of Cold War politics.

As a student at the Slade School of Fine Art from 1961 to 1963 Colin Self received encouragement for his drawings and collages from the artists David Hockney and Peter Blake. Visits to the United States and Canada in 1962 and 1965 heightened his consciousness of Cold War politics and events such as the Cuban Missile Crisis and the CND marches led him to create highly-innovative prints such as Nuclear Bomber No.1 (1963), one of the earliest multiple plate etchings, and paintings such as ‘Waiting Women and Two Nuclear Bombers’ (1962–63). He also explored the relationship between violence and sexual threat in drawings of glamorous models and his iconic ‘Leopard-skin Nuclear Bomber’ sculptures.

Following his trip to the United States in 1965 he produced a series of drawings based on American nuclear fall-out shelters, Art Deco cinema interiors and of hot dogs. Drawing images from a variety of commercial sources, he created the Power and Beauty series of screenprints (1968) at Editions Alecto.

Suspicious of the commercial art world Self worked in isolation during the 1970s, seeking a sense of solace through the production of atmospheric watercolours and charcoals of the landscapes of his native county Norfolk, and Scotland. From 1972 to 1974 Self worked in collaboration with the German potter Mathies Schwarze at the Töpferei Schwarze Pottery near Cologne, Germany. A trip to the former Soviet Union in 1985-6 provided further stimulus to his explorations of Cold War culture. His collages from the 1980s to the present day combine his interest in Surrealist juxtaposition and the subconscious, with an inventive visual imagination. Some of these works such as ‘Burning Man Jumping from Building’ (1983) and ‘New York Disaster’ (1998) appear remarkably prescient in the light of events such as the attack on the World Trade Center in 2001, while others create lighter, often humorous narratives from found material in everyday life – an extension of the language of Pop art. In 1997 the Tate Gallery held a show of all its holdings of his work. Since 2000 Self has worked on his ‘Odyssey/Iliad’ suite of etchings, in which the artist has returned to his 1960s technique of multiple-plate etching to re-tell the classical story by Homer using contemporary found-imagery and themes.

A retrospective of his work entitled 'Colin Self: Art in the Nuclear Age' was held at Pallant House Gallery in 2008, curated by art historian Simon Martin. Public collections holding work by Colin Self include Arts Council of Great Britain, Museum of Modern Art, Pallant House, Tate Gallery and The Priseman Seabrook Collection.
