= Nanjing Biennale =

Art exhibition in Nanjing, China

The Nanjing Biennale is a contemporary art exhibition held every two years in the city of Nanjing, in Jiangsu province in China. On October 28, 2010. it opened for the first time as an international event, co-hosted by Jiangsu Provincial Art Museum and Endless Contemporary Art Space. The curatorial team of the 2010 edition consisted of Zhu Tong, museum director and curator at Nanjing 4Cube Museum of Contemporary Art, Won-il Rhee and Eleonora Battiston. The theme of the 2010 biennial at Jiangsu Provincial Art Museum was "And_Writers".
