= No Human Way to Kill =

2009 book and artwork by Robert Priseman

- Author: Robert Priseman
- Language: English
- Genre: Law and Order
- Published: June 14, 2009
- Publication place: United Kingdom
- Pages: 102

No Human Way to Kill is a combined book and art project created by British artist Robert Priseman. In 2007 Priseman began work on a series of paintings which present the five different methods of execution used in the United States (Hanging, Firing Squad, Gassing, Lethal Injection and Electrocution), alongside the paintings he then produced a series of twelve etchings looking at other methods of state sanctioned execution used around the world.

The two series examine how different countries have adopted diverse techniques to execute condemned prisoners, which in turn argues execution to be a socially constructed act of group catharsis. 'No Human Way to Kill' was exhibited at The Dazed Gallery in London in 2008 and The White Box Arts Centre, New York in 2010 and 2011. The original paintings and drawings are held at the Mead Art Museum at Amherst College, Massachusetts, USA with a set of twelve etchings at the V&A, London.

In 2009 a book of the same name was published by Seabrook Press which uses the twelve etchings and a series of essays to explore the themes raised. Contributing articles where provided by human rights lawyer Professor Sir Nigel S. Rodley, Rev. Cathy Harrington, San Quentin death row inmate Anthony Ross and former Warden of Texas Death Row Huntsville Unit Jim Willett.
