= Claudia Böse =

British painter

- Born: 1963 (age 61–62); Nueremberg, West Germany (now Germany)
- Occupation: Artist
- Website: http://www.claudiaboese.info/

Claudia Böse (born 1963 in Nueremberg) is an abstract painter and has been based in Suffolk, England, since 2002. Böse graduated from the Royal Academy of Arts in 1996 and is a member of the artists network Kunstnetz International. Her work has been exhibited in London (including eight times with the Royal Academy of Arts), Oxford, Birmingham, Manchester, Berlin, Neukölln, Freiburg, Valparaiso and Miami. Her work has been acquired by Abbot Hall Art Gallery, Hamburger Universität für Wirtschaft und Politik, The Priseman Seabrook Collection and the University of Oxford.

Böse says of her work "My paintings are constructed through process. Most of my paintings reflect and reference the tiny things of our built environment, the minutiae of our surroundings, the surfaces and atmospheres which seem somehow to matter."

== Selected solo exhibitions ==
- "Idiom Two" The Crypt, St Marylebone Parish Church, London (2013)
- "Idiom" The Cut, Halesworth (2013)
- "Transition" The Benham Galleries, Colchester (2010)
- "The Need To Know" Endeavour House, Ipswich (2005)
- "Close-Less" Ipswich Museum (2005)
- "You Then, You Now" Highgate Gallery, London (2003)
- "Pampered Favourites" Basement Gallery, London (2003)
- "Brot und Spiele" Deutsche Bahn, Bergen, Ruegen, (2002)
- "48 Stunden Neukölln, Kuturnetzwerk, Berlin (2001)
- "Cirus Zwei" Putbus, Germany, (2001)
- "Atelier in Neukoelln" Berlin, (2000)
- "Make Your Day" Wolfson College, Oxford (1997)
- "If you were me" Proud Galleries, London (1996)
- "Growing Up On Four Wheels" Mercedes-Benz, London (1995)

== Selected group exhibitions ==
- "Attend" Angelika Studios, High Wycombe, UK (2016)
- "Summer Show" West Gallery, The Quay Arts, Isle of Wight, UK (2016)
- "PING" The Minories, Colchester (2016)
- "Salon 8" The Old Lock Up Studio, Cromford, Derbyshire (2016)
- "How soon is Now" Nottingham Society of Artists (2016)
- "Chinese Whispers" Fischmuellers, Freiburg, Germany (2016)
- "Contemporary British Watercolours" Burton Art Gallery & Museum, Bideford (2016)
- "sad but true" Jerwood DanceHouse, Ipswich (2016)
- "Contemporary British Watercolours" Maidstone (2015)
- "Obscure Secure" Studio 1.1, London (2015)
- "Contemporary British Abstraction" SE9 Container Gallery, London (2015)
- "Contemporary British Painting" Huddersfield Art Gallery (2014)
- "Obscure Secure" Christchurch Mansion, Ipswich Museum (2014)
- "Contemporary British Painting" St Marylebone Parish Church, Crypt, London (2014)
- "About Painting" Castlefield Gallery, Manchester (2014)
- "A Dream within a Dream" Bankley Studios & Gallery, Manchester (2014)
- "Contemporary British Painting" St Marylebone Church, Crypt, London (2013)
- "Summer Saloon Show" Art Britannia, Lion & Lamb, Miami, Florida (2013)
- "Hey, Narcissus" studio 1.1, London (2013)
- "This year's model" studio 1.1, London (2013)
- "Royal Academy in East Anglia" Wingfield Barns, Suffolk (2012)
- "Anonyme" Zeichner, Berlin (2006)
- "Gracias" Fundacion Valparaiso, Mojacar, Spain (2005)
- "20th Century Perspectives" Burlington Galleries, London (2004)
- "Un-earth" Sutton Hoo, National Trust, Woodbridge (2004)
- "Art in Mental Health" Birmingham Museum and Art Gallery (2004)
- "Art in Mental Health" Talbot Rice Gallery (2004)
- "Art in Mental Health" Royal College of Art, London (2004)
- "Royal Academy Summer Exhibition" Royal Academy of Arts (2003)
- "Drawings for All" Gainsborough's House, Sudbury (2002)
- "Gleitflug" Passewaldscher Hof, Berlin (2002)
- "Royal Academy Summer Exhibition" Royal Academy of Arts (2002)
- "Ateliergemeinschaft" Neukoelln, Berlin (2000)
- "Royal Academy Summer Exhibition" Royal Academy of Arts (1996)
- "Premiums" Royal Academy of Arts, London (1995)
- "Small objects of Desire" City Gallery (Leicester) (1995)
- "Royal Academy Summer Exhibition" Royal Academy of Arts (1995)
- "Making a Mark" Mall Galleries, London
- "Genitals are Beauty" William Blake House, London (1994)
- "Premiums" Royal Academy of Arts, London (1994)
- "Royal Academy Summer Exhibition" Royal Academy of Arts (1993)
- "Premiums" Royal Academy of Arts, London (1993)

== Selected collections ==
- Abbot Hall Art Gallery
- Hamburger Universität für Wirtschaft und Politik
- The Priseman Seabrook Collection
- University of Oxford
