= The Priseman Seabrook Collection =

Priseman Seabrook Collection
- Established: 2014
- Founders: Robert Priseman and Ally Seabrook
- Location: United Kingdom
- Website: www.priseman-seabrook.org

The Priseman Seabrook Collection is a British-based private collection founded by the artist Robert Priseman and his wife Ally Seabrook. It is composed of three distinct categories: 21st Century British Painting, 20th and 21st Century British Works on Paper and Contemporary Chinese Works on Paper, and is a collection partner of Art UK.

The Priseman Seabrook Collection of 21st Century British Painting is the only art collection in the United Kingdom dedicated to painting produced in Britain after the year 2000 and was exhibited publicly for the first time in 2014 at the Huddersfield Art Gallery while works from the other two elements of the collection were first displayed at the Minories Art Gallery in Colchester during 2016.

Subsequent exhibition loans have been made to the China Academy of Art, Hangzhou, The University of Suffolk, The Cut, Halesworth Jiangsu Art Gallery, Nanjing, Artall, Nanjing, Tianjin Academy of Fine Arts, Tianjin and Yantai Art Museum, China.

The focus of each collection is placed on painting and drawing made by hand, with the emphasis being designed to explore and question the relevance of the handmade work of art in the period of the digital revolution.

== History ==
The collection was created in 2014 and contains over 180 works of art by painters including Iain Andrews, Amanda Ansell, Claudia Böse, Julian Brown, Simon Burton, Simon Carter, Lucy Cox, Pen Dalton, Alan Davie, Nathan Eastwood, Tracey Emin, Lucian Freud, Terry Greene, Susan Gunn, Susie Hamilton, Alex Hanna, David Hockney, Marguerite Horner, Linda Ingham, Matthew Krishanu, Andrew Litten, Cathy Lomax, Paula MacArthur, David Manley, Nicholas Middleton, Paul Nash, Stephen Newton, Mandy Payne, Alison Pilkington, John Piper, Eric Ravilious, Greg Rook, Colin Self, Stephen Snoddy, Graham Sutherland, Judith Tucker, Julie Umerle and Mary Webb.

The core of the initial collection was formed from donations, painting swaps and small scale purchases, with the aim of finding and exhibiting more obscure artists alongside those with established reputations. This has been further added to with the annual purchase of the winning painting from the 'Contemporary British Painting Prize' which then enters the Priseman Seabrook collection.

In 2017 the charity Art UK who enable the public to see images of all the approximately 210,000 oil paintings in public ownership in the United Kingdom via catalogues and a website made The Priseman Seabrook Collection a partner.
