= Andrew Parkinson (artist) =

British painter (born 1959)

- Education: Trent Polytechnic (Nottingham Trent University)
- Occupation: Artist
- Website: Andy Parkinson

Andrew Parkinson (Andy) was born in 1959 in Burnley, Lancashire, England and lives and works in Nottingham, England. He studied art at Trent Polytechnic (now Nottingham Trent University) graduating in 1980.

Parkinson's paintings display evidence of a systems based process which explores themes of identity and similarity, repetition and the impossibility of repetition.

== Selected exhibitions ==
2017/18 - Contemporary Masters from Britain: 80 British Painters of the 21st Century, Tianjin Academy of Fine Arts Museum, China, Jiangsu Art Gallery, Nanjing, China, Jiangsu Museum of Arts and Crafts (Artall), Nanjing, China, Yantai Art Museum, China

2017 - Colour A Kind Of Bliss, The Crypt, Marylebone, London

2017 - Abstractions, Line Gallery, Stroud, UK

2016 - Imperfect Reverse, Camberwell Space Projects, Camberwell College of Arts, London

2015 - Clear Sight, Sluice Art Fair, London

2015 - Geometry: Wonky and Otherwise, Déda, Derby, UK

2015 - Summer Mix, Turps Banana Gallery, London

2015 - Generator; Systems, Logic and the Analogue Art of Programming, Kaleidoscope Gallery, Kent, UK

2015 - Contemporary British Abstraction, SE9 Container Gallery, London

2014 - Grey, Harrington Mill Studios, Nottingham, UK

2014 - Pareidolia, Pluspace, Coventry, UK

2014 - Launchpad; About Painting, Castlefield Gallery, Manchester, UK

2013 - Art Britania, Art Basel, Miami Beach, USA

2013 - The Discipline of Painting, Harrington Mill Studios, Nottingham, UK

== Collections ==
The Priseman Seabrook Collection, UK
