= Pen Dalton =

British painter

- Born: Penelope Dalton; England
- Education: Goldsmiths, University of London; University of Brighton; Plymouth University
- Occupations: Artist, critic, writer
- Employer(s): Dartington College of Arts; Birmingham City University

Penelope Dalton is an artist, critic and writer.

== Education ==
Dalton trained at Goldsmiths, University of London and Brighton University, and gained a PhD in Creative Studies from Plymouth University in 2008.

== Career ==
Dalton taught studio practice and critical theory at Dartington College of Arts and Birmingham City University.

She spent many years as an academic researcher in socially contextualised practice in printmaking and art education, drawing on feminist and linguistic theory. In recent years she has eschewed 'theory'. The arts - she now believes - are being absorbed within the economies of entertainment, social welfare and consumerism. Her recent work returns to a modernist approach, and focusses on the materiality of painting as an imaginative practice of analogy and poetics.

== Exhibitions ==
=== Solo exhibitions ===
- "Different strokes" Westminster Reference Library. London, (2017)
- "Paint Jobs" St Marylebone Parish Church Crypt, London (2015)
- "Stuff and Nonsense" Tokarska Gallery, London (2014)

=== Group exhibitions ===
- "Contemporary Painting: In Good Health", The Menier Gallery, London (2017)
- "Stations of the Cross", Brentwood Cathedral (2015)
- "Contemporary British Abstraction", SE9 Container Gallery, London (2015)
- "Contemporary British Painting", Huddersfield Art Gallery (2014)
- "@PaintBritain", Ipswich Art School Gallery, Ipswich Museum (2014)
- "Artness", Artmeet Gallery, Milan, Italy (2014)
- "A World to Win: Posters of Protest and Revolution", Victoria and Albert Museum, London (2014), William Morris Gallery (2016)
- "Propaganda Posters From the Schreyer Collection", Victoria and Albert Museum, London (2002)
- "Exposition de Grabado Contemporaneo [Eight contemporary women printmakers]", Circulo de Bellas Artes, Madrid, Spain British Council (1998)
- "The Power of the Poster", Victoria and Albert Museum, London (1998)
- "Women's Art", Spacex, Exeter (1989)
- "Prints With a Point", Hard Times Gallery, Bristol (1987)
- "3 Women Artists", Battersea Arts Centre, London (1984)
- "Reflections: 5 Women Artists", Aspex Gallery, Portsmouth (1982)

== Collections ==
- Musée de la Publicité, Paris
- Komechak Art Gallery, Chicago
- The Priseman Seabrook Collection
- Swindon Art Gallery
- Victoria and Albert Museum, London
- The Working Class Archive
- Goldsmiths Archives catalogue
- Feminist Archive South, UK

== Publications ==
- (2008) Pen Dalton: Doctoral thesis: Family and Other Relations
- (2006) Pen Dalton: '"Like"' in Henry Rogers, (ed.) Art Becomes You: Parody, Pastiche and the Politics of Art: Materiality in a Post-material Paradigm. BIAD/IKON Gallery. Article Press. ISBN 1 873352 98 0
- (2006) Pen Dalton: 'Where is 'the subject' of contextual practice?' in The Journal of Visual Art Practice, Intellect Publishers. vol. 3 no 1 ISSN 1470-2029
- (2006) Pen Dalton: 'Feminist Methodologies in Art Education: Critique' in The International Journal, n.paradoxa, vol. 17, pp 72–76. ISSN 1461-0434
- (2003) Pen Dalton: critical essay: 'Losing it' in Lloyd Lewis, P. and Shaffrey C., (eds) Losing It: a catalogue for an exhibition of screen based video, Fenton Gallery, Cork, Eire. pp. 1–4. Article Press. ISBN 1873352 78 6
- (2001) Pen Dalton. book: The Gendering of Art Education : Modernism, Identity and Critical Feminism.
- (1999) Pen Dalton: 'Oedipal dramas in art education' in The International Journal of Art and Design Education. vol.18 no 3 October. pp. 301–306
- (1995) Pen Dalton: 'Modernism, art education and sexual difference' in Barrie, P. and Deepwell, K ads. New Feminist Art Criticism. Manchester University Press.
- (1992) Pen Dalton: 'Psychology and the subject of art education' in J& J Swift (ends) Disciplines, Fields, Change in Art Education, vol 3 Article Press. pp. 83–96 ISBN 1873352 43 3
- (1979) Pen Dalton: 'What is art education for? Feminist Art News no 1 Spring. (1980) 'What is art education for? (reprinted) Pollock G and Parker, R. (eds) Framing Feminism: Art and the Women's Movement. 1970–85. Pandora ISBN 0863581781
- (1978) Pen Dalton: 'Feminist art practice and the mass media' in Feminist Arts News, no 1; reprinted (1979) in Women's Studies International Journal vol 3 no 1, reprinted (1980) in Baerh, H. (ed) Women and Media, Oxford, Pergamon Press ISBN 0080260616
