= Matthew Krishanu =

English painter

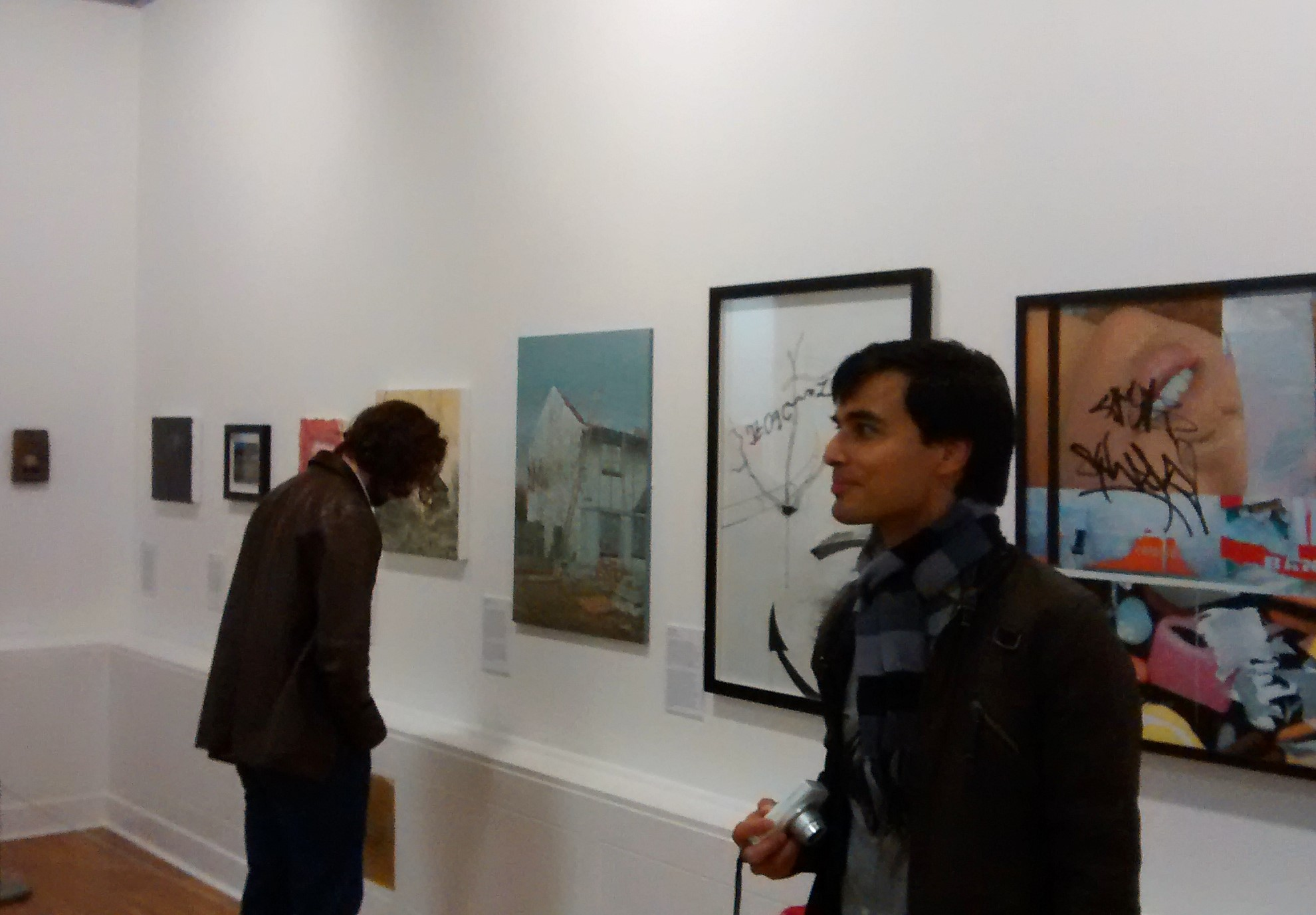
- Painter Matthew Krishanu at a private view in England, 2014
- Born: Bradford, England
- Occupations: Artist, curator, writer
- Website: Matthew Krishanu

Matthew Krishanu was born in Bradford, England in 1980. He graduated from The University of Exeter with a BA (Hons) in Fine Art and English Literature in 2001 and completed a master's degree in Fine Art at Central Saint Martins, University College of the Arts London in 2009. His exhibitions include 'Contemporary British Painting', Huddersfield Art Gallery (2014), 'Another Country', The Nunnery, London (2014), 'We Were Trying to Make Sense', 1Shanthiroad Gallery, Bangalore, (2013), 'In Residence' (solo exhibition), Parfitt Gallery, London (2010); 'The Mausoleum of Lost Objects', Iniva, London (2008).

Krishanu's essays and articles on art have been published by The Courtauld Gallery, British Council, and a-n Magazine. He has curated collaborative exhibitions for English Heritage and Iniva, and co-curated exhibitions at the RIBA and Whitechapel Gallery. He is a visiting lecturer at Chelsea College of Arts and teaches at Camden Arts Centre and The Courtauld Institute of Art.

In his own paintings, Krishanu creates work from memory and photographs, 're-imagining' events through editing, simplifying and layering. In one of his painting he explained "My subject matter is often autobiographical, drawing on memories and photographs – particularly of my childhood in Bangladesh. Rather than straight autobiography, I prefer to work with imagery that has open narratives."

== Selected solo exhibitions ==
- "Mission" St Marylebone Crypt, St Marylebone Parish Church, London (2013)
- "In Residence'’ Parfitt Gallery, London (2010)

== Selected group exhibitions ==
- '‘Aviary'’ Transition Gallery, London (2016)
- '‘The Names'’ Transition Gallery, London (2016)
- '‘Contemporary Drawings from Britain'’ Xi'an Academy of Fine Arts, Xi'an, China (2015)
- '‘London Painters' Survey'’ Artworks Project Space, London (2015)
- '‘Stations of the Cross'’ Brentwood Cathedral, London (2015)
- '‘Another Country (with Cara Nahaul)'’ Nunnery Gallery, London (2014)
- '‘Priseman-Seabrook Collection'’ Huddersfield Art Gallery (2014)
- '‘@PaintBritain'’ Ipswich Museum (2014)
- '‘Monster Club'’ The Works, Birmingham (2014)
- '‘Untitled 1: Glitch'’ Peacock Projects, London (2013)
- '‘Behind Closed Doors'’ Artworks Project Space, London (2013)
- '‘We Were Trying to Make Sense'’ 1Shanthiroad Gallery, Bangalore, India (2013)
- '‘BAT Pack III'’ Mile End Art Pavilion, London (2012)
- '‘Salon Art Prize 10'’ selected by Kate MacGarry, MRA Project Space, London
- '‘This is England'’ Centre for Contemporary Art, Preston; Beaconhouse National University Gallery, Lahore (2010)
- '‘The Mausoleum of Lost Objects'’ Iniva, London (2008)

== Selected collections ==
- Beaconhouse University Gallery, Lahore
- China Academy of Art
- Komechak Art Gallery, Chicago
- The Priseman Seabrook Collection, UK
