= Paula MacArthur =

British painter

- Born: Enfield, England
- Occupation: Artist
- Website: www.paula-macarthur.com

Paula MacArthur (born 1967 in Enfield, London) is an English artist. MacArthur was joint first prize winner in 1989 of the ‘John Player Portrait Award’ at the National Portrait Gallery, London with Tai-Shan Schierenberg. In 1993 she graduated from the Royal Academy of Arts where she was awarded the ‘Royal Academy Schools Prize for Painting’, that same year she was a prize winner of ‘Liverpool John Moores 18’. Her work is held in numerous collections including The National Portrait Gallery, London the collection of Baron and Baroness von Oppenheim and The Priseman Seabrook Collection.

MacArthur has lectured on her work at the Walker Art Gallery, Liverpool, Norwich University of the Arts, Jerwood Gallery, Hastings and Glasgow Artist Guild. She ran the De La Warr Pavilion ‘Artist Critique Group’ until 2019.

MacArthur's recent work has focused on painting gem stones and crystals.

== Selected exhibitions ==
- "Entwined: Plants in Contemporary Painting" Huddersfield Art Gallery, Huddersfield, England (2022)
- “Slippery & Amorphous” The Crypt, St Marylebone Parish Church (2016)
- “This Year's Model” Studio 1.1, London (2016)
- “Undead Painters” ASC Gallery, London (2015)
- “Creekside Open” Art in Perpetuity Trust (APT Gallery), London (2015)
- “Disturbance” Atom Gallery, London (2015)
- “OVERHE(a)R(e)” Carnegie Library, London (2015)
- “Infinitely Precious Things” VJB Arts, London (2014)
- “Q14” Art in Perpetuity Trust (APT Gallery), London (2014)
- “OVERHE(a)R(e)” Aplomb Gallery, Chicago, USA (2014)
- “Le Voci Ritrovate” Castello di Monti, Corigliano d’Otranto, Italy (2014)
- “Zeitgeist Summer Exhibition” Zeitgeist Arts Projects, London (2014)
- “The Femail Project” The Article Gallery, Birmingham City University (2013)
- “Tasty Modern” Schwartz Gallery, London (2013)
- “Minutiae” The Stone Space, London (2012)
- “What the Folk Say” Compton Verney, Warwickshire (2011)
- “Remasters” The Rag Factory, London (2010)
- “Four Self Portrait Artists” Walker Art Gallery, Liverpool (1994)
- “Royal Academy of Arts Post-Graduates” Grassimuseum, Leipzig, Germany (1993)
- “Royal Academy of Arts Summer Exhibition” Royal Academy of Arts, London (1991)
- “Young Contemporaries” Whitworth Art Gallery, Manchester (1989)

== Selected collections ==
- National Portrait Gallery, London
- The Priseman Seabrook Collection

== Awards ==
- Prize winner, , Walker Art Gallery, Liverpool (1993)
- Royal Academy Schools Prize for painting (1993)
- First Prize Winner, John Player Portrait Award, National Portrait Gallery, London (1989)
