= Nathan Eastwood =

British painter

- Born: Barrow-in-Furness, England
- Occupation: Artist
- Website: Nathan Eastwood

Nathan Eastwood was born in Barrow-in-Furness, England in 1972. He graduated from Byam Shaw School of Art in 2009.

Eastwood was a finalist in the 2007 'Celeste Art Prize' and won the inaugural 'East London Painting Prize' in 2014. He paints everyday domestic and urban scenes of people he records on his mobile phone. Eastwood works in monochrome by applying enamel paint to board in thin layers. Of his work Eastwood says: "Central to my painting practice is a re-examination of kitchen sink realism."

Exhibitions include: 'Work/Recreation/Freedon/' at the Nunnery Gallery, London (2014), 'Present Tense' at Swindon Art Gallery (2015), '@PaintBritain', Ipswich Museum (2014), 'Towards a New Socio-Painting', Transition Gallery, London (2014), 'Royal Academy Summer Show' Royal Academy of Arts, London (2013) and 'The John Moore's Painting Prize' Walker Art Gallery, Liverpool (2012). Permanent collections include: The Zabludovicz Collection(London), Goldhill Family (London), The Priseman Seabrook Collection and Swindon Art Gallery.

== Selected solo exhibitions ==
- "Laptop and Chips" The SE9 Container Gallery London (2016)
- "Work/Recreation/Freedom" Nunnery Gallery, London (2014)
- "Domestic Realism" St Marylebone Parish Church, London (2014)

== Selected group exhibitions ==
- "Aviary" Transition Gallery, London (2016)
- "Anti-Social Realism" Charlie Smith Gallery, London (2015)
- "Documentary Realism: Painting in the Digital Age" The Crypt, St Marylebone Parish Church, London (2015)
- "Present Tense" Swindon Art Gallery (2015)
- "@PaintBritain" Ipswich Museum (2014)
- "Contemporary British Painting" Huddersfield Art Gallery (2014)
- "Towards a New Socio-Painting" Transition Gallery, London (2014)
- "This Year's Model" Studio1.1, Shoreditch, London (2014)
- "Contemporary British Painting" The Crypt, St Marylebone Parish Church, London (2013)
- "Zeitgeist Arts Projects" ASC Studios, London (2013)
- "Threadneedle Prize" (finalist) Mall Galleries, London (2013)
- "Royal Academy Summer Show" Royal Academy of Arts, London (2013)
- "John Moore's Painting Prize" Walker Art Gallery, Liverpool (2012)
- "Platform C's Emergent Art Show" Vyner Street Gallery, London (2011)
- "Artworks Open 2010" Barbican Arts Group Trust, E17, London (2010)
- "17 Ingredients Measures of Autonomy" Studio One, London (2009)

== Selected collections ==
- The Priseman Seabrook Collection
- Swindon Art Gallery
- Poju Zabludowicz - Zabludowicz Collection
