= Greg Rook =

English painter

- Born: Gregory Adrian Rook; 14 December 1971 (age 54); London, UK
- Education: University of London
- Known for: Painting

Greg Rook (born 1971 in London) is an English painter, known for contemporary figurative paintings capturing the hopes, dreams and successes as well as the disappointments, disillusionment and disasters that radical departures from home life and mainstream society can entail. He studied at Chelsea School of Art 1997–2000 and Goldsmiths College 2000–2002. In 2014 he was shortlisted for the East London Painting Prize. Since 2016 he teaches Fine Art at the London Southbank University.

== Solo exhibitions ==
- 2019 - Honyocker, V&A Space, Fabbrica del Vapore, Milan
- 2016 - Off-Grid, The Storeroom, London
- 2015 - Off-Grid, The Aldridge Gallery, Farnham
- 2013 - On the Prospect of Establishing a Pantisocracy, Fred London Ltd
- 2012 - Survivors, OMT Gallery, London
- 2009 - Clean Skins, Vegas Gallery, London
- 2007 - We Live Like This, Lounge Gallery, London
- 2005 - Myth II, Gallery Min Min, Tokyo
- 2005 - Myth, Gallery Min Min, Tokyo
- 2004 - Salvation is a Cowgirl, Adam Street, London
- 2004 - The Importance of Disappointment, Electric Palace, Hastings
- 2003 - Sirens, Gallery Min Min, Tokyo
- 2001 - Greg Rook, Gallery Min Min, Tokyo

== Selected group exhibitions ==
- 2015 - Autocatalytic Future Games, No Format, London
- 2015 - The Office of Gravitational Documents, Galerie Laurent Mueller, Paris
- 2015 - Sunday in the Park with Ed, Display Gallery, London
- 2015 - Present Tense, Swindon Museum and Art Gallery, England
- 2014 - The Zeitgeist Open 2014, Zeitgeist Arts Projects, London
- 2014 - Paint Britain, Ipswich Art School Gallery, Colchester and Ipswich Museums, England
- 2014 - Priseman/Seabrook Collection, Huddersfield Art Gallery, England
- 2014 - East London Painting Prize, Bow Arts, London
- 2013 - The Things of Life, Flowers, London
- 2013 - Timeslip, Gallery Stock, Berlin
- 2012 - Marmite IV, UK
- 2012 - Passage, Blindarte Contemporanea, Naples
- 2012 - Augment, Catalyst Arts, Belfast
- 2012 - Past and Present, OMT Gallery, London
- 2012 - The Perfect Nude, The Charlie Smith Gallery, London
- 2011 - The Perfect Nude, Wimbledon Space, London
- 2011 - Crash Open, Charlie Dutton Gallery, London
- 2011 - Graceland, Trailer, London
- 2010 - Crash Open, Charlie Dutton Gallery, London
- 2009 - I am by birth a Genovese, Galerie Forde, Geneva
- 2009 - These Here United States, Master Piper, London
- 2009 - The Royal Republic, Master Piper, London
- 2009 - Giddee up!, University of the Arts, London
- 2007 - Wintry, Lounge Gallery, London
- 2006 - Sensuous Panorama, Lounge Gallery, London
- 2006 - Brownfield, Lounge Gallery, London and Mac, Birmingham
- 2005 - A Moment in Time, Temple Bar Gallery, Dublin
- 2005 - The Lost Night, The Prenelle Gallery, London
- 2005 - Current Vision, Sartorial Contemporary Art, London
- 2005 - Urban Bodies, 127 Brick Lane, London
- 2004 - Caution - Uneven Surfaces, Temporary Contemporary, London
- 2004 - SV04, Studio Voltaire, London
- 2003 - Godzilla, Trailer, London
- 2002 - The Four Colleges, AT Kearney, London
- 2000 - Future Map 2000, The London Institute, London
- 2000 - Summer Contemporary, Blains Fine Art, London
- 1999 - The Last Show on Earth, Clerkenwell, London

== Collections ==
- The Madison Museum of Fine Art, Georgia
- The Swindon Museum and Art Gallery
- The Priseman Seabrook Collection
- The Devereux Collection
- The Lesmes Collection
- The David Roberts Collection
- The University of the Arts Collection

== Bibliography ==
- James Brooks, Greg Rook: We Live Like This, Lounge Gallery, London, 2007.
- Matt Price, Andrea Vento, Joe Gilmore, Michele Robecchi, Greg Rook: Honyocker, Anomie Publishing, London, 2019.

== Press ==
- Creegan, Matthew. 5 Things You Need to Know About Greg Rook. The Culture Trip, March 2015.
- Mercer, Alison. An Interview with Greg Rook. 2012
- Lack, Jessica. Greg Rook: We Live Like This. The Guardian, February 2007.
