= Judith Tucker =

British artist (1960–2023)

- Born: 1960; Bangor, Gwynedd, Wales
- Died: 13 November 2023 (aged 63)
- Occupations: Artist, academic
- Website: judithtuckerartist.com

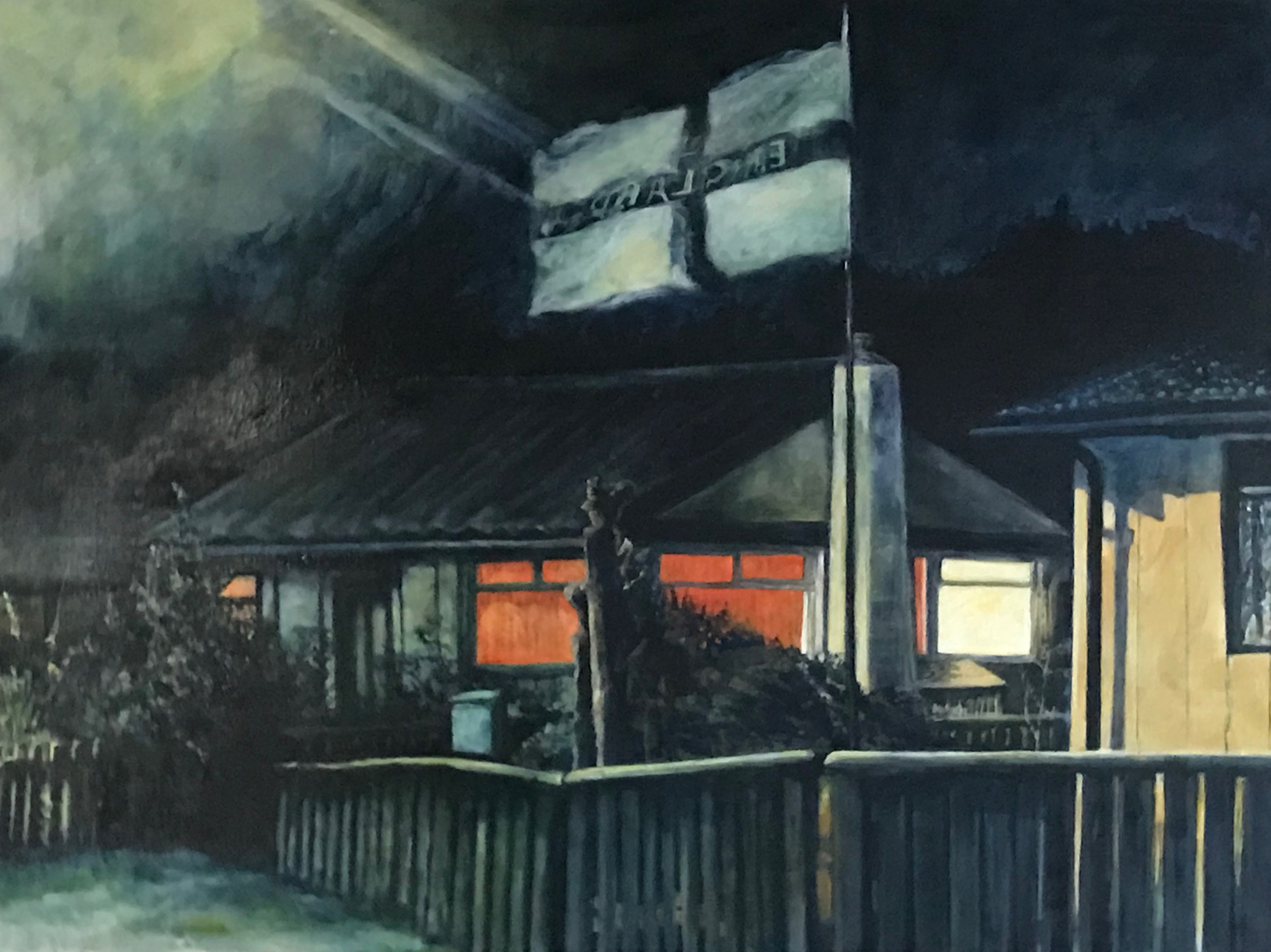
oil on canvas

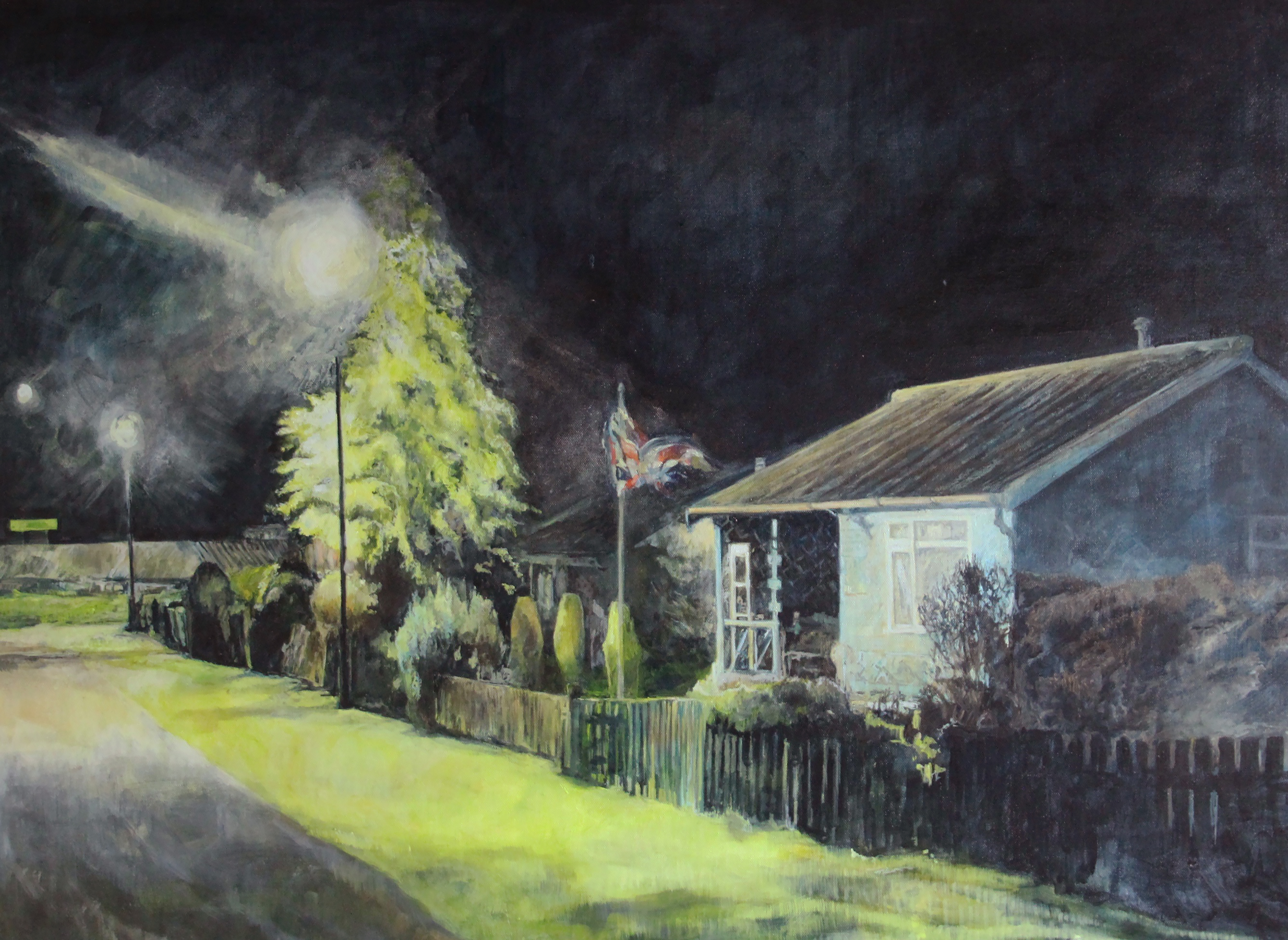
oil on canvas

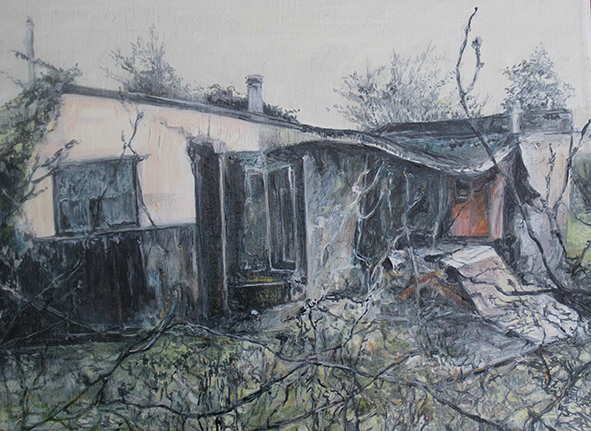
Judith Tucker, 2015 Oil on Canvas 12” x 16”

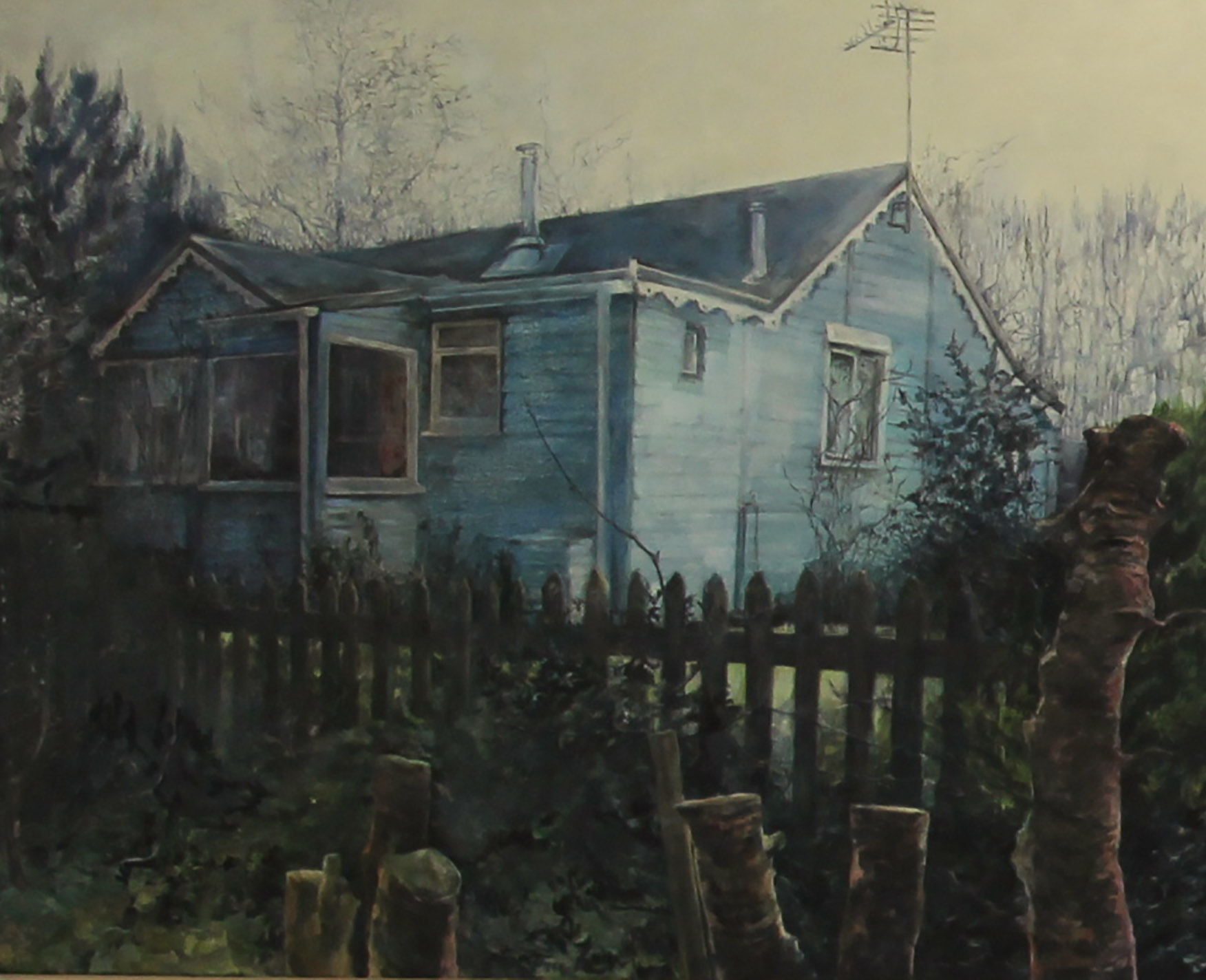
Judith Tucker 2016, Oil on Canvas 36” x 48”

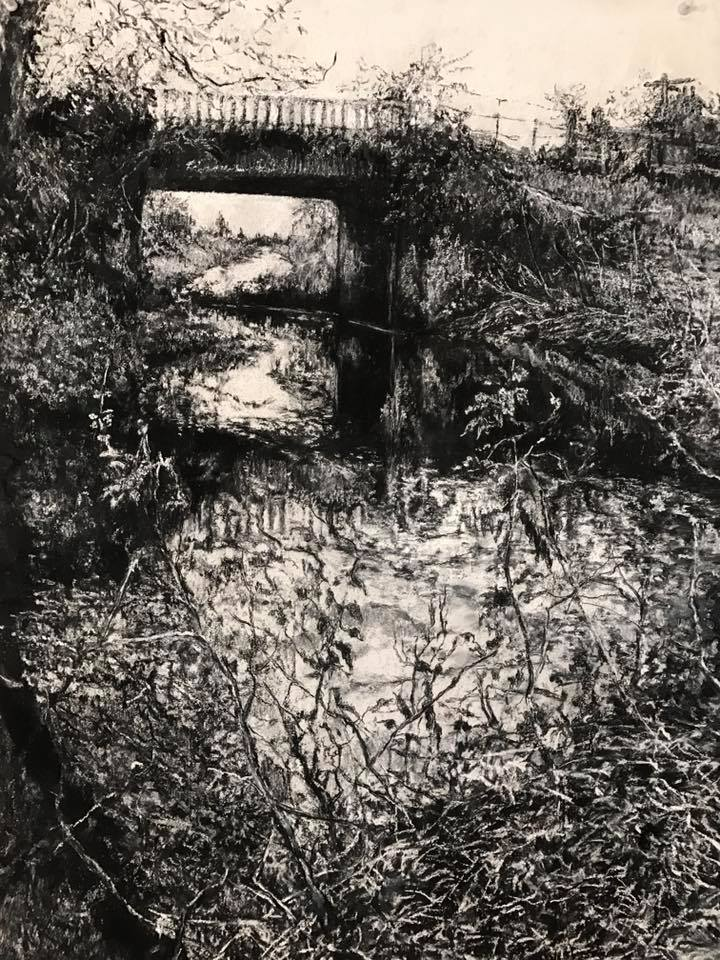
Judith Tucker, 2017, Charcoal, varnish and white pigment on arches paper. 76 x 56 cm

Judith Tucker (1960 – 13 November 2023) was a British artist and academic. She completed a BA in Fine Arts at the Ruskin School of Art, St Anne's College, Oxford, (1978–81) an MA in Fine Arts (1997–98) and a PhD in Fine Arts at the University of Leeds (1999–2002). Tucker is co-convenor of LAND2, a research network of artists associated with higher education who are concerned with radical approaches to landscape with a particular focus on memory, place and identity. She exhibits regularly in the UK and Europe. Between 2003 and 2006, Tucker was an Arts and Humanities Research Council (AHRC) Research Fellow in the Creative and Performing Arts.

Of her work she said “My practice explores the meeting of social history, personal memory and landscapes; it investigates their relationship through drawing, painting and scholarly writing.” Paintings and drawings by Tucker have been exhibited in ‘Landscape During Times of Uncertainty’ at Southampton City Art Gallery (2015), ‘Drawn 2013’, Royal West of England Academy (2013), ‘Shadows Traces Undercurrents’ Katherine E. Nash Gallery, Regis Centre for Art, Minneapolis, USA, (2012), ‘Arts and Geographies’, Musée des Moulages, Lyon, France, (2013) and ‘Postmemorial Landscapes’, Armory Gallery, Blacksburg, Virginia, USA. Her work has been acquired by the New Hall Collection of Women's Art, Cambridge, New College, Oxford, the Priseman Seabrook Collection, St Matthias Kolleg, Germany and Swindon Museum and Art Gallery in the UK.

Tucker died in a traffic collision on 13 November 2023, at the age of 63.

== Selected group exhibitions ==
- Selected for Yantai Landscape Biennale, China^{[date?]}
- More In Common, Arts in Perpertuity Trust, London (2018)
- Getting Away, Arthouse1, London and Quay Arts, Isle of Wight (2018)
- Finalist in the Jackson's Open Painting Prize (2018)
- Outfalls, Groundwork Gallery, Gallery for Art and the Environment (2018)
- Contemporary Masters from Britain: 80 British Painters of the 21st Century Yantai Art Museum, Artall Gallery, Nanjing, Jiangsu Art Gallery, Nanjing and the Tianjin Academy of Fine Art, Tianjin. China (2017)
- Anything Goes? Contemporary British Painting: An Exhibition of Works by Members of Contemporary British Painting selected by Anna McNay, Bermondsey Art Project Space, London (2017)
- In the Open, Sheffield, SIA Art Space and Bank Street Arts, Sheffield, Curator and exhibitor (2017)
- Neverends: art, text and music in place at Muriel Barker Gallery, Fishing Heritage Centre, Grimsby culmination of 18 month Arts Council funded commission (2017)
- Contemporary British Painting Winter Exhibition, Marylebone, London (2016)
- An intervention to accompany “Wildness without Wilderness”: The Poiesis of Energy and Instability The European Association for the Study of Literature, Culture and Environment Université Libre de Bruxelles
- Projectfitties Discovery Centre, Cleethorpes, (2016)
- Summer Exhibition of Contemporary British Painting, Quay Arts, Newport Isle of Wight (2016)
- Seeing Double: residency and exhibition of open-form poems by Harriet Tarlo and monochrome drawings by Judith Tucker, The Aldeburgh Beach Lookout Tower (2015)
- ‘‘Landscape During Times of Uncertainty” Southampton City Art Gallery (2013)
- ‘‘Estuaries and Excavations” Abbey Walk Gallery, Lincolnshire (2013)
- ‘‘Drawn 2013” Royal West of England Academy, Bristol (2013)
- ‘‘Jewish Artists in Yorkshire” Stanley and Audrey Burton Gallery, Leeds (2013)
- ‘‘Art and Geography” Musée des Moulages, Lyon, France (2013)
- ‘‘Shadows Traces Undercurrents, Katherine E. Nash Gallery, Regis Centre for Art Minneapolis USA (2012)
- ‘‘Space, Place and Spectral Trace” BV Gallery Bristol (2011)
- ‘‘All Over the Place: Drawing Place, Drawing Space” Stanley and Audrey Burton Gallery, University of Leeds (2010)
- ‘‘Revisiting the Beach” Exlibris Gallery, Fine Art Department, Newcastle University (2009)
- ‘‘Painting Lives” Mercer Gallery, Harrogate (2006)

== Selected solo exhibitions ==
- ‘‘Low Lying: painting and poetry from the saltmarsh, Judith Tucker and Harriet Tarlo” Westminster Reference Library, London (2019)
- ‘‘Judith Tucker: Paintings” The Crypt, St Marylebone Parish Church, London (2015)
- ‘‘Vestige" Abbey Walk Gallery, North Lincolnshire (2012)
- ‘‘Judith Tucker: Paintings” Katakomby Gallery, Brno, Czech Republic (2011)
- ‘‘Spectres on the Beach" F Block Gallery, UWE, Bristol (2011)
- ‘‘Postmemorial Landscapes” Armory Gallery, Blacksburg, Virginia, USA (2010)
- ‘‘Tense” Myles Meehan Arts Centre Darlington (2008)
- ‘‘Resort viii” Institute of Interdisciplinary Art, University of Bath (2007)
- ‘‘Resort vii” Solo exhibition in the New Hall Art Collection, University of Cambridge (2006)
- ‘‘Resort vi” 20-21 Visual Arts Centre, North Lincolnshire (2006)
- ‘‘Resort vi” University of Leeds Gallery (2006)
- ‘‘Resort iv” Gainsborough's House, Suffolk (2005)
- ‘‘Resort iii” Gallery 33, Swan Street, London (2005)
- ‘‘Resort ii” Gallery Oldham (2004)
- ‘‘Resort” Only Atelier, Argentinier Strasse, Vienna (2003)
- ‘‘Judith Tucker” Oriel Plas Glyn-y Weddw Gallery, Gwynnedd, Wales (2003)
- ‘‘Caesura” Dean Clough, Halifax (2002)
- ‘‘Shift” The Mary Ogilvie Gallery, St. Anne’s College, Oxford (1999)
- ‘‘Crossing Two Lands” St Matthias Kolleg, Tunsdorf, Germany (1997)

== Selected collections ==
- New Hall Art Collection, Cambridge, UK
- Swindon Museum and Art Gallery, UK
- Paintings in Hospitals, UK
- New College, University of Oxford, UK
- The Priseman Seabrook Collection, UK
- St Matthias Kolleg, Germany
- Grimsby Fishing Heritage Centre, UK

== Selected publications ==
- (2018/19) Walking Backwards: art between places in twenty-first century Britain, in Walking: Landscape and Environment ed David Borthwick, Taylor and Francis (forthcoming)
- (2017) Tucker JA and Tarlo HAB, ‘Drawing closer’: an ecocritical consideration of collaborative, cross-disciplinary practices of walking, writing, drawing and exhibiting, in Extending Ecocriticism: crisis, collaboration and challenges in the environmental humanities; eds Welstead and Barry, MUP (forthcoming)
- (2017) Tucker JA and Tarlo HAB, “Off path, counter path”: contemporary collaborations in landscape, art and poetry” Critical Survey, Berghan, pp. 105–132
- (2012) Tucker J, Brooding on Bornholm: postmemory, painting and place, in Jones O. and Garde-Hanse, . (eds) Geography and Memory: Explorations in Identity, Place and Becoming, Springer
- (2011) Tucker J, On the Beach at Bornholm, Journal of Visual Art Practice
- (2010) Tucker J, The Lido in the Forest: Painting, Memory and Subjectivity, in Memory, Mourning and Landscape: Interdisciplinary Essays, eds E Anderson, A Maddrell, K McLoughlin and A Vincent, Rodopi Press, Amsterdam
- (2009) Tucker J, Belated Landscapes: A Second-Generation Aesthetic Practice in a British Context, Journal for the Study of British Cultures (JSBC)
- (2008) Tucker J, ‘Resort: re/visiting, re/visioning, re/placing’, Journal of Visual Art Practice 5(1): 95–106, doi: 10.1386/jvap.5.1.95/1
- (2007) Tucker J, Painting Landscape: Mediating Dislocation, in Culture, Creativity and Environment: new environmentalist criticism, eds F Becket and T Gifford, Rodopi Press, Amsterdam
- (2007) Tucker J, Painting Places: A Postmemorial ‘Landscape’? In Migratory Aesthetics, eds S Durrant and C Lord, Rodopi Press, Amsterdam

== Awards ==
- (2012–2017) Arts Council-funded commissions with the poet Harriet Tarlo
- (2003–2006) AHRC Research Fellowship in the Creative and Performing Arts
- (2002–2003) Yorkshire Arts research and development grant
- (2001–2002) University of Leeds research and exhibiting bursary
- (1999–2000) University of Leeds research bursary for PhD study
