= Castlefield Gallery =

Art gallery in Manchester, England

Coordinates: 53.474065°N 2.251455°W

The Castlefield Gallery is an art gallery in Manchester, England, located at 2 Hewitt Street, Knott Mill, Manchester. The gallery, a resource for contemporary visual artists, was founded by Manchester Artists Studio Association in 1984. The gallery has an exhibition and events programme, provides a professional development scheme for artists in its Project Space.
