= Contemporary British Painting =

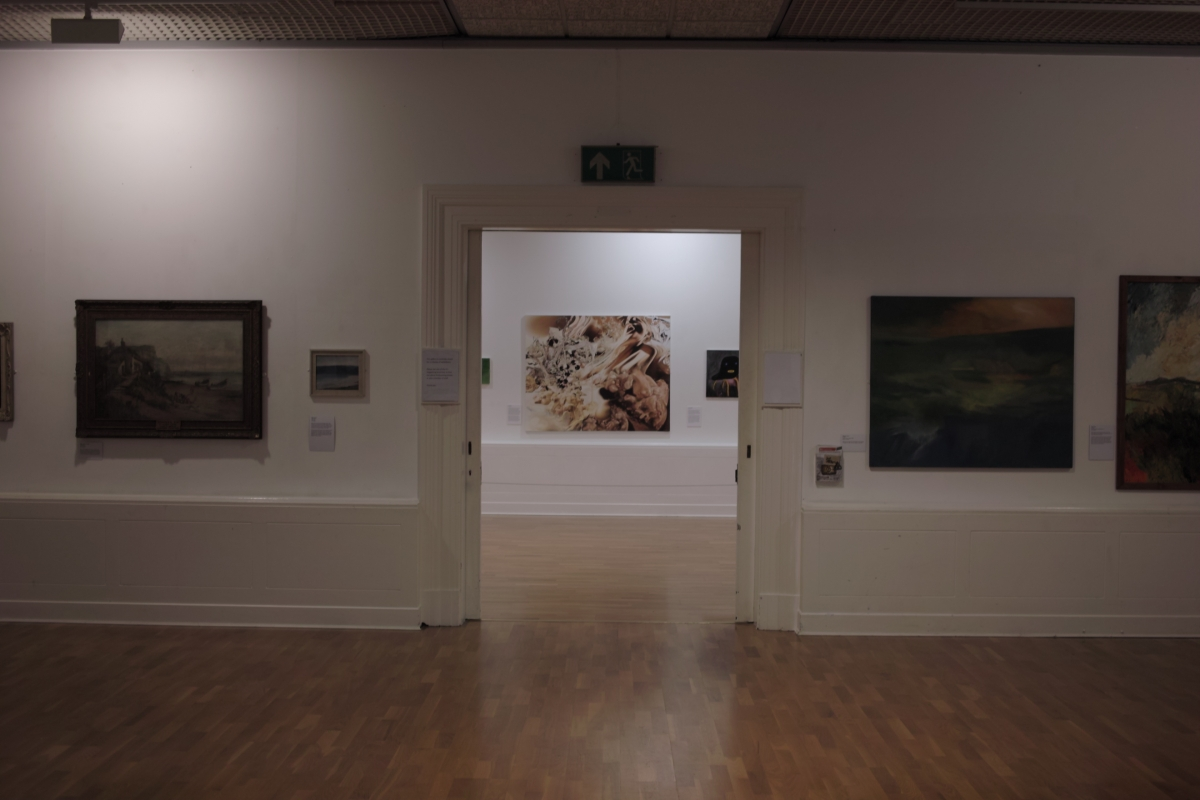
- Installation photograph of the exhibition 'Contemporary British Painting' at Huddersfield Art Gallery, 2014
- Established: 2013
- Founders: Robert Priseman and Simon Carter
- Location: United Kingdom
- Website: Contemporary British Painting

Contemporary British Painting is an artists' collective of over 90 members, founded in 2013 by Robert Priseman with the assistance of Simon Carter. It is a platform for contemporary painting in the UK "seeking to explore and promote critical context and dialogue in current painting practice through a series of solo and group exhibitions; talks, publications and an art prize".

== History ==
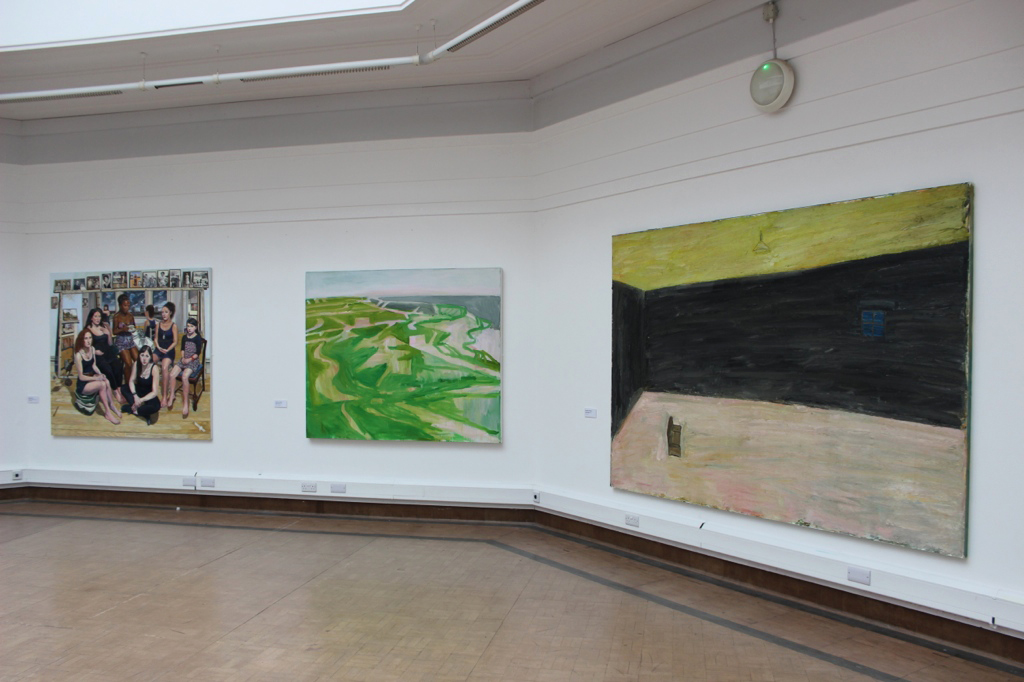
Installation photograph of the exhibition '@paintbritain' at Ipswich Art School Gallery, Ipswich Museum, 2014

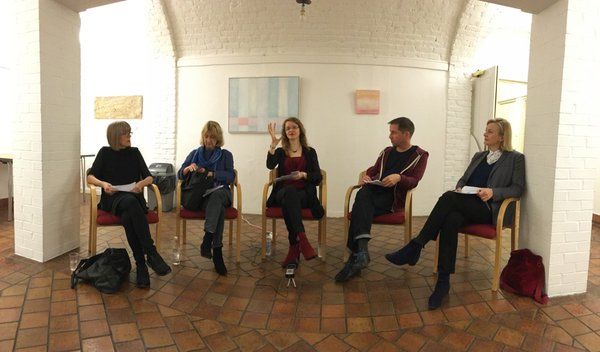
Panel discussion for the exhibition, Lines for Agnes'. London 2015

In 2013 British artist and curator Robert Priseman developed a series of solo painting exhibitions for the Crypt in St Marylebone Parish Church in collaboration with The Revd Canon Stephen Evans (Rector of St Marylebone) and artist Simon Carter. The aim of the project was to explore themes from the perspective of practicing painters which held a particular 21st century resonance. Following the initial programme of solo exhibitions at the crypt a group drawn from the exhibited painters formed an advisory board. Out of this, a series of group exhibitions was developed along with a series of talks, reading groups and the donation of paintings by members of the group to art collections, galleries and museums in the UK and around the world.

In 2014 ‘Contemporary British Painting’ launched ‘Painting of the Day’, a platform for artists to submit images of their paintings, with those selected being featured on the groups social media platforms in ‘Painting of the day’ at 11.00am each day. This was followed in 2015 by the development of a monthly ‘Reading Group’ for painters in collaboration with Westminster Art Library and The Minories, Colchester and a painting prize which was launched in 2016.

Robert Priseman decided to move on to other projects in 2019. Under successive chairs CBP adopted a constitution, became a limited company by guarantee, continued to develop exhibitions across the UK and internationally, and broadened its membership to reflect the diversity of contemporary painting practice across the United Kingdom. It established connections with galleries and in 2026 launched an annual thematic focus to its exhibitions and talks programme. Major group exhibitions included 'X, Contemporary British Painting' at Newcastle Contemporary Art in 2023.

== The Contemporary British Painting Prize ==
‘The Contemporary British Painting Prize’, was launched in 2016 and is open to artists of any age and nationality living and working in the UK. From 2024 the prize became biennial. The winner receives £8,000, a catalogue essay, an invitation to join Contemporary British Painting and a selector position for the next prize. Recent exhibitions of the shortlisted artists have been held at Thames-Side Studios, London, Bay Arts Gallery, Cardiff, Yorkshire Arts Space, Sheffield, and Huddersfield Art Gallery. Past judges include Louisa Buck, Hettie Judah, Paul Hedges, Martyn Cross and Matthew Collings.

== The Judith Tucker Memorial Prize ==
A memorial fund was established in 2024 after the death of Judith Tucker, the chair of Contemporary British Painting. The Memorial Prize was formed in association with Contemporary British Painting. Two biennial prizes of £3000 and £1,500 are awarded to women artists working in the UK whose practices explore the relation between memory, place, environment and landscape. The first prizes were awarded in 2024. Lubaina Himid, Dr. Griselda Pollock and Professor Harriet Tarlo were judges.

== The YAS Exhibition Award ==
In 2027 an artist will be selected from the 2026 CBP Painting Prize by the Director of Yorkshire ArtSpace for a curated solo exhibition at the gallery.

== Selected group exhibitions ==
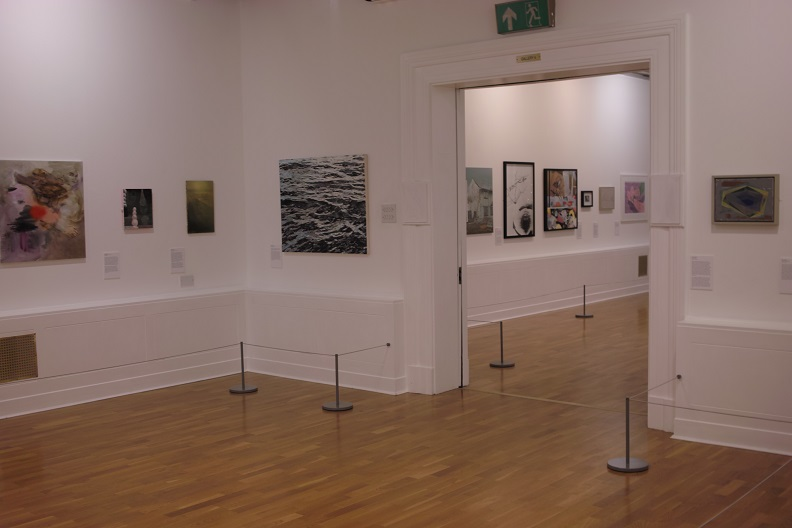
Installation photograph of the exhibition 'Contemporary British Painting' at Huddersfield Art Gallery, 2014

- (2017) Anything Goes? Art Bermondsey Project Space, London
- (2016) Contemporary British Painting: Summer Show, The Quay Arts, Isle of Wight, UK
- (2016) Slippery and Amorphous, The Crypt, St Marylebone Parish Church, London
- (2015) Lines for Agnes, The Crypt, St Marylebone Parish Church, London
- (2015) Brentwood Stations of the Cross, Brentwood Cathedral, Essex, UK
- (2014) Contemporary British Painting, Huddersfield Art Gallery, Huddersfield, UK
- (2014) @paintbritian, Ipswich Art School Galleries, Ipswich Museum, Ipswich, UK

== Members ==
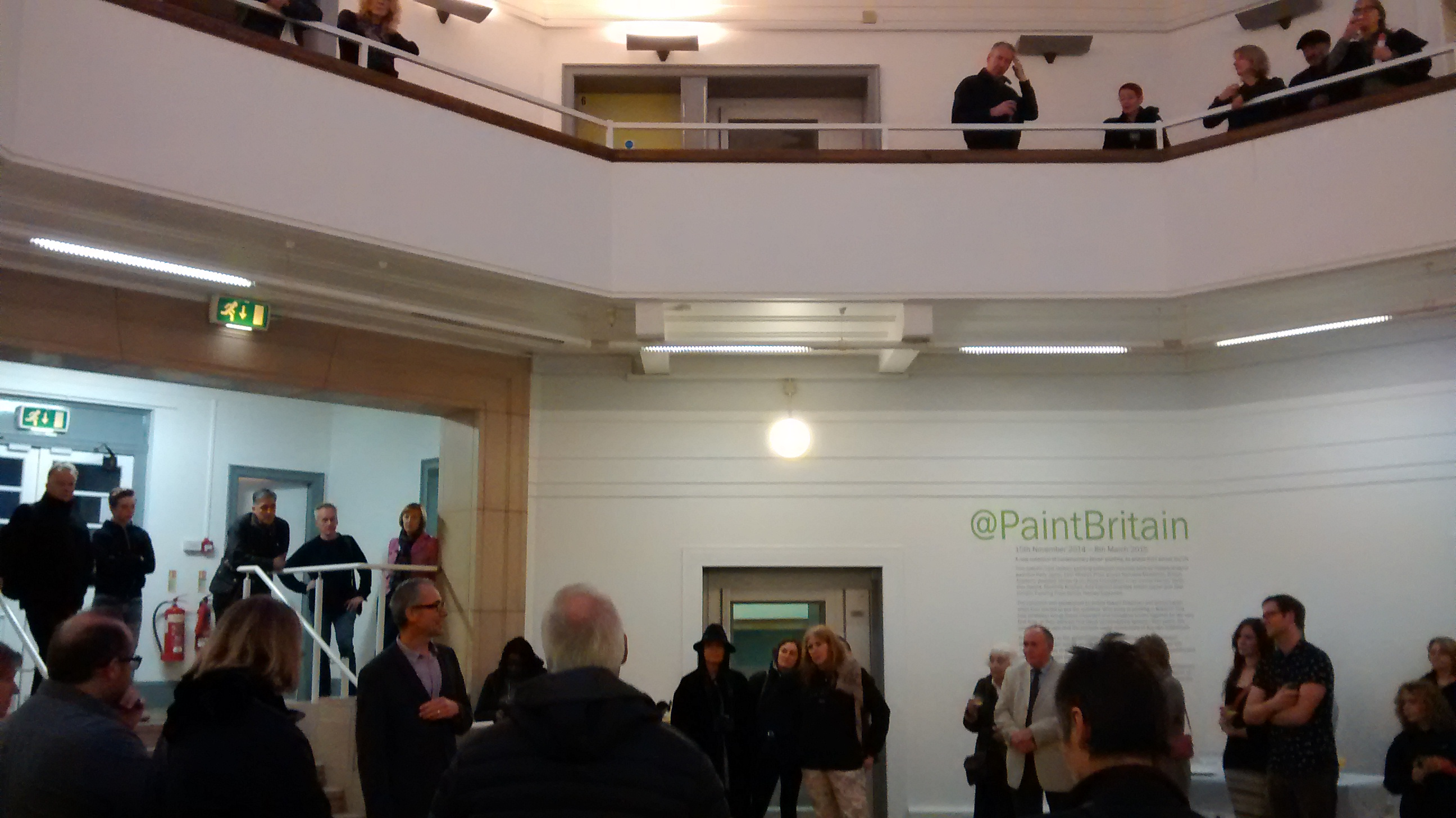
Installation photograph of the exhibition '@paintbritain' at Ipswich Art School Gallery, Ipswich Museum, 2014. Artist Simon Carter gives an introductory speech.

A list of current members with statements and images is placed on the Contemporary British Painting website.

== Selected publications ==
- Carter, Simon (2015). The Brentwood Stations of the Cross. ISBN 9781505832068.
- Carter, Simon. (2014) @paintbritain: 45 Contemporary Painters. ISBN 9781503342156
- Contemporary British Painting Prize 2021. ISBN 978-1-7397818-0-4
- Contemporary British Painting Prize 2022. ISBN 978-1-7397818-2-8
- Contemporary British Painting Prize 2023. ISBN 978-1-7397818-4-2
- Contemporary British Painting Prize 2024. ISBN 978-1-7397818-5-9
- Paradoxes. ISBN 978-1-7397818-1-1
- Priseman. Robert. (2017) Contemporary Masters from Britain. ISBN 978-1543281620
- Priseman. Robert, Cummings. S., and O'Kane. P. (2015) Documentary Realism: Painting in the Digital Age. ISBN 978-1507664261
- Purdue. F. (2016) Contemporary British Painting Summer Exhibition 2016. ISBN 978-1534870123
- 'X' 10th Anniversary Catalogue. ISBN 978-1-7397818-3-5
