= Jiangsu Art Gallery =

Art museum in Nanjing, China

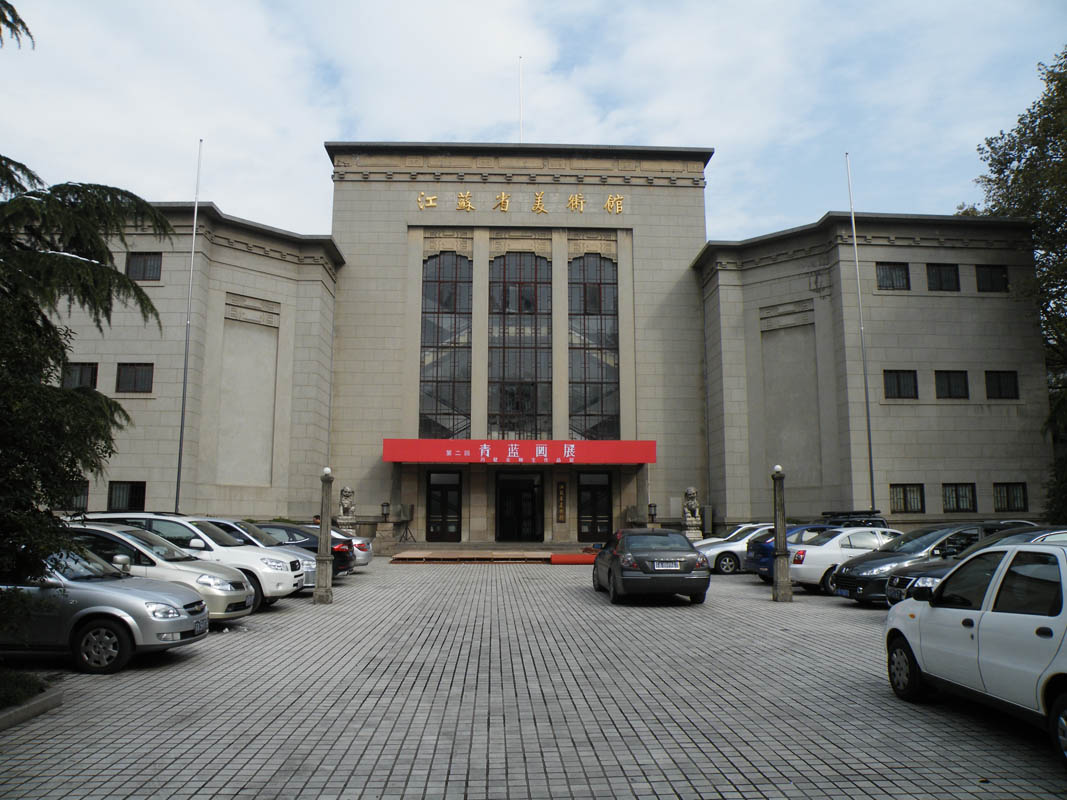
Jiangsu Art Gallery

Jiangsu Art Gallery, also known as Jiangsu Provincial Art Museum (Chinese: 江苏省美术馆), is a museum in Nanjing, in Jiangsu province in China. It was founded in 1936, during the Nanjing decade, as China's first state level museum. In 1960, it was formally renamed the Jiangsu Provincial Art Museum. In 2010 it re-opened in a new 27,449-square-metre (295,460 sq ft) building designed by the German architect studio KSP Jürgen Engel Architekten.

The museum hosts the Nanjing biennale.

The gallery is the largest in the Jiangsu Province, presenting traditional and contemporary art pieces of China.

== Transportation ==
The building is accessible within walking distance east of Daxinggong Station of Nanjing Metro.

== See also ==
- List of tourist attractions in China
- Nanjing Great Hall of the People
- H.H. Kung
