= Hannay =

Hannay may refer to:

- Clan Hannay, a Lowland Scottish clan
  - Hannay baronets, including a list of people who have held the title
- Richard Hannay, a fictional character in novels, films, television and on the stage
  - Hannay (TV series), British television series about Richard Hannay

== People with the surname ==
- Alastair Hannay (1932–2024), British-born Norwegian philosopher and academic
- Barbara Hannay, Australian romance novelist
- David Hannay (historian) (1853–1934), English naval historian
- David Hannay, Baron Hannay of Chiswick (born 1935), British diplomat
- David Hannay (producer) (1939-2014), Australian film producer
- James Hannay (writer) (1827–1873), Scottish novelist, journalist and diplomat
- James Ballantyne Hannay (1855–1931), Scottish chemist
- Josh Hannay (born 1980), Australian rugby league footballer
- Nathan Hannay (born 1984), English rugby player
- Robert Kerr Hannay (1867-1940), Scottish historian
- Sir Samuel Hannay, 3rd Baronet (died 1790), of the Hannay baronets, MP for Camelford
- Thomas Hannay (1887-1970), British Anglican bishop
- William Hannay (1848-1922), New Zealand public servant, railways administrator

== See also ==
- Hanny, a given name, nickname and surname
