= St Marylebone Parish Church =

Church in London, England

Coordinates: 51°31′21″N 0°09′08″W

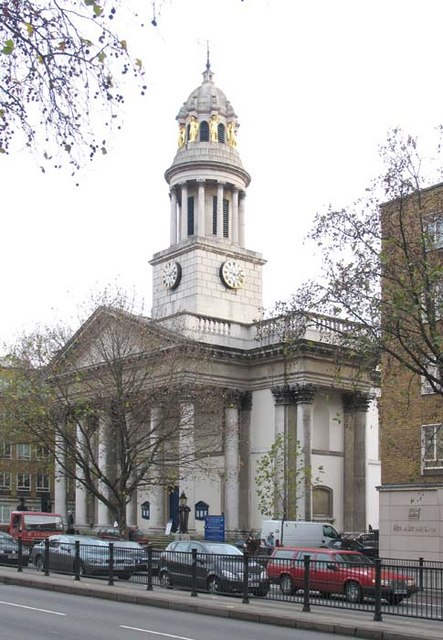
- St Marylebone Parish Church
- OS grid reference: TQ 28285 82034
- Location: 19 Marylebone Road; London NW1 5LT
- Country: England
- Denomination: Church of England
- Website: www.stmarylebone.org

History
- Status: Parish church

Architecture
- Functional status: Active
- Heritage designation: Grade I listed
- Architect: Thomas Hardwick

Administration
- Diocese: Diocese of London
- Archdeaconry: Charing Cross

Clergy
- Rector: The Revd Canon Dr Stephen Evans

St Marylebone Parish Church is an Anglican church on the Marylebone Road in London. It was built to the designs of Thomas Hardwick in 1813–17. The present site is the third used by the parish for its church. The first was further south, near Oxford Street. The church there was demolished in 1400 and a new one erected further north. This was completely rebuilt in 1740–42, and converted into a chapel-of-ease when Hardwick's church was constructed. The Marylebone area takes its name from the church. Located behind the church is St Marylebone School, a Church of England school for girls.

== Previous churches ==
=== First church ===
The first church for the parish was built in the vicinity of the present Marble Arch c. 1200, and dedicated to St John the Evangelist.

=== Second church ===
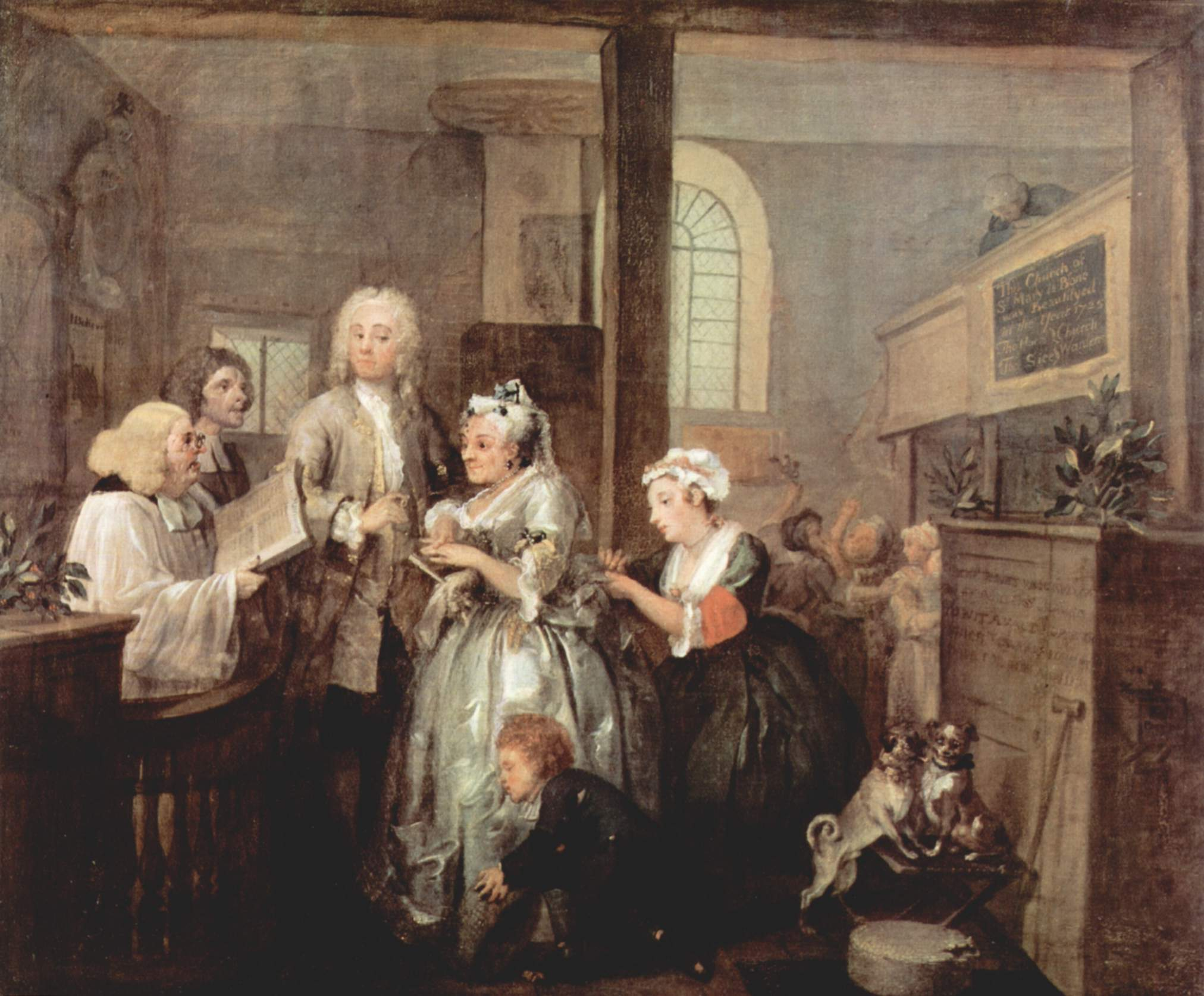
The marriage scene from A Rake's Progress by William Hogarth, showing the interior of the second St Marylebone church. Sir John Soane's Museum, London

In 1400 the Bishop of London gave the parishioners permission to demolish the church of St John and build a new one in a more convenient position, near a recently completed chapel, which could be used until the new church was completed. The bishop stipulated that the old churchyard should be preserved, but also gave permission to enclose a new burial ground at the new site, The church was dedicated to the Virgin Mary. It was closer to the village, at the north end of Marylebone High Street. Having fallen into a state of decay, it was demolished in 1740.

It was in this church Francis Bacon was married in 1606, and its interior was portrayed by William Hogarth in the marriage scene from his famous series "A Rake's Progress" (1735). By 1722, its congregation was so large it needed a chapel of ease in the form of the Marybone Chapel, now St Peter, Vere Street.

=== Third church ===
A new, smaller, church built on the same site opened in April 1742. It was an oblong brick building with a small bell tower at the west end. The interior had galleries on three sides. Some monuments from the previous church were preserved in the new building. In 1818 it became a chapel-of-ease to the new parish church which superseded it. It was demolished in 1949, and its site, at the northern end of Marylebone High Street is now a public garden.

Charles Wesley lived and worked in the area and sent for the church's rector John Harley and told him "Sir, whatever the world may say of me, I have lived, and I die, a member of the Church of England. I pray you to bury me in your churchyard." On his death, his body was carried to the church by eight clergymen of the Church of England and a memorial stone to him stands in the gardens in High Street, close to his burial spot. One of his sons, Samuel, was later organist of the present church.

It was also in this building that Lord Byron was baptised in 1788. Admiral Horatio Nelson was a worshipper here and his daughter Horatia was baptised here; Richard Brinsley Sheridan was married to Elizabeth Ann Linley here. This is also the church in which the diplomat Sir William Hamilton married Emma Hart (Amy Lyon), later Nelson's lover. The architect James Gibbs was buried there in 1751. The crypt was the burial place of members of the Bentinck family, including William Cavendish-Bentinck, 3rd Duke of Portland (died 1809).

== The present church ==
=== Original design ===
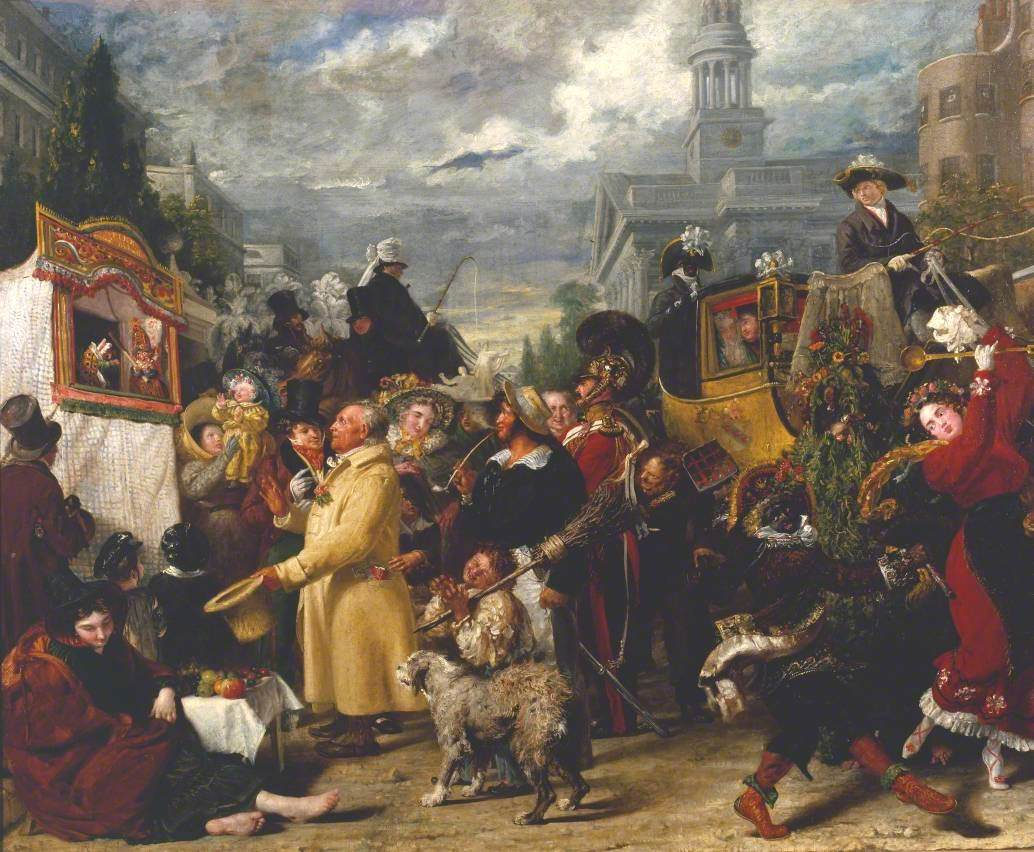
The church (background, right) depicted in the 1829 painting Punch or May Day by Benjamin Robert Haydon.

Construction of a new church was first considered in 1770, with plans prepared by Sir William Chambers and leadership given by the 3rd and 4th Dukes of Portland (owners of much of the area, by now a wealthy residential area to the west of London that had outgrown the previous church), but the scheme was abandoned and the land donated for it in Paddington Street purchased for a burial ground.

In 1810–11 a site was secured to build a chapel-of-ease on the south side of the new road near Nottingham Place. facing Regent's Park. Plans were drawn up by Chambers's pupil Thomas Hardwick and the foundation stone was laid on 5 July 1813. When construction was almost complete, it was decided that this new building should serve as the parish church, and so alterations were made to the design. On the north front, towards the new road, a Corinthian portico with eight columns (six columns wide, and two deep at the sides), based on that of the Pantheon in Rome, replaced the intended four-column Ionic portico surmounted by a group of figures. A steeple was built, instead of a planned cupola. No changes were made to the design of the interior, but plans to build houses on part of the site were abandoned. The church was completed in 1817, at an overall cost of £80,000.

Entrance to the church from the north is through three doorways beneath the portico, each leading into a vestibule. There are arched windows above the outer doorways. A blank panel above the central one was intended to house a bas-relief depicting Christ's entry into Jerusalem. Hardwick's church was basically rectangular in plan, with two small extensions behind the entrance front, and two wings placed diagonally flanking the far end (the liturgical east), which originally housed private galleries equipped with chairs, tables and fireplaces. Two tiers of galleries, supported on iron columns ran around three sides of the church. The organ case was immediately above the altar screen; in the centre of the organ case was an arched opening with a "transparent painting" by Benjamin West, of the angel appearing to the shepherds. Other church furniture included a large pulpit and reading desk and high box pews.

The steeple, placed over the central vestibule, rises around 75 feet (23 m) above the roof (and thus about 120 feet (37 m) above the ground). It is in three storeys. The first, square in plan, contains a clock. The second, circular in plan, has twelve Corinthian columns supporting an entablature. The third is in the form of a miniature temple raised on three steps and surrounded by eight caryatids, with arched openings between them. The whole structure is topped by a dome and weathervane.

A vaulted crypt extends under the whole church, with extensive catacombs under the west side. It was used for burials until being bricked up in 1853. Since 1987, following the reinterment of the 850 coffins previously contained at Brookwood Cemetery in Surrey, the vault has housed a healing and counselling centre.

A local resident was Charles Dickens (1812–1870), in Devonshire Terrace, whose son was baptised in this church (a ceremony fictionalised in Dombey and Son). Robert Browning and Elizabeth Barrett were married in this phase of the church in 1846 (their marriage certificate is preserved in the church archives). The church was also used in location filming for the 1957 film recounting their story, The Barretts of Wimpole Street.

Composer Sir John Stainer wrote an oratorio specifically for the choir at St Marylebone; The Crucifixion was first performed in the church on 24 February 1887, which was the day after Ash Wednesday. It has been performed annually at the church ever since, usually on Good Friday.

=== Later alterations ===
In 1826, the transparency above the altar was removed, the organ case reduced in size and the private galleries replaced by new ones for pupils of the National School.

In 1882 the energetic new rector, the Rev. William Barker led the parish council to extensively redevelop the church, to (in Barker's words) "bring it more into harmony with the arrangements and decorations suited to the religious demands of the present day". The new plans, by Thomas Harris (architect and churchwarden of the parish), removed the end wall and the upper galleries along the sides of the church (uncovering the windows' full length and letting in more light), created a chancel for a robed choir (with new carved mahogany choir stalls with angel ends) and a sanctuary within the new apse, and added a marble mosaic floor, a fine marble pulpit and two balustrades (with Alpha and Omega on the latter). This new scheme combined Neo-Classicism with Pre-Raphaelitism, and included a gilded cross in the ceiling above the site of the original altar. Funded by subscription, it began in 1884 (with a memorial stone, laid by Catherine Gladstone, wife of William Ewart Gladstone, the Prime Minister, in the outside wall of the apse) and was completed a year later.

=== Post-war ===
A bomb fell in the churchyard close by during the Second World War, blowing out all the windows, piercing the ceiling over the reredos in two places with pieces of iron railing from the school playground, and necessitating the church's closure for repairs until 1949, when fragments of the original coloured glass were incorporated into the new windows and a Browning Chapel created at the back of the church to commemorate the Brownings' marriage. This chapel later became a parish room known as the Browning Room, with the chapel transferred to the side of the church as the Holy Family Chapel. This room contained several items of Browning furniture which have since largely been stolen.

The churchyard is now a Garden of Rest in the care of the City of Westminster.

== Rectors of St Marylebone ==
The church provides a list of ministers of the parish since 1544. (It additionally notes that William Witham is given on Wikipedia as incumbent of St Marylebone until 1454, but states that he was in fact incumbent of St Mary-le-Bow.)

In 1821 the parish Rectory, impropriated by the Dukes of Portland for the previous century, was restored to the incumbent clergyman (then Luke Heslop, incumbent since 1810). Heslop thus became Rector of St Marylebone.

- 1821–1825† Luke Heslop (as Archdeacon of Buckingham)
- 1825–1854† John Hume Spry
- 1855–1857 John Pelham (later Bishop of Norwich)
- 1857–1882 Charles Eyre
- 1882–1908 William Barker (later Dean of Carlisle)
- 1908–1942 William Douglas Morrison (criminologist)
- 1942–1954 Hubert Matthews (as Archdeacon of Hampstead from 1950)
- 1954–1958† James Harington Evans
- 1958–1978† Frank Coventry
- 1979–1990 Christopher Hamel Cooke
- 1990–1997 John Chater
- 1997–2010 Christopher Gower
- 2010– Stephen Evans

† Rector died in post

== Organ ==
The church contains a four manual organ by Rieger Orgelbau. A specification of the organ can be found on the National Pipe Organ Register.

=== Organists ===
- 1817–1834 – Samuel Wesley, son of Charles and Sarah Wesley
- ????-???? – William Hodge, John Stainer dedicated his Crucifixion to him
- ????-1913 – Frederick B. Kiddle, prominent English pianist, organist and accompanist
- 1965–1971 – Douglas Edward Hopkins, (formerly organist of Canterbury Cathedral)
- 1971–1979 – Michael Howard, English choral conductor, organist and composer
- 1979–1991 – Catherine Ennis
- 1991–2001 – Peter Barley (afterwards organist of St. Patrick's Cathedral, Dublin)
- 2001–2014 – Steven Grahl (afterwards Organist and Master of the Choristers at Peterborough Cathedral)
- 2014–present – Gavin Roberts

== Notable burials ==
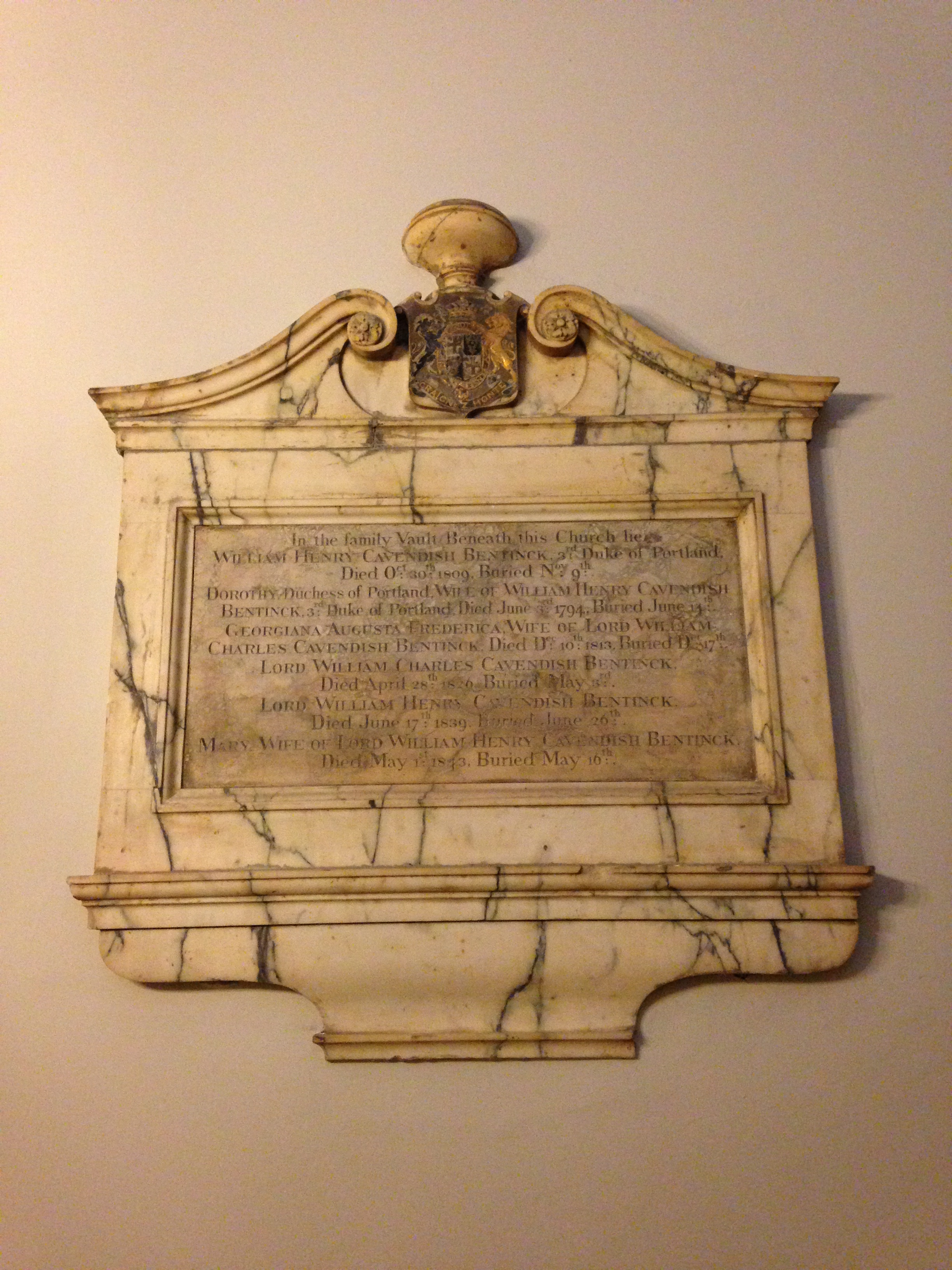
Memorial to the 3rd Duke of Portland at the family vault in St Marylebone Parish Church

Members of the Bentinck family, including

- William Cavendish-Bentinck, 3rd Duke of Portland (1738–1809), Prime Minister of the United Kingdom
- Dorothy Cavendish-Bentinck, Duchess of Portland (1750–1794; née Lady Dorothy Cavendish)
- Lieutenant-General Lord William Cavendish-Bentinck (1774–1839), Governor-General of India

Listed below are some of the burials in the churchyard, which no longer exists because it has been made into a public garden.

- Archibald Bower (1686–1766), Scottish historian
- Richard Cosway (1742–1821), portrait painter
- Francis Perceval Eliot (1755–1818), soldier and man of letters
- Grace Montagu Cosby (1686–1767), wife of William Cosby
- James Figg (died 1734), pugilist
- Barak Longmate (1738–1793), genealogist, editor, heraldic engraver and publisher
- John Shore (1751–1834), First Lord Teignmouth, Governor General of India from 1792 to 1798
- John Vanderbank (1694–1739), portrait painter and book illustrator
- Caroline Watson (1761?–1814), engraver
- The Reverend Charles Wesley (1707–1788), leader of the Methodist movement, most widely known for writing more than 6,000 hymns; also his wife, Sarah.
- Joseph Woelfl (1773–1812), composer and pianist.
- Sir Barry Close (1756–1813), army general, baronet.

== Contemporary British Painting ==
In 2013 the church began a series of exhibitions in the crypt featuring living British painters in collaboration with the artists led group Contemporary British Painting. Artists exhibited in the programme include Matthew Krishanu, Claudia Böse, Mary Webb, Susan Gunn, Nicholas Middleton, Simon Burton, Alex Hanna, Pen Dalton, Simon Carter, Judith Tucker, Susie Hamilton, Julie Umerle, Greg Rook, Stephen Newton, Alison Pilkington, Marguerite Horner, Paula MacArthur, Nathan Eastwood, Linda Ingham, James Quin, Wendy Saunders and Robert Priseman.

== Funding from Sackler family ==
The Church has, in the past, received a donation from the Sackler family, a billionaire American family accused of contributing to the opioid crisis through the drug OxyContin. The church received a £250,000 donation from the Sackler Trust in 2020.

== Sources ==
- Church's homepage
