= Falmouth Art Gallery =

Coordinates: 50.1557°N 5.0724°W

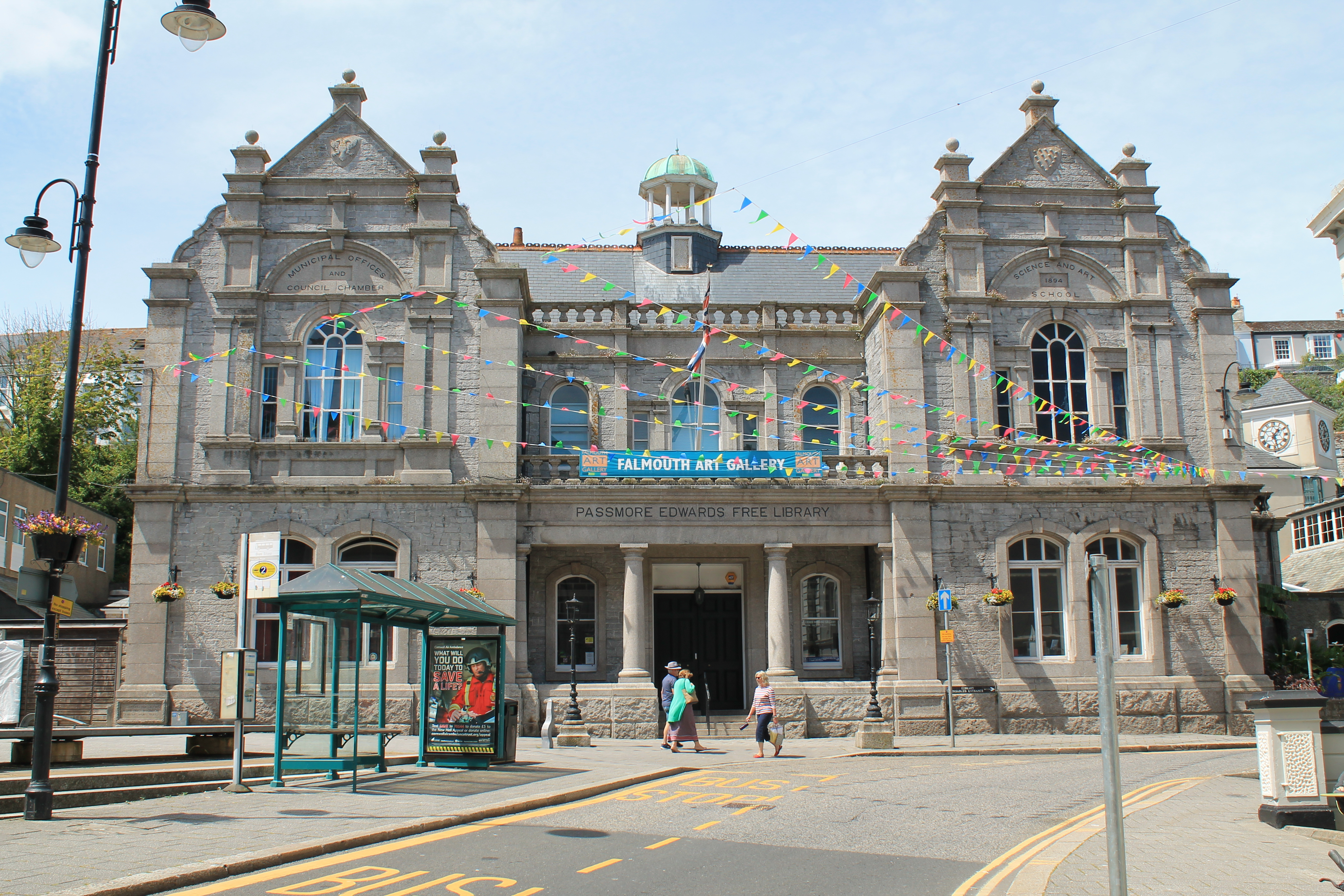
- The Municipal Buildings in Falmouth (the gallery is on the upper floor)
- Established: 10 October 1978; 47 years ago
- Location: The Moor, Municipal Buildings, Falmouth, Cornwall
- Type: Publicly funded art museum
- Parking: Town Quarry car park
- Website: www.falmouthartgallery.com

Falmouth Art Gallery is a publicly funded art gallery in Cornwall, with one of the leading art collections in Cornwall and southwest England, which features work by old masters, major Victorian artists, British and French Impressionists, leading surrealists and maritime artists, children's book illustrators, automata, contemporary painters and printmakers. It is located on The Moor, on the upper floor of the Municipal Buildings above the Library in Falmouth, Cornwall.

== History ==
Falmouth Art Gallery in its present form opened on the upper floor of the Municipal Buildings on 12 October 1978 and was renovated with grant aid from the Heritage Lottery Fund and other funding bodies, before being re-opened by Sir Tim Rice on 31 May 1996. Falmouth Art Gallery is a service funded by Falmouth Town Council and is a nationally accredited museum and complies with standards laid down for the Registration of Museums in the United Kingdom.

The core of the town's art collection dates from 1923, with gifts made by Alfred de Pass (1861–1952), a South African businessman and art benefactor. This has encouraged other major donations, most notably from Richard Harris, Robert Priseman, Grace Gardner, and Sue and Ron Astles. The gallery has also benefited from purchases made through grant funding from organisations such as The Art Fund, the Heritage Lottery Fund, MLA/V&A Purchase Grant Fund, and the Nerys Johnson Contemporary Art Fund.

== The collection ==
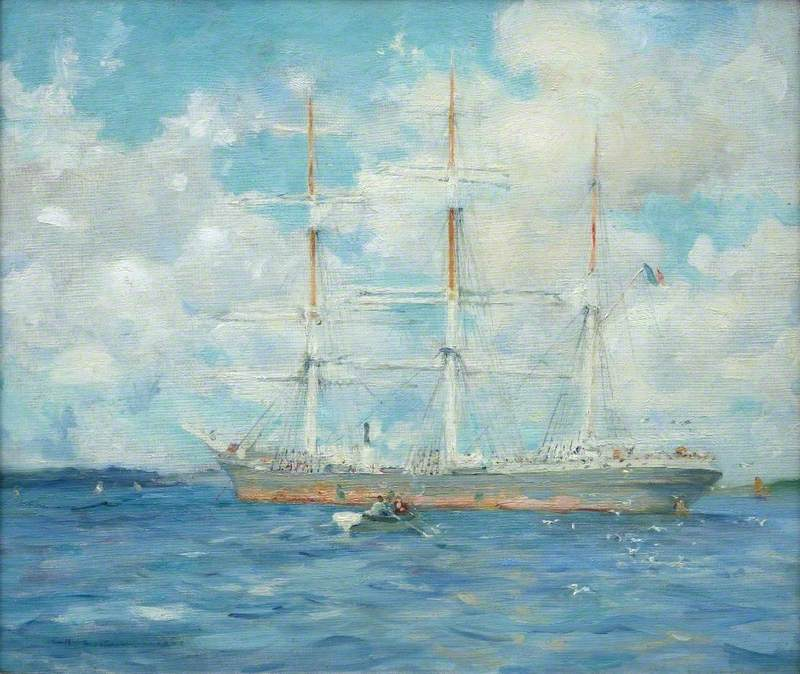
Painting by Henry Scott Tuke depicting a French Barque in Falmouth Bay

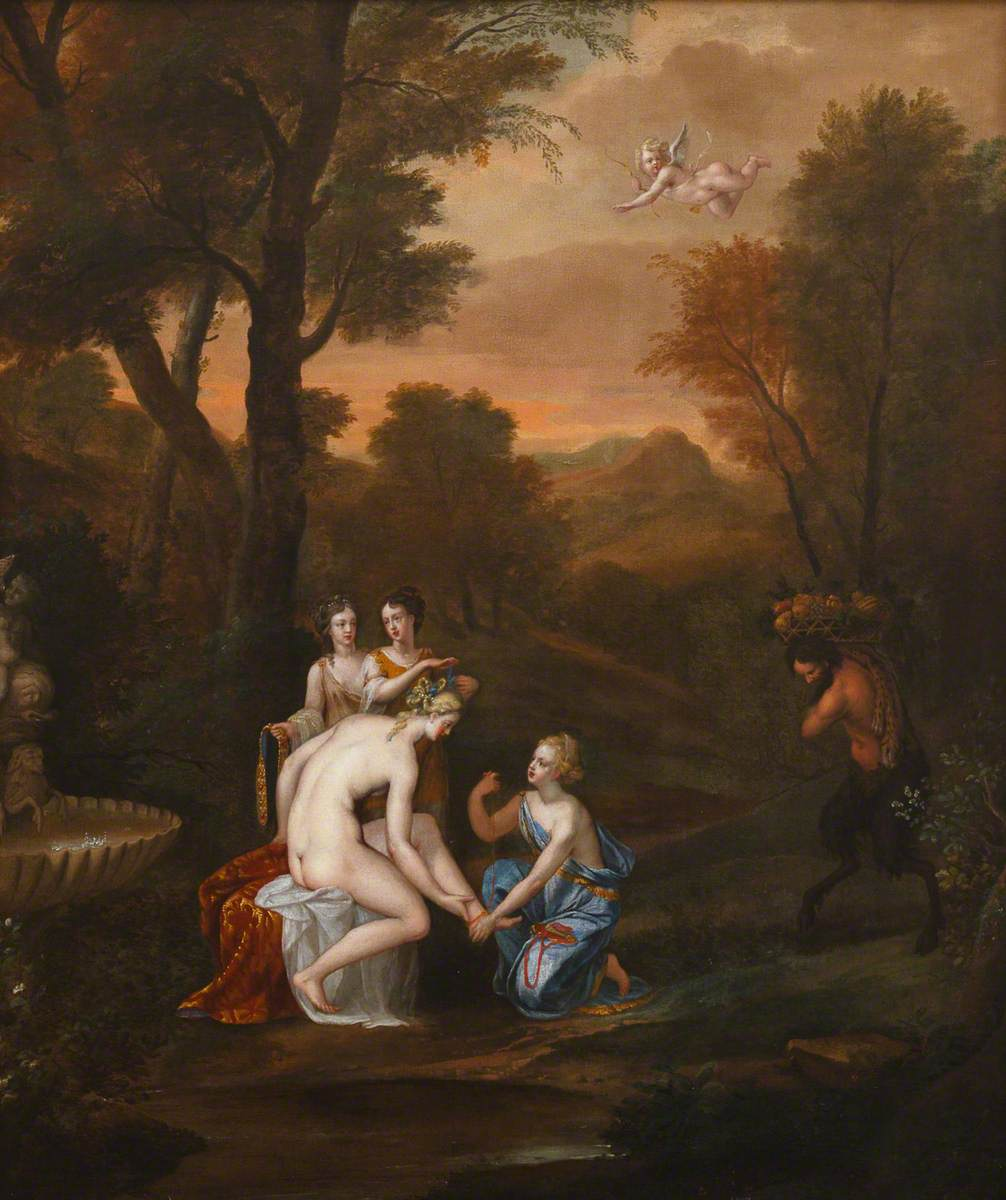
Painting by Anne Killigrew depicting Venus Attired by the Three Graces

Most of its art collection came from donations made by Alfred de Pass, a businessman and philanthropist who spent an important amount of his personal fortune on buying works of art, which were generously donated to museums and galleries throughout England and South Africa The town's art collection, administered by the gallery's director Brian Stewart until his untimely death in 2010, features works by major British artists including Sir Frank Brangwyn, Sir Edward Coley Burne-Jones, Charles Napier Hemy, Dame Laura Knight, Sir Alfred Munnings, Harry Ousey, William Strang, Henry Scott Tuke, John William Waterhouse, George Frederick Watts and Cornish painter John Opie.

Following a 2009 Art Fund bequest, Falmouth acquired a major collection including etchings by Pierre-Auguste Renoir and Edvard Munch, and several works by Prunella Clough, one of the most significant British painters and printmakers of the post-war period. This was followed in 2013 by a major gift of 20 works of art to the gallery from the British artist Robert Priseman (b. 1965). Known as The Robert Priseman Gift works of art by leading British artists of the 21st century such as Mary Webb, Sir Peter Blake, Nicholas Middleton, Marguerite Horner, Alex Hanna, Simon Burton, Simon Carter and Julian Brown were donated to the Gallery.

Falmouth also holds one of the most important master print collections outside London, including woodcuts, engravings, lithographs and screen prints by Albrecht Dürer, Rembrandt, Claude Lorrain, Adriaen van Ostade, Giovanni Battista Piranesi, Henri Matisse, Pablo Picasso, Francis Bacon, Merlyn Evans, Andy Warhol, Patrick Caulfield and Sir Peter Blake. In addition, Falmouth houses small but important collections of 20th-century and contemporary photography and Surrealism. It has the largest collection of Lee Miller photographs outside the 'Lee Miller Archive', as well as remarkable photographs by Eve Arnold, Fay Godwin and Linda McCartney. The Surrealist collection includes photographs by Roland Penrose and works by Henry Moore, Man Ray, Eileen Agar and the Cornish surrealist Jonathon Coudrille.

== Exhibitions ==
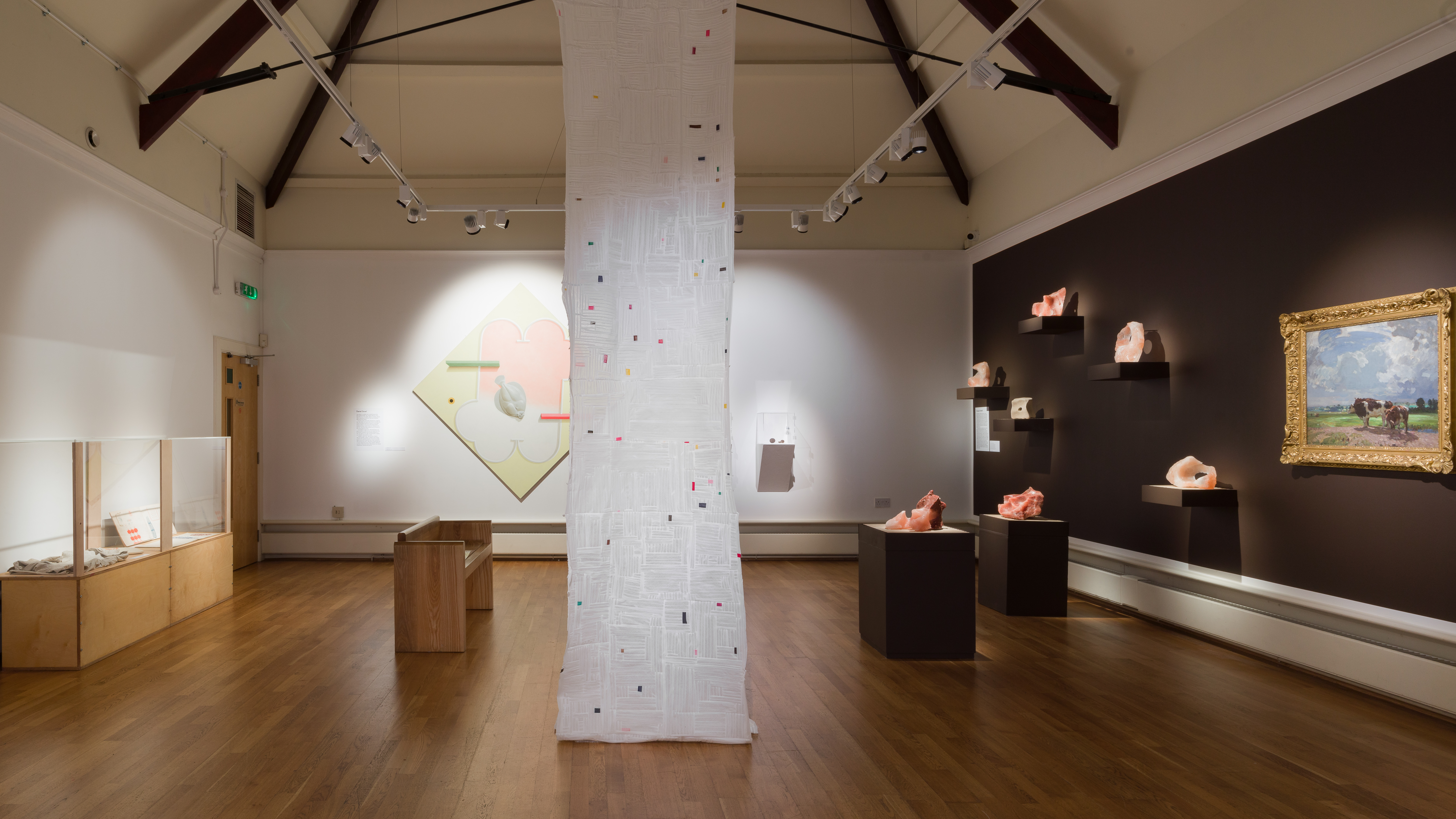
'Thanks for the Apples' installation view

Falmouth Art Gallery has an exhibition and event programme that display works from their permanent collection alongside major museum loans, work from local artists, community groups, school children and students.

Their art collection is large and eclectic for a small museum. The works are rotated regularly in the entrance and main galleries and they work to variety of themes.

The staircase gallery is used for community displays. Groups such as Falcare, Age Concern, local schools and Falmouth University visit on a regular basis and create art in response to works on display.

In November 2021 to January 2022, the gallery hosted a collaborative group exhibition titled 'Thanks for the Apples', which featured nationally and internationally recognised contemporary artists including Nicholas Deshayes and Caragh Thuring. The show was devised and produced by Naomi Frears and Ben Sanderson, who invited artists on a trip to Cornwall to visit the county's museums and explore their collections and archives. From the thousands of artefacts they saw during the week, both on display as well as behind the scenes, the artists each chose objects they were drawn to and produced work in response. From a hairball found inside a bull to a row of whimsy bottles and a tiny calendar, these artists focused their attention on objects and artworks that, while not hidden, can be overlooked, asking questions about the nature of these artefacts and what they might mean to people now.

The modern collection includes specially commissioned works for seasonal exhibitions such as the Darwin200 exhibitions in 2009, celebrating the arrival in Falmouth of Charles Darwin at the end of his HMS Beagle voyage in 1836. A plaque was erected as part of these celebrations in Falmouth marking the point where Darwin came ashore near the gallery and left by mail coach for Shrewsbury. Exhibitions and the permanent collection includes contemporary Cornish artists such as John Dyer the official Darwin200 artist for the Southwest.

In 2016, Cornwall-based artist Andrew Lanyon created an exhibition 'The Musings of Creatures - imagined in a barren land' which featured many artist and brought a range of new work into the Falmouth Art Gallery Collection including those by Andrew Litten, Carlos Zapda and David Kemp.

Notable previous exhibitions include the "Surrealists on Holiday" in Cornwall and Matisse; a list of previous exhibitions can be found on the website.

Exhibitions are mounted in partnership with many organisations including Newlyn School paintings from Penlee House Museum and Gallery, Royal Cornwall Museum Truro, Falmouth University and Newquay Zoo.

== Recent exhibitions ==
Main exhibitions:

Exhibition title	Dates	Information	Highlights
‘Hevva Hevva: Fishing in Cornwall’	25 June – 10 Sept 2022	An exhibition which explored the importance and impact of the fishing industry in Cornwall, through history up to present day.	Cornwall Climate Care’s documentary film ‘Plenty More Fish?’ (Cornwallclimate.org)
‘Polperro: Cornwall’s Forgotten Art Centre’	2 April - 18 June 2022	An exhibition of Polperro artists which provided an overview of how Polperro developed not only as an art centre but also as a fishing port. Curated by Cornish Art Historian David Tovey.	Mouat Loudan’s critically acclaimed 1888 Royal Academy exhibit, Fish Sale, Polperro, which has been unexhibitable for decades but which Falmouth Art Gallery arranged to be restored for the show. A photo of the old damage was displayed next to the freshly restored piece so visitors could see the changes.
'The Art of Animation From Scribble to Screen: Behind the Scenes of Animation Production'	29 January - 26 March 2022	This exhibition presented the inner workings of the production process involved with making animated films. A partnership exhibition with Falmouth University	Work from the companies behind such films as The Gruffalo, The Tiger Who Came to Tea, Mr. Bean, The Snail and the Whale and Shaun the Sheep.

Entrance Gallery exhibitions:

Exhibition title	Dates	Information	Highlights
The Surrealists in Cornwall 85th Anniversary	19 July - 24 September 2022	This exhibition celebrated the 85th anniversary of a holiday to Cornwall taken by a group of Surrealists.	Photographs by Lee Miller and Roland Penrose.
Roll the Dice	23 May - 16 July 2022	Artwork made by Falmouth Art Gallery’s youth climate activist art group displayed alongside works from the gallery collection which they used as inspiration in some of their workshops.	
Blake +7	2 April - 21 May 2022	Pop Art from the Falmouth Art Gallery collection.	Works by Sir Peter Blake RA, Tony Foster, Roy Lichtenstein, Andy Warhol.
'Rodney Peppe: The Storyteller'	Jan - Mar 2022	A showcase of objects, paintings, illustrations and animation from the well-known children's artist and author Rodney Peppe.	Episodes of the stop-motion animated series Huxley Pig, displayed next to the original models used in the show.

== Education ==
The gallery runs year-round regular free workshops for a wide range of visitors including families, babies and toddlers, schools and community groups. They particularly welcome visits from special needs groups and adults with severe learning difficulties.

== Awards and recognition ==
Falmouth Art Gallery has been nominated for or won 19 major awards including The Guardian newspaper Kids in Museums Award 2006 (Winner), the Sandford Award for Heritage Education, and the Gulbenkian Prize, Britain's most prestigious arts award.
