= Simon Carter (artist) =

English artist & curator (born 1961)

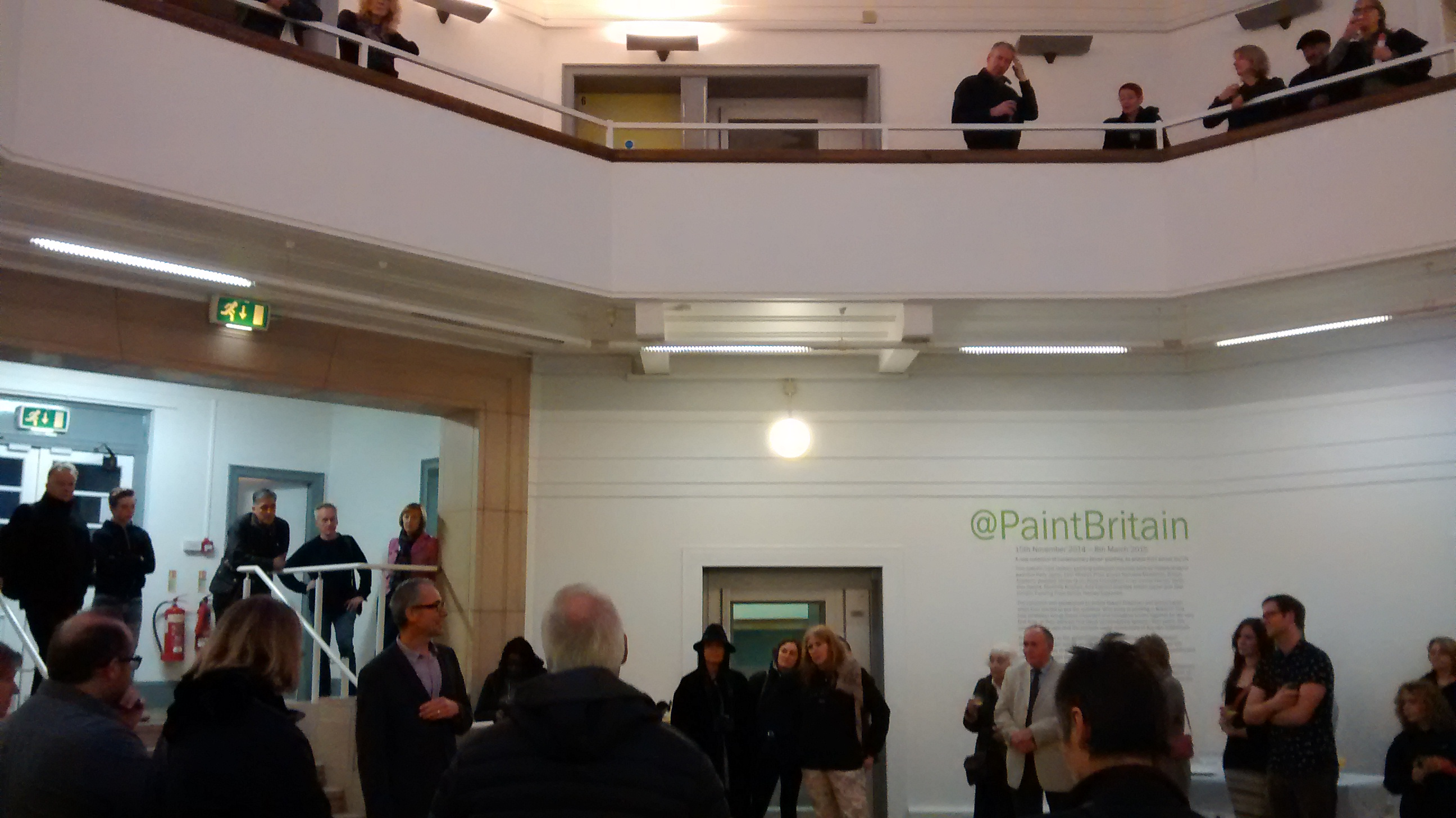
- Simon Carter gives an introductory speech at Ipswich Art School Gallery,2014.
- Born: Chelmsford, Essex, England
- Education: North East London Polytechnic
- Known for: Co-founder of Contemporary British Painting
- Website: Simon Carter

Simon Carter (born 1961 in Chelmsford, Essex) is an English artist and curator.

He studied at Colchester Institute (1980–81) and then North East London Polytechnic (1981–84). Often described as a 'painter's painter', solo exhibitions of Carter’s paintings have been held by The SEA Foundation, Tiburg; Messum's, London and Firstsite, Colchester. His work has been acquired by several art museums including Abbot Hall Art Gallery, Falmouth Art Gallery, Rugby Art Gallery and Museum, Swindon Art Gallery and the University of Essex.

Carter’s painting lies between figuration and abstraction, illustrating both landscape and the subjectivity of looking, to reflect a perceptual and psychological experience of the world.

In 2013 he collaborated with artist Robert Priseman to form the artist led group Contemporary British Painting and then the ‘East Contemporary Art Collection’, the first dedicated collection of contemporary art for the East of England which is housed at the University of Suffolk, Ipswich.

Carter is President of Colchester Art Society and has been Artist-in-residence at the University of Essex and Firstsite, Colchester.

== Selected solo exhibitions ==
- "Approaching the Remote" The Minories Galleries, Colchester, UK (2017)
- “Simon Carter: Paintings” SEA Foundation, Tilburg, The Netherlands (2016)
- “The Series Paintings” Messum's, London (2015)
- “A Walk in the Park” Art Exchange, University of Essex, England (2014)
- “New Paintings” St Marylebone Parish Church, London (2013)
- “The Shapes of Light” Messum's, London (2013)
- “Now and Then” Boat House Gallery, National Trust, Flatford, England (2012)
- “Borderlines” Messum's, London (2011)
- “Promenade” University of Essex Gallery, Essex, England (2010)
- “Representation” The Cut, Halesworth, Suffolk, England (2010)
- “New Paintings” Messum's, London (2009)
- “Get Constable” Town Hall Galleries, Ipswich, Suffolk, England (2008)
- “Another Day on the Beach” Firstsite, Colchester, Essex, England (2003)
- “Simon Carter, Paintings” Gainsborough's House, Sudbury, Suffolk, England (1993)

== Selected group exhibitions ==
- "Anything Goes?" Art Bermondsey Project Space, London (2017)
- "Drawing Into Landscape" The Crypt, Marylebone, London (2017)
- "Contemporary Masters From Britain" touring to Yantai Art Museum, the Jiangsu Art & Craft Museum, Nanjing Jiangsu Art Museum, Nanjing, and Tianjin Academy of Fine Arts, China (2017)
- "Contemporary Painting: In Good Health" Menier Gallery, London (2017)
- "Contemporary Masters From The East Of England" (2017) The Cut, Halesworth, UK
- "RWS Contemporary Watercolours" (2017) Bankside Gallery, London
- ‘‘Contemporary British Watercolours’’ (curated and exhibited) Burton Art Gallery & Museum, Bideford, Devon, England (2016)
- 70 Years of Colchester Art Society (2016) Firstsite - artists include Cedric Morris, John Nash (artist) and Valerie Thornton.
- ‘‘Belrose Highlights” SEA Foundation, Tilburg, The Netherlands (2016)
- ‘‘At Sea” The Gibberd Gallery, Harlow, England (2016)
- ‘‘Slippery and Amorphous” The Crypt Hall, Marylebone, London (2016)
- ‘‘The Brentwood Stations of the Cross” SE9 Container Gallery, Eltham, London (2015)
- ‘‘The Brentwood Stations of the Cross” Brentwood Cathedral, Essex, England (2015)
- ‘‘RWS Contemporary Watercolours” Bankside Gallery, London. Prizewinner (2015)
- ‘‘Contemporary British Painting” Huddersfield Art Gallery (2014)
- ‘‘@PaintBritain” Ipswich Art School Gallery, Suffolk (2014)
- ‘‘Messum's” Art Toronto, Canada (2014)
- ‘‘East Contemporary Art” Waterfront Gallery, UCS Ipswich (2014)
- ‘‘Messum's” Art Toronto, Canada (2013)
- ‘‘New East Anglian Painting” Ipswich Art School Gallery, Suffolk (2012)
- ‘‘Francis Bacon to Paula Rego” Abbot Hall Art Gallery, Kendal (2012)
- ‘‘East Coast Influences” Messum's, London (2012)
- ‘‘Summer Exhibition” Royal Academy of Arts, London (2010)
- ‘‘East Coast Influences” Messum's, London (2008)
- ‘‘Summer Exhibition” Royal Academy of Arts, London (2007)
- ‘‘Looking Forward” Agnew's, London (2007)
- ‘‘A Splash of Colour” Grafton Gallery, London (2006)
- ‘‘Painting is Dead, Long Live Painting” Hastings Museum and Art Gallery (2004)
- ‘‘This Flat Earth” University of Essex Gallery, Colchester (2000)
- ‘‘Cheers!” The British Lime Gallery, Los Angeles, USA (1999)
- ‘‘Artists in Wetzlar” Wetzlar, Germany (1999)
- ‘‘Shop till you Drop” Firstsite, Colchester, Essex (1999)
- ‘‘On the Border” Wolsey Gallery, Ipswich, Suffolk and firstsite, Colchester, Essex (1997)
- ‘‘Civic Centre” Ludwigsburg, Germany (1993)

== Selected collections ==
- Abbot Hall Art Gallery
- Art for Loan, Essex County Libraries
- East Contemporary Art Collection, University of Suffolk
- Falmouth Art Gallery
- Komechak Art Gallery, Benedictine University, Chicago, USA
- Madison Museum of Fine Art, Georgia, USA
- The Priseman Seabrook Collection
- Rugby Art Gallery and Museum
- Swindon Art Gallery
- University of Essex

== Selected publications ==
Simon Carter (2014) @PaintBritain: 45 Contemporary Painters

Simon Carter (2012) New East Anglian Painting

Simon Carter (1999) Another Day on the Beach: With essays by Crispin Downs, Annabel Longbourne and Professor Peter Vego
