= Linda Ingham =

British painter

- Born: 1964 (age 61–62); Cleethorpes, England
- Occupation: Artist
- Website: lindainghamart.com

Linda Ingham (born 1964 in Cleethorpes, England) is a British artist who studied European Humanities before achieving an MA in Fine Art from Lincoln University of Art, Architecture & Design in 2007.

A member of the artist led group Contemporary British Painting, Ingham is a regular visiting lecturer in painting at the University of Leeds School of Design and since 2008 has been the recipient of several awards from the Arts Council England for her studio practice and curatorial activities. Her work has been exhibited and collected by art museums in the UK and United States.

== Artistic practice ==
Her art observes the passing of time, often in relationship to a particular place on the south Humber estuary where she lives and works, or as self-portraiture. These take the form of painted or drawn constructions, modified books, and objects which are created through process and systems of recording and use of materials, such as jet, gathered from the beach; silverpoint and handmade gesso; and collage from antique books.

Of her work she says “for the past twenty years or so, my visual preoccupation within my practice has manifested itself in terms of human form. Sometimes this has been bodies, but the power, for me, is around the head in some way. I did a series of some two hundred works, derived from more than eighty participants, just concentrating on their facial features, but I’m not sure I’d call them portraits. I have done portraits of other people, but perhaps, as an only child, who often had to entertain herself, the self-portrait has been most consistently prevalent throughout my practice.”

== Professional recognition ==
A member of the artist led group Contemporary British Painting, Ingham is a regular visiting lecturer in painting at the University of Leeds School of Design and since 2008 has been the recipient of several awards from the Arts Council England for her studio practice and curatorial activities. Her work has been exhibited and collected by a number of art museums in the UK and United States including those of The University of Arizona Museum of Art, Swindon Art Gallery, Rugby Art Gallery and Museum, The Komechak Art Gallery, Chicago, Madison Museum of Fine Art, The Priseman Seabrook Collection and East Contemporary Art Collection at the University of Suffolk.

== Selected exhibitions ==
- “Contemporary Masters of the East of England”, The Cut, Halesworth (2017)
- “@Paintbritain”, Ipswich Museum (2014)
- “Contemporary British Painting”, Huddersfield Art Gallery (2014)
- “The Brentwood Stations of the Cross”, Brentwood Cathedral (2014)
- “About Face – Portrait & Figure Studies from the Swindon Collection of Modern Art”, Swindon Art Gallery, Wiltshire (2014)
- “Contemporary British Painting”, The Crypt, St Marylebone Parish Church, London (2013)
- “The Ruth Borchard Self Portrait Competition”, Kings Place, London (2011)
- “The Sketch Drawing Prize 20II”, Rabley Drawing Centre, Wiltshire (2011)

== Selected collections ==
- East Contemporary Art Collection
- Franklin College, Grimsby
- Komechak Art Gallery, Chicago
- The Priseman Seabrook Collection
- Madison Museum of Fine Art, Georgia
- Rugby Art Gallery and Museum
- Swindon Art Gallery
- University of Arizona Museum of Art
