= Paul Joannides =

Paul Evdoros Alexander Joannides (born 4 November 1945, London) is an emeritus professor of the History of Art in the University of Cambridge and fellow of Clare Hall.

== Career ==
Joannides completed his PhD on the French Romantic painter Eugène Delacroix under Professor Lee Johnson. He was appointed as assistant lecturer in 1973, lecturer in 1978, reader in 2002 and finally as professor in 2004. In 1981 he became a fellow at Clare Hall, Cambridge. He was chargé de mission of the Musée du Louvre from 1991 to 1992. Joannides is employed by the Department of History of Art at the University of Cambridge. He is a member of the Société de l'Histoire de l'Art Français.

== Work ==
He is best known for his numerous academic articles on Italian Renaissance artists and on the French Romantic painters in specialist art magazines like The Burlington Magazine and Apollo.

=== Books ===
- The Drawings of Raphael with a Complete Catalogue, University of California Press and Cambridge University Press, Berkeley/Cambridge 1983, ISBN 9780520050877.
- Masaccio and Masolino, Phaidon, London 1993, ISBN 9780714823980.
- Titian to 1518: The Assumption of Genius, Yale University Press, Yale 2002, ISBN 9780300087215.
- Reactions to the Master: Michelangelo's Effect on Art and Artists in the Sixteenth Century, co-edited with Francis Ames-Lewis, Ashgate Press, Aldershot 2003, ISBN 9780754608073.

=== Exhibition catalogues ===
- Michelangelo and His Influence: Drawings from Windsor Castle, traveling exhibition of 68 drawings from the Royal Collection, National Gallery of Art, Washington, Kimbell Art Museum, Fort Worth, Art Institute of Chicago, Fitzwilliam Museum, Cambridge, Queen's Gallery, London, October 1996–April 1998, NGA and Lund Humphries, Washington/London 1996, ISBN 9780853317227.
- Raphael and His Age – Drawings from the Palais des Beaux-Arts, Lille, exhibition of 57 drawings shown at the Cleveland Museum of Art, and the Palais des Beaux-Arts de Lille, 2002–2003. Réunion des Musées Nationeaux, Paris 2002, ISBN 9782711845521.
- Late Raphael, exhibition co-curated with Tom Henry (and syposium) at the Museo del Prado, Madrid, and Musée du Louvre, Paris, 2012–2013, Thames & Hudson, London 2013, ISBN 9780500970492.

=== Collection catalogues ===
- Dessins Italiens du Musée du Louvre: Michel-Ange. Élèves et Copistes with Véronique Goarin and Catherine Scheck, Grand Palais, Réunion des Musées Nationaux, Paris 2003, ISBN 9782711840441.
- The Drawings by Michelangelo and his Followers in the Ashmolean Museum, Cambridge University Press, Cambridge 2007, ISBN 9780521551335.

== Personal life ==
His second wife was art historian Marianne Ysobel Joannides, née Sachs, who died of cancer aged 61 at home in Saffron Walden on 23 March 2007. She had taught history of art at the University of Kent at Canterbury, and was latterly employed at Bonhams auctioneers in London as a consultant in old master drawings. Whilst working at Phillips auctioneers in 1994 she arranged a loan exhibition in London of Master Drawings from the De Pass Collection, Royal Cornwall Museum, Truro (Catalogue ISBN 0-9507943-1-7).
