= Julian Brown =

Julian Brown may refer to:

- Julian Brown (painter) (born 1974), British artist
- Julian Brown (palaeographer) (1923–1987), English palaeographer and academic
- Julian Brown (politician) (1850–1925), Australian political figure
