= Municipal Buildings, Falmouth =

Municipal building in Falmouth, Cornwall, England

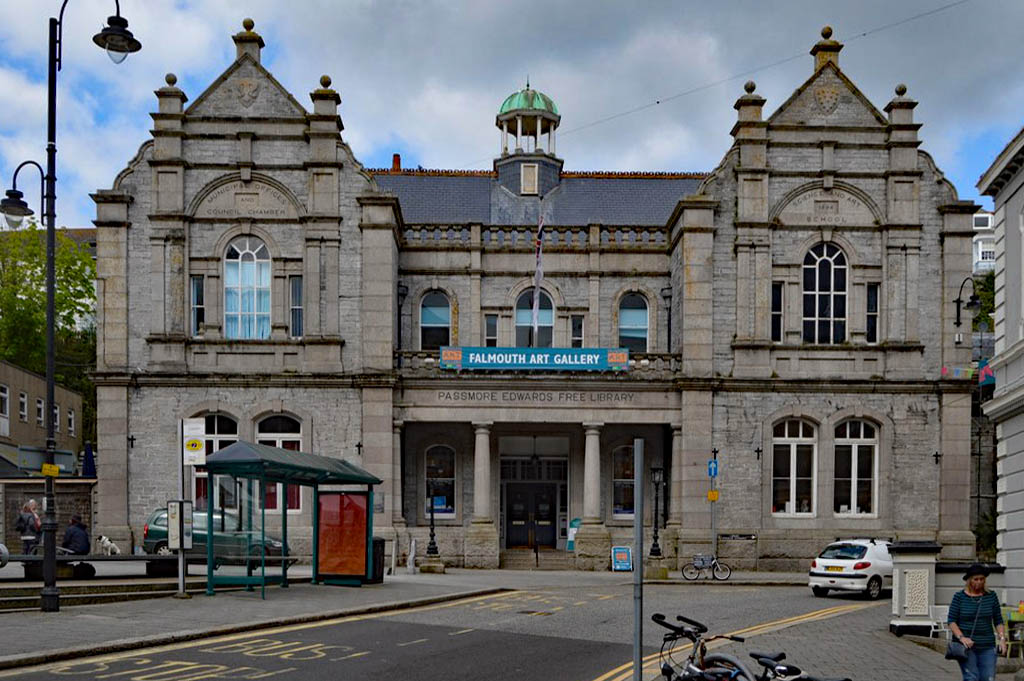
- Municipal Buildings, Falmouth

- Shown in Cornwall
- 50.1557°N 5.0725°W
- Location: The Moor, Falmouth, Cornwall, England

History
- Built: 1896

Site notes
- Architect: William Henry Tressider
- Architectural style: Italianate style

Listed Building – Grade II
- Official name: Falmouth Art Gallery and Library; Passmore Edwards Free Library
- Designated: 16 December 1994
- Reference no.: 1269979

The Municipal Buildings are based on The Moor in Falmouth, Cornwall, England. The structure, which currently accommodates both Falmouth Art Gallery and Falmouth Library, is a Grade II listed building.

== History ==
The first municipal building in Falmouth was the Old Town Hall in the High Street which was built as a Congregational chapel in 1710. In 1866, the corporation moved to its second municipal building, a new town hall on The Moor, now the Palacio Lounge. In the late 19th century, the borough leaders decided that a more substantial structure was needed to accommodate a free library and a science and art school as well as the municipal offices: the site they selected on the west side of The Moor had been used as the town quarry. The cost of construction was financed by public subscription: over half the cost was contributed by a combination of a donation of £2,000 from the philanthropist and former member of Parliament, John Passmore Edwards, and a bequest of another £2,000 from a Truro businessman, Octavius Allen Ferris.

The foundation stone for the new building was laid by on 13 April 1894. It was designed by William Henry Tressider in the Italianate style, built in grey limestone at a cost of £7,000 and was opened in 1896. The design involved a symmetrical main frontage with five bays facing onto The Moor with the end bays projected forward and gabled; the central section of three bays featured, on the ground floor, a loggia with Tuscan order columns supporting an entablature and a frieze inscribed with the words "Passmore Edwards Free Library" and, on the first floor, three round headed windows flanked by pilasters supporting an entablature and a balustrade. The end bays featured pairs of segmental windows on the ground floor and Venetian windows on the first floor flanked by pilasters supporting entablatures and pediments with shields in the tympania. At roof level there was a central octagonal lantern with a dome. Internally, the council chamber and the municipal offices were in the wing on the left, the free library was in the central section and the science and art school was in the wing on the right.

Following the decline in the Cornish coal mining industry, there was limited demand for scientific teaching in Falmouth and the School of Science and Art was replaced by the new Falmouth School of Art in Arwenack Avenue in 1902. This allowed space for expansion and the municipal buildings continued to serve as the borough headquarters for much of the 20th century.

The building ceased to be the local seat of government after the enlarged Carrick District Council was formed in Truro in 1974. At that time, the newly formed Falmouth Town Council took over the management of Falmouth Art Gallery, which had been based in Grove Place, and Cornwall County Council took over the management of the library. The vacated space on the first floor of the municipal buildings enabled the town council to relocate the art gallery into the building on 12 October 1978. The gallery was renovated with grant aid from the Heritage Lottery Fund and other funding bodies to a design by the architectural firm, Poynton, Bradbury, Wynter, Cole, in the mid-1990s before being re-opened by Sir Tim Rice on 31 May 1996.

The structure became wholly devoted to cultural activities, with the library on the ground floor and the art gallery of the first floor, after the town council relocated its own offices to the old post office, to the immediate south of the municipal buildings, in 2016.
