= Marguerite Horner =

British artist

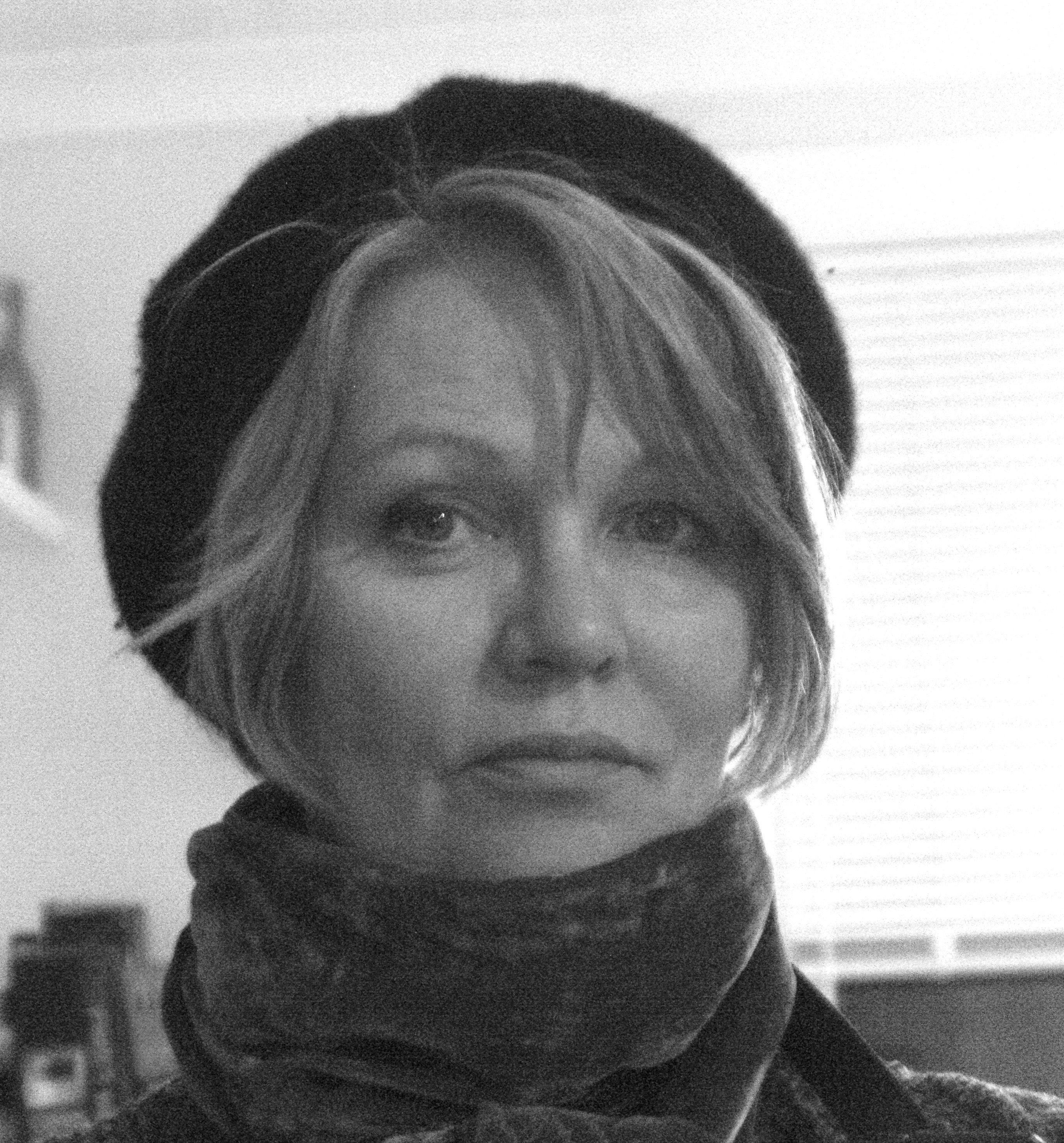
- Born: Lincoln, England
- Education: Sheffield University; City and Guilds Art School
- Known for: Painting, British Women Artists Award 2018, MS Amlin Prize 2017.
- Website: http://www.margueritehorner.com/

Marguerite Horner is a British artist who won the 2018 British Women Artist Award. Her paintings aim to investigate, among other things, notions of transience, intimacy, loss and hope. She uses the external world as a trigger or metaphor for these experiences and through a period of gestation and distillation, makes a series of intuitive decisions that lead the work towards completion.

A Book 'Numinous' is published on Marguerite Horners work by Hurtwood press and distributed through Thames & Hudson. The publication features a foreword by writer Matt Price and essay by multidisciplinary scholar Dr Matthew Holman. A feature titled 'Chasing Demons Away' written by Professor Frances Spalding CBE FRSL was published in The Tablet, 7 February 2026. Vol 280//No.9639 ISSN: 00398837 about her exhibition 'All of your Demons will Wither Away' at Clare Hall, Cambridge University.

== Biography ==
Marguerite Horner was born in Lincoln, and in her early twenties studied art at Sheffield University. She graduated with an M.A. from the City and Guilds of London Art School in 2004 and was presented with the Kidd Rapinet Prize for outstanding degree work. Since graduating from City and Guilds of London Art school in 2004, Horner has exhibited internationally in Art fairs and group shows. In 2011, she exhibited at the 54th Venice Biennale with Afternoon Tea for the WW Gallery and in 2012 received her first London solo exhibition, The Seen and Unseen, at The Pitzhanger Manor Gallery. The catalogue essay was written by Lady Marina Vaizey CBE. In 2017, Horner won the NOA17 MS Amlin Prize for "Church", a painting that was inspired by a humanitarian visit to the Calais refugee "jungle" in 2014, with a "Cenacle" prayer group formed by the Chiswick Comboni nuns. In 2018, Horner won the British Women Artist Award and examples of her work were acquired by the Yale Centre for British Art in New Haven Connecticut. Her work has also been acquired by a number of museums including the Abbot Hall Art Gallery, Falmouth Art Gallery, the Madison Museum of Fine Art, Rugby Art Gallery and Museum, Schneider Museum of Art, Sheffield City Art Gallery, Swindon Art Gallery and the Nanxi Academy of Art Collection in China. In 2026 Marguerite Horner was invited by Professor Frances Spalding CBE FRSL to have a solo exhibition of paintings at Clare Hall, which is part of Cambridge University. The exhibition was called 'All of your demons will wither away', The catalogue's introduction was by Frances Spalding, and included an essay on her paintings by the novelist William Boyd CBE FRSL.

After graduating with her BA Fine Art Horner trained and worked as a scenic artist at the BBC for 3 years. Then Marguerite worked as a freelance scenic artist and mural painter on advertising and editorial campaigns, films and BBC TV productions. Her clients included the Sunday Times Magazine and World of Interiors. In 2012 Horner took a Foundation degree in pastoral mission at Heythrop College, a Philosophy and Theology college of the University of London.

== Selected solo exhibitions ==
- All of your demons will wither away', Clare Hall, Cambridge University, Cambridge. (2026)
- Perpetual Light, The Jesuit Centre, Mayfair, London. (2024)
- Numinous': The Crypt, St Marylebone Parish Church, London.' (2023)
- Back to Verve, Chelsea Arts Club, Billiard Room. Chelsea, London.(2022)
- Transcends All Understanding, Bermondsey Project Space, London (2020)
- Time Keeps Slipping, Bermondsey Project Space, London (2019)
- Keep me Safe, Westminster Reference Library and Farm Street Church, Mayfair, London (2017)
- Cars and Streets, Bermondsey Project Space, London (2015)
- Through each Today, The Crypt, St Marylebone Parish Church, London (2013)
- The Seen and Unseen, Pitzhanger Manor, London (2012)
- Marguerite Horner: Paintings, Usher Gallery, Lincoln (2006)
- Marguerite Horner: Paintings, Mappin Art Gallery, Sheffield (2006)

=== Selected group exhibitions ===
- Atemkristall (Breathcrystal) Blyth Gallery, 'Sherfield Building, Imperial College, London, SW7 2AZ - curated by Peter Harrap, Anna McNay and Florin Ungureanu.(2025) The Exhibition will tour to the Romanian Cultural Institute in New York and Berlin.'
- eXhibition of SMALL things with BIG ideas, White Conduit Projects, Islington - curated by Paul Carey-Kent and Yuki Miyake.(2024)
- X-Contemporary British Painters 10th Anniversary Exhibition, Newcastle Contemporary Art - curated by Dr Narbi Price. (2023)
- Beyond Other Horizons, Iasi Palace of Culture, Romania (1–31 March 2020) – curated by Peter Harrap; Anna McNay; Florin Ungureanu, funded by the Romanian Cultural Institute with a A British Council symposium 3 March 2020:
- When London Meets Wenzhou (2019), Nanxi Academy, Wenzhou, China.
- The Ruskin Prize Exhibition (2019), shortlisted
- The Royal Academy Summer Exhibition (2005–2008–2010–2011–2012–2013–2016–2019)
- The Threadneedle Prize Exhibition (2010–2013–2018)
- Lynn Painter Stainer Prize Exhibition (2010–2012–2017–2018)
- The National Open Art Competition (2011–2012–2014–2015–2016–2017)
- The Griffin Open (2015)
- The ING Discerning Eye (2005–2010–2011–2012–2013–2014–2015–2016–2018–2020–2021-2024)
- The Sunday Times Watercolour Exhibition (2014)
- The Royal Institute of painters in Watercolour' Exhibition: Mall Galleries London: (2023-2024-2026)
- The Royal Watercolour Society Contemporary Watercolour Competition (2019)
- 58th Venice Biennale 'Alive in the Universe' Caroline Wiseman gallery (2019)
- Dear Christine...A Tribute to Christine Keeler, Vane gallery, Newcastle (2019); Elysium Gallery, Swansea (2019); Arthouse1 London (2020).
- 54th Venice Biennale Afternoon Tea, WW Gallery (2011)
- Made in Britain, National Gallery, Gdansk, Poland (2019)
- LANDE: The Calais 'Jungle' and Beyond, Pitts Rivers Museum, Oxford (2019)curated by Majid Adin, Shaista Aziz, Caroline Gregory, Dan Hicks, Sarah Mallet, Nour Munawar, Sue Partridge, Noah Salibo and Wshear Wali
- The Trinity Buoy Wharf Drawing Prize- shortlisted (2018)
- In the City, East Gallery, Norwich University of the Arts, then Stephen Lawrence Gallery, London (2018)
- Getting Away, Arthouse1, Bermondsey, London SE1 then Quay Gallery, Isle of Wight (2018)
- The Inner and the Outer, co-curated by Horner and Trevor Burgess. Bermondsey Project Space, London SE1 3UW.(2018)
- In the Future, Collyer Bristow Gallery, London (2018)
- Contemporary Masters from Britain: 80 British Painters of the 21st Century, toured to four venues in China: Yantai Art Museum; Artall Gallery, Nanjing; Jiangsu Arts Museum, Nanjing: Tianjin Academy of Fine Art, Tianjin, China (2017)
- The National Open Art Competition (2017). Winner of the MSAmlin Award for painting Church
- Anything Goes, Art Bermondsey Project Space, London (2017)
- Silence Un-Scene, Lewisham Art House, London (2017)
- Edgelands, UK Tour: APT Gallery London,(2016); Aberystwth; Hartlepool; Alison Richards Building, Cambridge; Beverley Museum & Gallery (2017)
- Contemporary Master from the East of England, The Cut, Halesworth. Suffolk (2017)
- The Derwent Art Prize (2016)
- Contemporary British Watercolours, Burton Art Gallery & Museum, Devon (2016) then at The Oriel Gallery, Ballinskelligs, Co. Kerry (2015) and Maidstone Museum & Bentlif Art Gallery, Kent (2015)
- Rugby Collection 2015, Rugby Art Gallery and Museum (2015)
- Brentwood Stations of The Cross, Brentwood Cathedral (2015)
- Present Tense, Swindon Art Gallery (2015)
- @PaintBritain, Ipswich Art School Gallery, Ipswich (2014)
- Contemporary British Painting, The Crypt St Marylebone Parish Church, London (2014) and Huddersfield Art Gallery (2014)
- The Open West, the Wilson, Cheltenham Art Gallery & Museum (2013)
- In The City, The Lion and Lamb Gallery, London (2011)
- The Artsway Open (2010)
- The MacGuffin, WW Gallery, London (2005)
- Mirage of Mind, Century Gallery, London (2005)
- Falmouth Art Gallery
- The Priseman Seabrook Collection
- The Komechak Art Gallery of Benedictine University, Chicago. U.S.
