= Hanny =

Hanny may refer to:

First name:

- Hanny Kellner (1892-?), Austrian diver who competed in the 1912 Olympics
- Hanny Michaelis (1922–2007), Dutch poet
- Hanny Nahmias (born 1959), Israeli singer, actress, writer and television personality
- Hanny Saputra (born 1965), Indonesian director

Nickname:

- Johanna Allston (born 1986), Australian orienteer

Surname:

- Frank Hanny (1896-1947), American National Football League player
- John R. Hanny, American chef and author

== See also ==
- Hannay (disambiguation)
