= Stephen Newton (artist) =

British artist

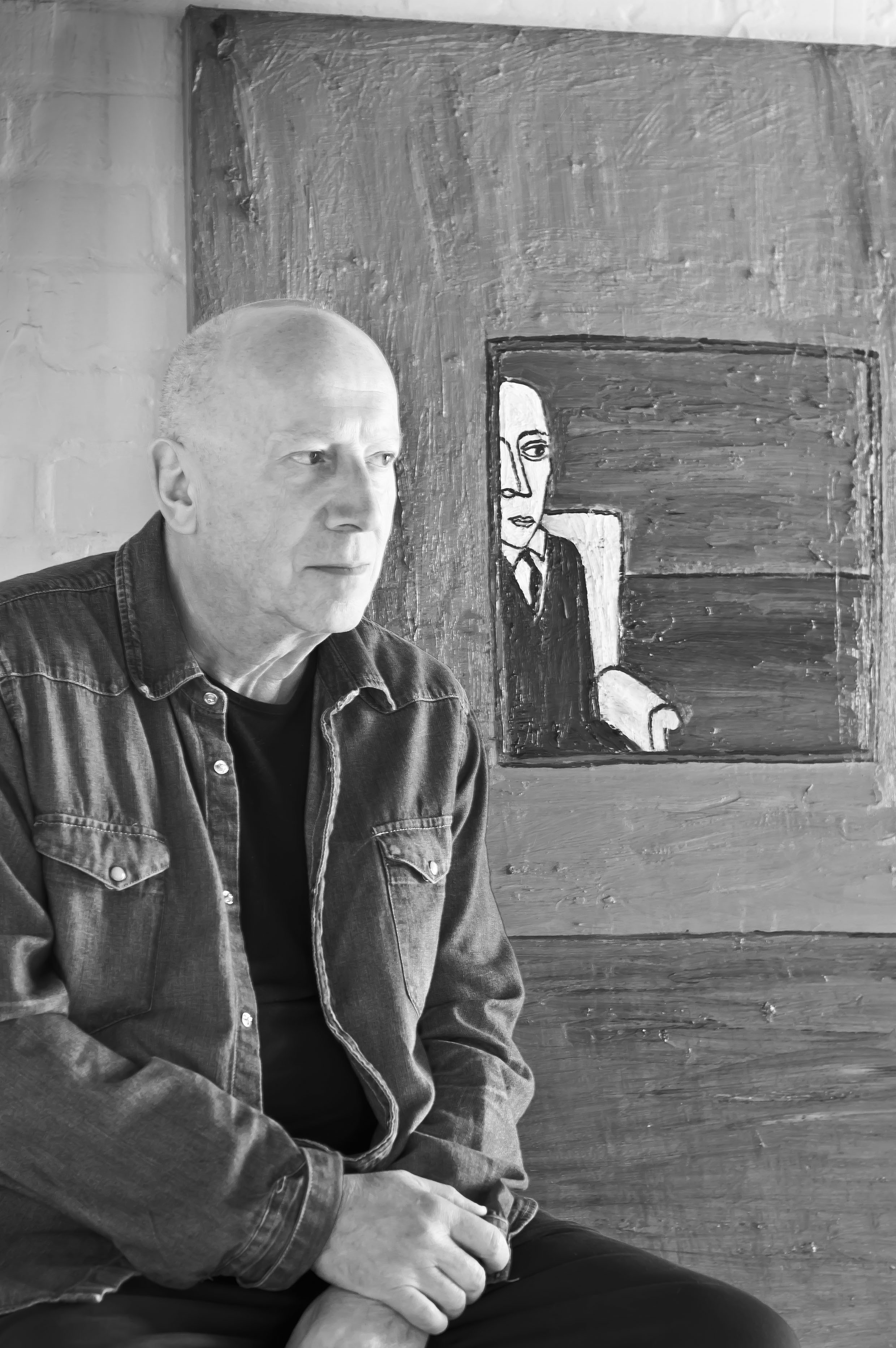
- Born: Grimsby, Lincolnshire, England
- Occupation: Artist
- Website: Stephen Newton

Stephen Newton (born 1948) is a British artist. The art critic Mel Gooding described Newton's painting as a “psycho-conceptual project”. They explore primitive manic states; isolation; disassociation; loss; fear; loneliness and supplication, themes containing sinister elements common to us all.

Through years of contemplation and engagement with painting and drawing, Newton has developed a style that merges the physical and intellectual aspects of the creative process, characterized by simplified, elemental imagery.

== Biography ==
Newton was born in Grimsby in 1948. He gained an M.A. in Fine Art at Nottingham Trent University in 1986, an M.A. in Art and Psychotherapy from the University of Sheffield in 1993 and a PhD in the psychoanalysis of the creative process, Department Of Psychiatry, University of Sheffield in 1998. In 1998 Newton was appointed Visiting Lecturer, School of Art, University of Sunderland and visiting professor, University of Northumbria at Newcastle. In 1999 he was appointed Visiting lecturer, Centre for Psychoanalytical Studies, University of Essex and in 2010 Visiting Lecturer, University of Lincoln.

Through an examination of psychoanalysis and psychometry of art, Newton has evolved a series of paintings related to primitive manic states; isolation; disassociation; loss; fear; loneliness and supplication. Art critic Mel Gooding described Newton's paintings as a “psycho- conceptual project”. His work has been exhibited across the UK in exhibitions which include: ‘Stephen Newton: Abstract Realisms’ Art Bermondsey Project Space, London (2016), ‘Stephen Newton Retrospective’ Abbey Walk Gallery, Grimsby (2015), ‘Etchings 1997-2000’ Jesmond Dene House, Newcastle (2005), ‘Etchings and Paintings 1997-2000’ Cooper Gallery, Duncan of Jordanstone College of Art and Design, University of Dundee (2001), ‘Stephen Newton: Solo Show’, Stanley Picker Gallery, Kingston University, London (1998), ‘Contemporary British Painting’ Huddersfield Art Gallery (2014), ‘@paintbritain’, Ipswich Art Gallery and Museum (2014) and ‘Images of Working Class Life’, Viking Gallery, Jarrow (1998). A number of art museums have acquired work by Newton, including Abbot Hall Art Gallery, Madison Museum of Fine Art, Rugby Art Gallery and Museum and Swindon Art Gallery

Newton has written three books; 'The Politics and Psychoanalysis of Primitivism' published by Ziggurat Books International (1993), ‘Painting, Psychoanalysis, and Spirituality’ published by Cambridge University Press (2001) and ‘Art & Ritual: A Painter's Journey’ published by Ziggurat Books International (2008). A fourth book, 'The Hidden Essence of Art', is due to be published in 2021 by Morel Books.

Newton is a company director of Bermondsey Project Space.

== Selected solo exhibitions ==
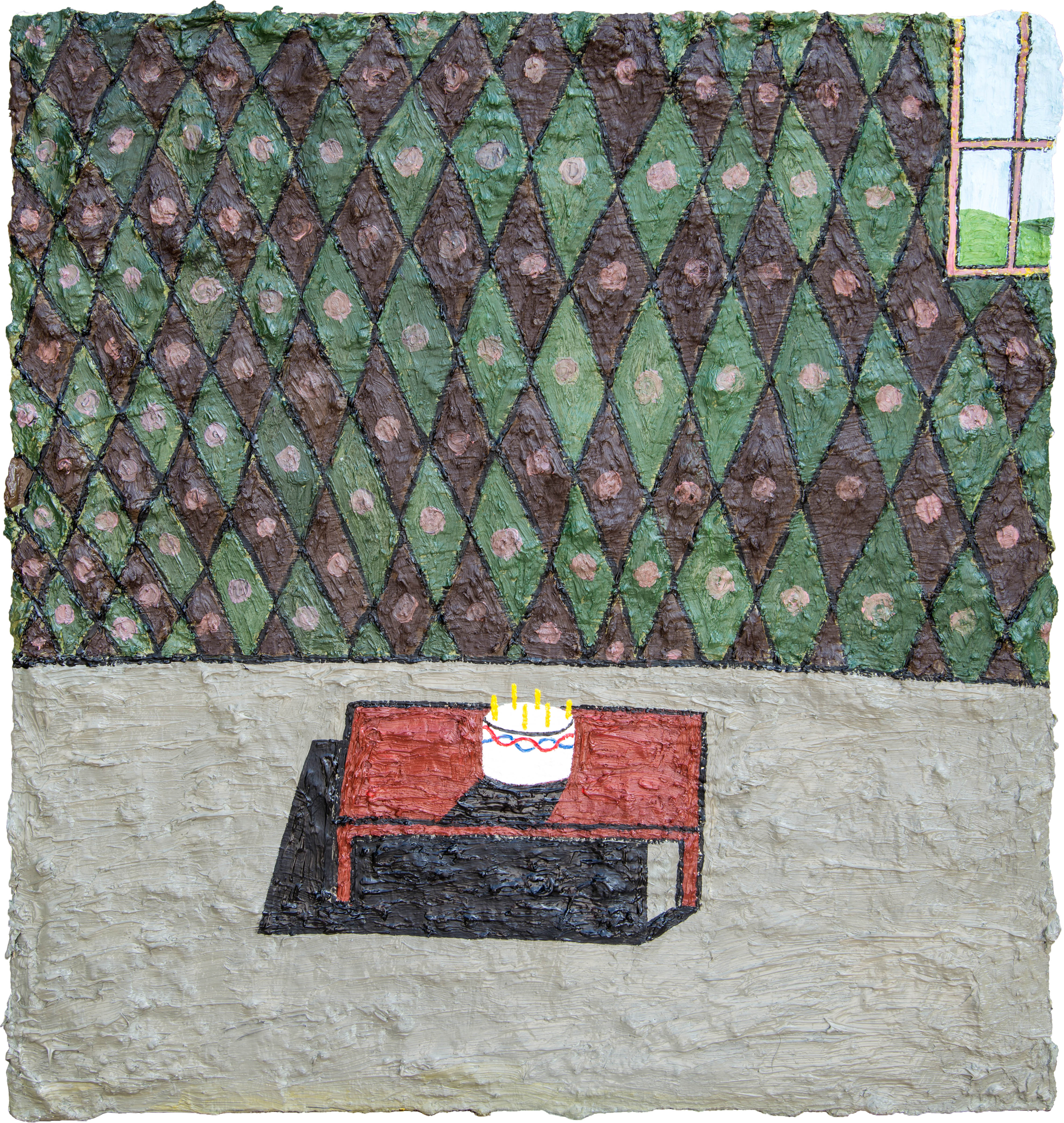
Birthday party (26x24in) 2015

- “Stephen Newton: Abstract Realisms” Art Bermondsey Project Space, London (2016)
- “Stephen Newton Retrospective” Abbey Walk Gallery, Grimsby (2015)
- “Life in the Abstract” Studio Eleven Gallery, Hull, Yorkshire (2014)
- “Etchings 1997-2000” Jesmond Dene House, Newcastle (2005)
- “Etchings and Paintings 1997-2000” Cooper Gallery, Duncan of Jordanstone College of Art and Design, University of Dundee (2001)
- “Etchings and Paintings 1997-2000” Gallery North, Northumbria University (2000)
- “Stephen Newton: Solo Show” Stanley Picker Gallery, Kingston University, London (1998)
- “Paintings 1975-1995” Mappin Gallery, Sheffield (1996)

== Selected group exhibitions ==
- “Contemporary British Painting” Huddersfield Art Gallery (2014)
- “@paintbritain” Ipswich Art Gallery and Museum (2014)
- “Images of Working Class Life”, Viking Gallery, Jarrow (1998)
- “Art’s Hidden Order” Mappin Gallery, Sheffield (1996)

== Selected collections ==
- Abbot Hall Art Gallery
- Madison Museum of Fine Art
- The Priseman Seabrook Collection
- Rugby Art Gallery and Museum
- Swindon Art Gallery

== Selected publications ==
- (2008) Newton, Stephen James. Art & Ritual: A Painter's Journey. 230 pages, Ziggurat Books International.
- (2001) Newton, Stephen James. Painting, Psychoanalysis, and Spirituality (Contemporary Artists and their Critics). 288 pages, Cambridge University Press.
- (1993) Newton, Stephen James. The Politics and Psychoanalysis of Primitivism. 112 pages, Ziggurat Books International.
