= Alex Hanna =

English artist

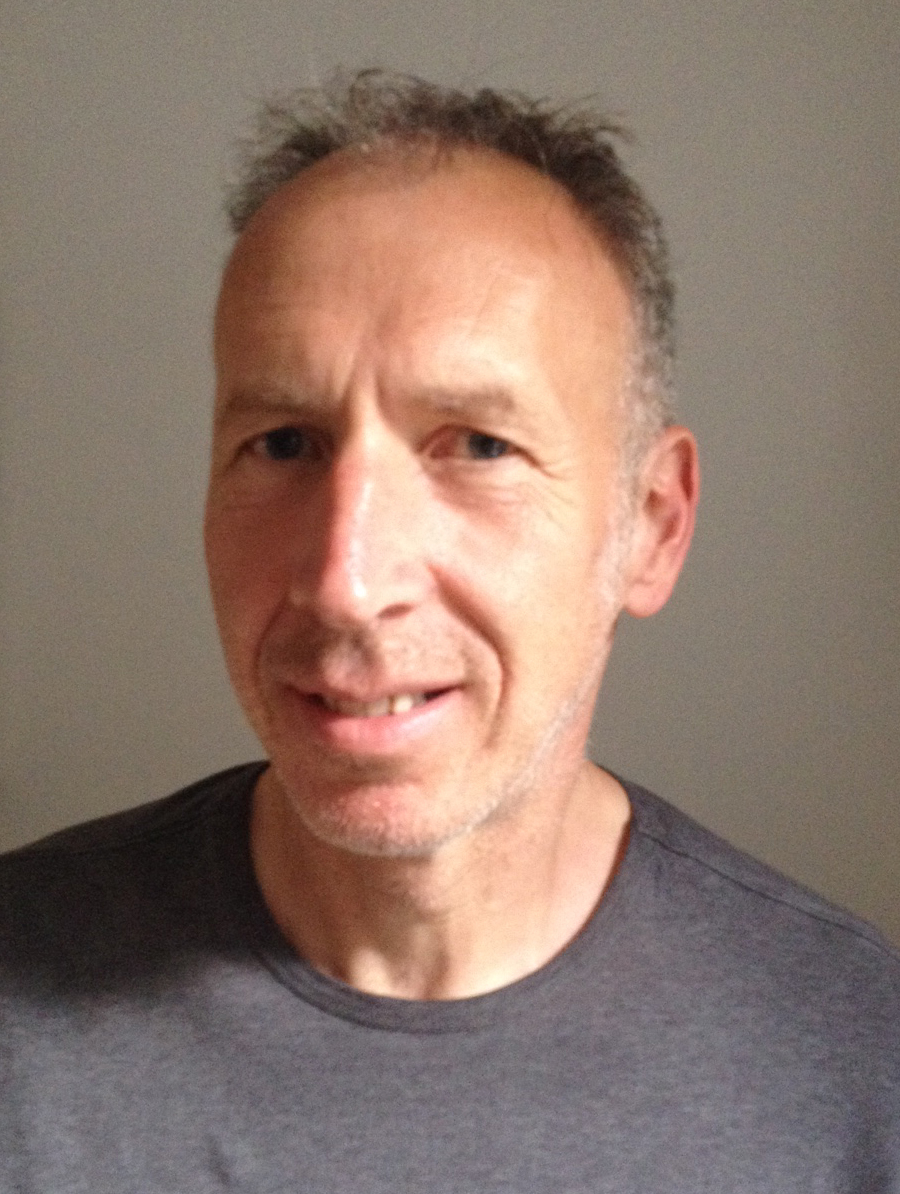
- Portrait of Alex Hanna
- Born: 1964 (age 61–62); Birkenhead, England
- Occupation: Artist
- Website: www.alexhannahub.com

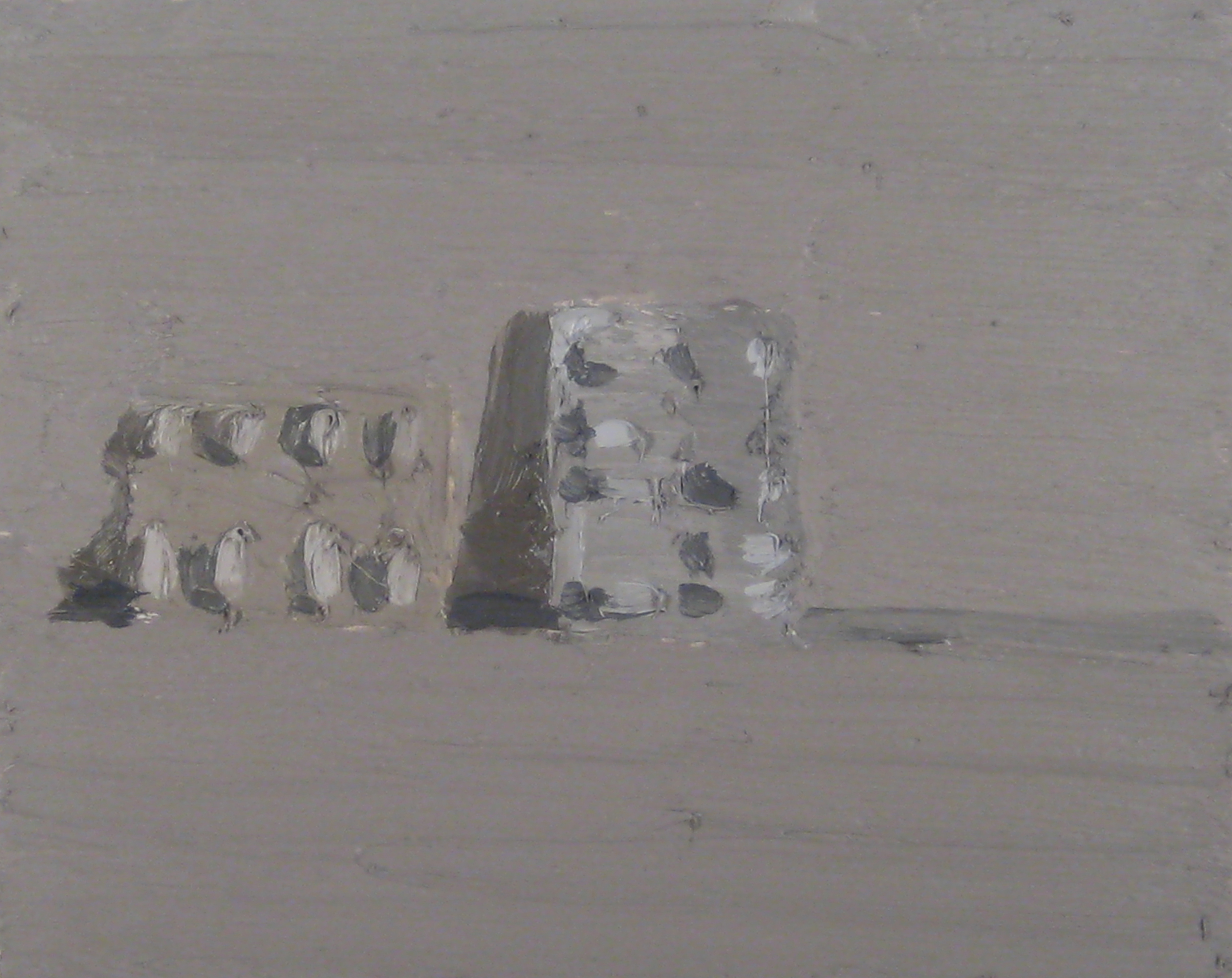
Oil Painting on panel, 20 x 25cm, 2016

Alex Hanna (born 1964) is an English artist. He studied Fine Art at Sunderland Polytechnic from 1983 to 1986. His paintings display arrangements of disposable packaging and objects which have little or no material value. These objects are arranged in a traditional still life format and painted using process based and traditional painting techniques.

Hanna has exhibited at the National Portrait Gallery, London, Glasgow School of Art, and the Royal Academy of Arts. His paintings have been acquired by Abbot Hall Art Gallery, Falmouth Art Gallery, Swindon Art Gallery, The Priseman Seabrook Collection, Rugby Art Gallery and Museum, and the University of Arizona Museum of Art.

== Selected exhibitions ==
- “Perceptions of the Mundane” The Crypt, St Marylebone Parish Church, London (2015)
- “Documentary Realism: Painting in the Digital Age” The Crypt, St Marylebone Parish Church, London (2015)
- “Lynn Painter-Stainers Prize” The Mall Galleries, London (2015)
- “Ambiguous Practices” Aberystwyth University (2015)
- “The Brentwood Stations of the Cross” Brentwood Cathedral (2014)
- “@Paintbritain” Ipswich Museum (2014)
- “Contemporary British Painting” Huddersfield Art Gallery (2014)
- “Contemporary British Painting” The Crypt, St Marylebone Parish Church, London (2013)
- “Threadneedle Prize” Mall Galleries, London (2013)
- “Royal Academy Summer Exhibition” Royal Academy of Arts, London (2013)
- “Artist in Action for Education” Mok Space Gallery, London (2013)
- “Marmite Painting Prize for Painting” Mackintosh Museum, Glasgow School of Art (2013)
- “Salon Art Prize”, John Jones, London (2012)
- “ BP Portrait Award” National Portrait Gallery, London (2012)

== Selected collections ==
- Abbot Hall Art Gallery
- Falmouth Art Gallery
- Swindon Art Gallery
- The Priseman Seabrook Collection
- Rugby Art Gallery and Museum
- University of Arizona Museum of Art
