= Ousey =

Ousey is a surname. Notable people with the surname include:

- Graham Ousey, American sociology and criminologist
- Harry Ousey (1915–1985), British painter
