= Julian Brown (painter) =

British artist (born 1974)

- Education: Royal Academy Schools Liverpool John Moores University
- Occupations: Artist, Painter
- Website: Julian Brown Official

Julian Brown (born 1974) is a British artist. He lives and works in London. He studied at Liverpool John Moores University, England (1993–96) and Royal Academy Schools, London (1998–2001). His work is heavily influenced by childhood visions and the folk-art from his Polish mother. He was long-listed for the John Moores Painting Prize in 2016 and in 2012 was shortlisted for the Marmite Prize in Painting IV (2012–13). Brown has exhibited his work nationally and internationally and is a member of Contemporary British Painting.

== Selected collections ==
- Abbot Hall Art Gallery
- China Academy of Art
- The Priseman Seabrook Collection of 21st Century British Painting
- Falmouth Art Gallery

== Selected solo exhibitions ==
- 2013 – Julian Brown (with Chris Daniels), Mayor's Parlour, London
- 2014 – Julian Brown at St. Marylebone Crypt, London
- 2016 – A Sense of Wonder, York College Gallery, York, England
- 2017 – Mono Fauna, Westminster Arts Library, London

== Selected group exhibitions ==
- 2014 – Priseman Seabrook Collection, Huddersfield Art Gallery, England
- 2015 – Contemporary British Abstraction, SE9 Container Gallery, London
- 2015 – @PaintBritain, Ipswich Art College Gallery, Ipswich, England
- 2015 – Contemporary British Drawing, X'Ian Academy of Fine Arts, China
- 2015 – Contemporary British Watercolours, Maidstone Museum and Bentlif Art Gallery, England
- 2016 – Contemporary British Watercolours, Burton Art Gallery & Museum, Bideford, Devon, England
- 2016 – John Moores Painting Prize Exhibition, Walker Art Gallery, Liverpool, England
