= Palacio Lounge =

Municipal building in Falmouth, Cornwall, England

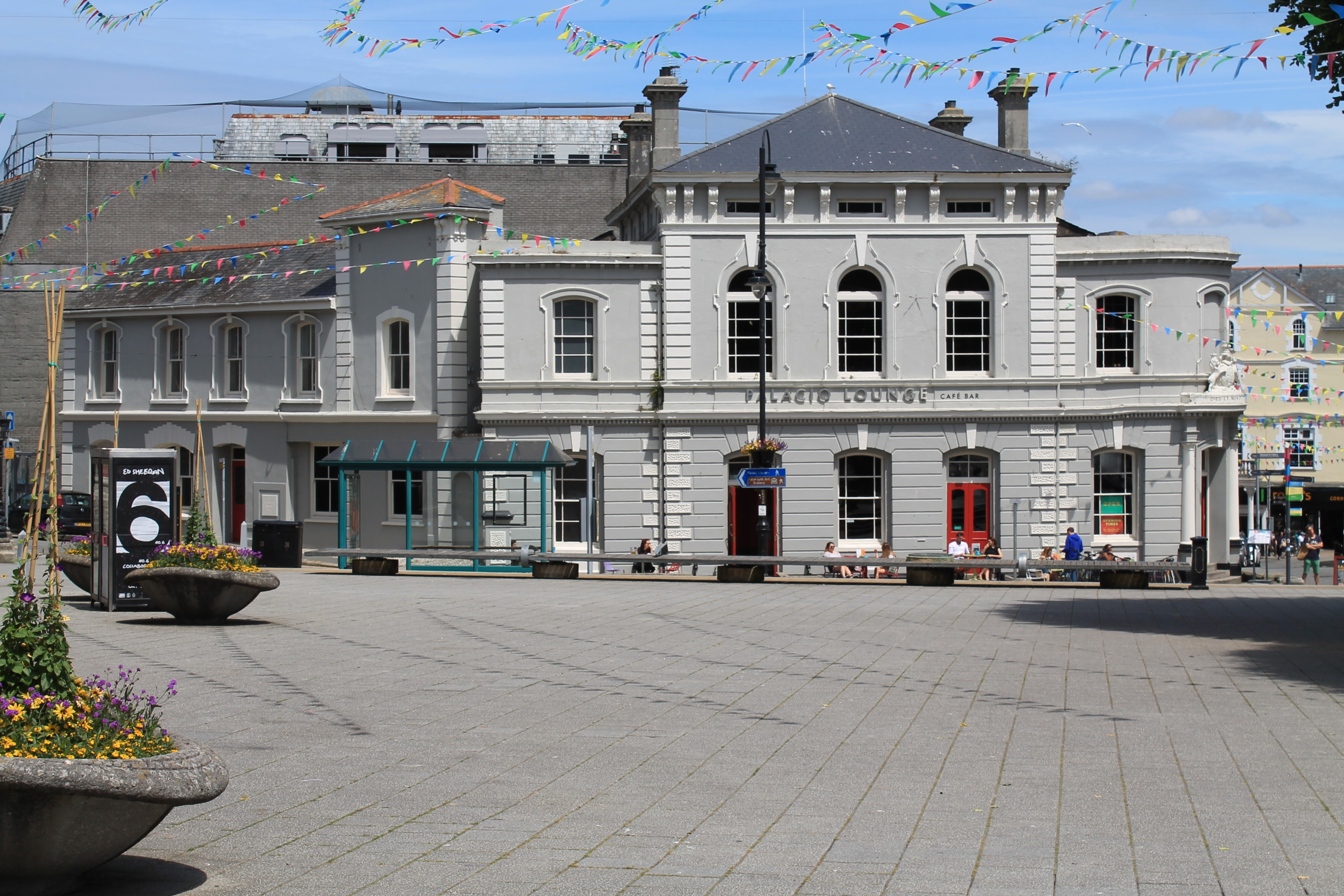
- The building in 2019

- Shown in Cornwall
- 50.1557°N 5.0720°W
- Location: The Moor, Falmouth, Cornwall, England

History
- Built: 1866

Site notes
- Architect(s): Charles Reeves and Lewis George Butcher
- Architectural style: Italianate style

Listed Building – Grade II
- Official name: Former town hall and attached former fire station
- Designated: 23 January 1973
- Reference no.: 1269980

The Palacio Lounge is a former municipal building on The Moor in Falmouth, Cornwall, a town in England. The structure, which currently operates as a restaurant and bar, is a Grade II listed building.

== History ==
The elected corporation of Falmouth was based at what is now the Old Town Hall until the mid-1860s. They then decided that they required larger premises, and so commissioned a new building on The Moor. The site they selected, on the corner of Webber Street and Killigrew Street, was formerly occupied by Allen's Brewery.

Construction work on the new building began in 1864. It was designed by Charles Reeves and Lewis George Butcher in the Italianate style, built by Olver & Sons in rubble masonry with a stucco finish at a cost of £4,000, and was completed in 1866. It was also used as a courthouse, and contained a county court office, registrar's office, high bailiff's office and apartments for judges. In 1895, the building was extended to the northwest, with the new section serving as a fire station. However, in 1896, the corporation moved to new premises in the Municipal Buildings.

The building continued to serve as the local magistrates' court until 1990. It was then converted into the Rumours nightclub, shortly thereafter, with modifications which were later described as "not particularly sympathetic". In 2015, it was restored at a cost of £600,000 and converted into a restaurant and bar named the Palacio Lounge.

The Palacio Lounge featured in the novel, Troubled Blood, in the Cormoran Strike series, written by J. K. Rowling and published under the pseudonym Robert Galbraith in 2020. Scenes for the television adaptation of the same book were filmed there and released as Strike Series 5 Troubled Blood in 2022.

== Architecture ==
The design involves a main frontage which is five bays wide and almost symmetrical, except that the rightmost bay is wider to incorporate the main entrance, designed to be viewed from Killigrew Street. The curved doorway is flanked by Tuscan columns and has a royal coat of arms in the cornice above. The ground floor is rusticated. The central section of three bays, which is slightly projected forward and features a squat attic storey, contains, at ground floor level, a segmental headed window with voussoirs and a keystone in the middle bay, and segmental headed doorways with voussoirs and keystones in the bays on either side. On the first floor, the central section is fenestrated by round headed windows with keystones and ogee-shaped hood moulds and, on the attic floor, it is fenestrated by small rectangular windows. The two-storey end bays are fenestrated by segmental headed windows on both floors. At roof level, the central section is surmounted by eaves supported by brackets, while the end bays are surmounted by modillioned cornices. The fire station section is also five bays wide and fenestrated in a similar style.

Internally, some original features survive, including many of the windows, a cantilevered stone staircase, and a canopy in the old magistrates' court. The building was grade II listed in 1973.
