= Nicholas Middleton =

English artist

- Born: London, England
- Education: Winchester School of Art
- Occupations: Artist, Painter
- Known for: John Moores Painting Prize
- Website: Nicholas Middleton Official

Nicholas Middleton (born 1975 in London, England) is an English artist. He studied at the London Guildhall University 1993. In 1994, at the Winchester School of Art where he was awarded a BA Honours Fine Art in 1997. In 2006 he was the Visitors' Choice prizewinner at John Moores Painting Prize 24 and in 2010 Middleton was a Prizewinner and the Visitors' Choice Award prizewinner at John Moores Painting Prize 2010. His paintings are "primarily influenced by the experience of the urban environment as a visual arena where unexpected juxtapositions occur". He is a member of Contemporary British Painting.

== John Moores Painting Prize ==
Middleton has been selected for the John Moores Painting Prize on six occasions. In 2006 Middleton was the Visitors' Choice Award winner at John Moores Painting Prize 24 with a black and white photorealist painting "Scene from a Contemporary Novel" (oil on canvas, 101 x 234 cm). In 2010 he was a Prizewinner and Visitors' Choice Award prizewinner with "Protest, 1st April 2009" (oil on canvas, 117 x 203 cm) a photorealist black and white painting of a demonstration outside the Bank of England. In 2016 Middleton's work "Figures in an Arch" was long-listed for the John Moores Painting Prize 2016.

== Selected collections ==
- Abbot Hall Art Gallery
- China Academy of Art, Hangzhou,
- The East Contemporary Art Collection
- Falmouth Art Gallery
- The Priseman Seabrook Collection of 21st Century British Painting

== Selected exhibitions ==
2016 - John Moores Painting Prize 2016, Walker Art Gallery, Liverpool

2014 - John Moores Painting Prize 2014, Walker Art Gallery, Liverpool

2014 - Contemporary British Painting:The Priseman Seabrook Collection, Huddersfield Art Gallery, England

2014 - Towards a New Socio-Painting, Transition Gallery, London

2012 - Francis Bacon to Paula Rego, Abbot Hall Gallery, Kendal, England

2010 - John Moores 2010, Walker Art Gallery, Liverpool

2008 - Royal Academy Summer Exhibition, London

2007 - Royal Academy Summer Exhibition, London

2006 - John Moores 24, Walker Art Gallery, Liverpool

2004 - John Moores 23, Walker Art Gallery Liverpool
