= Sir Samuel Hannay, 3rd Baronet =

Sir Samuel Hannay, 3rd Baronet (c. 1732 – 11 December 1790) was an English politician who served as Member of Parliament for Camelford between 5 July 1784 and 11 December 1790. He was bound apprentice to Alexander Johnson, citizen and salter 22 December 1746 and made free 21 February 1754, so the commonly given birth date of c. 1742 cannot be correct. He is buried in St Marylebone Parish Church, London.

Parliament of Great Britain
Preceded by Jonathan Phillips; James Macpherson	Member of Parliament for Camelford; 1784–1790; With: James Macpherson	Succeeded by William Smith; James Macpherson
Baronetage of Nova Scotia
Preceded by Robert Hannay	Baronet (of Mochrum); 1783–1790	Succeeded by Samuel Hannay
