= Old Town Hall, Falmouth =

Municipal building in Falmouth, Cornwall, England

Old Town Hall
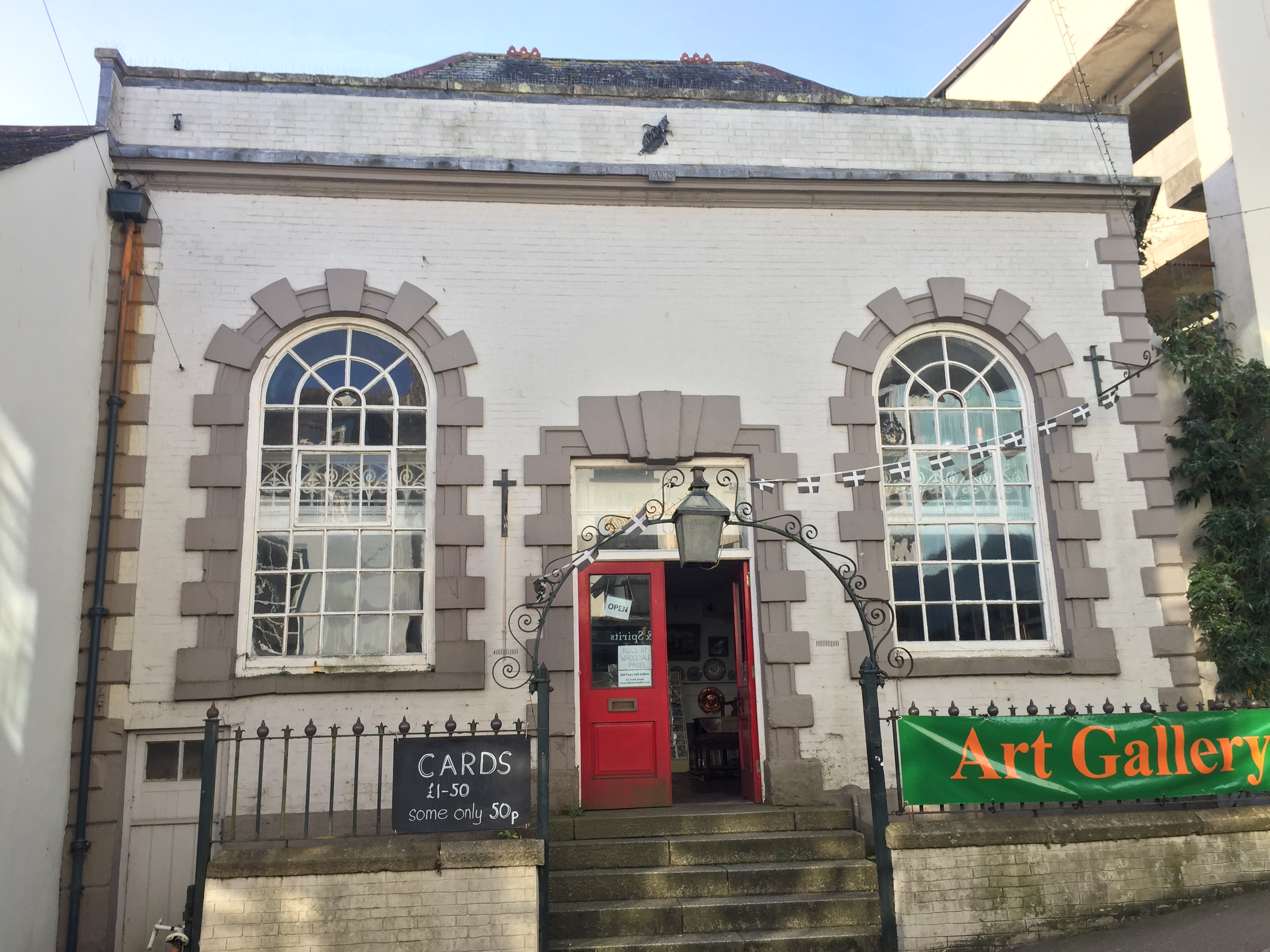
- The building in 2017

- Shown in Cornwall
- 50.1574°N 5.0728°W
- Location: High Street, Falmouth, Cornwall

History
- Built: 1710

Site notes
- Architectural style: Queen Anne style

Listed Building – Grade II*
- Official name: The Old Town Hall
- Designated: 9 September 1968
- Reference no.: 1270068

The Old Town Hall is a historic building in the High Street in Falmouth, Cornwall, a town in England. The structure, which accommodates a small art gallery, is a Grade II* listed building.

== History ==
The building was commissioned as a Congregational chapel probably around 1700. It was designed in the Queen Anne style, built in brick, and was completed in around 1710. It is one of the oldest surviving non-conformist chapels in Cornwall, with only the Marazion Quaker Meeting House being older, and the one in Kea being of similar date.

In 1715, a new, larger chapel was constructed, and the old building was acquired by the lord of the manor, Martin Lister Killigrew of Arwenack Manor. He presented it to the people of Falmouth, together with two ceremonial maces, in 1725, and the local corporation then used it as a town hall. It was also used as a courthouse, accommodating both the assizes and the County Court. Following the implementation of the Municipal Corporations Act 1835, the mayor, aldermen and burgesses of Falmouth were replaced by an elected council which met in the town hall to discuss issues such as the response to the cholera pandemic of September 1849. The responses included whitewashing the town hall and altering the diet of patients being treated there.

In 1866 the corporation moved to larger premises on The Moor, now the Palacio Lounge, and the old town hall was sold to the Odd Fellows. However, it continued to be used for judicial purposes: in 1884, it was the venue for the initial hearing, before magistrates, of the case of R v Dudley and Stephens, the trial of two sailors accused of cannibalism, having eaten the cabin boy when marooned at sea on the yacht, the Mignonette. The magistrates at Falmouth referred the matter to the assizes at Exeter and the sailors were eventually sentenced to 6 months in prison.

In 1948, the Odd Fellows sold the hall, which was converted into an antiques shop in 1986, and which, since June 2015, has served as an art gallery. Significant works of art in the gallery include a painting by the local artist, John Opie, depicting a beggar boy.

== Architecture ==
The building is constructed of painted brick, with the quoins and the Gibbs surrounds finished in a rusticated stucco style. The design involves a symmetrical main frontage of three bays facing the High Street. The central bay features a short flight of steps leading up to a doorway with a fanlight and a Gibbs surround. The outer bays are fenestrated by round headed windows, also with Gibbs surrounds. At roof level, there is a cornice and a parapet. Internally, the building is two rooms deep. Inside, there is a decorative plaster ceiling, 18th-century dado panelling, and a staircase with reused 18th century elements. The building was grade II* listed in 1968.

== See also ==
- Grade II* listed buildings in Cornwall (Q–Z)
