= Harry Ousey =

British painter

Frederick Henry Ousey (1915–1985) was a British post-modernist painter whose work has been described as "very important in the 20th century British art scene", and exhibited across Europe.

== Early life ==
Ousey was born in Longsight, Manchester, on 21 November 1915. He trained as an architect.

== Life and works ==
He moved to Cornwall where he became associated with Ben Nicholson and Barbara Hepworth. A collection of 25 paintings is owned and exhibited by the Falmouth Art Gallery, Cornwall, who rate his work "amongst the finest in abstract paintings emanating from the St Ives School" Ousey was working towards a major show in Paris at the time of his death in 1985. A retrospective, "One Needs More Than Paint, A Centenary Exhibition of Harry Ousey", was held at Salford Art Gallery in June 2015.
