= Nerys Johnson =

Welsh artist and art curator

Nerys Ann Johnson (5 October 1942 – 12 June 2001) was a Welsh artist and art curator.

== Early life and education ==
Johnson was born at Colwyn Bay, Denbighshire, and raised in Mansfield, Nottinghamshire, the daughter of Howard and May Johnson. She spent much of her childhood in the hospital with complications from rheumatoid arthritis, a lifelong condition. She studied painting and art history at Kings College, Durham University.

== Career ==
Johnson was Keeper of Fine Arts the Laing Art Gallery in Newcastle-upon-Tyne from 1967, and "keeper in charge" at the Durham Light Infantry Museum and Arts Centre from 1970 to 1989. In both sites, she curated exhibitions that critic Julian Spalding recalled as "fresh and original."

In retirement after 1989, she concentrated on her own art, often with very colorful floral subjects, and had several solo exhibitions.

Johnson's arthritis affected her art. As her impairment progressed, she painted on smaller canvases, to accommodate her reduced range of motion. "I am appalled when people see my painting as a hobby, and comment how relaxing it must be," she explained in 2000. "If they just knew how it takes every ounce of energy I've got, every atom of concentration."

She died in 2001, age 58. The Nerys Johnson Contemporary Art Fund is supported by the sale of her works, and makes grants to public galleries to purchase work by living artists. In 2011, the National Museum of Wales opened an exhibit of Johnson's works, to mark the tenth anniversary of her death. Another posthumous show was mounted in 2014, at the Martin Tinney Gallery in Cardiff.
