= John R. Hanny =

American chef

John R. Hanny is a United States chef, author, and political operative and is best known for working in the White House during the presidencies of John F. Kennedy and Lyndon B. Johnson as a special consultant and for serving as a visiting chef for administrations from Richard Nixon to Bill Clinton.

Hanny compiled recipes from Theodore Roosevelt to Barack Obama and wrote the cookbook Secrets from the White House Kitchens (2010).

Hanny is author of the political thriller Asleep at the Wheel (2002), which sold 500,000 copies worldwide.
