= James Ballantyne Hannay =

Scottish chemist (1855–1931)

James Ballantyne Hannay FRSE (1855–1931) was a Scottish chemist who believed he had synthesized diamond in 1880. However, modern testing showed that the surviving samples from his experiments were natural diamond, not synthetic. While his techniques were conducive to diamond formation, modern diamond production – not achieved until the 1950s – requires capabilities not available in Hannay's time. Hannay was also known for making precision instruments.

== Life ==
James Ballantyne Hannay was born at 22 Monteith Row in Glasgow on New Year's Day, 1855. His father was Alexander Hannay, tool-maker, who owned property in Helensburgh and who was the proprietor of the Prince of Wales Theatre, later rebuilt as the Grand Theatre, in Cowcaddens, Glasgow. James Hannay became a chemist and was a prolific innovator. He published several scientific papers and took out over 70 patents in Britain, Europe and the USA. He also formed his own patents company in Glasgow. His most controversial scientific work, which was also his best known, related to his claim, made in 1880, that he had successfully synthesised diamonds. These claims have been investigated by a number of scientists including Sir Robert Robertson, (1869–1949) the first person to establish that two types of natural diamond existed, who took a great personal interest in them.

In 1876 he was elected a Fellow of the Royal Society of Edinburgh. His proposers were Thomas Edward Thorpe, William Dittmar, William Thomson, Lord Kelvin and Alexander Crum Brown.

In the later years of his life Hannay turned away from scientific investigation and moved his attention to examining aspects of the origin and development of religion and published a number of works critical of the Hebrew Scriptures. James Ballantyne Hannay died in 1931.

A collection of archives relating to Hannay was collected by Sir Robert Robertson. These were given to the University of Dundee by Sir Robert's son, Robert H. S. Robertson, who himself carried out much research into the life and career of James Hannay. These records are now held by the university's Archive Services. The university also holds the archives of his father Alexander Hannay.
