= Hannay baronets =

Extinct baronetcy in the Baronetage of Nova Scotia

- Escutcheon of the Hannay baronets of Mochrum
- Creation date: 1630
- Status: extinct
- Motto: Per ardua ad alta, Through difficulties to heights

The Hannay Baronetcy, of Mochrum in the Stewardry of Kirkcudbright, was a title in the Baronetage of Nova Scotia. It was created on 31 March 1630 for Robert Hannay. The title became dormant on the death of the second Baronet in 1689. The title was claimed in 1783 by Samuel Hannay, the third Baronet. He sat as Member of Parliament for Camelford. His son, the fourth Baronet, was in the service of the Emperor of Austria. He was unmarried and the baronetcy again became dormant on his death in 1842.

== Hannay baronets, of Mochrum (1630) ==
- Sir Robert Hannay, 1st Baronet (1598–1658)

Sir Robert Hannay of Mochrum, 1st Bt. was born circa 1598. He was the son of Alexander Hannay of Sorbie. He married Jane Stewart. He died on 8 January 1657/58 at Dublin, County Dublin, Ireland. He was buried on 24 January 1657/58 at Dublin, County Dublin, Ireland. He died intestate and his estate was administered to his son, Sir Robert Hannay on 29 November 1658. He held the office of Clerk of the Nichells [Ireland] between 19 October 1629 and 30 May 1639. He was created 1st Baronet Hannay, of Mochrum, co. Kirkcudbright [Nova Scotia] on 31 March 1630, with a special remainder to his heirs male.

- Sir Robert Hannay, 2nd Baronet (died 1689) (dormant)

Sir Robert Hannay of Mochrum, 2nd Bt. was the son of Sir Robert Hannay of Mochrum, 1st Bt. and Jane Stewart.mHe died on 30 April 1689 at Dublin, County Dublin, Ireland, without issue. He was buried at St. Michael's Church, Dublin, County Dublin, Ireland. He succeeded to the title of 2nd Baronet Hannay, of Mochrum, co. Kirkcudbright [N.S., 1630] on 8 January 1657/58. He gained the rank of Captain of Foot in 1661. On his death, his baronetcy became dormant for nearly 100 years. ...

- Sir Samuel Hannay, 3rd Baronet (1742–1790) (claimed 1783)
- Sir Samuel Hannay, 4th Baronet (1772–1842) (dormant)

== See also ==
- Clan Hannay
