= Alfred Aaron de Pass =

South African businessman and philanthropist

Alfred Aaron de Pass (2 July 1861 – 9th December 1952) was a South African businessman, art-collector and philanthropist.

De Pass was born in Cape Town into a prominent family of Sephardic Jewish merchants from London who had settled in Cape Town. Their original surname, Shalom, was translated to the Spanish word for peace and became Paz before being anglicised to Pass in England. He was descended from Elias de Paz, who was among the original 12 Jewish brokers admitted to the privileges of the Royal Exchange in 1697. His father, Daniel de Pass (1838–1921), followed his own father and uncle to the Cape Colony, where the family were the largest ship owners in Cape Town and controlled a vast guano enterprise, as well as copper mining and salted fish .

In 1867, Alfred de Pass was taken to England by his father. He was educated in Ramsgate, in Gottingen Germany, and at the Royal School of Mines. He lived in the Colony of Natal in 1879–84, where his father Daniel had a sugar estate and introduced a valuable strain of sugar that was disease-resistant, in several histories of South Africa it is noted that Daniel de Pass saved the sugar industry in the Cape through his inventive approach with mechanising production as well as the introduction of the 'Uba' variety of sugar which his son Alfred helped with but did not initiate (family information).

Alfred invested a considerable amount of his personal fortune in art. (The moneyinvested was earned through the lifetime work of two previous generations of his family, his father Daniel and his grandfather Aaron, in trading activities in the Cape). Much of the art he bought, he gave to galleries and museums in England and Cape Town, usually in memory of someone in his family who had died, but also to help build signifiant art collections for exposure to the public in regions of England and South Africa which were important to him. He gave more pictures to the National Gallery of Art in Cape Town than to anywhere else, several hundred paintings under an agreement with them to provide the foundation for their Art Gallery in Cape Town in 1925. He also gave to Falmouth, Bristol, Cambridge, Plymouth Leicester and Truro museum, as well as to the National Portrait Gallery, the British Museum and to the Tate as well as very significantly to Cape Town. He had a special personal relationship with Falmouth, regarding it as his home at times in his life, along side his deep roots in Cape Town.

His donations to Falmouth now constitute the core of the Falmouth Art Gallery.

Cape Town donations number over 250 and feature significant British and international works mainly from the 18th and 19th century. National Gallery of South Africa, now known as Iziko.

Between 1927 - 1952 Alfred donated to the refurbishment of Groot Constantia in the Cape after a fire in 1925, giving funds to the South African Government and sourcing antiques and paintings. He bought all the furniture, pictures and china, researching and obtaining the right period of furniture for the period wine estate to make it a significant museum which is still there today. Groot Constantia is one of the earliest wine estates in the Cape dating back to the 1600's.https://grootconstantia.co.za/groot-constantia-rich-history/

Alfred died in Cape Town where he was living at the time in 1952. He was married to Ethel Phoebe De Pass, née Salaman (1869–1910). and after Ethel died he married twice more. He had five children.
