= Simon Burton (artist) =

British painter

- Born: Yorkshire, England
- Education: University of Brighton Royal College of Art
- Occupation: Artist
- Website: Simon Burton Official

Simon Burton was born in Yorkshire, England in 1973 and received a first class bachelor's degree at the University of Brighton in 1995, before completing his MA in 1997 at the Royal College of Art. Described by Lucian Freud in 1997 as, "the most promising young artist in Britain today," Burton received the Birtle prize for painting (1995), a travel award to ARCO studios in Lisbon, Portugal (1996), The John Minton Travel award (1996), The Jenny Hall Scholarship (1996) and worked in the USA under the patronage of Robert and Susan Kasen-Summer (1997-1998).

Burton's work is described as "figurative painting that treads a line between classical, abstraction and magic realism" being "heavily layered both physically and with art historical references".

== Selected solo exhibitions ==
- 2013 – One year later, York College Gallery, York, England
- 2012 – Between Cave and Gate, ARTARY Gallery, Stuttgart
- 2011 –Nowhere Men, Arch 402 Gallery, London
- 2010 – Black Swan, Blue Woman, Huddersfield Museum
- 2007 – Under the Sign of Saturn Kookmin Gallery, Seoul

== Selected group exhibitions ==
- 2017 – Towards Night, Towner Art Gallery, Eastbourne, UK
- 2016 – Paper Cuts, Transition Gallery, London
- 2016 – March, James Freeman Gallery, London
- 2016 – Selected works from the Priseman Seabrook Collection, The Minories Art Gallery, Colchester, England
- 2015 – Contemporary British Drawing, Xi'an Academy of Fine Arts, China
- 2015 – Neiland's Choice, GX Gallery, London
- 2014 – Opinion Makers 2, Curated by Lubomirov-Easton, Londonewcastle Project Space, London
- 2014 – Enclosures, Elsewhere at the Lion and Lamb Gallery
- 2014 – Some of My Colours at the Eagle Gallery
- 2014 – About Face Swindon Museum and Art Gallery
- 2011 – A Sort of Night to the Mind, ARTARY Gallery, Stuttgart

== Selected collections ==
- The Aldrich Collection, University of Brighton, England
- The Louis-Dreyfus Collection, USA
- Falmouth Art Gallery, England
- The Priseman Seabrook Collection, UK
- Swindon Museum and Art Gallery, England
- Royal College of Art, London
