= Huddersfield Art Gallery =

Library and art gallery in Huddersfield, England

Coordinates: 53.6445°N 1.7815°W

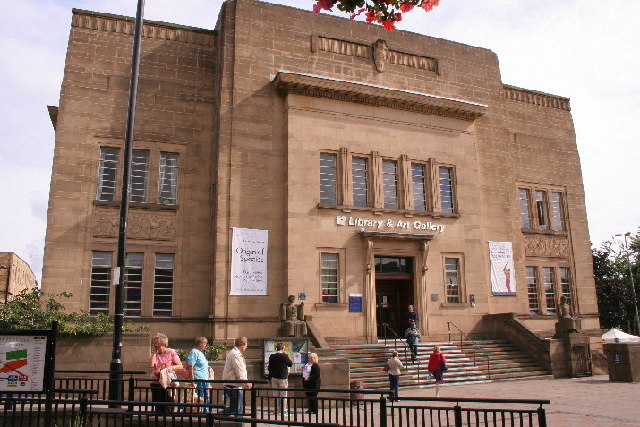
Huddersfield Library and Art Gallery building (August 2005)

The Huddersfield Art Gallery is an art gallery in Huddersfield, West Yorkshire, northern England. It is currently owned and operated by Kirklees Council.

== History ==
Huddersfield Art Gallery was opened on the 22nd April, 1898, by Lady Gwendolen Ramsden. The building pictured was built in 1937 and opened as a library and art gallery in 1940. The gallery closed in 2020 in anticipation of major redevelopments in the town centre and the creation of a Cultural Heart which will include the provision of a new art gallery.

== Collections ==
The gallery holds over 700 paintings by predominantly British artists from the 19th century to the present day including works by L. S. Lowry, Ian Mckeever, Simon Burton, Robert Priseman, William Orpen, John Atkinson Grimshaw, Philip Wilson Steer, John Bratby, Frank Auerbach, David Tindle, Terry Frost, Lucien Pissarro, John Keith Vaughan, Joan Eardley, Roger Hilton, John Bellany, Chris Gollon, Graham Sutherland, Walter Richard Sickert, Roger Fry, Henry Scott Tuke, Julian Trevelyan, Ivon Hitchens and Henry Moore, as well as by many notable local artists.

Its permanent collection includes a Francis Bacon painting, Figure Study II, the first Bacon work to enter a public art gallery in the UK. It was purchased by the Contemporary Art Society and donated to Bagshaw Museum in Batley in 1952, after being rejected by the Tate Gallery which, at the time, did not consider Bacon to be an important artist. It was transferred to Huddersfield with the creation of Kirklees Council in 1974. In 2016, it was reported that the council were looking into selling the painting which, with an estimated value of between £19.5 million and £60 million, it considered "too valuable to be exhibited locally". They later conceded that the conditions of the Contemporary Art Society's donation meant that the work could not be sold. Although frequently on loan to other institutions, a council spokesman clarified that it is otherwise on public display in the Huddersfield Art Gallery.

In addition to the painting collection curators have developed a craft collection with a special focus on ceramics by the Yorkshire potters. There are an additional number of smaller collections of jewellery, textiles and carved wood as well as a Japanese print collection. Works from the permanent collection are featured in a series of themed exhibitions throughout the year.

== Exhibitions ==
Huddersfield Art Gallery has hosted the New Light art prize which focuses on artists from the north of England and annually hosts the Contemporary British Painting Prize which is a national prize for painters who practice in the UK.

In 2014 the gallery became the first public venue to display The Priseman Seabrook Collection of 21st Century British painting.

== See also ==
- Listed buildings in Huddersfield (Newsome Ward - central area)
