= Mary Webb (artist) =

British painter

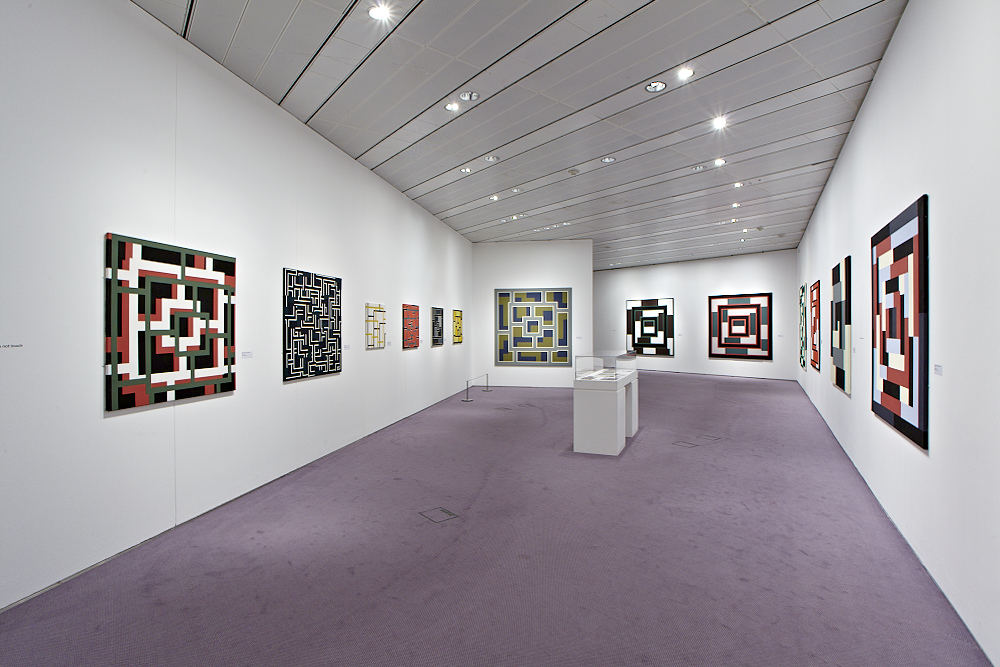
- Mary Webb exhibition installation shot at The Sainsbury Centre for Visual Arts, 2011.
- Born: 1939 (age 86–87); London, England
- Education: Newcastle University, England; Chelsea School of Art, London
- Occupation: Artist
- Website: www.marywebb.co.uk

Mary Webb (born 1939) is a British abstract artist.

== Biography ==
Webb was born in London in 1939. She studied Fine Art at Newcastle University under British artists Richard Hamilton and Victor Pasmore from 1958 to 1963. She went on to study at the Chelsea College of Arts, London and taught painting at the Norwich School of Art and Harrogate School of Art. Webb met Sonia Delaunay in Paris during the 1960s and cites her as an influence.

Webb's paintings and prints are consistently square in shape and exist as an arrangement of vivid squares and rectangles. Her work is held by several public art collections, including the Arts Council Collection, Sainsbury Centre (UEA), Kettle's Yard, and The Sonia Delaunay Collection (Paris). A one-person survey show of her work was held at the Sainsbury Centre for Visual Arts in 2011 which then toured to the Hatton Gallery, Newcastle University in 2012. Titled ‘Mary Webb: Journeys in Colour’, it contained more than 60 paintings, along with screen prints, drawings and collages including a series of paintings that were inspired by time she spent in Utah.

== Exhibitions ==
- 2011 - Journeys In Colour, Sainsbury Centre for Visual Arts, University of East Anglia, Norwich, England
- 2012 - Journeys In Colour, Hatton Gallery, Newcastle University, England
- 2013 - East Contemporary Art; A Collection of 21st Century Practice, UCS Waterfront Gallery, Ipswich, England
- 2013 - 2013 Women Collectors, Women Artists, Lloyds Club, London
- 2015 - Small is Beautiful: Flowers Gallery, London
- 2018 - Visible Women, Norwich Castle Museum, Norwich, UK
- 2018 - Reverie, Hales Gallery, London, UK

== Publications ==
- Grieve, A & Clark, M (2011) Mary Webb: Journeys in Colour. Norwich, University of East Anglia: Sainsbury Centre for Visual Arts
