= Madison Museum of Fine Art =

- Established: 2005
- Location: 300 Hancock Street, Madison, Georgia, GA 30650, United States
- Coordinates: 33.588038°N 83.472368°W
- Type: Art museum, sculpture garden
- Director: Michele L. Bechtell
- Website: http://www.mmofa.org/

The Madison Museum of Fine Art (MMoFA) is located on the town square of Madison, Georgia, USA. The museum is a member of the American Alliance of Museums.

Founded in 2005 by Michele L. Bechtell, the MMoFA is an art history museum with interior galleries, an outdoor sculpture garden, a continuous film corner, and a museum shop. Galleries display original works by American and European artists including Pablo Picasso, Salvador Dalí, Marguerite Horner, James Abbott McNeill Whistler, Marc Chagall, Charles Ethan Porter, Stephen Newton, Robert Priseman, Julie Umerle, James Dodds, Linda Ingham, Joseph Leyendecker and Alexander Calder. From the African tradition, there are hand-carved stone sculptures created by the first generation founding fathers of the Shona sculpture movement in Zimbabwe.

The museum organizes lectures, film, temporary exhibitions, and special events. It also dedicates significant resources to K-12 interdisciplinary visual art history, including an annual student-curated exhibition of selected works from the museum collection, an art/maths festival, an art/science festival and a visual art and poetry collage festival.

MMoFA is a Blue Star Museum that offers free admission to military families. It routinely participates in the annual Smithsonian magazine Museum Day, and it is a registered host for the international Slow Art Day.
