= Rugby Art Gallery and Museum =

Art gallery and museum in Warwickshire, England

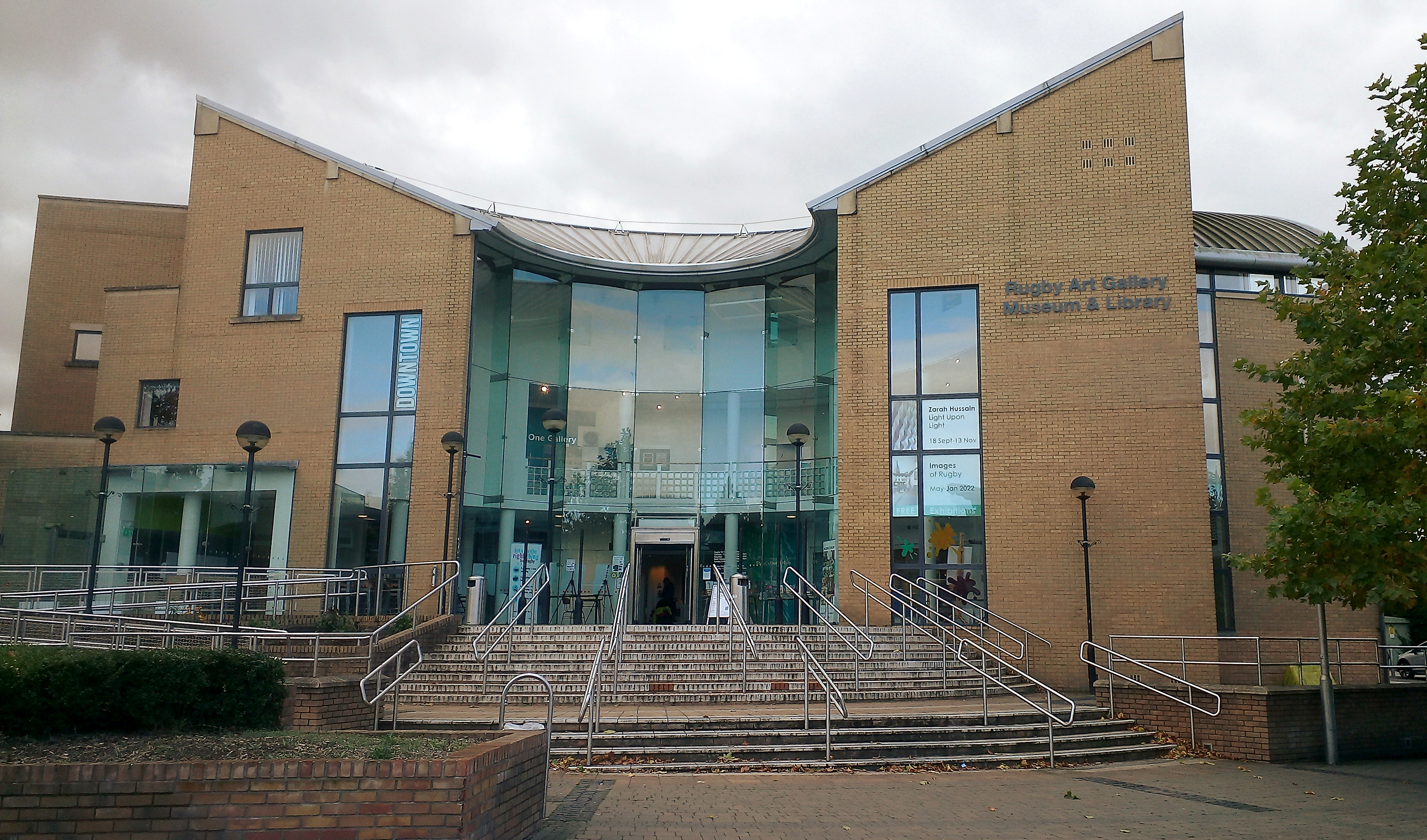
- Rugby Art Gallery, Museum and Library in 2021
- Interactive map of the Rugby Art Gallery and Museum area

General information
- Location: Little Elborow Street, CV21 3BZ, Rugby, Warwickshire, United Kingdom
- Coordinates: 52.3717°N 1.2645°W
- Opened: 2000

Design and construction
- Architecture firm: CPMG Architects

Website
- www.ragm.co.uk

The Rugby Art Gallery and Museum is a combined art gallery and museum in central Rugby, Warwickshire, in England. The purpose-built building housing it is shared with Rugby library; it was opened in 2000 and was built in the place of Rugby's previous library.

== Collections ==
The art gallery holds "The Rugby Collection", over 170 items of 20th century and contemporary British art, including prints, drawings and paintings by artists such as L. S. Lowry, Stanley Spencer, Paula Rego and Graham Sutherland. The collection was built up by Rugby Borough Council from 1946 onwards and still collects "works by British artists of 'promise and renown' ". There is also a "Local Art Collection".

The museum hosts a collection of Roman artefacts, excavated from the nearby Roman town of Tripontium. It also has a display of the social and industrial history of Rugby, and the "Redding Collection" of some 25,000 mid-20th-century photographic negatives taken at the Rugby photographic studio of George Redding. In December 2006, the Rugby World Cup was exhibited at the museum.

The facility became the permanent physical home of the World Rugby Hall of Fame in November 2016. However this was closed in 2021, due to financial pressures on the local council, and lower than expected visitor numbers.

The building also houses the town's visitor centre.

As part of a national venture called Get it Loud in Libraries, the building has played host to gigs of various music artists such as Plan B and British Sea Power.

== Recent Exhibitions ==
- Rugby's Coronations, 26 April - 23 September 2023
- Join our Club, 1 October to 23 September 2023
- David Remfry RA: We think the World of You. People and Dogs Drawn Together, 11 Feb - 3 June 2023
- David Remfry RA Selects: The Rugby Collection, 11 Feb - 3 June 2023
- The Rugby Open Exhibition, 3 December - 4 February 2022
- ARTIST ROOMS: Louise Bourgeois, 23 July - 19 November 2022
- The Ipcress Style - costumes from the ITV drama, 14 May - 9 July 2022
- Every Object Tells A Story, 2 February to 16 September 2022
- Body en Thrall, 12 February- 23 April 2022
- Brick by Brick, 27 November - 22 January 2022

== See also ==
- Webb Ellis Rugby Football Museum, also in Rugby.
