= Cab Gallery =

1999–2001 art project

TAXY
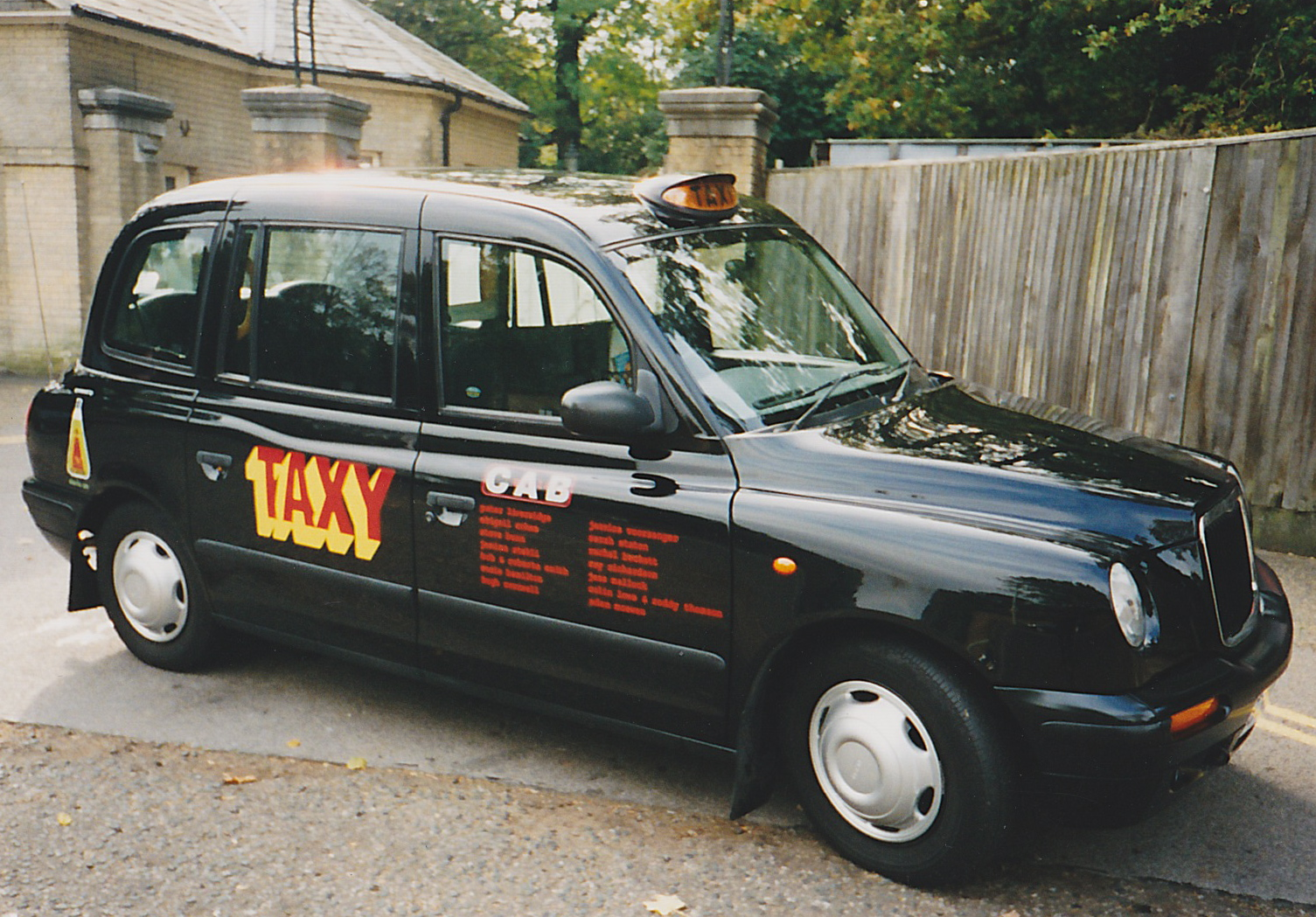
- Cab Gallery with first exterior, TAXY
- Artist: Bob and Roberta Smith
- Year: 1999
- Medium: Red and yellow vinyl
- Location: London, England

Cab Gallery was an art project from 1999 to 2001 curated by London art dealer Paul Stolper of Paul Stolper Gallery and art collector and London taxi driver Jason Brown. The concept was for art to be exhibited on the outside and inside of a working London taxi rather than a traditional gallery space. As stated by Brown, "It was important to me that when working, the artwork was incidental to the journey of the passenger. I hoped they would notice but it was part of their environment and unexpected. It was also interesting to me to learn which artworks they reacted to. But it had to be a natural discovery."

Artists were provided the views and dimensions of the available spaces such as the bottom of fold-up seats (or "tip-up seats"), the exterior of the cab, and limited inside options for free-standing work. Because the cab was also a working London taxi, after each artwork was selected by the curators, approval from the Cab Advertising Committee of the Public Carriage Office was also required. Artwork placed on the exterior of the cab was printed in vinyl the same as per usual advertising procedures. Special receipts were designed, listing participating artists and contact details. In addition to serving as gallery space during working cab hours, Cab Gallery would park outside galleries on their opening nights enabling the artists to exhibit more ambitious and experimental installation and sound pieces.

Throughout the project Brown honored his commitment to the project's concept of never bringing attention to the art while operating as a working cab but rather allowing the passengers to discover it for themselves. When the cab was serving as a stationary exhibition space at art galleries and events, however, Brown would often act as de facto docent for the collection.

== History ==
In 1999, Brown approached Stolper with the idea of exhibiting art in the spaces reserved for advertising in his traditional London Black Taxi, and Cab Gallery was launched in Hoxton Square on 24 September 1999.

The first exterior was a text piece by Bob and Roberta Smith, Taxy in red and yellow vinyl. On the fold-up seats were two text pieces by Peter Liversidge, who became a regular contributor to the project and whose collected proposals were later published in book form. Also on display at the launch were All the animals, an embroidered cushion by Abigail Cohen, from Swiss Cottage to Soho and back, a book of drawings by Susie Hamilton, and Cab Gallery Greeting, a sound piece by Jessica Voorsanger. Absinthe was served out of the rear boot of the taxi.

The success of the launch led to other artists becoming involved and invitations by galleries and art event organizers to participate in their openings. On these occasions, the Cab was parked outside the entrance and artists had the opportunity to create more ambitious artworks as installations and sound pieces.

In mid-2000, the Bob and Roberta Smith exterior artwork was replaced with Sunny by Alex Katz, the American figurative painter. The popularity of the project spread through wide media coverage and Cab Gallery participated in its first show outside London at the Ikon Gallery in Birmingham. This was soon followed by From Space Gallery in Manchester and in 2001 the Aspex Gallery in Portsmouth. In 2001 the final exterior of the cab became Out from Under by important American conceptual artist Lawrence Weiner. The project expanded to include a website featuring a project by Layla Curtis which traced the routes made by Brown in his cab over a specific week.

The project came to feature regular new pieces by Peter Liversidge, the "house artist," as well as new artists and artwork to keep the project fresh. By the end of 2001 after media coverage as wide ranging as the magazines Top Gear, The Art News and Art in America and daily papers from Finland to Australia it was felt that the project should end at its height.

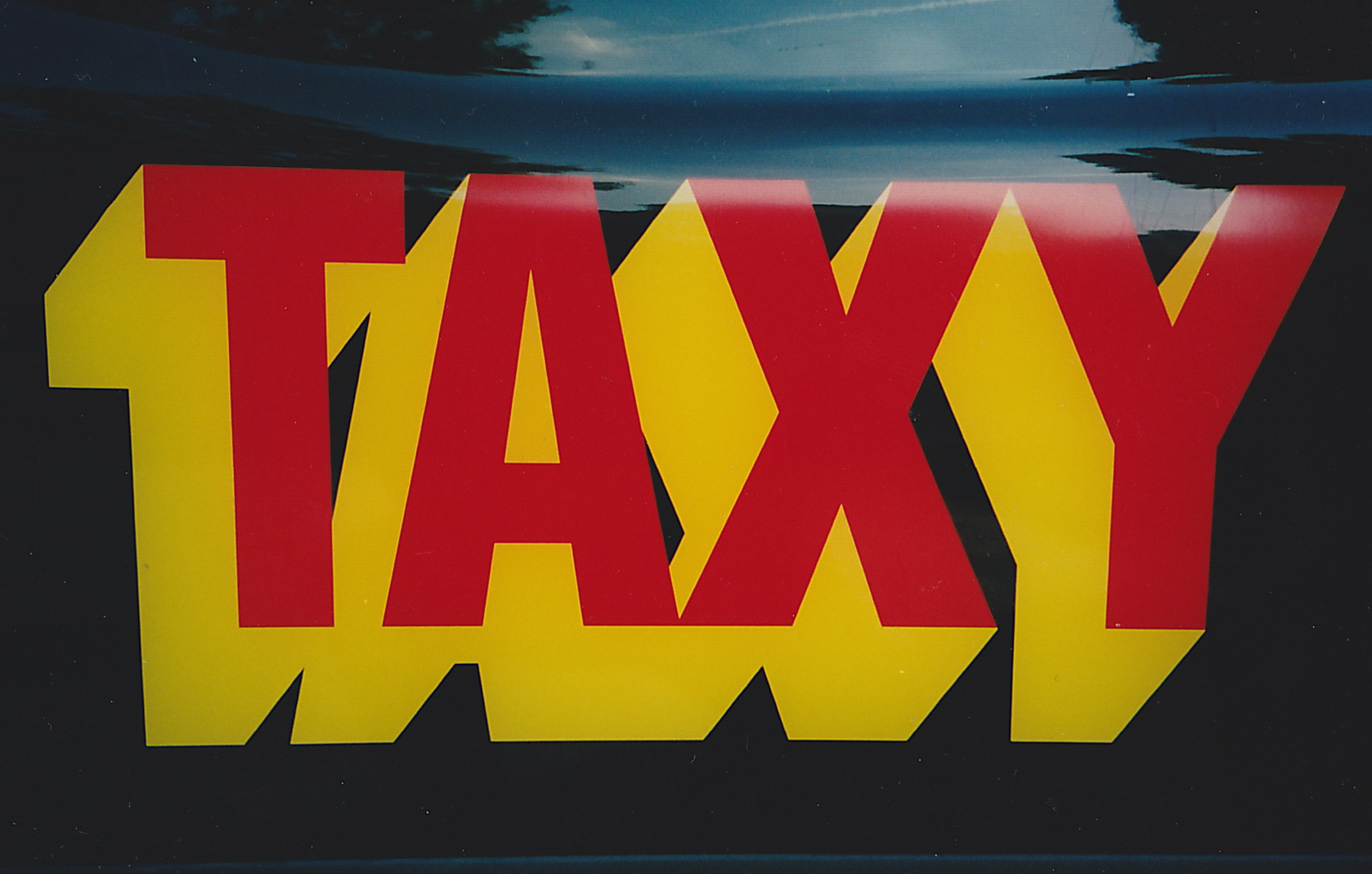
TAXY (detail) by Bob and Roberta Smith

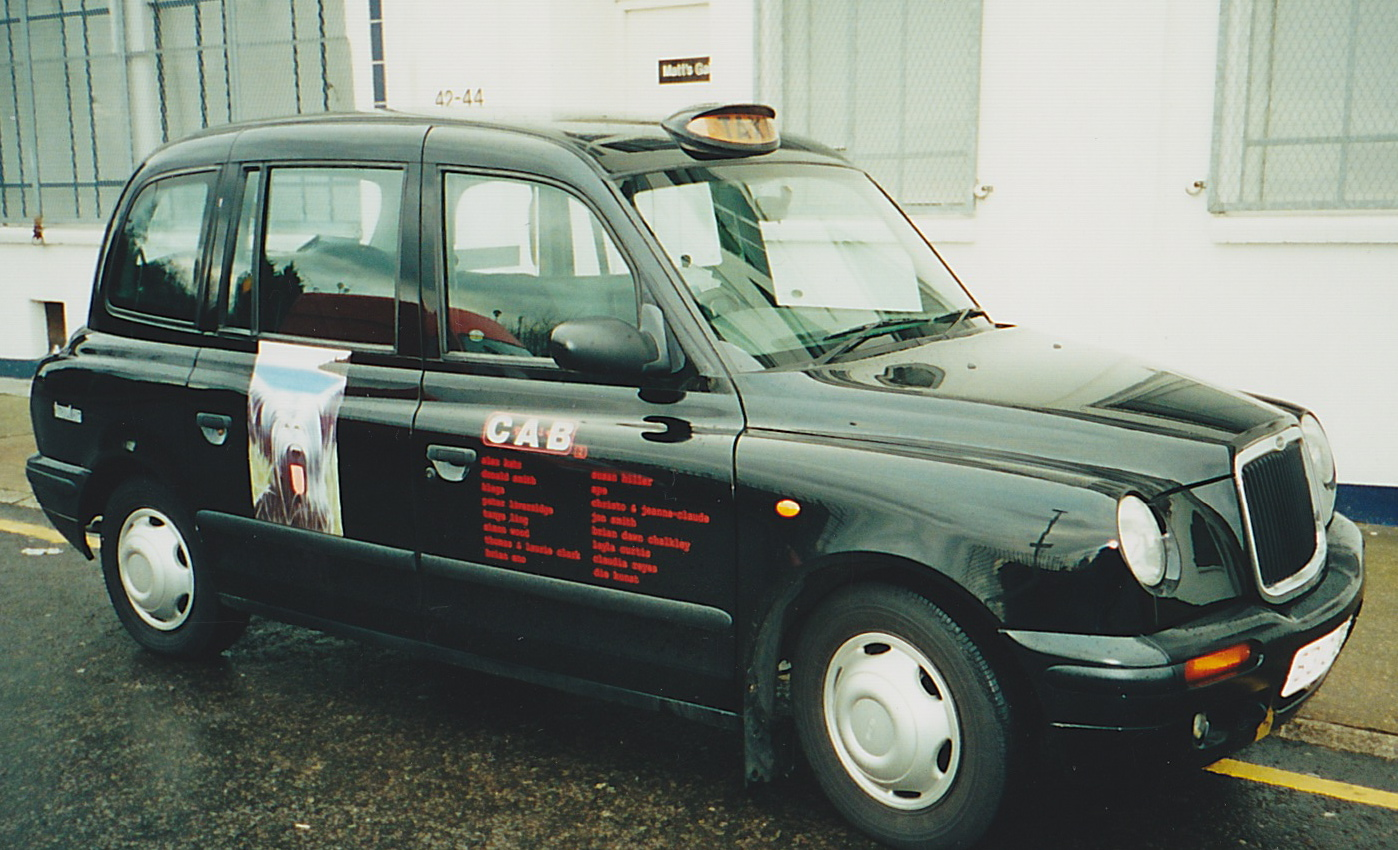
Sunny by Alex Katz

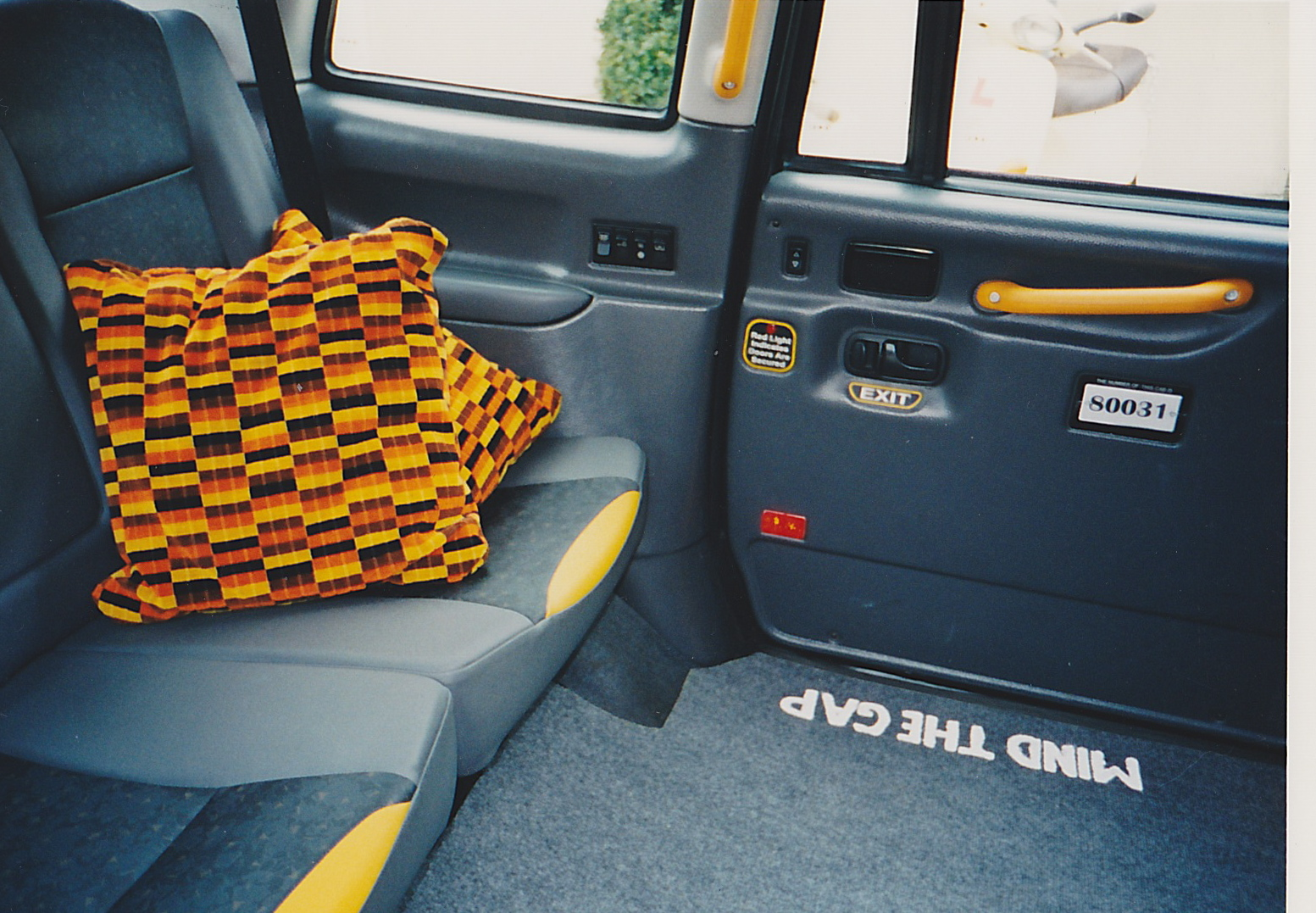
Home (cushions) by Rachel Beckett and Mind The Gap (mat) by Peter Liversidge

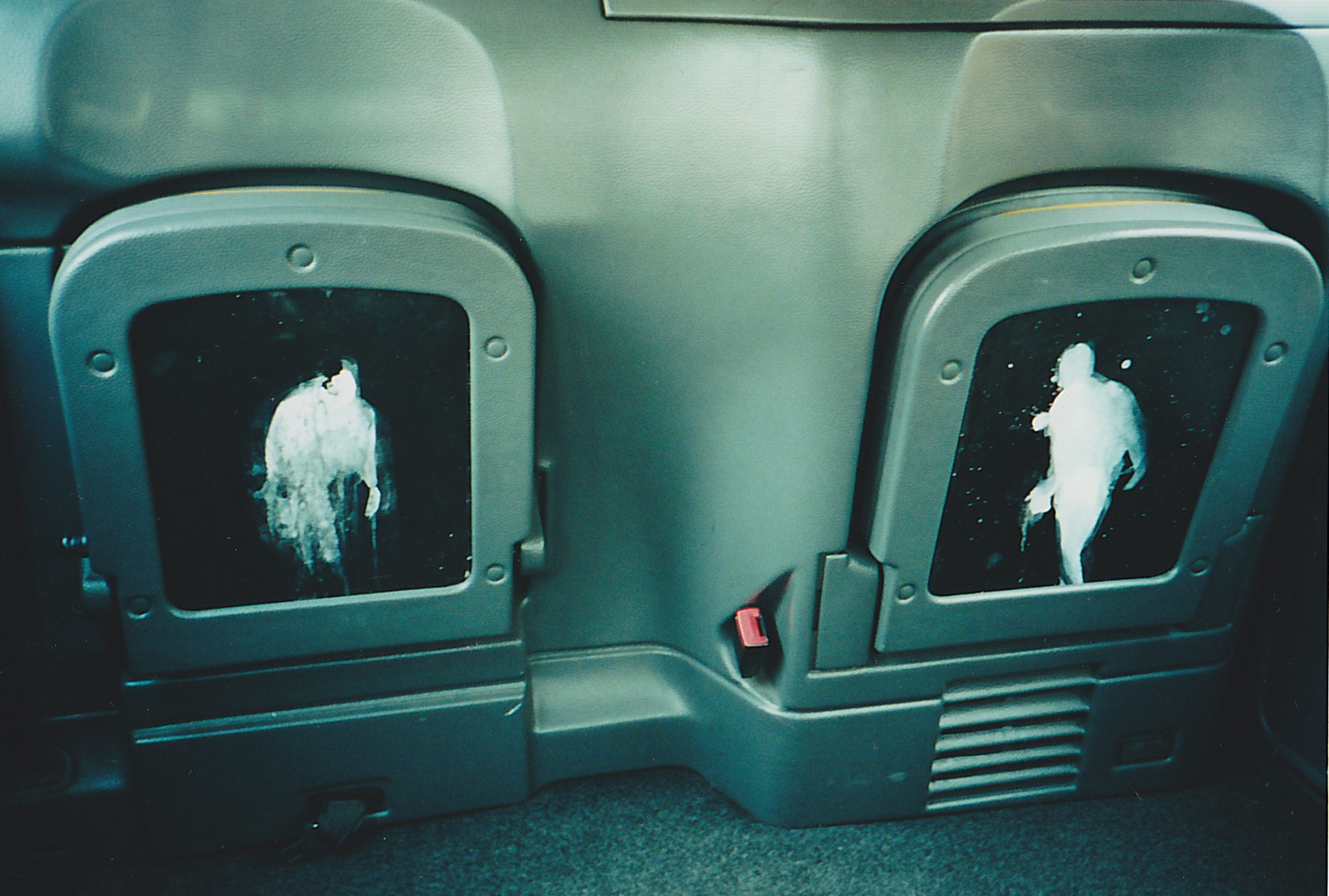
Mutilates by Susie Hamilton

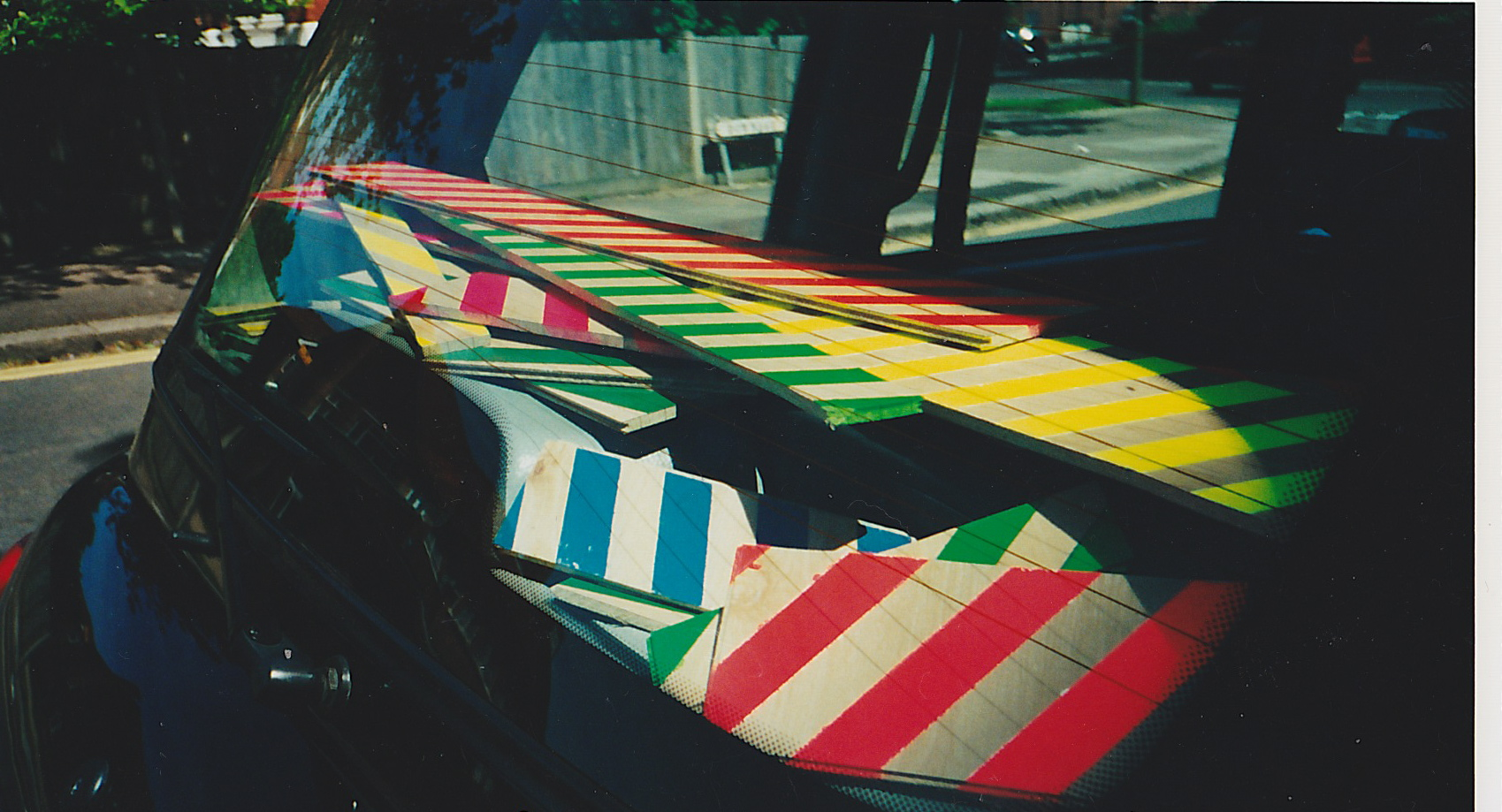
Drive-By Random Inner-City Material Colour Space Phenomenon by Donald Smith

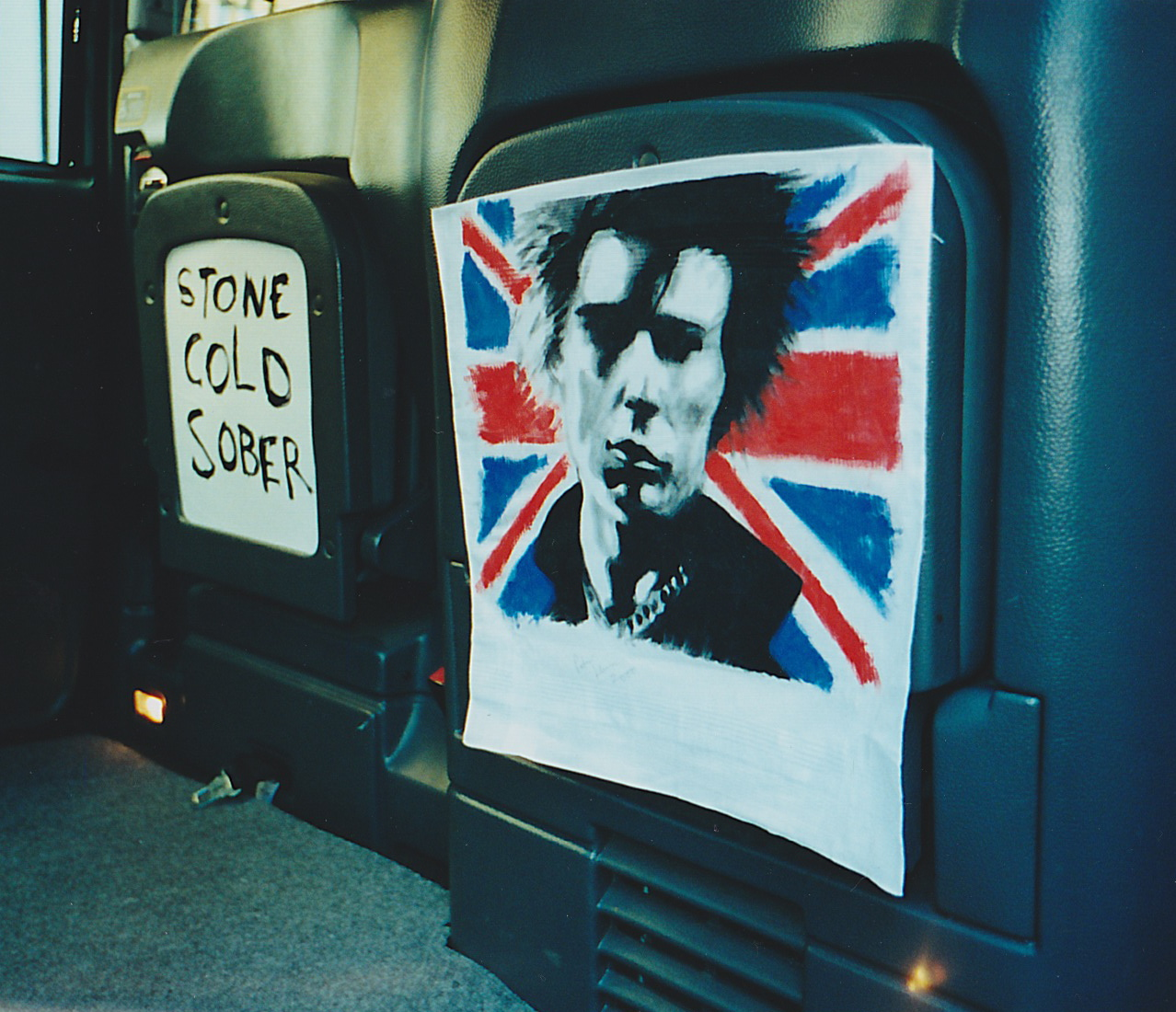
Stone Cold Sober by Fiona Banner and Sid Vicious by Peter Harris

== Retrospective ==
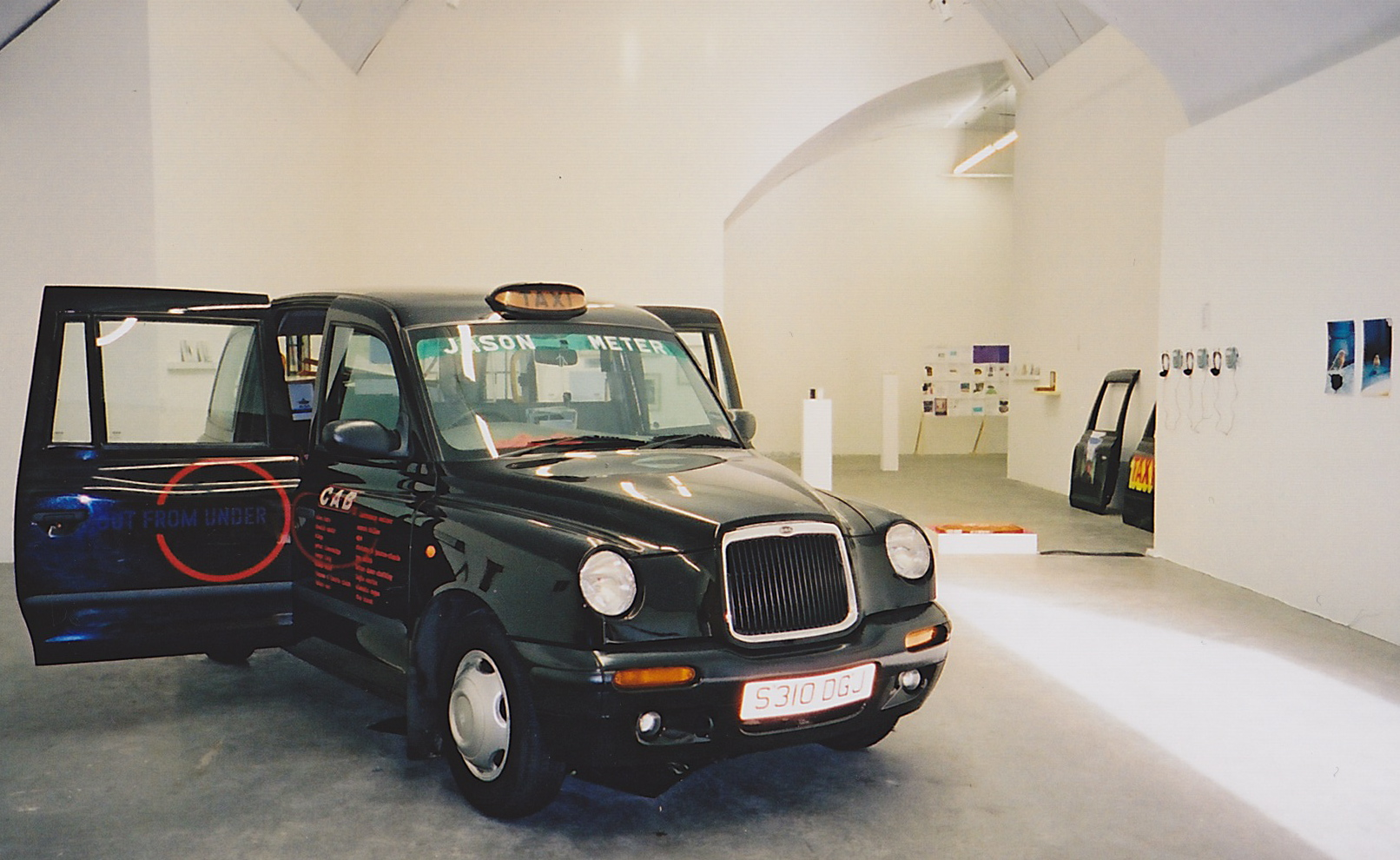
Retrospective with cab exterior Out from Under by Lawrence Weiner

The curators arranged for a retrospective exhibition immediately upon discontinuing the project, held as part of the opening of the Essor Gallery, which occupied the main gallery as well as a project space nearby. The Cab Gallery Retrospective ran from 15–22 January 2002 and included the "Cab Gallery" itself, which was parked up inside. All previous artworks were on show along with films and sound pieces.

== After Cab Gallery ==
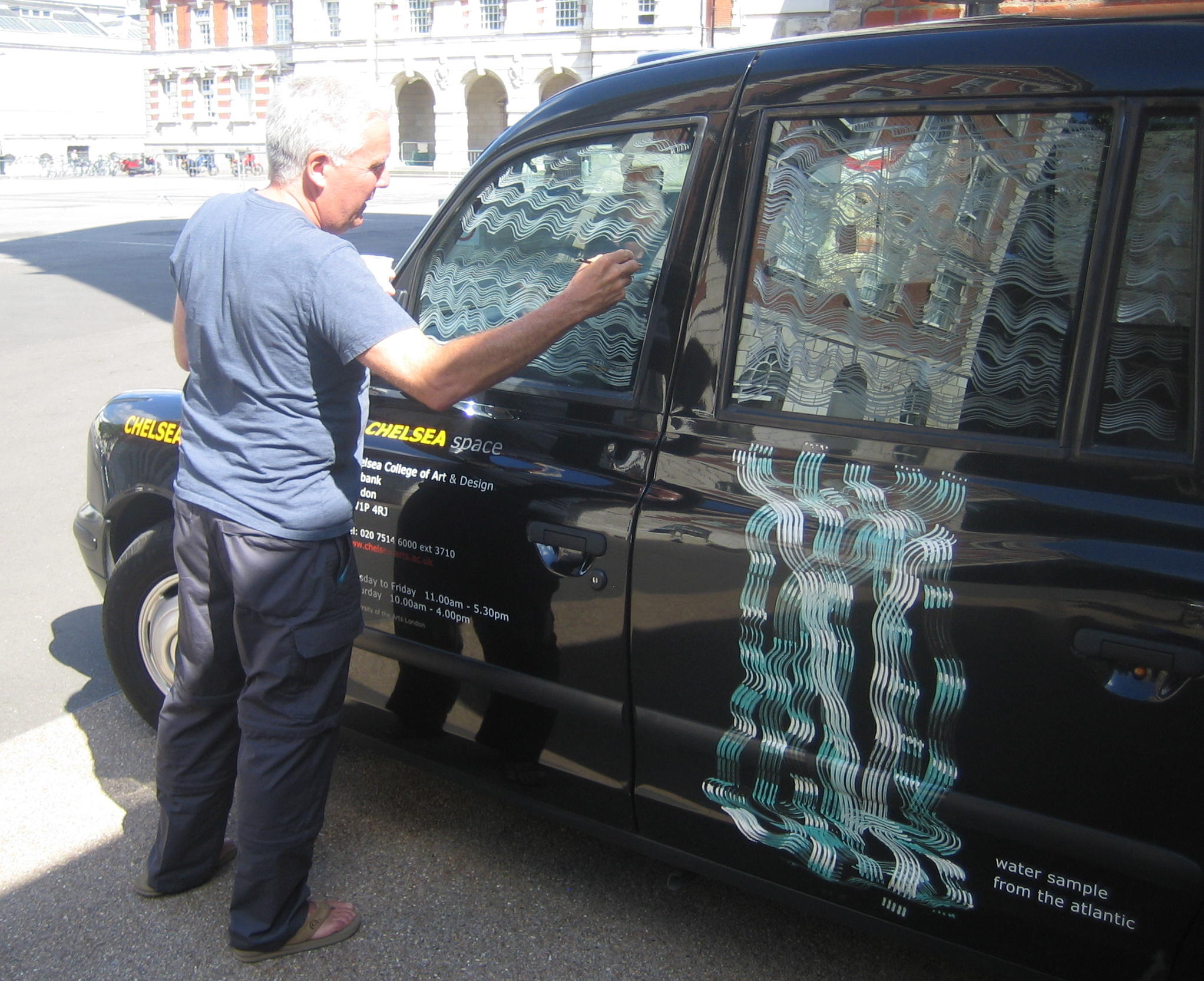
Stephen Farthing, RA prepares Chelsea Cab for Late at Tate

Paul Stolper continues as a leading London gallery owner and publisher.

Jason Brown collaborated with Chelsea space at Chelsea College of Art & Design to use the same taxi, renamed the Chelsea Cab, to exhibit new exterior artwork on the cab by Bruce McLean, Stephen Farthing RA and David Shrigley. In 2012 he moved to Nashville, Tennessee and continues to curate art shows including exchanges between London and Nashville. In 2012 Brown donated the entire Cab Gallery archive including artwork, correspondence and ephemera to the Special Collections at the Library at the Chelsea College of Art & Design.

== Exhibiting Artists ==
- APE (Adrian Corker and Paul Conboy)
- Fiona Banner
- Rachel Beckett
- "Bono & Sting" (David Mackintosh and Graham Parker)
- Brian Dawn Chalkley
- Christo & Jeanne-Claude
- Thomas A. Clark and Laurie Clark
- Abigail Cohen
- Nick Crowe
- Layla Curtis
- Die Kunst (Martin Vincent, David Mackintosh and Richard Hylton)
- Rose Finn-Kelcey
- Susie Hamilton
- Peter Harris
- Alex Katz
- Tanya Ling
- Peter Liversidge
- Jess Mallock
- Mike Marshal
- Jim Medway
- Rob Menzer
- Claudia Reyes
- Ray Richardson
- Si Sapsford
- Bob and Roberta Smith
- Donald Smith
- Jon Smith
- Sarah Staton
- Jemima Stehli
- Martin Vincent
- Jessica Voorsanger
- Lawrence Weiner
- Simon Wood
