= Postcard To Brooke =

- Artist: Oliver Guy-Watkins
- Year: 2008
- Type: Film-based participatory artwork
- Medium: Video recordings; public participation

Postcard To Brooke is a film based artwork by British artist and writer Oliver Guy-Watkins, that began in April 2008.

== Outline ==
Since April 2008, Oliver Guy-Watkins has undertaken to film an unlimited number of individuals reading the poem "Doubts" by Rupert Brooke. Guy-Watkins describes the work as a quest, and filmed near two hundred people in the projects first six months.

== Exhibitions and screenings ==
The first public event associated with Postcard To Brooke took place on 6 June 2008 at The Art Car Boot Fair at The Truman Brewery on Brick Lane in London. Oliver Guy-Watkins filmed fifty-six people during the six hours, and also instigated The Box Of Doubts for the first time. This entailed individuals writing their own doubts on a blank postcard.

On 24 June 2008, Oliver Guy-Watkins screened the eighty-nine readings recorded up until that date, at the newly opened Miss Micks venue in Berlin. He was also joined by the artist Tom J Mason to host a Discussion Of Doubts, relating to the postcards which had been used at the Art Car Boot Fair.

Over the weekend of 23–24 August 2008, Oliver Guy-Watkins attended the Flat Lake Festival in Clones, Ireland where he filmed a further 52 individuals, before screening two short edits in the cinema tent on Sunday evening. He also gave a talk regarding the quest.

In March 2009, Guy-Watkins held the first of two 'Evening Of Doubt' events at Shoreditch House in East London, where he was joined by Art Car Boot Fair founder Karen Ashton, artists Boo Saville and Jessica Voorsanger, and gallerist Hannah Watson of Trolley Gallery, to discuss the contents of the postcards that have been contributed with individuals person doubts written on. The second event took place on 19 April 2009 where the guests included writer Damian Barr and comedians Charlotte Reather and Paul Foot

== Readers ==
Notable individuals who have contributed to Postcard To Brooke include Nobel Prize winner Seamus Heaney; comedians Dylan Moran, d Byrne, Tim Key, Richard Herring, Chris Neill, Tony Allen, Angus Lindsay, Tony Green, John Seagrave; authors Patrick McCabe, Damian Barr, Victoria Mary Clarke, Karen Ashton, Ciarán Carson; Lady Mary Archer; Jodie Harsh; actors Ryan Sampson, Adrian Barnes, Cecilia Colby, Glen Conroy; artists Marc Horowitz, Jessica Voorsanger, Patrick Brill; photographer Craig Cowling; and Brooke Society chairman Lorna Beckett.

Alongside the notable names are individuals from many walks of life, including firemen, doctors, care workers and the homeless.

Guy-Watkins has stated that the first section of the quest was autobiographical with him filming friends, family and work associates. The second part would be based around researching the life of Rupert Brooke, and the third would be to document a number of social groups and stereotypes that exist in the early 21st Century.

== Social documentation ==
As well as having filmed a number of individuals who belong to certain social groups on a one off basis, Oliver Guy-Watkins has recently announced a series of events in association with organisations that represent those who are governed by specific social restrictions. The first of these events runs in conjunction with GEAR projects, Gloucestershire's only homeless shelter. Guy-Watkins intends to document both the staff and patrons of the charity by filming the reading Doubts, as well as inviting them to contribute their own doubts on blank postcards.
