= Oliver Guy-Watkins =

British film director

Oliver Guy-Watkins (born 6 October 1979) is a British film director, writer and artist.

== Background ==
Oliver Guy-Watkins was born in Stroud, Gloucestershire, England. He studied a Masters in Fine Art at Central St Martins School of Art in London,

== Film ==
In 2014 Oliver Guy-Watkins completed an experimental feature length film called Always In The Present which screened at St Albans Film Festival.

In 2018, Guy-Watkins' first documentary was completed, focussing on artist Martin Firrell as he sought to investigate gender representation in the UK to coincide with the 50th anniversary of the Sexual Offences Act. The film was called Overthrow The Social Order and was part of the media library at Visions Du Reel Festival in Switzerland as well as screening on Sky Arts in New Zealand

The following year another documentary called Goodnight London was released, looking at the effects of gentrification in the city, as opposed to necessary regeneration. The film premiered at All Points East Festival as well as screening at The Punk Film Festival in Berlin, Byline Festival and Brighton Rocks where it won Best Feature Documentary.

In 2020 work was completed on Guy-Watkins' third documentary Who Is James Payton? This film won Best Documentary feature at the South London Film Festival, although it did not screen due to Coronavirus restrictions.

== Writer ==
A collection of essays entitled Points of Trauma : A Consideration of the Influence Personal and Collective Trauma has on Contemporary Art, was released in 2018.

Guy-Watkins has written for a number of magazines and held the post of UK Editor for Big Shot Magazine from June 2007 until 2009.

== Art ==
In 2007 Guy-Watkins curated the Ruhe Bewahren exhibition in Tacheles, Berlin.

Guy-Watkins began work on a video work in 2007 entitled 'Postcard To Brooke', a project based around the poem Doubts by English poet Rupert Brooke. The work involved the filming of individuals reading the verse to camera, those who contributed included Nobel Prize–winning poet Seamus Heaney, artists Patrick Brill (Bob And Roberta Smith), Adham Faramawy, Marc Horowitz and Jessica Voorsanger, Mary Archer, comedians Mark Thomas, Tony Allen, Dylan Moran, John Seagrave, Media:Chris Neill, Angus Lindsay and authors Patrick McCabe, Victoria Mary Clarke, Damian Barr and Ciarán Carson, as well as the poet laureate of Vancouver George McWhirter. During the period of March to September 2008, Guy-Watkins filmed these and over two hundred and fifty other individuals for the quest.

Postcard To Brooke was exhibited in 2008 at The Art Car Boot Fair, on Brick Lane, London; Miss Micks in Berlin, Gloucester Guildhall and The Flat Lake Festival, Clones, Co. Monaghan, Ireland.

In March 2008, Guy-Watkins was enlisted by American artist Marc Horowitz to assist in the writing and guest booking of 'The Me And You Show', an interactive exhibition, broadcast live on the internet from The Hayward Gallery in London.
