= Susie Hamilton =

English painter

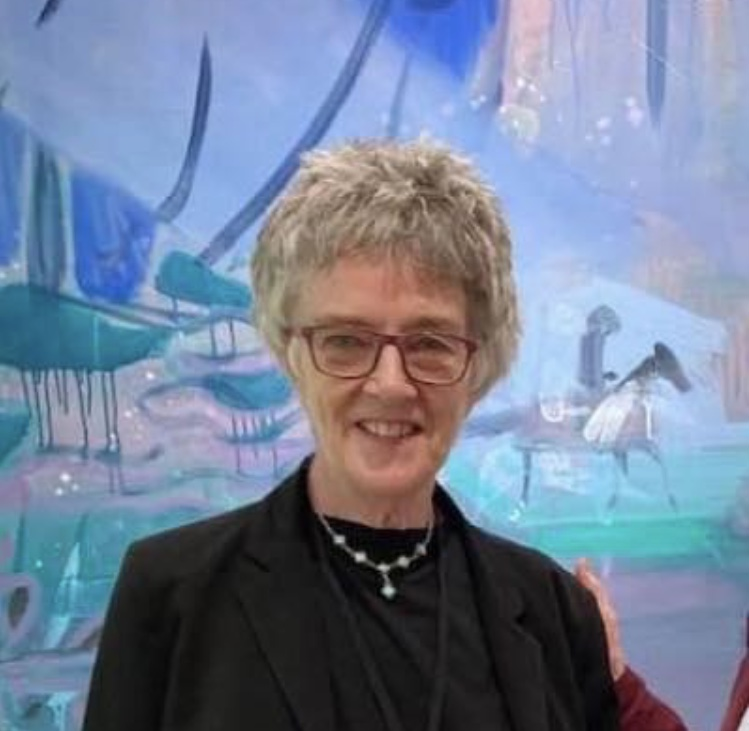
- Hamilton in her studio in East London
- Born: London, England
- Education: St. Martins School of Art; Byam Shaw School of Art; Birkbeck, University of London (PhD)
- Occupation: Artist
- Website: susiehamilton.co.uk

Susie Hamilton (born 10 August 1950) is an English artist. She lives and works in London and is represented by Paul Stolper Gallery.

== Early life and education ==
Hamilton, born on 10 August 1950, studied painting at St Martins School of Art and Byam Shaw School of Art in London (now Central St. Martins, University of the Arts London), before reading English Literature at Birkbeck, University of London. She gained a PhD on metamorphosis of identity in Shakespearean drama in 1989 at Birkbeck.

== Career ==
=== Artistic style ===
Hamilton's style has been called ‘iconoclastic’ since her painting is a process of making and unmaking. A member of the painting collective Contemporary British Painting, Hamilton works with Hospital Rooms Arts and Mental Health Charity, painting murals in psychiatric intensive care units, contributing work to their charity auctions and leading workshops online and in hospitals. Hamilton has been called a "flâneur" since she observes from the sidelines, scrutinising tourists, shoppers, holidaymakers, diners, hen nights and other scenes of leisure. She has to work extremely quickly to catch particular movements and poses and this means that her figures are compressed, abbreviated and simplified and usually morph into something misshapen and grotesque. Of her work Hamilton has said "I often wanted to paint joy (as well as its opposite)."

=== Selected projects ===
In 2015, Hamilton was artist-in-residence at St. Paul's Cathedral, London. Her paintings are represented in Picturing People by Charlotte Mullins (Thames and Hudson, 2015) and On Margate Sands: Paintings and Drawings based on Eliot's 'The Waste Land', 2018.

In 2018, she made "Polar Light", a large wall-painting for "The Junipers" psychiatric unit in Exeter.

In 2020, she made a series of work showing doctors, nurses and patients facing COVID-19, some of which are now held by The Science Museum.

In 2021, she painted a triptych for Askew psychiatric intensive care unit in Hammersmith, with a filmed interview by Ben Luke as part of the WHO programme "Healing Arts: The Future is Unwritten".

In 2022, she completed three large paintings based on Chinese poetry for the central staircase of the new hospital in Tooting.

In 2025, Hamilton was among 52 UK visual artists invited to create work responding to the lyrics of Kate Bush’s "Running Up That Hill" for the Sound & Vision charity project, a fundraising exhibition for War Child. Her contribution was a piece titled "And If I Only Could I’d Make a Deal With God".

Her paintings are held in public and private collections which include Murderme (the art collection of Damien Hirst), The Priseman Seabrook Collection, The Deutsche Bank Art Collection, The Economist, The Bernard Jacobson Collection, Groucho Club, New Hall Art Collection University of Cambridge and The Methodist Modern Art Collection, London.

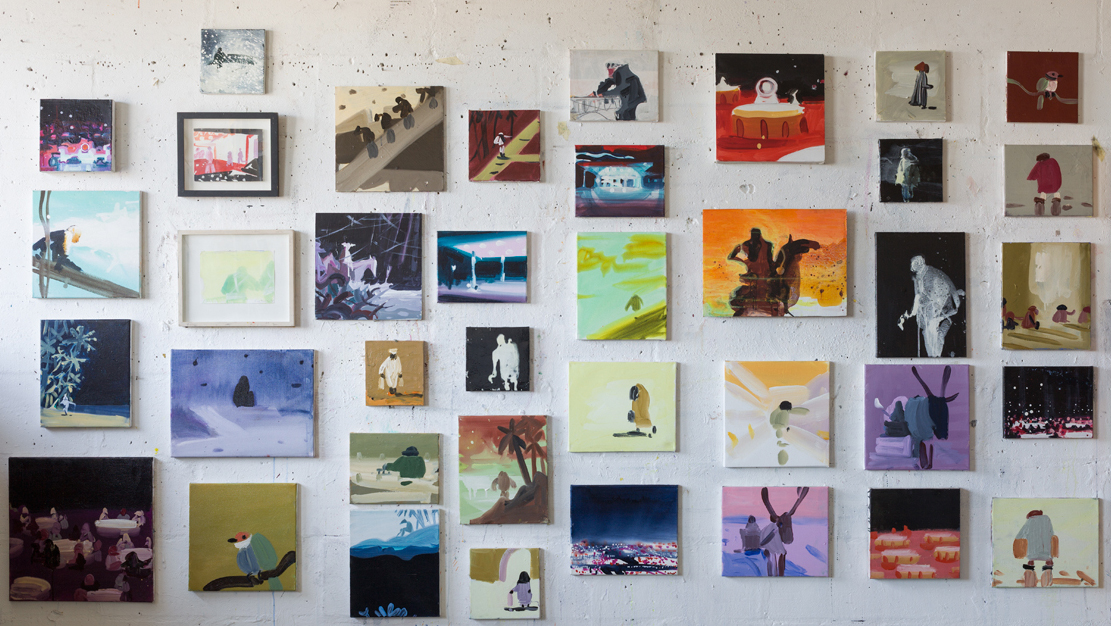
Hamilton's studio

== Selected solo exhibitions ==
- Underground, exhibition and book launch, Paul Stolper Gallery, London (2025)
- Radiance and Shadows, Paul Stolper Gallery, London (2024)
- Art in Focus, Imperial College Healthcare: Charing Cross, Hammersmith and St Mary’s Hospitals (2023)
- Unbound, Paul Stolper Gallery, London (2022)
- “Solo Contemporary”, British Art Fair, London (2022)
- "Ecstasy" and "C19" online, Paul Stolper (2021)
- In Atoms, Paul Stolper, London (2016)
- "Here Comes Everybody", St Paul's Cathedral, London (2015)
- Shoppers, The House of St Barnabas, London (2015)
- "Roaring Girls", The House of St Barnabas, London (2015)
- A New Heaven and a New Earth, St Giles Cripplegate (2011)
- Madly Singing in the Mountains, Paul Stolper, London (2009)
- World of Light, Triumph Gallery, Moscow (2008)
- Paintings and Monoprints, Galleri Trafo, Oslo (2007)
- Leisure Paintings, Paul Stolper, London (2006)
- Immense Dawn, Paul Stolper, London (2004)
- Paradise Alone, Ferens Art Gallery, Hull (2002)
- Dissolve to Dew, St Edmund Hall, Oxford (2002)
- Mutilates, St Giles Cripplegate, London (2001)

== Selected group exhibitions ==
- Soho Open, Great Pulteney Street Gallery, London (2025)
- Atemkristall, Blyth Gallery, Imperial College, London (2025)
- Winter Exhibition, Lido Stores, Margate (2024)
- Bed, Durden and Ray, Los Angeles, USA (2024)
- Held in Hope, Bonhams, London (2023)
- Sila, Royal Geographical Society, London (2023)
- The Tyranny of Ambition, Highlanes Gallery, Drogheda, Ireland (2022)
- London Original Print Fair, Paul Stolper, Somerset House, London (2022)
- Art and Psychiatric Intensive Care, Cork St Galleries, London (2021)
- Bed, Bobinska Brownlee Gallery, London (2021)
- Dance First Think Later, General Practice Project Space, Lincoln (2020)
- Trinity Buoy Wharf Drawing Prize, London (2019)
- Another World, Frieze, London (2018)
- Isolation Chamber Vacation, Worthing Museum (2017)
- Mikhail Savitsky Gallery, Minsk and Belarusian Cultural Centre, Moscow (2016/2017)
- Contemporary Masters from Britain: 80 British Painters of the 21st Century, Tianjin Academy of Fine Arts Museum, China, Jiangsu Art Gallery, Nanjing, China, Jiangsu Museum of Arts and Crafts (Artall), Nanjing, China, Yantai Art Museum, China (2017/18)
- The Art of Mary, Southwell Minster, Nottinghamshire (2016)
- Contemporary British Watercolours, Burton Art Gallery & Museum, Bideford, Devon (2016)
- "The John Ruskin Prize – Recording Britain Now: Society" The New Art Gallery Walsall, Walsall (2016)
- The Names, Transition Gallery, London (2016)
- Contemporary British Watercolours, Maidstone Museum & Bentlif Art Gallery, Maidstone, Kent (2015)
- Drawing Biennial 2015, The Drawing Room, London (2015)
- Material Tension, Collyer Bristow Gallery, London (2015)
- Brentwood Stations of The Cross, Brentwood Cathedral (2015)
- Contemporary British Painting, Huddersfield Art Gallery (2014)
- Susie Hamilton/Georgia Hayes/Mit Senoj, Paul Stolper Gallery, London (2014)
- Winter Salon, Lloyds Club, London (2013)
- Time Will Come, Factory-Art – Berlin, Berlin (2012)
- Vacant Lots, WW Gallery, London (2012)
- "Threadneedle Prize" Mall Galleries, London (2012)
- "Jerwood Drawing Prize", Jerwood Space, London (2012)
- In The Flesh, Paul Stolper Gallery, London (2011)
- "Seconds Issue 12: Archetype: Going Underground / The Cruel Scene Of The Image" Event, London (2010)
- "Keep me posted" Posted, London (2010)
- Drink & Dial, WW Gallery, London (2010)
- Summer Exhibition, Royal Academy of Arts, London (2009)
- Strictly Painting – The Right Side of Painting, National Suisse Hochhaus, Frankfurt/Main (2005)
- "John Moores 23" Walker Art Gallery Liverpool (2004)

== Selected publications ==
- "The Self in Speech", Garageland 19 (2017)
- 'On Margate Sands: Paintings and Drawings based on TS Eliot's The Waste Land
- "Nick Fudge and Susie Hamilton In Conversation", Turps Banana Magazine, Issue-18 (2017)
- In Search of the Beautiful: The Art of Susie Hamilton by Richard Davey, Image Journal (2016)
- "Encyclopedia of Red", The Art Newspaper, ARTY 36 (2016)
- Picturing People: The New State of the Art by Charlotte Mullins (2015)
- "Susie Hamilton" Anomie Publishing (2024)
- "Underground", Hurtwood, with texts by Matthew Holman (2025)
- "Windows", Arty, issue 48 (2025)

== Selected collections ==
- New Hall Art Collection, University of Cambridge
- The Priseman Seabrook Collection
- The Methodist Modern Art Collection, London
