= Jemima Stehli =

British feminist artist (born 1961)

- Born: 1961 (age 64–65); London

Jemima Stehli (born 1961) is a British feminist artist, who is especially known for her naked self-portrait photographs. Stehli lives and works in London.

== Biography ==
She received a BA Honours Fine Art at Goldsmiths' College in 1983, and her MA Fine Arts from Goldsmiths' in 1991.

She now lectures in Postgraduate Studies in Art Practice at Goldsmiths.

== Art practice ==
Stehli has explored themes of sexuality and the gaze throughout her practice. Most of her photographs are set in her studio.

Her naked self-portraits explore performativity and complicity in the representation of the female nude. Throughout her practice she has investigated the role and position of the viewer in relation to the image. Stehli has also created photographs in which she inserts herself into well-known artworks by male artists.

=== 1990s ===
In 1998 she pastiched Allen Jones's iconic 1960s sculpture Table I. Stehli said about this work, "I wanted not only to show woman as a sexual object, but to show myself, the artist, becoming an object." Stehli also appropriated the photography of Helmut Newton in Here They Come (1999).

Rebecca Fortnum included Stehli in her 2006 anthology Contemporary British Women Artists: In Their Own Words.

=== 2000s ===
The Strip series (2000) represented Stehli undressing in front of seated male art world figures, with the men choosing when to activate the camera. Amongst the curators, critics artists and art dealers represented were Adrian Searle, Matthew Higgs and Matthew Collings. Stehli stated that ‘there is a very real power in situations with that kind of looking. I’m always trying to figure out what is interesting about looking at something. It’s a very powerful act.’ (2017)

=== Collaboration with If Lucy Fell ===
Stehli's 2014 exhibition Endears me, yet remains resulted from a collaboration with the Lisbon-based band If Lucy Fell. The exhibition consisted of footage Stehli had filmed of the band while they travelled. Stehli stated that 'they had enjoyed being taken out of the rock venue and into the white space of the gallery and I wanted to be in their world, not thinking but feeling the energy of the performing moment'. (2014)

== Exhibitions ==
- 2014: Endears me, yet remains, Focal Point Gallery, Southend-on-Sea.
- 2011: Narrative Show, Eastside Projects, Birmingham.
- 2007: Jemima Stehli, Lisboa 20, Lisbon.
- 2007: Studio Double, ARTRA, Milan.
- 2003: mm/Studio, Contemporary Art Gallery, Vancouver.
- 2003: The Upsetting Table, Jeffrey Charles Gallery, London.
- 2003: Jemima Stehli, Lisson Gallery, London.
- 2001-2: Jemima Stehli, ARTRA, Milan.
- 2000: Project Info, Chisenhale Gallery, London.
- 2000: Karen 2000, Artlab, Imperial College, London.

== Awards ==
- 1998-2000: Artist in Residence, Delfina Studios, London.
- 1997: Award to Individual Artists, London Arts Board.
