= Jochem Hendricks =

German contemporary artist

- Born: c. 1959
- Occupation: Artist

Jochem Hendricks (born c. 1959) is a contemporary artist from Frankfurt, Germany. One of his works which asked "far-reaching questions about the value and meaning of labour" involved paying illegal immigrants to count millions of sand grains over a period of over eight years.

His earlier work included "eye drawings" whereby his pupils were tracked by a head-mounted scanner; the results were printed out and exhibited at the San Francisco Museum of Modern Art. His first solo exhibition in London was held at the Haunch of Venison in August 2007. In 2013, The New Art Gallery Walsall exhibited a collection of his installations, sculpture, film and paintings.
