= A.a.s (art group) =

British art group

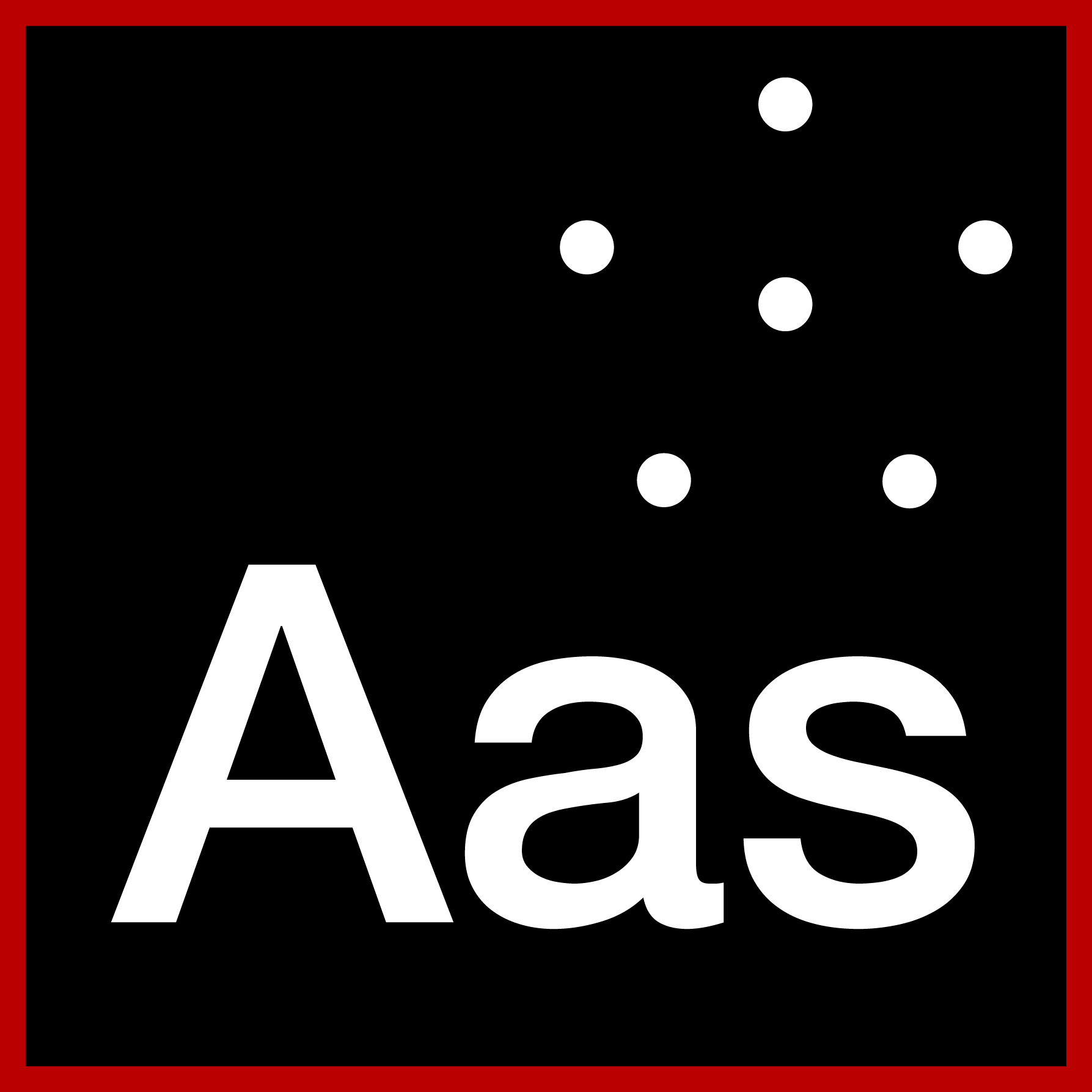
Current Aas logo, since 2018

a.a.s is a British art group that uses performance, installation, video, participatory art and Ritual in its practice.

== Biography ==
Founded in 2001, a.a.s (also known as AAS) has been described as an 'imaginary' art group that makes use of real, practicing artists to meet its ends. The current central team are Ana Benlloch, Ralph Dorey, Graham Dunning, Lyndsay Officer, Vanessa Page, Samuel Mercer, Tom Milsom and Dr. Stuart Tait but, to date, over a hundred artists have been part of a.a.s. The group has exhibited or taken part in projects in the United Kingdom, Europe, New York City and at Kaohsiung Museum of Fine Arts in Taiwan. The group's first extended residency was between October 2010 and January 2011, when they took part in the New Art Gallery Walsall's artist in residence programme. The residency signalled the end of a five-year series of projects collectively called The Other Place, and the end of a.a.s 'phase III.' In recent years, a.a.s has developed alternative ways of involving the audience in the work, and making space for audience-participants to co-author events has become increasingly central to their collaborations. Since entering phase four of the group, in 2011, the group have referred to themselves as AAS instead of a.a.s.

Phase 5 of AAS began on 21 December 2013 (Yule solstice) with the first AAS AGM and symposium in Greenwich, UK. During Phase 5, AAS has continued to develop its audio drone practice, which began in 2011 with the Samekhmem project at The Event festival in Birmingham. Their practice has also developed to include ritualistic and magical elements in often chaotic, improvised performances that have a neopagan relationship to time, such as the Triple Solstice Ritual (2014), which also included a three-part, heterogeneous reading of a paper on magic and ritual for a conference at Birmingham City University's Centre for Fine Art Research.

== Approach ==
AAS logo 2014-2018.

Early a.a.s works were often themed curatorial projects, such as We Are Relentless (2003) and Brain Jelly (2004), or complex interdisciplinary works on the theme of Science Fiction or fiction in general, such as I Want To Believe (2003) and The Quatermass Code (2006). Pil and Galia Kollectiv said about the group, in Plan B (magazine), that "London produces an army of efficient market pleasers, paranoid about competition and cynical about making money from their artwork. Elsewhere - or, more precisely, in Birmingham - people like a.a.s are making some of the most imaginative art around, seamlessly crossing over art, music and a host of curatorial projects without worrying about the divisions that arise in the capital."

More recently, in 'phase III,' the group seems to have become disillusioned with gallery-based practice, and sought a more participatory solution to the artist-audience hierarchy, in extended, performance fiction works such as KR-36 (2007) and The Family (2009). A.a.s artist Stuart Tait presented a research seminar on 'rhizomatic art practice' at Birmingham City University in 2008, which dealt almost exclusively with the project KR-36

AAS logo 2011-2014

Dr Tait has also presented conference papers, developed out of a.a.s practice-as-research, at Situationist Aesthetics (2012), and at the Diagram Research, Use & Generation Group (DRUGG) symposium at Slade School of Fine Art (2012). During Phase 5, with the influx of new core members, AAS has begun to write polyvocal academic papers, most notably Liminal Rites as Molecular Revolution (2014) presented at Twice Upon a Time: Magic, Alchemy and the Transubstantiation of the Senses.

The group's commitment to developing a practice in which the audience 'co-participate' with artists in producing the work has involved a commitment to "contradictory ideals", "irrational methods", "not giving people what they want", and presenting themselves "uncomfortably" in order to undermine normative ideas of authorship.

== Selected Projects ==
=== 2015 ===
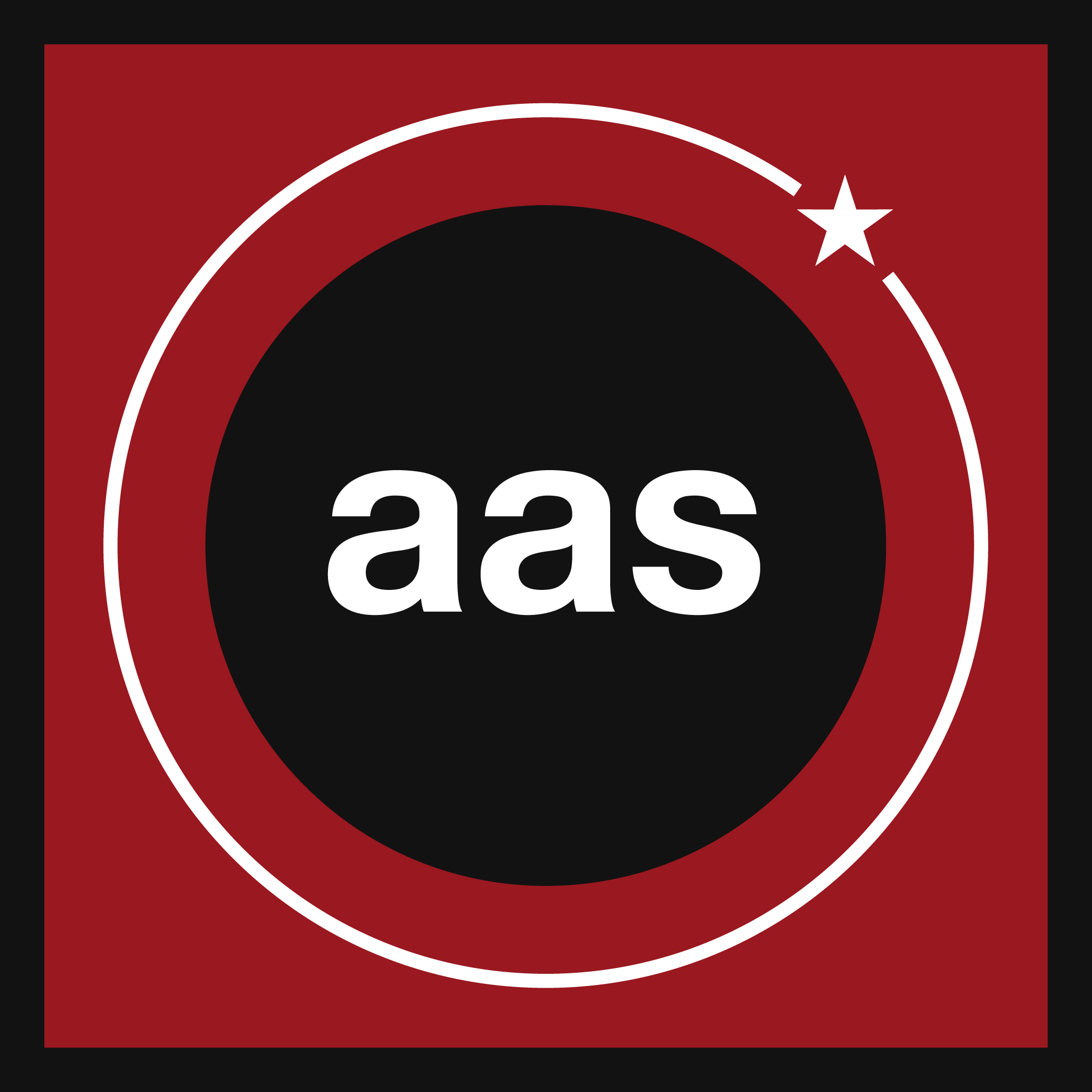
A.a.s logo 2007

The Cult of Sonic Affect (Performance - Supernormal festival)
Young Castle of The Elder Sun (Performance for live streaming - Gallery North, Newcastle & Flux Factory, NYC)

=== 2014 ===
Cult of The Great Unfolding (Performance - MkII Gallery)
Lammas Drone Silo (Performance - Hackney Wicked Festival)
Triple Solstice Ritual (Performances - BIAD, Ort Gallery, Epping Forest)
The Cult of Possible Elements (Performance - IMT Gallery)

=== 2013 ===
Circle of Fifths (An AAS curated audio event)
Infinite Drone Accumulator (AAS sculptural installation and performance)

=== 2012 ===
The Cult of Quatermass (Multi-media installation - Xero, Kline & Coma)
The Ancient Rite of Drone Levitation (Vocal performance - Supernormal Festival)

=== 2011 ===
Samekhmem Live at The Event (live and online project - The Event Festival)
Congress of the Collectives (Month-long conference & projects - Flux Factory)
The Cage & Xe54 (residency - New Art Gallery Walsall)

=== 2010 ===
The Changelings (Participatory performance)
The Nomads (dérive project - Castlefield Gallery)

=== 2009 ===
Berlin Hoodening: Nagual for Bjørn Nørgaard (Performance fiction for video)
The Family (Six-month co-participatory performance fiction project - The Event Festival)

=== 2008 ===
SCIENCIFIC (Participatory performance fiction project)
Clearing Station (Participatory project)
Re:Flux (Fluxconcert)
Product Clearing (Collaborative web and comic project)
This concept seems fantastic yet it has been proven (Audio installation)

=== 2007 ===
The Nagual (Performance fiction)
I am The Great Grock (Performance)
DY-66 (Co-participatory performance fiction project)
KR-36 (Co-participatory performance fiction project)

=== 2006 ===
The Quatermass Code (Collaboratively build installation and video)
A.S.B.O. (Performance fiction and installation)

=== 2005 ===
A stranger drifts into town or someone goes on a journey (Themed, curated exhibition)
Intertidal Zone Art Monitoring Station (Opening night performance)

=== 2004 ===
Project 99 [a.a.s. vs doTb] (Themed, curated, multi-venue, multiples, performance)
Brain Jelly (Curated performance event)

=== 2003 ===
Science Fiction Double Feature (Themed, curated exhibition)
We Are Relentless (Themed, curated exhibition)

=== 2002 ===
How can we make things better? (Participatory street performance)

=== 2001 ===
Iterating Exhibition (Self-multiplying exhibition)
