= Christiane Baumgartner =

German artist

- Born: 1967 (age 58–59); Leipzig
- Education: Royal College of Art
- Occupation: Artist

Christiane Baumgartner (born 1967 in Leipzig) is a German artist best known for her woodcut printmaking.

== Life and work ==
Baumgartner studied at the Hochschule fur Grafik und Buchkunst, Leipzig, from 1988 to 1994 before completing her master's degree in Printmaking at the Royal College of Art in London in 1999. Baumgartner is best known for the monumental woodcuts based on her own films and video stills, for example 1 Sekunde, in which she documented a single second of video in a series of 25 woodcuts. She has said that she is "interested in woodcut for conceptual reasons and not just for the love of the material...it's about bringing together the different mediums of the video still and the woodcut, about combining the first and the latest reproduction techniques to produce an image...." She first came to public attention in the UK in EAST international in 2004 with her print Shack and a year later with a major solo exhibition at the Ikon Gallery in Birmingham. She was included in the groundbreaking exhibition at MoMA, NY, Eye on Europe.

In 2009 she received the Teresa Bulgarini Prize for her woodcuts which deal with concepts of time, motion, velocity and acceleration. In 2012 she was awarded the first ever Goethe-Institut artist's residency in Vietnam, jointly sponsored by the state of Saxony. She began her three-month stay with an exhibition at the Goethe-Institut in Hanoi, Holzschnitt im digitalen Zeitalter (woodcut in the digital age) and finished with a tour around the country's art schools, sharing her experience in the art of woodcut. Her work was subject to a traveling retrospective in 2014–2015, with exhibitions at the Centre de la Gravure et de l'Image Imprimée in La Louviere, the Museum Kunstpalast in Düsseldorf, and the Musée d'Art et d'Histoire in Geneva; it was accompanied by the first oeuvre catalog in her career.

Baumgartner's works are included in the collections of Albertina (Vienna), the British Museum (London), the Städel (Frankfurt), Kadist Art Foundation (Paris), Kunsthaus Zurich, Museum der bildenden Künste (Leipzig), Museum of Fine Arts, (Boston), Museum of Modern Art (New York), Spendhaus (Reutlingen), Staatliche Kunstsammlungen Dresden, Stedelijk Museum (Amsterdam), The New Art Gallery Walsall and Victoria and Albert Museum (London), among others.

Her working process is largely intuitive. She begins by selecting an image from existing film footage she shoots off of a television screen. The grainy lines of the screen appear in her final images. She decides on the size and frequency of the lines and creates a half-tone image. Then she prints the image and transfers it onto a woodblock and starts cutting. She describes the wood cutting process as meditative and uses the cutting as time for reflection. Once the cutting is complete, at such a large scale she must ink and print by hand, using no press. "I also like the handmade aspect of the cutting with all its inaccuracies and mistakes – this is an important aspect of the final print."
