= Epstein Archive =

Collection of documents on the artist Jacob Epstein

Coordinates: 52°35′8.40″N 1°59′9.27″W

The Epstein Archive is one of the largest collections of archives documenting the personal and professional life of the renowned artist and sculptor, Jacob Epstein. It is housed at The New Art Gallery Walsall, in England.

== History ==
The collection of letters, diaries, journals and photographs was preserved due to the actions of the museum's Head of Collections, Jo Digger.

Kathleen Garman (later to become Kathleen Epstein, Jacob's second wife) had made her friend Beth Lipkin a major beneficiary in her will. They had shared a house together up until her death and the documents were all left behind.

In the late 1990s, Beth Lipkin was admitted into a nursing home. The letters, diaries and photographs were then at risk of being lost. However, as the house was being cleared, Jo Digger realised the importance of these documents and had them placed into suitcases and removed for storage.

Funding was sought in order to purchase the documents for The New Art Gallery Walsall; this was finally achieved in 2006, with funding for a permanent archivist obtained in 2009.

== Contents ==
The earliest of the archives dates back to the 1880s when a teenage Jacob Epstein wrote to the philanthropist Helen Moore asking if she would fund him so that he may pursue his dream of becoming an artist. She duly agreed to fund him and also arranged for him to work on a farm. The correspondence would continue, with him telling Moore of his interest in sculpture, something that he would become best known for.

The archives also reflect the turbulent and tragic aspects of his family and affairs; one tragic figure is that of his illegitimate son Theodore Garman who had started to make a name for himself as a prominent artist. A newspaper clipping in the archive taken from the Daily Mail, dated 23 January 1954, tells of the death of Theodore, who had died from a heart attack during a commotion whilst an ambulance team were trying to escort him to hospital as a result of him having a severe psychiatric episode. Even at the time of Theodore's death, Epstein is mentioned in the article as a fellow artist who had an interest in Theodore's work and not as his father, so even at this time Theodore's parentage is not publicly known. There is a picture of Theodore and Epstein looking at one of Theodore's paintings. The archives also hold the birth certificate of Epstein's illegitimate son Theodore, with just a pen stroke through the section 'Father'.
