= The New Art Gallery Walsall =

Art gallery in Walsall, West Midlands, England

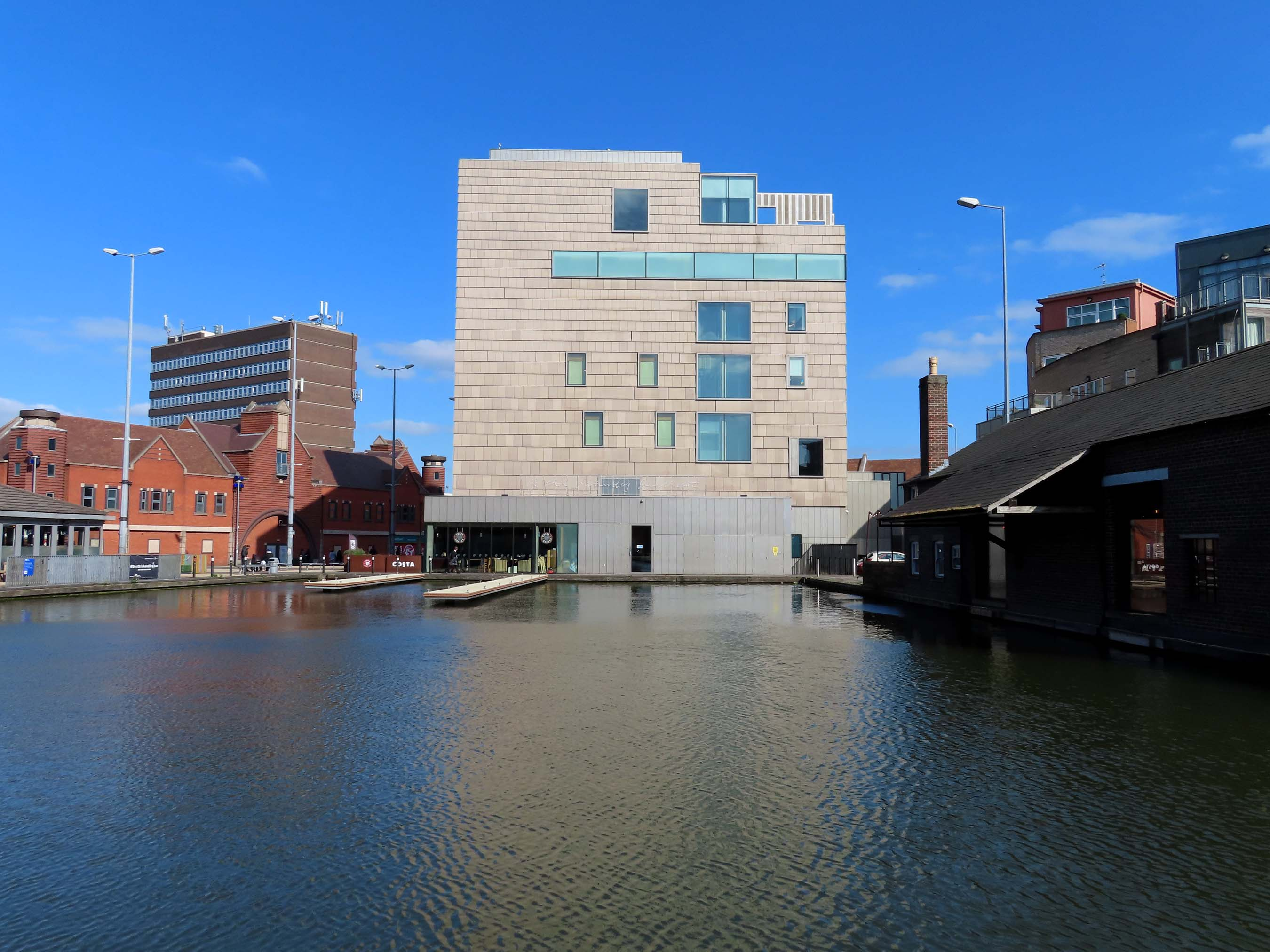
- Interactive map of the The New Art Gallery Walsall area

General information
- Location: Walsall, England52°35′8.40″N 1°59′9.27″W
- Construction started: 1995
- Completed: 2000
- Cost: £21 million
- Client: Walsall Metropolitan Borough Council

Design and construction
- Architect: Caruso St John
- Structural engineer: Arup

Website
- www.thenewartgallerywalsall.org.uk

The New Art Gallery Walsall is a modern and contemporary art gallery in the town of Walsall, in the West Midlands, England. It was built with £21 million of public funding, including £15.75 million from the UK National Lottery and additional money from the European Regional Development Fund and City Challenge.

The Gallery is funded by Walsall Council and Arts Council England; this funding is further supplemented by its own income generation. Admission is free. Its first Director was Peter Jenkinson. In May 2005, former BALTIC director Stephen Snoddy was appointed as director. In 2026 it was confirmed that a new video game, Lost In Art, would be set in the art gallery. This game will be avalible on Steam (service).

== Architecture ==
Designed by the architects Caruso St John after winning an international design competition, it opened in January 2000, replacing the town's old gallery and an arts centre that had been closed by the council almost a decade earlier. It was officially opened by Queen Elizabeth II on 5 May 2000, during her visit to the West Midlands. The New Art Gallery's stark building won several architectural awards and attracted over 237,000 visitors in its opening year. In 2000, the gallery was shortlisted for the prestigious Stirling Architecture Prize.

The five-story building is clad in pale terracotta and has a floor area of 5,000 square metres (53,820 sq ft). The interior of the Gallery features a heavy use of concrete and 75mm thick douglas fir wooden cladding. The public square surrounding the building was designed by Richard Wentworth and Catherine Yass.

The Gallery has been seen as an attempt to encourage regeneration in the local area. The architecture has been both praised and criticised, described as "almost flawless" by the RIBA and "extraordinarily good" by Hugh Pearman but also castigated by John Stewart-Young as an "architectural indulgence", an impressive building that lacks consideration of how the wider public will use it. The essayist Theodore Dalrymple described the interior as resembling both "a fascist foreign ministry" and "a sauna of gigantic proportions".

There have been a number of minor alterations to the building since its opening, including changing of the ground floor retail area into a cafe, and addition of more windows around its entrance. In 2006, Floor 4 of the gallery was transformed from a restaurant area into a new gallery space. The gallery space with 8m high ceiling has enabled the Gallery to present a further programme of exhibitions, in addition to its main temporary exhibition galleries. This has included exhibitions by regional and international artists including David Batchelor, Richard Billingham and Leo Fitzmaurice.

In 2012, artist Sarah Staton was commissioned to design a new sculpture terrace for the Gallery, opening to the public later that same year the space converted a previously underused area of patio on floor 4.

== Collections ==
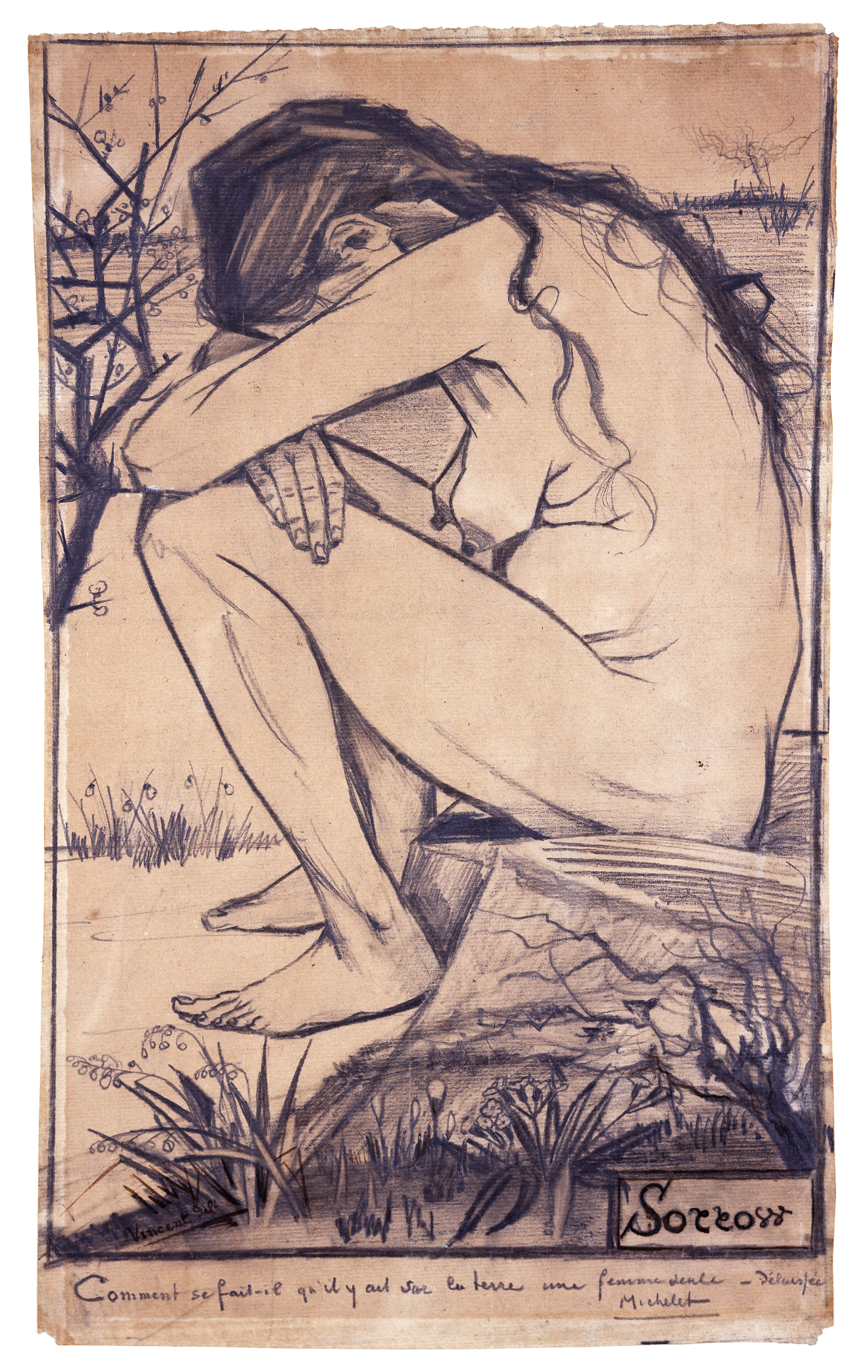
Vincent van Gogh - Sorrow

The Gallery houses the fixed Garman Ryan Collection of sculptures and paintings by modern masters including a large selection of work by Jacob Epstein and many significant works by European artists including Vincent van Gogh, Claude Monet, Turner, Corot, Renoir and Constable represented in prints, sketches, drawings, paintings and sculptures. The collection was donated to the people of Walsall in 1973 by Epstein's late wife Kathleen Garman (Lady Epstein) and her friend Sally Ryan.

In 2006, the gallery acquired the Epstein Archive, a collection of photographs, manuscripts, sketches and correspondence between Jacob Epstein and his family and friends, patrons, buyers and galleries. In 2009 Bob and Roberta Smith was commissioned to work alongside Archive Curator Neil Lebeter to reveal the previously undocumented and unseen Epstein Archive to audiences. The initiative forms part of New Ways of Curating, a project initiated by Arts Council England.

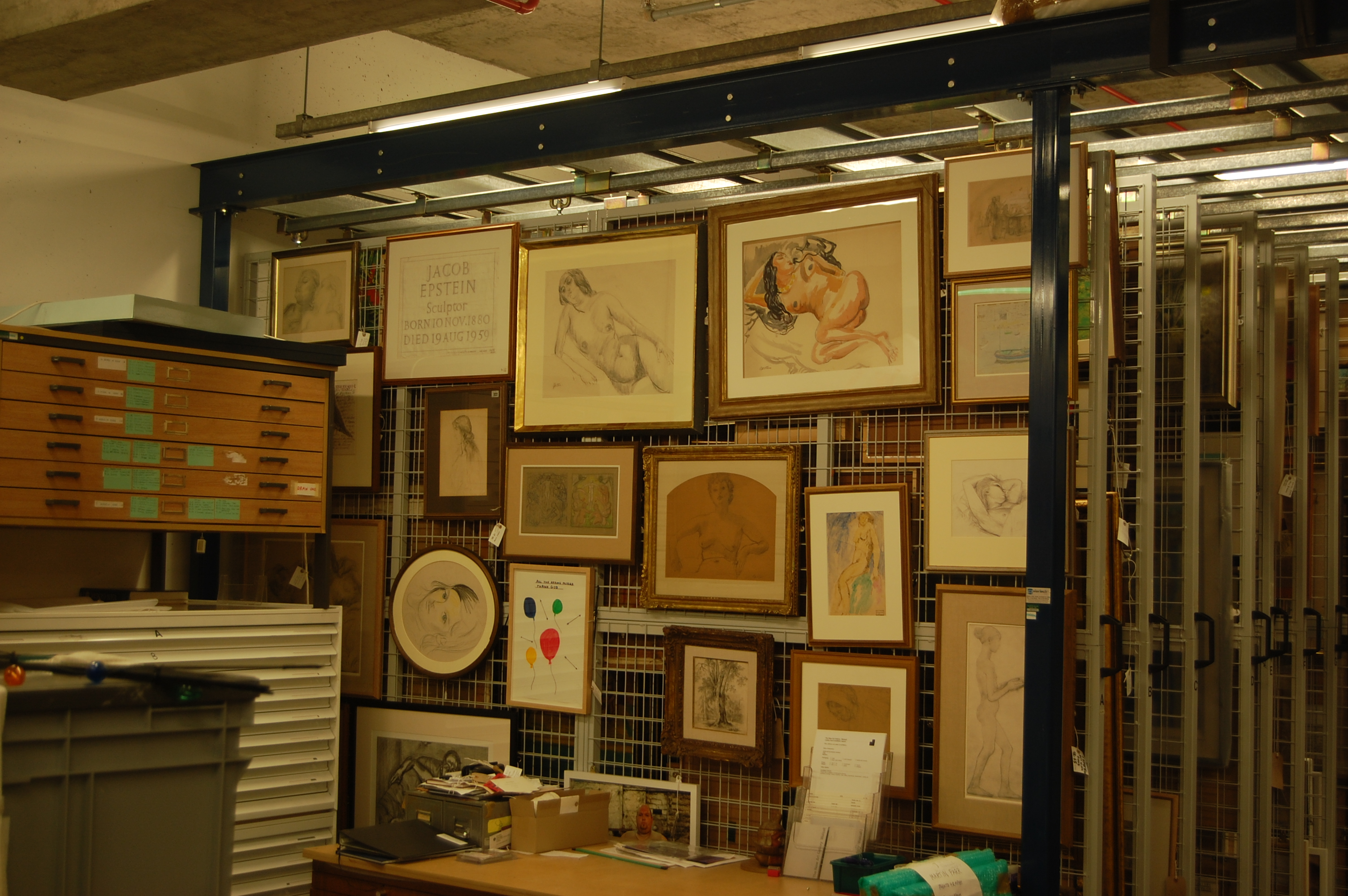
The basement art store holds works that are not on display

The permanent collection of artworks at the Gallery incorporates the municipal holdings built up from 1892, from the formal foundation of Walsall's art collection. It ranges from Victorian paintings by Frank Holl and Briton Rivière, including some of local interest through to works by contemporary artists, such as Catherine Yass, Robert Priseman and Fiona Banner. Through the Contemporary Art Society Special Collection scheme, the New Art Gallery Walsall was able to add to its collections works by Gavin Turk, Hew Locke, Mike Nelson, Yoshihiro Suda, Dorothy Cross, Laura Ford, Darren Lago, Estelle Thompson, Richard Woods, Yinka Shonibare and Rose Finn-Kelcey. The works that comprise this collection transfer ownership to Walsall Council from the Contemporary Art Society in 2014.

In 2007, the New Art Gallery was awarded £1million through the Art Fund International to collect international contemporary art on the theme of the metropolis. This has included the acquisition of works by Jochem Hendricks, Grazia Toderi, Dynita Singh, Zhang Enli, Christiane Baumgartner, Barry McGee and Nicolas Provost.

== Exhibitions ==
The temporary exhibition galleries on the third and fourth floor are dedicated to exhibiting contemporary and historic art. The Gallery has held solo exhibitions by artists including Suzanne Treister, Mark Titchner, Toby Ziegler, Conrad Shawcross, Hew Locke, Joana Vasconcelos, Zarina Bhimji, Christopher Le Brun, Gordon Cheung, Layla Curtis, Anna Barriball, Adam Dant Gavin Turk and Jonathan Yeo.

Between 2012 and 2013, the Gallery hosted the first year-long display of works by artist Damien Hirst as part of the ARTIST ROOMS on Tour in partnership with Tate.

The New Art Gallery also has a history of exhibiting group shows, beginning with the inaugural exhibition Blue featuring works by artists such as Anish Kapoor, Glen Brown, Barbara Hepworth and Bridget Riley.

The 2009 exhibition Re-Imagining Asia, aimed to explore the meaning and relevance of the term “contemporary Asian art” in the 21st century and within a wider context of globalisation, migration and an increasingly international art world. It featured artists such as Song Dong, exhibiting here in the UK for the first time.

In 2010, the New Art Gallery celebrated its tenth birthday with the exhibition Party!.

In 2011, the Gallery hosted the exhibition The Life of The Mind: Love, Sorrow and Obsession, curated by artist Bob and Roberta Smith. This included key works by Sarah Lucas, Louise Bourgeois, Tracey Emin and Yayoi Kusama.

== Artist residencies ==
The gallery has continually supported emerging and established artists from throughout the UK through their regular residency programs. Artists in residence include: a.a.s, Simon and Tom Bloor, Sean Burn, Faye Claridge, Lucienne Cole, Harminder Judge, Juneau Projects, Karin Kihlberg and Reuben Henry, Feng-Ru Lee, Bob and Roberta Smith, Ivan Smith, Yoke and Zoom.

== Education work ==
The Discovery Gallery, now rebranded Disco, was the first interactive art space of its kind in the country, designed specifically for young visitors and families. Over 60,000 school children have visited The New Art Gallery since 2003, along with 34,000 lifelong learning participants. The Gallery gained the Learning Outside the Classroom quality badge mark in 2009. The New Art Gallery Walsall was one of the first cultural organisations in the UK to take on a Creative Apprentice in 2009.

The Gallery, alongside Ikon Gallery, works in partnership with Birmingham City University to run the Artist Teacher Scheme, a professional development programme for art educators.

== Other facilities ==
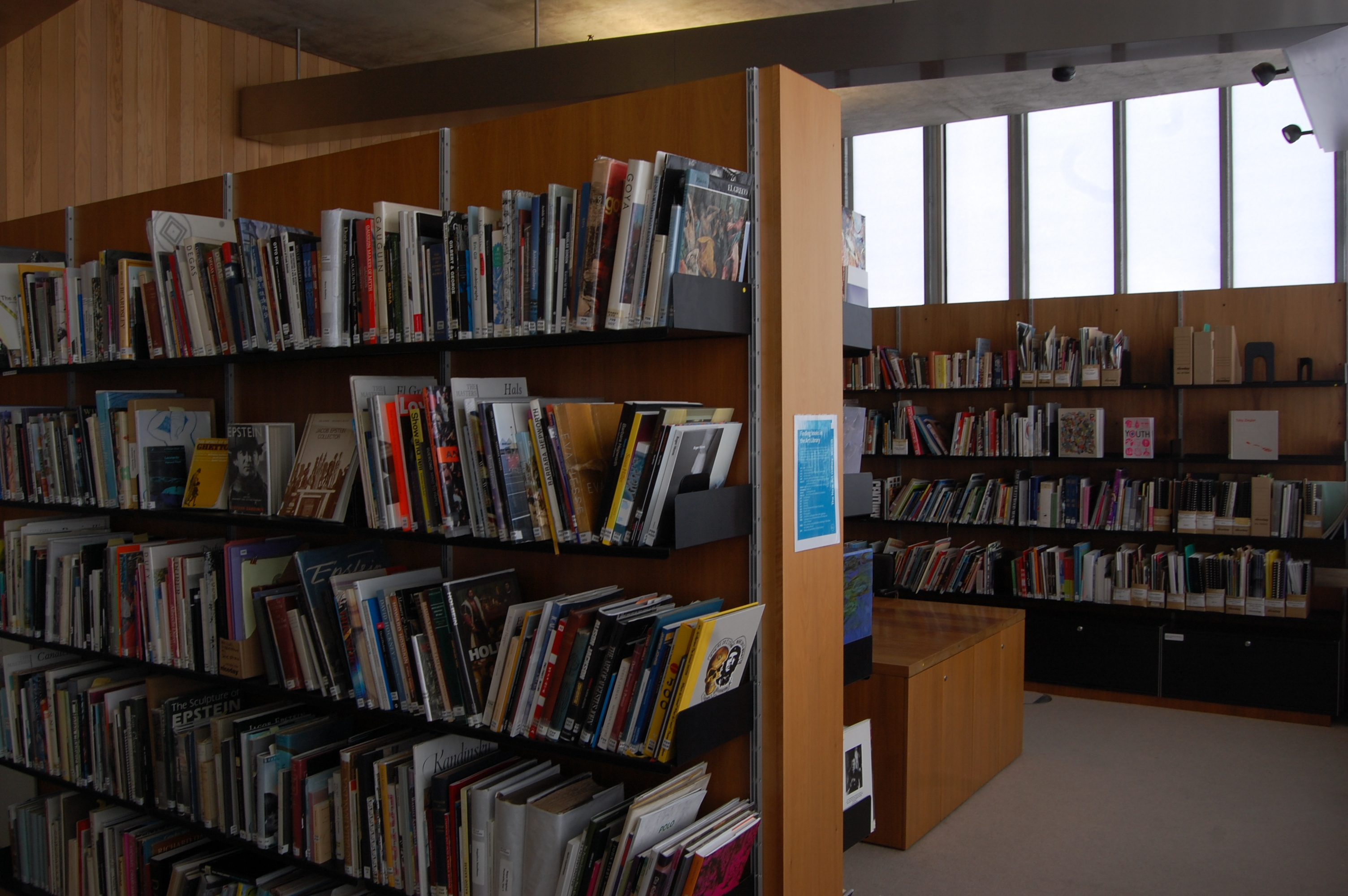
The Art Library

The New Art Gallery has free public Wi-Fi throughout the building.

In 2006, the Gallery opened a free public access Art Library, where visitors are able to learn about culture, exhibitions and award-winning architecture. Since opening nearly 50,000 people have made use of the specialist collection of books, journals and archive material.

The ground floor café in The New Art Gallery Walsall was transformed into a Costa Coffee store in August 2007.

== Gallery ==
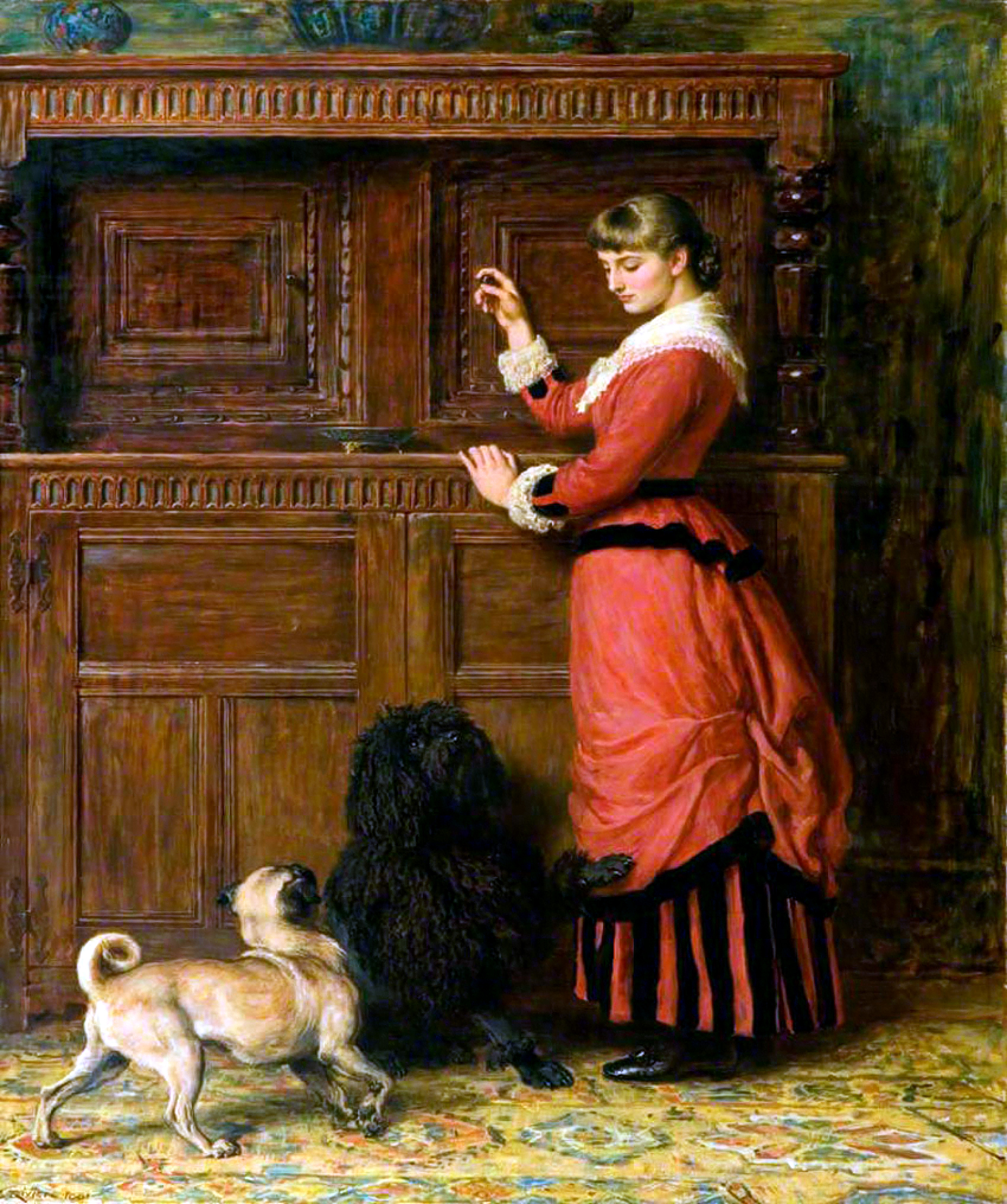
Cupboard Love (Briton Rivière) 1881

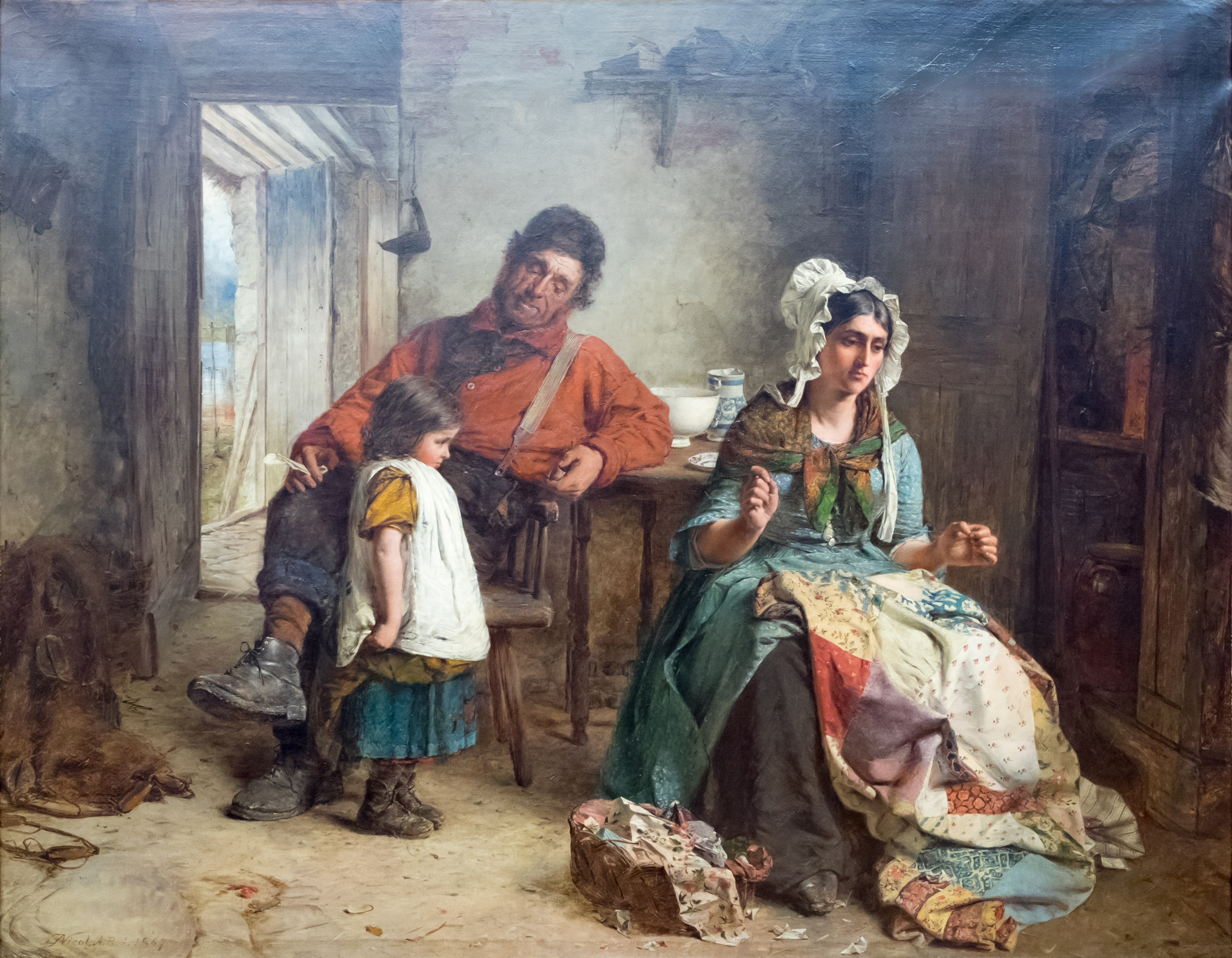
Kiss an' make-it-up (Erskine Nicol) 1867
