= Anna Barriball =

British artist (born 1972)

- Born: 1972 (age 53–54); Plymouth, England
- Education: Winchester School of Art (BA); Chelsea College of Art (MA)
- Occupation: Artist

Anna Barriball (born 1972, Plymouth, UK) is a British artist based in South London.

== Education and career ==
Barriball received her BA degree from Winchester School of Art in 1995 and her MA from the Chelsea College of Art in 2000. Barriball used to work as an invigilator at the Serpentine Gallery.

Barriball works in a variety of media, including paint, pencil, ink, found photographs and video projections. Her talent was first spotted in the New Contemporaries exhibition in 2000, and she has had gallery representation from Frith Street Gallery, London since leaving college.

In 2008, Barriball launched a poster campaign on the escalators of the London Underground, encouraging acts of self-reflection.

== Exhibitions ==
Barriball has shown work internationally, including a recent major retrospective of her work at Art Centre Pasquart in Biel, Switzerland (2018). Other solo exhibitions include Fade, Frith Street Gallery, London (2019), Anna Barriball & Hannelore van Dijck, Be-Part, Waregem (2017), New Works, Frith Street Gallery, London (2016), Museum Villa Stuck, Munich (2013), The Fruitmarket Gallery, Edinburgh (2012), MK Gallery, Milton Keynes (2011), Frith Street Gallery, London (2009), The New Art Gallery, Walsall (2006), Gasworks, London (2005) and Recognition: Anna Barriball and David Musgrave, Arnolfini, Bristol (2003).

Her work has also featured in numerous group exhibitions, including, most recently, Constellations: Highlights from the Nation's Collection of Modern Art, Tate Liverpool (2019), Summer Breeze: An Ensemble of Prints, Frith Street Gallery, London (2018), Find your world in ours, Ikon Gallery, Birmingham (2018), Double Take. The Photographer's Gallery, London (2016), The Bottom Line. Stedelijk Museum voor Actuele Kunst (SMAK), Ghent (2015), Drawing Now, Albertina Museum, Vienna (2015), Silver, Frith Street Gallery, London and Slow Looking: contemporary drawing, Tate Collections (2012).

== Collections ==
Barriball's work is held in numerous private and public collections including four works held in the collection of the Tate Gallery. Other collections include The Arts Council Collection, London, The British Council Collection, London, The Government Art Collection, UK, Herning Museum, Herning, Denmark Hiscox Collection, Kunstmuseum Basel, Leeds Museums and Galleries, Pasquart Art Centre, Biel/Bienne, RISD Museum, Rhode Island, USA, UBS Art Collection, Frederick R. Weisman Art Foundation and The Whitworth, Manchester.

== Publications ==
- Iverson, Margaret, Felicity Lunn and Anna Barriball (2018), Anna Barriball, Art Centre Pasquart, Biel/Bienne, Switzerland, Verlag für moderne Kunst. ISBN 978-3-903228-76-4
- Anna Barriball: Richochet #7 (2013) Villa Stuck, Germany. ISBN 978-3-923244-31-7
- Anna Barriball (2012) The Fruitmarket Gallery, Edinburgh & MK Gallery, Milton Keynes. ISBN 978-1-908612-01-4

== See also ==
- Jessica Voorsanger, Mystery Train project, Art on the Underground
