= Peter Liversidge =

British artist

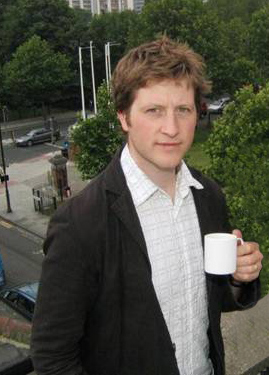
- Liversidge in 2009
- Born: 1973 (age 52–53); Lincoln, England
- Occupation: Artist

Peter Liversidge (born 1973) is a British contemporary artist notable for his diverse artistic practice and use of proposals.

== Personal life ==
Peter Liversidge studied Fine Art in Exeter at the University of Plymouth and film and photography at Montana State University-Bozeman. He moved to London in 1996 where he now lives.

== Work ==
Over the course of the last 25 years, using an Olivetti typewriter, Liversidge has created proposals for exhibitions that range from the simple to the impossible. He experiments with what he describes as the "notion of creativity", often realised as objects, performances, or happenings over the course of an exhibition. Liversidge says of his proposals that: "...it's important that some of the proposals are actually realized, but no more so that the others that remain only as text on a piece of A4 paper. In a sense they are all possible and the bookwork that collates the proposals allows the reader to curate their own show, and because of its size and scale the bookwork allows an individual to interact with each of the proposals on their own terms, one to one."

He draws inspiration not just from artists such as On Kawara, Fischli and Weiss, but also from artists such as Joseph Cornell and the Reverend Howard Finster, as well as inveterate tinkerers like his own grandfathers. Liversidge is driven by the generative notion of creativity and the idea that art is most successful when it exists slightly outside of formalist notions of fine art. The physical objects Liversidge produces often include banal, everyday materials that are repurposed or co-opted for his use. His work, as seen in a lot of his proposals, requires the presence of the viewer and their interpretation of the proposals to complete the aesthetic experience.

Liversidge has worked with, and exhibited at, Tate Liverpool in 2008, the Centre d'Art Santa Mònica, Barcelona in 2008, Bloomberg SPACE, London in 2009 and the Scottish National Gallery of Modern Art in 2010. He has also developed projects for Cab Gallery, the Frieze Art Fair, (with Ingleby Gallery), the Europalia Festival in 2007, Art Basel, Miami, in 2009 and Edinburgh's Sculpture Park, Jupiter Artland, also in 2009.

His performances, such as Gin Stand, Plum Bread and Embossing Bank Notes present the viewers with a piece of work to take away with them. Another aspect of Liversidge's work is sending various objects through the post. "For Peter Liversidge the postal service is also a collaborator in the work. The attached post labels and alterations are like contributions to the piece."

He has also created video projections for the bands Wires Under Tension and Balmorhea. In April 2012, Liversidge created the stage design and projection backdrop for Low at the Royal Festival Hall as a specific proposal. He again worked in collaboration with the band on their 2013 tour, creating the stage design and projection at London's Barbican Centre in April 2013. In October 2014, Liversidge collaborated with musicians Julia Kent and Rachel Grimes on 11 new compositions to mark the end of his exhibition, dopplegänger, at The MAC in Belfast.

In 2015, Liversidge created the cover for the album Ones and Sixes by the band Low. He worked with the band again to create the cover for their 2018 album Double Negative.

For the opening of the Tate Modern extension in June 2016, Liversidge presented a choral piece for 500 singers.

== Selected published proposals ==
- Proposals for Bonniers Konsthall, 2018. (ISBN 9789197756655)
- Proposals for the Government Art Collection, 2017. (ISBN 9780951646861)
- Proposals for Nils Frahm, 2016. (ISBN 9780952734147)
- Proposals for the Aldrich Contemporary Art Museum, 2016. (ISBN 9780692687529)
- Proposals for the residents of Sceaux Gardens, 2015. (ISBN 9781898461500)
- Proposals for Reykjavik, 2014. (ISBN 9789935420510)
- Proposals for basis, 2014. (ISBN 9783981248722)
- Proposals for Frome, 2014. (ISBN 9780956700254)
- Proposals for The Royal London Hospital, 2014. (ISBN 9780954953010)
- Proposals for Printed Matter, Inc., 2014. (ISBN 9780894390753)
- Proposals for Santarcangelo, 2013. (ISBN 9780956669254)
- Whitechapel Proposals, 2013. (ISBN 9780956669247)
- Proposals for Kiasma, 2012. (ISBN 9789515334114)
- Proposals for The Flag Club, 2012. (ISBN 9789490673093)
- Proposals for Huntley, 2011. (ISBN 9781907115066)
- Proposals for Sean Kelly Gallery, 2011. (ISBN 9780966215847)
- Proposals for the Scottish National Gallery of Modern Art, 2010. (ISBN 9780955348990)
- Proposals for Town Hall Hotels & Apartments, 2010. (ISBN 9780956562104)
- Ingleby Proposals, 2010. (ISBN 9780955348976)
- Bloomberg Proposals, 2009. (ISBN 9780955348952)
- Jupiter Proposals, 2009. (ISBN 9780955348945)
- Proposals for Liverpool, 2008. (ISBN 9781846312052)
- Fair Proposals, 2007. (ISBN 9780955348914)
- Festival Proposals, 2006. (ISBN 9780955348907)
- Proposals 1997–2005, 2005.

== Selected publications ==
- Peter Liversidge - Surface Mail (or The Limitations of Magic), 2017.
- Twofold, 2016. (ISBN 9783775741200)
- Selected Proposals, 2013. (ISBN 9780956669261)
- What You'd Expect, 2004. (ISBN 9780954911904)
