= If Lucy Fell (band) =

Portuguese post-hardcore/mathcore band

- Origin: Portugal
- Genres: Post-hardcore; Experimental; Mathcore
- Years active: 2004 - Present
- Labels: Rastilho Records; Lockjaw Records; Aloud Music
- Members: Makoto Yagyu; Rui Carvalho; Pedro Cobrado; Hélio Morais
- Website: Official Homepage

If Lucy Fell is a post-hardcore/mathcore band from Lisbon, Portugal

== History ==
If Lucy Fell was formed in 2004.

The first demo CD was released in 2005 and with it, If Lucy Fell started touring through all the country, calling the interest of Rastilho Records in releasing their first long play. Later in that year, the band, signs also with Lockjaw Records, for the UK edition.

In 2006, If Lucy Fell started to tour all over Europe in order to promote their first album, You Make Me Nervous. In 2007, they also did a Spanish tour.

In January 2008, Zebra Dance was released.

== Current members ==
- Makoto Yagyu - vocals
- Rui Carvalho - guitar
- Pedro "Gaza" Cobrado - bass
- Hélio Morais - drums
- João "Shela" Pereira - keyboards

== Discography ==
- if lucy fell (2005) - Demo
- You Make Me Nervous (2005) - Full Length
- Zebra Dance (2008) - Full Length
