= Paul Stolper Gallery =

Coordinates: 51.5179°N 0.1259°W

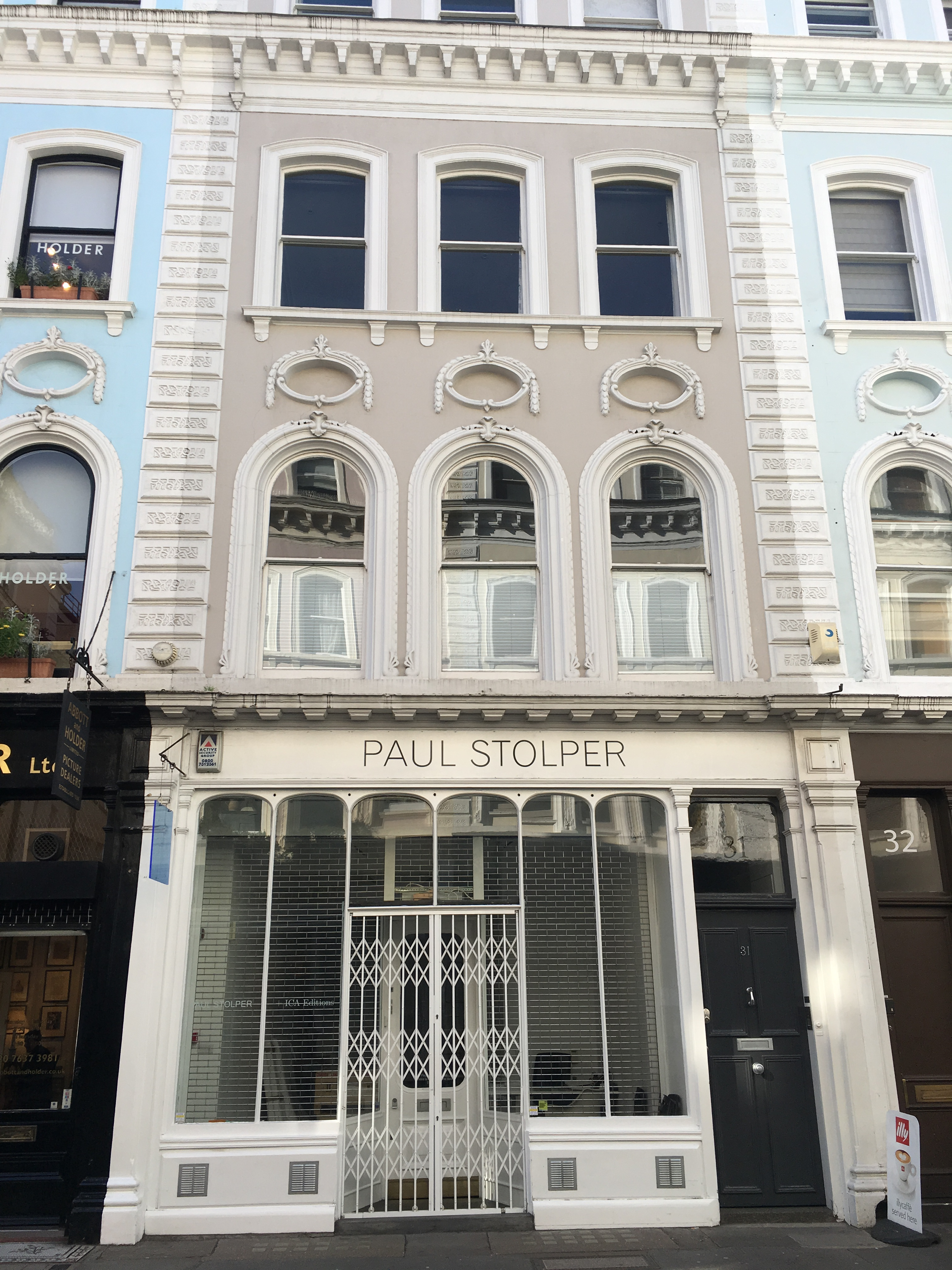
Paul Stolper Gallery, February 2019

Paul Stolper Gallery is a contemporary art gallery in Museum Street, Bloomsbury, London. It was established in 1998.
