= Bob and Roberta Smith =

British artist, writer, and musician

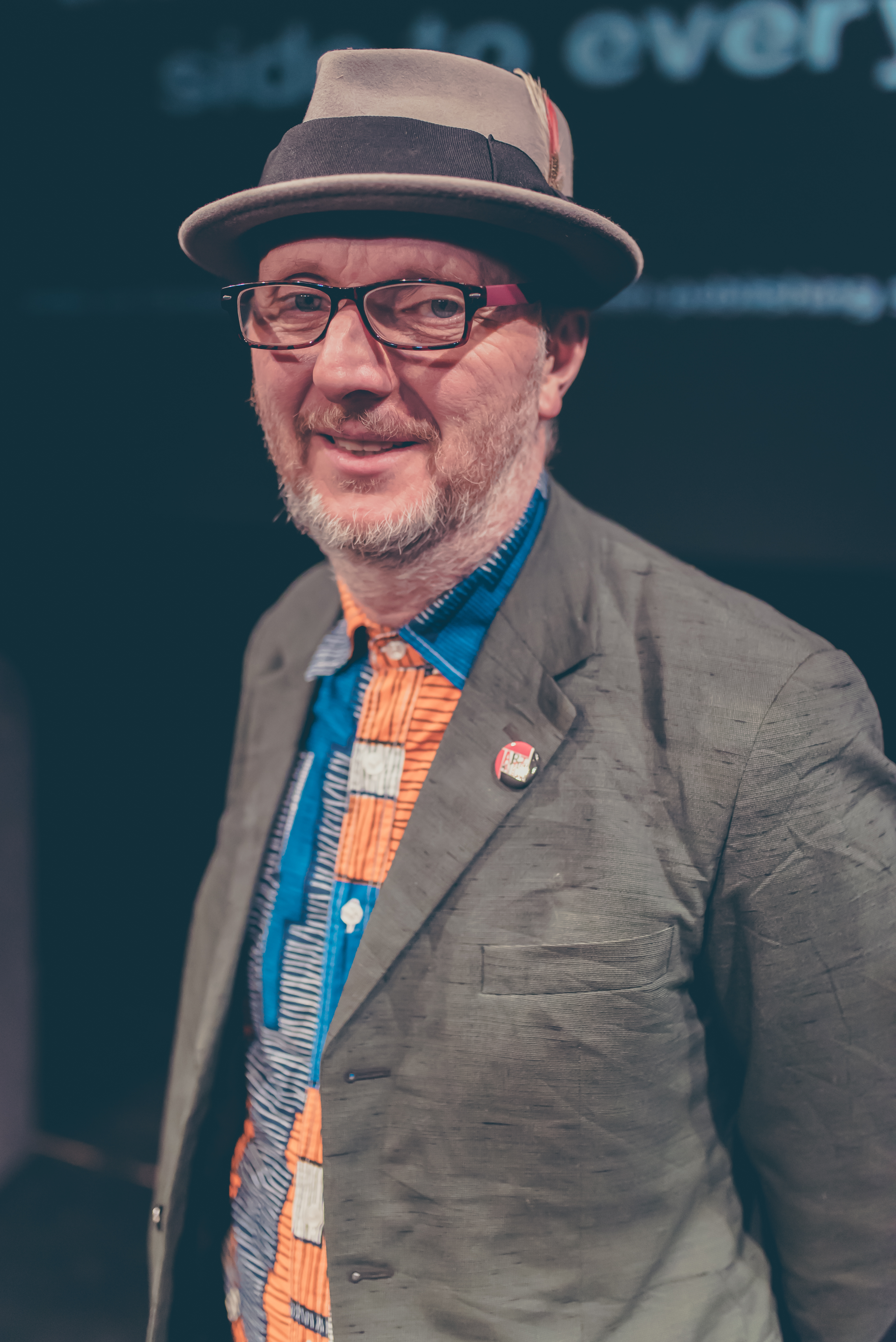
- Brill in 2017
- Born: Patrick Brill; 1963 (age 62–63); Reading, Berkshire, England
- Education: University of Reading; Goldsmiths College
- Occupation: Artist
- Spouse: Jessica Voorsanger

Patrick Brill OBE RA (born 1963), better known by his pseudonym Bob and Roberta Smith, is a British contemporary artist, writer, author, musician, art education advocate, and keynote speaker. He is known for his "slogan" art, is an associate professor at the School of Art, Architecture and Design at London Metropolitan University and has curated public art projects such as Art U Need. He was curator for the 2006 Peace Camp and created the 2013 Art Party to promote contemporary art and advocacy. His works have been exhibited and are in collections in Europe and the United States. Brill co-founded The Ken Ardley Playboys and hosts the Make Your Own Damn Music radio show.

== Life and work ==
Patrick Brill is the son of landscape painter Frederick Brill (1920–1984), head of the Chelsea Art School from 1965 to 1979, and his wife, the artist Deirdre Borlase. He has a sister who is a psychiatric nurse, Roberta. He graduated from the University of Reading and received a scholarship during that time to The British School at Rome. He then obtained his Master of Arts at Goldsmiths College, London.

Brill is married to fellow artist and Goldsmiths College alumna, Jessica Voorsanger, also a contemporary artist and lecturer.

Brill was appointed Officer of the Order of the British Empire (OBE) in the 2017 New Year Honours for services to the arts.

== Careers ==
=== Art ===
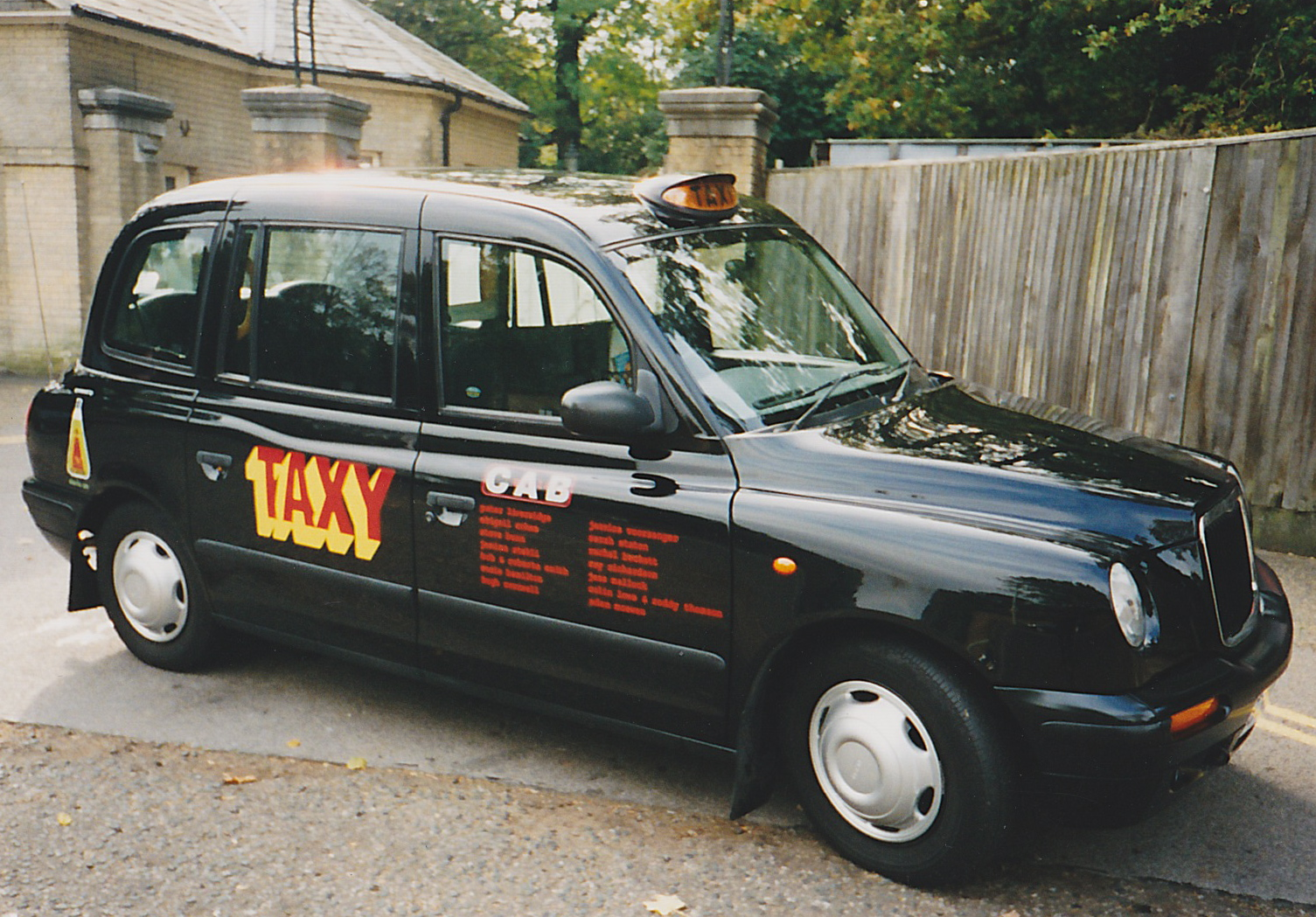
Taxy (1999) by Bob and Roberta Smith, a work from the Cab Gallery

Brill is commonly known as Bob and Roberta Smith in his artistic career. The pseudonym has been retained from the short lived period when he worked with his sister Roberta.

Smith paints slogans in a brightly coloured lettering style on banners and discarded boards of wood and exhibits them in galleries of contemporary art across the world. The slogans are usually humorous musing on art, politics, popular culture, Britain and the world in general and they often support his activist campaigns, such as his 2002 amnesty on bad art at Pierogi Gallery, New York.

Noted for sign painting, Smith also makes sculpture using cement, as in his 2005 Cement Soup Kitchen at Beaconsfield Gallery, London. A sculpture he proposed was shortlisted for the fourth plinth in Trafalgar Square, London.

[Smith] grew attracted to postures of amateurism and failure. His more recent work has suggested an interest in the utopian impulse of art as an agent for social change, although this often seems hedged with doubt or irony

— Morgan Falconer

In March 2005, he was commissioned to curate a series of five public art projects in the Thames Gateway housing estates of Essex. The projects were collectively named Art U Need and were documented in a diary-format book by Smith in 2007. Writing of a launch event in "glittering Notting Hill Gate" (i.e. in fashionable and central Kensington), Lynn Barber said of Smith: "It was a startlingly unsuitable subject for such a glossy audience, but he held them spellbound. I see him as a sort of Ian Dury of the art world, someone who keeps on trucking, doing his own thing, making absolutely no concessions to fashion or marketability, but generally giving pleasure to everyone who comes across him."

A feature documentary about the work of Bob and Roberta Smith, Make Your Own Damn Art: the world of Bob and Roberta Smith, directed by John Rogers, premiered at the East End Film Festival in 2012.

In 2013, he was on the Museum of the Year selection panel. He is on the Tate board as an artist member.

In October 2021, Brill contributed to World Wildlife Fund's campaign, Art For Your World.

=== Speaker, writer and advocate ===
He has spoken as an advocate for art education and the arts and has been a keynote speaker at symposia and conferences. A recent example of his gift for merging art and politics was illustrated in the 2006 exhibition, "Peace Camp." Smith took part in and curated the show held at The Brick Lane Gallery that explored artists' perceptions of peace. Gavin Turk, Wolfgang Tillmans, and more than 100 other artists were featured. He created a project, the Art Party, in 2013 to make contemporary art more accessible, demonstrate its ability to influence meaningful conversation and political thought. It was launched at the Pierogi Gallery in New York and at the Hales Gallery. An Arts Council sponsored a two-day conference at Crescent Arts in North Yorkshire that year. It brought more than 2000 people who attended discussions of art education in schools and lectures, listened to music and attended performances.

Brill writes for The Guardian.

=== Educator ===
Brill is an associate professor at the School of Art, Architecture and Design at London Metropolitan University, teaching undergraduate and post-graduate students. He leads the Master of Fine Arts programme, researches and co-leads with Oriana Fox of the Public Acts studio, and tutors in fine art.

=== Musician ===
Brill performs music, often with a group he co-founded, The Ken Ardley Playboys, who had their first 45 released by Billy Childish on his label Hangman Records. Brill hosts The Bob & Roberta Smith Radio Show called Make Your Own Damn Music on Resonance FM.

=== 2015 election ===
Brill stood in the Surrey Heath constituency in the 2015 general election, under his working name, Bob and Roberta Smith. He won the fewest votes in the constituency, receiving 273 votes (0.5%) and losing his deposit. The seat was won by incumbent MP Michael Gove.

== Collections ==
- Arts Council Collection, London
- British Council, London
- Goss Michael Foundation, Dallas, Texas
- Sammlung Fiede, Aschaffenburg, Germany
- Southampton City Museum & Art Gallery, Southampton, England
- Tate Collection, London
- The New Art Gallery Walsall, Walsall, UK

== Published works ==
Author

- Art u need: my part in the public art revolution. Black Dog Publishing. 2007. ISBN 978-1-906155-16-2.
- Hearing Voices, Seeing Things: A Serpentine Gallery Project : Seven Artists' Projects Exploring Mental Health. Serpentine Gallery. 2006. ISBN 978-1-905190-09-6.
- Hijack Reality: Deptford X: A 'How To' Guide to Organize a Really Top Notch Art Festival. C. T. Editions. 1 July 2009. ISBN 978-0-9547071-2-5.
- Make Your Own Damn Art. London: Black Dog Publishing. 2004.
- We Spy USA. Purgatory Pie Press. 1998.

Co-author

- Matthew Collings; Bob Smith; Roberta Smith (1997). Dont Hate Sculpt: Bob and Roberta Smith. Victor Mount and Chisenhale Gallery, London. Chisenhale Gallery. ISBN 978-1-901066-04-3.
- Bob and Roberta Smith; Esther K. Smith; Dikko Faust (1998). The Archipelago of the Disunited States Showing the Soho Seas. Purgatory Pie Press.
- Billy Childish; Peter Doig; Matthew Higgs; Paul Noble (1996). This Purile Thing. James Pyman, Bob and Roberta Smith. Imprint 93.

== See also ==
- Roberta Smith, American art critic
