= Sarah Staton =

British sculptor (born 1961)

Sarah Staton (born 1961) is a British sculptor. She is head of the sculpture programme at the Royal College of Art.

Sarah Staton was born in 1961. Her work is in the permanent collection of the Tate Gallery.

Staton makes exhibitions, commissioned sculptures for specific sites, furniture and publications. In the late 1980s Staton opened up her Bloomsbury squat as a gallery, and named it Milch. Milch became one of the best known art spaces of its kind at the time. Staton is also known for decorating the lawn of the Serpentine Gallery with a Union flag of smashed bottles.

One of Staton's most well known projects is the Sarah Staton Supastore, a peripatetic shop selling works by up-and-coming contemporaries, unknowns and established artists such as Sol LeWitt, Mike Kelley and Stephen Willats. The Supastore has appeared in Laure Genillard Gallery, the ICA in London, the San Francisco Art Fair, and the Middlesbrough Art Gallery.
