= Jessica Voorsanger =

American painter (born 1965)

- Born: 1965 (age 60–61); New York
- Known for: Painting, performance art, installations
- Movement: Contemporary Art
- Spouse: Patrick Brill, best known as Bob and Roberta Smith
- Website: jessicavoorsanger.co.uk

Jessica Voorsanger (born 1965) is an American artist and academic, living and working in London. She has worked on the "Mystery Train" project for the Institute of Contemporary Arts to make contemporary art more accessible to people with learning disabilities. Her work has been exhibited more than two dozen times with her husband, fellow artist Patrick Brill, best known as Bob and Roberta Smith.

== Early life and education ==
Jessica Voorsanger was born in New York City in 1965 and grew up on the Upper West Side of Manhattan. Two of her grandparents were artists: her father's mother and her mother's father.

She first studied fine art at The Brooklyn Museum Art School in New York from 1982 to 1983 and obtained her Bachelor of Fine Arts at Rhode Island School of Design in 1987. She began graduate studies at Goldsmiths College, London in 1991 and received her Master of Arts in fine art in 1993.

She met Patrick Brill (the artist Bob and Roberta Smith) after graduating from Rhode Island School of Design. When he returned to London, she went with him and they are now married.

=== Artist ===
Voorsanger creates inter-active installations, objects, performances and events that reference pop and celebrity culture. As a child growing up in the 1970s she was enamored with popular sitcom television shows like The Brady Bunch and The Partridge Family, and, as one critic has reported, she believes her interest in the shows planted "the seeds of star adulation" that has influenced her work; and "that these cosy shows were a social glue, offering comfort to a nation traumatised by the Vietnam war and bankruptcy." Her artwork explores stardom, television shows, and fame using a wide range of media, including filmed performances, paintings and sculptures. Journalist Jessica Lack said, "Her brand of celebrity-quick art has occasionally been dismissed as lightweight, with critics overlooking or ignoring the fact that Voorsanger's guileful ability to make work that is as addictive and kitsch as Heat magazine, operates on the same plain as the world she is critiquing."

She particularly is interested in portraying celebrities that she believes have real talent, increasingly relevant with the advent of reality television. In 2008's Star Struck, performers were made up as Cher, Billy Idol, Michael Jackson, Devo, Kurt Cobain, George Harrison, Diana Ross, Morrissey, Paul Weller, David Hockney, Amy Winehouse and Siouxsie Sioux. The mixed media installation projected multiple films of the costumed karaoki performers singing the songs of another artist: David Bowie's Ziggy Stardust was sung by Amy Winehouse. The installation included portraits of the chosen celebrities.

Voorsanger was commissioned to work on an Institute of Contemporary Arts six-month project entitled "Mystery Train." She partnered in 2008 with Art on the Underground and Pursuing Independent Paths (PIP) to make transportation easier to navigate and encourage people with learning disabilities to explore contemporary art venues. PIP students and Voorsanger visited London's museums and galleries, had a behind-the-scenes tour of the Charing Cross Underground station and developed multiple communications media, including "Heads, Bodies, Legs" posters and costumed karaoke games. Each poster has a composite image the head, body and legs of ICA staff, London Underground staff and PIP students. Art educator, Emily Candela commented: "I have enjoyed the sense of exploration that runs through Mystery Train. Travel itself – and London's transport system in particular – served both as inspiration for our projects with Jessica Voorsanger as well as the link between our base at the ICA, PIP's centre in Westminster and the world of galleries and museums that we discovered."

=== Lecturer ===
Voorsanger has lectured since 1997 for Goldsmiths College Masters of Arts program, Sunderland, Camberwell College of Arts, Royal College of Art, and The Slade. From 1998 to 2003, she was a lecturer in pictorial arts at Kent Institute of Art & Design. Since 2003 she has been a part-time lecturer for both the University for the Creative Arts's Fine Art and Research and Wimbledon School of Art's Bachelor of Arts programs. Voorsanger has been an external examiner for the University of East London since 2007.

== Exhibitions ==
She has exhibited widely in the United Kingdom, United States and Germany. She and her husband, Patrick Brill, known as the artist Bob and Roberta Smith, exhibited together more than 2 dozen times. Some of her solo and group exhibitions are:

=== Solo shows ===
- 1998 – Jessica Voorsanger – Wilkinson Gallery, London, England
- 2003 – I Think I Love You – Collective Gallery, Edinburgh, Scotland
- 2007 – The Agony and the Ecstasy – George Rodger Gallery, Maidstone, Kent, England
- 2008 – The Woody Allen Show – Gallery 33, Berlin (closed, 2008)
- 2009 – Crimefighters – Kornhäuschen, Aschaffenburg, Germany
- 2009 – Eastenders – Whitechapel Art Gallery, London, England
- 2011 – Peckham Heroes – Peckham Space, London, England
- 2013 – Jessica Voorsanger – Worldstaronestoppopshop – Kornhäuschen, Aschaffenburg

=== Group exhibitions ===
- 1995 – Lost Property / Trill – W139, Amsterdam
- 1996 – Michael Corris, "Gang Warfare" – Le Consortium, Dijon
- 1998 – Channel 3 – team (gallery, inc.), New York City, NY
- 2000 – Horten und SITE + Gäste - Kunstverein für die Rheinlande und Westfalen, Düsseldorf
- 2001 – Teeth & Trousers – Cell Project Space, London, England
- 2002 – Air Guitar – Cornerhouse, Manchester, England
- 2002 – Air Guitar – Milton Keynes Gallery, Milton Keynes, Buckinghamshire, England
- 2003 – Air Guitar – Angel Row Gallery, Nottingham, England (closed)
- 2003 – Air Guitar – Tullie House Museum, Carlisle, Cumbria, England
- 2003 – Independence – SLG South London Gallery, London, England
- 2004 – The Birthday Party – Collective Gallery, Edinburgh, Scotland
- 2006 – Forward/Backward and Reloading – Island6 Arts Center, Shanghai
- 2006 – Metropolis Rise: New Art From London – temporarycontemporary, London, England
- 2007 – Art Car Boot Fair 2007 – Art Car Boot Fair, London, England
- 2008 – Mapping Correspondence: Mail Art in the 21st Century – The Center for Book Arts, New York City, NY
- 2008 – Starstruck – The New Art Gallery Walsall, Walsall, West Midlands, England
- 2008 – The Famous, the Infamous & the Really Quite Good – Decima Gallery, London, England
- 2008 – The Golden Record – Sounds of Earth – Collective Gallery, Edinburgh, Scotland
- 2009 – Horn of Plenty – Viktor Wynd Fine Art, London, England
- 2009 – Famous – Celebrity(ies) and Visual Art – Künstlerhaus Dortmund, Dortmund
- 2009 – Reg Perfect and the Squeegees – Portman Gallery, London, England
- 2009 – Too Much is Not Enough – Transition Gallery, London, England
- 2009 – Warholesque – Richard Young Gallery, London, England
- 2010 – Sold Out – Elastic Residence, London, England
- 2010 – Stardust Boogie Woogie – Monika Bobinska (former Lounge Gallery), London, England
- 2010 – The House of Fairy Tales – Exquisite Trove – Newlyn Art Gallery, Newlyn, England
- 2010 – The House of Fairy Tales – Millennium, St. Ives, Cornwall, England
- 2010 – Stardust Boogie Woogie – Art Laboratory Berlin, Berlin
- 2010 – Unrealised Potential – Cornerhouse, Manchester, England
- 2011 – Drawing 2011 – Biennial Fundraiser – The Drawing Room, London, England
- 2011 – Fraternise – Beaconsfield, Beaconsfield, England
- 2011 – Pulp Fictions – Transition Gallery, London, England
- 2012 – Adventure – Herrick Gallery, London, England
- 2012 – Plate – Herrick Gallery, London, England
- 2012 – Tainted Love – Meter Room, Coventry, England
- 2012 – Tainted Love – Transition Gallery, London, England
- 2013 – Collage Principle – Kornhäuschen, Aschaffenburg

== See also ==
- Anna Barriball, self-reflection poster campaign for London Underground escalators
