= Flowers Gallery =

Art galleries in the US, UK, and Hong Kong

- Industry: Art gallery
- Founded: February 1968; 57 years ago, in London, UK
- Founder: Angela Flowers
- Headquarters: 21 Cork Street, Mayfair, London, UK
- Number of locations: 4 Galleries (2025)
- Key people: Matthew Flowers (CEO)
- Website: flowersgallery.com

Flowers Gallery, also known as Flowers are two galleries in London (on Cork Street in the West End, and in Shoreditch in the East End), a third in the Chelsea district of New York City, and a fourth in Hong Kong.

The gallery represents over 60 artists and artists' estates, including Glenys Barton, Edward Burtynsky, Elger Esser and Tom Phillips.

== History ==
The first Flowers Gallery was established by Angela Flowers in February 1968 on Lisle Street in London's West End. Later in the 1980s, a new space known as Flowers East opened in the East End. Co-founder and philologist Matthew Flowers, Angela's third son, took over day-to-day running of the business in November 1989. By late 1998, the gallery expanded further with a Los Angeles space, at Bergamot Station known as Flowers West. The formal West End quarters on Cork Street was until Spring 2010 known as Flowers Central. In 2002 Flowers East moved from Hackney into a 12,000 sq foot industrial space in Shoreditch.

In 2003 the U.S. gallery relocated from Los Angeles to Madison Avenue in New York City, and in 2009 moved to its then location on West 20th Avenue in Chelsea. Similarly to the two galleries in London, Flowers West is no longer in use.

== Artists ==
Represented artists and artists' estates include:

- Glenys Barton (since 1974)
- Glen Baxter
- Edward Burtynsky
- Aleah Chapin
- Movana Chen
- Edmund Clark
- Bernard Cohen
- Diana Copperwhite
- Victoria Crowe
- William Crozier
- Ken Currie
- Elger Esser
- Terry Frost
- David Hepher
- Nicola Hicks
- Peter Howson
- Lucy Jones
- Nadav Kander
- Michael Kidner Estate
- John Kirby
- John Loker
- Janelle Lynch
- Tom Phillips
- Robert Polidori
- Bianca Raffaella (since 2024)
- Simon Roberts
- Michael Sandle
- Tai-Shan Schierenberg
- Aida Tomescu
- Shen Wei
- Michael Wolf
- Stuart Pearson Wright

Formerly represented artists and estates include:

- Stephen Chambers
- Patrick Hughes
- Jane Joseph
