= Matthew Flowers =

British contemporary art dealer

- Born: 1956 (age 69–70)
- Occupation: Gallerist
- Parents: Adrian Flowers (father); Angela Flowers (mother)

Matthew Flowers (born 1956) is a British contemporary art dealer and gallerist. He is the managing director of Flowers Gallery, which has spaces in London and Hong Kong and a team in New York. Throughout his career he has been on boards and committees of international art fairs and arts institutions and since 2008 he has been a non-executive Director of DACS (visual artists’ rights management organisation). Flowers is also a keyboard player and vocalist.

== Early life ==
Matthew Flowers is the son of Angela Flowers (art dealer) and Adrian Flowers (photographer). He has two brothers and two sisters.

== Music career (1974-1983) ==
Flowers was the keyboard player, co-songwriter and manager of the rock band Sore Throat. Sore Throat made several records and appeared on Revolver presented by Peter Cook in 1978 and The Old Grey Whistle Test in 1980. He also played in Killer Whales, Mattandan and Blue Zoo. Blue Zoo's song, "Cry Boy Cry" was a UK top 20 hit in 1982, and led to two appearances on Top of the Pops.

== Career in art ==
Flowers began working intermittently at the gallery in 1970. He assisted his mother Angela Flowers from 1975 and moved into the business full-time in 1983, when he became gallery manager. The Gallery expanded in 1988 when opening Flowers East in Hackney. Matthew Flowers set up Flowers Graphics, an international print publisher, in 1988 and became Managing Director of Angela Flowers Gallery in 1989. In 1991 Flowers Gallery expanded further with an 18,000 sq feet space called London Fields. In 1997 the Gallery opened Flowers West in Santa Monica (California, USA) and Flowers Central on Cork Street (London, UK). The gallery later expanded to Hong Kong, opening a space there in 2020. Matthew set up a publishing company focusing on artist monographs and survey exhibitions in 1995. From 2005 to 2007 he published State of Art newspaper with editor Mike von Joel.

His gallery has represented artists, including Eduardo Paolozzi, Stephen Chambers, Tom Phillips, Ken Currie, Nicola Hicks, Peter Howson, John Keane, Patrick Hughes, Alison Watt, Lucy Jones and Richard Smith.

In addition to representing contemporary artists Flowers has overseen many group and survey exhibitions such as Artist of the Day, a platform for emerging artists since 1983, Small is Beautiful, British Abstract Art, British Figurative Art, Contemporary Portraits, Badge Art, and The Thatcher Years: an Artistic Retrospective. In addition to his work at Flowers Gallery, Flowers has served in governance roles within the visual-arts sector, including as a non-executive director of the Design and Artists Copyright Society (DACS).
