= Forget and Forgive =

Forget and Forgive may refer to:

- Forget and Forgive (film), a 2014 Canadian television film
- Forget and Forgive (play), an 1827 play by James Kenney

== See also ==
- Forgive and Forget (disambiguation)
