= Emma Fay =

English artist

Emma Dawes (born 1987), known professionally as Emma Fay, is an English visual artist specialising in body painting and makeup. Her painted human bodies are documented through photography and film, as well as being created as live installations. Fay has created artwork for commercial domains and her own fine art practice.

== Career ==
=== Fine art ===
==== The Marvels of Nature ====
In 2014, Fay created a series of animal-based artworks that are collectively known as The Marvels of Nature. The artworks combine her body painting technique with the physical practice of contortionism and explore the idea of evolution. The series has been featured in The Guardian and The Telegraph.

==== Ridiculous ====
In January 2017, Fay released the Ridiculous series, a collection of 10 artworks devised in collaboration with Juliette Burton and Adam Pearson. Fay stated that the series looked to challenge the language used to describe the body in modern-day society through the visual portrayal of phrases such as ‘bingo wings’, ‘camel toe’ and ‘trout pout’: "The perception of body image is a subject that is prevalent in society today. With an aim to address the challenges created by media culture and to stimulate conversation about how the human form should be described, Ridiculous is contemporary, current and provocative." The series was exhibited at the Attenborough Arts Centre in Leicester, UK in Spring 2017.

==== Portraits of the Mind ====
In March 2018, Fay released Portraits of the Mind, a series of 15 artworks that strive to challenge perception. One artwork from the series, Cloud Walker, was featured in The Times. The full series was exhibited at the Attenborough Arts Centre throughout March 2018.

=== Commercial work ===
Fay has been commissioned to create artwork for commercial and advertorial use as well as for charities. She has worked on campaigns for Macmillan Cancer Support, PETA, UN-Water, Born Free Foundation, Rethinkyourmind and World Toilet Day.

In 2014, Fay created a series of three artworks for Macmillan Cancer Support for the promotion of their annual World's Biggest Coffee Morning event. The series featured contortionists painted into a teapot, cup and saucer, and mug and cupcake.

In July 2015, Fay was commissioned by UK Shark Week to create artwork featuring diver, Tom Daley, painted into a shark to raise awareness of ocean conservation.

In November 2015, PETA worked with Fay to produce advertorial artwork that highlighted the treatment of crocodiles and alligators bred for the fashion accessory industry. Fay said: "I am a vegan myself. I have always wanted to do as much as I can to raise awareness for animals. So for me it was a privilege to help the campaign.” The campaign featured singer Joss Stone.

In 2016, the National Lottery commissioned Fay to create six artworks featuring seven of the British Olympic and Paralympic teams. Amber Hill, Moe Sbihi, Pam Relph, Robbie Grabarz, Josef Craig, Max Whitlock and Jade Jones were painted as Brazilian animals in recognition of the 2016 Summer Olympics held in Rio de Janeiro.

In October 2016, Fay worked with Sky Atlantic on a live stunt promoting the launch of HBO drama, Westworld. As the lead artist, Fay directed and painted a cast of 20 models as humanoid robots that were then photographed against a backdrop of iconic London attractions.

In August 2017, Rowse Honey commissioned Fay to produce a bee design with 3 models. The resulting campaign imagery was featured in The Times.

=== Enter Edem company ===
Fay is the artistic director of theatre production company, Enter Edem.
