= Robert Heller =

Robert Heller may refer to:

- Robert Heller (magician) (1826–1878), English magician, mentalist, and musician
- Robert Heller (journalist) (1932–2012), British management journalist and management consultant
- H. Robert Heller (born 1940), American economist and governor of the Federal Reserve System
