= Angela Flowers =

British gallerist (1932–2023)

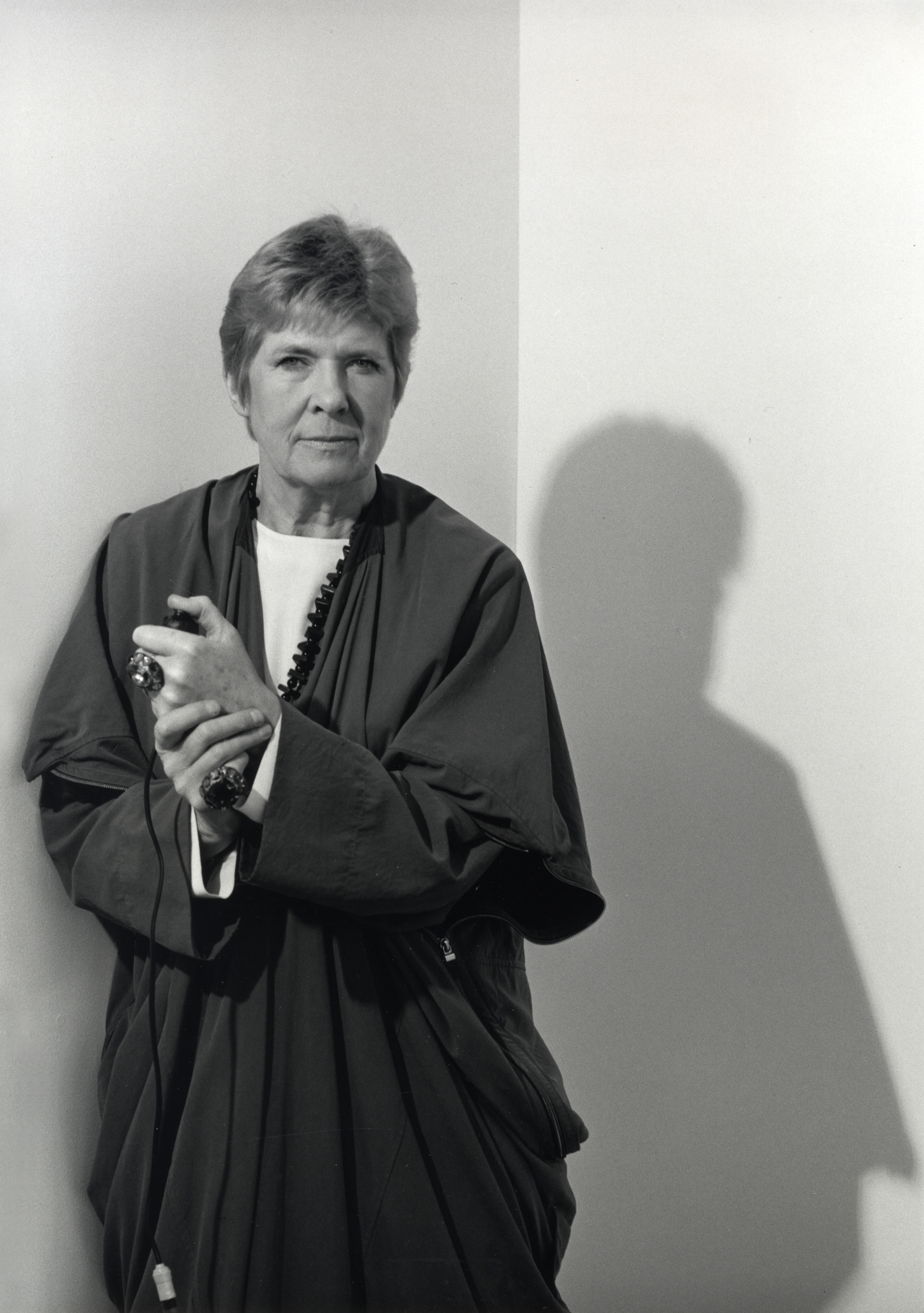
- Angela Flowers (self-portrait; she is holding the trigger) in 2012
- Born: Angela Mary Holland; 19 December 1932; Croydon, England
- Died: 11 August 2023 (aged 90)
- Occupation: Gallerist
- Spouses: Adrian Flowers (m. 1952; div. 1972); Robert Heller (m. 2003; died 2012)
- Children: 5, including Matthew
- Website: flowersgallery.com

Angela Mary Flowers (née Holland; 19 December 1932 – 11 August 2023) was a British gallerist who founded Flowers Gallery, a commercial art gallery that today operates in London, New York City, and Hong Kong. A director of the gallery, she was based between Ramsgate in Kent and Cork in Ireland.

== Education and career ==
Born on 19 December 1932 in Croydon, Angela Holland was the elder of two daughters of Geoffrey and Olive Holland. Her great grandfather founded The Croydon Advertiser. During World War II, her father worked as a fireman on the River Thames, then in military intelligence and her mother worked in a munitions factory in Herefordshire. During this time, Angela was sent to a boarding school founded by war artist Eric Kennington. She then went to Westonbirt School in Kent, followed by Wychwood School in Oxford and a diploma at the Webber Douglas Academy of Dramatic Art in London. She later worked as an au pair in Paris.

In 1952, aged 19, she met fashion and portrait photographer Adrian Flowers, marrying him seven weeks later. In an interview she recalled, "I met Adrian in the January and proposed to him in the February because it was leap year ... and we got married a few weeks later." She studied drama and music at the Guildhall School of Music and Drama in London, performed some music and acting work - she played a Dagenham Girl Piper in the first Benny Hill film, Who Done It? (1956) - and also worked in advertising.

Her arts career began following a family holiday in St Ives, where they met many of the resident artists. Her husband began taking pictures of the artworks and artists for catalogues and together they began collecting art, with a particular focus on emerging British artists.

=== Flowers Gallery ===
Flowers Gallery opened in central London in 1970 in an attic of the Artists' International Association in Lisle Street. The gallery had two principles, Flowers said: "I would only show living artists; and nothing pre-1952." The gallery's first show featured Patrick Hughes, whom Flowers continued to represent for 48 years; printmaker Tom Phillips had his first solo show at Flowers, also in 1970. The following year, in 1971, the gallery hosted a first solo show by Fionnuala Boyd and Leslie Evans, and in 1973, it hosted Opening, a show by feminist Penny Slinger dealing with food and eroticism.

After the AIA disbanded in 1971, the gallery had moved to Portland Mews; in 1979, it moved to Tottenham Mews. In 1988, Flowers moved the gallery to an industrial building in the Hackney district of east London, later returning to central London by opening a second gallery in Cork Street. In 2002, the east London gallery moved to Shoreditch.

Flowers expanded internationally in 1997, opening a U.S. gallery in Los Angeles, then moving it to New York in 2003. Located initially in Madison Avenue, it moved to West 20th street in Chelsea in 2009.

From December 2012 to February 2013, the Shoreditch gallery hosted an exhibition, Angela Flowers at 80, marking her 80th birthday. By 2016, Flowers East had a staff of 24 and a turnover of more than £6m.

== Personal life ==
Angela and Adrian Flowers had four children. Matthew Flowers, her second son, worked on and off for the gallery from 1970 until 1983 when he moved to the business full time. He became its managing director in 1989. Flowers's youngest son, Daniel married sculptor Nicola Hicks, a long-time gallery client.

In 1970, Angela Flowers met the writer and business journalist Robert Heller. Already an art collector, he helped manage the gallery. She and Adrian Flowers divorced in 1972, and she and Heller stayed together. In 1999, she said "We've been together 29 years now and I'm still hoping to get married. Perhaps I'll ask him next year, which is a leap year." They married in 2003 and he died in 2012, having earlier developed Parkinson's disease; in 2009, they had moved from Highgate in north London to Henley-on-Thames in Oxfordshire.

Angela and Robert had a daughter, Rachel Heller, born on 15 September 1973 with Down's syndrome. Rachel became an artist but was represented by another gallery.

=== Death ===
Flowers died on 11 August 2023, at age 90.
