= Adrian Flowers =

British photographer

Self-portrait.

Adrian John Flowers (11 July 1926 – 18 May 2016) was a British photographer known for his portraits of celebrities that included Twiggy, Paul McCartney, Linda McCartney and Vanessa Redgrave.

== Early life ==
Flowers was educated at Sherborne School, Dorset, the son of a former Indian Army officer. His mother was a Christian Scientist.

== Career ==
Flowers took exams at the Institute of British Photography in 1950 and set up a studio in Dover Street the same year. He later had a studio in Tite Street, Chelsea. He was known for his advertising work, particularly for Benson & Hedges cigarettes, and also for his portraits of celebrities that included Twiggy, Paul McCartney, Linda McCartney and Vanessa Redgrave.

Flowers' assistants included Terence Donovan and Brian Duffy, and Chris Killip.

== Family ==
Flowers married Angela Holland, who established Angela Flowers Gallery in 1970 in London. They had four children: Adam, Matthew, Dan and Francesca. Matthew Flowers is the contemporary art dealer who now runs Flowers Gallery. In 1985, Adrian Flowers married a second time to Francoise Lina, a French conference interpreter, and they lived until his death in southwest France.
