= Glen Baxter (artist) =

English artist (1944–2026)

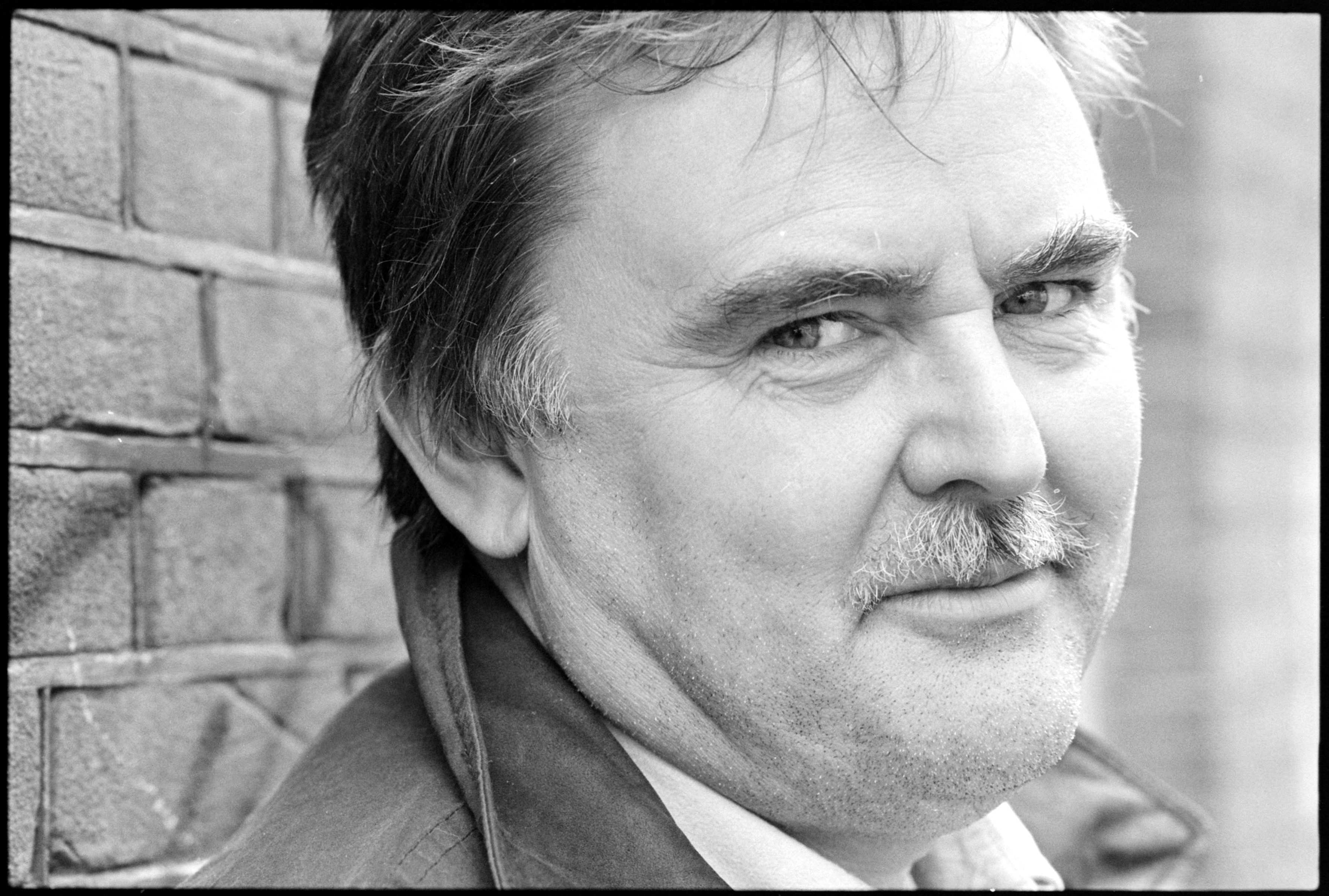
- Baxter in 1992
- Born: 4 March 1944; Leeds, England
- Died: 29 March 2026 (aged 82)
- Education: Leeds College of Art
- Known for: Draughtsman; artist

Glen Baxter (4 March 1944 – 29 March 2026) was an English draughtsman and visual artist, noted for his absurdist drawings and an overall effect often resembling literary nonsense.

== Life and career ==
Born in Leeds, Baxter was trained at Leeds College of Art (1960–5). He was a teacher at the V&A (1967–74). His first solo exhibition was held at New York's Gotham Book Mart Gallery. Baxter's artwork has appeared in The New Yorker, Vanity Fair and The Independent on Sunday. His images and their corresponding captions employ art and language inspired by pulp fiction and adventure comics with intellectual jokes and references. His simple line-drawings often feature cowboys, gangsters, explorers and schoolchildren, who utter incongruous intellectual statements regarding art and philosophy. One of his best known satirical works, The Impending Gleam, was first published in 1981.

Baxter lived and worked in London. With Flowers Gallery, Baxter had a number of solo shows including Furtive Loomings (2017), Tofu Walk With Me (2015), and Glen Baxter: The Soul in Torment, Parts I & II (2012).

In August 2014, Baxter was one of over 200 public figures who were signatories to a letter to The Guardian expressing their hope that Scotland would vote to remain part of the United Kingdom in September's referendum on that issue.

In May 2016, The New York Review of Books published a collection of Baxter's work titled, Almost Completely Baxter: New and Selected Blurtings.

Baxter died from carcinomatosis on 29 March 2026, aged 82.

== Bibliography ==
- Atlas (1979)
- 5 x 5 (1981) with Ian Breakwell, Ivor Cutler, Anthony Earnshaw, Jeff Nuttall
- The Impending Gleam (1981)
- His Life: The Years of Struggle (1983) (translated as Zijn leven, de jaren van strijd, 1986)ISBN 0-500-01307-1
- Atlas, Le dernier terrain vague (1983)
- The Impending Gleam Thames & Hudson, (1985)
- Jodpurs in the Quantocks (1986)
- The Festive Ordeal De Harmonie Amsterdam (1986)
- L'heure du thé (1990)
- Welcome to the Weird World of Glen Baxter (1989)
- Ma vie: le jeunes années (1990)
- The Billiard Table Murders (1990)
- Glen Baxter Returns to Normal (1992) (translated as Retour à la normale, 1992)
- The Collected Blurtings of Baxter (1994)
- The Further Blurtings of Baxter (1994)
- The Wonder Book of Sex (1995) (translated as Wundersame Welt der Erotik, 1996, and Le livre de l'amour, 1997).
- Glen Baxter's Gourmet Guide (1997)
- Blizzards of Tweed (1999)
- Meurtres a la Table de Billiard (2000)
- Trundling Grunts (2002)
- The Unhinged World of Glen Baxter (2002)
- Loomings Over the Suet (2004)
- Le safari historico-gastronomique en Poitou-Charentes. Poitiers: Éditions Atlantique, 2010. ISBN 978-2-911320-41-5. In French and English. Preface by Alberto Manguel.
