= Nigel Hall (sculptor) =

British sculptor (born 1943)

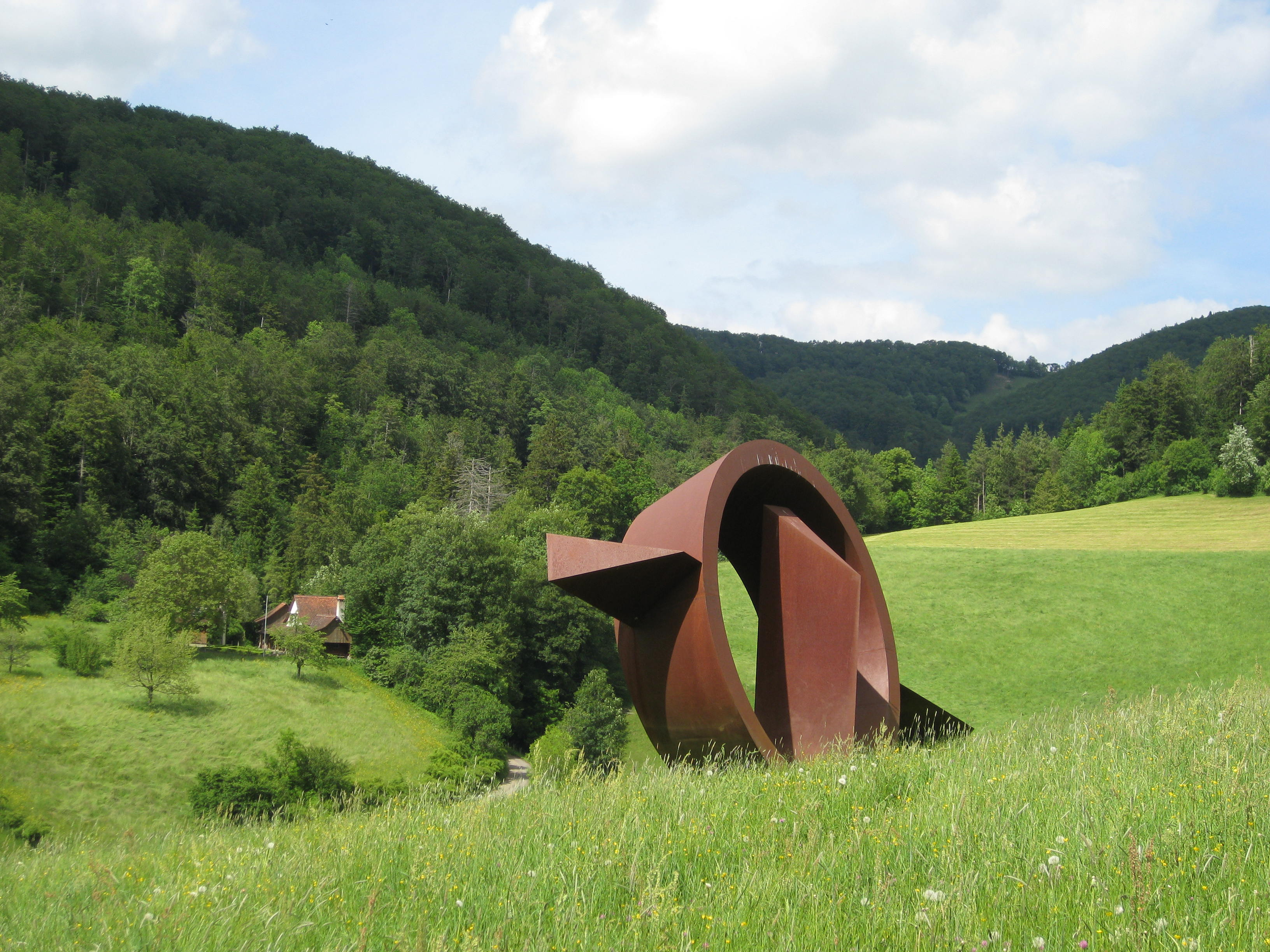
Soglio sculpture at Schoenthal

Nigel Hall RA (born 30 August 1943 in Bristol) is an English sculptor and a draughtsman.

== Life ==
Hall's grandfather was a stonemason working on churches and cathedrals and Hall was able to observe this work and the carving of stone was to influence his sculptures and drawings. He studied at the West of England College of Art, Bristol from 1960 to 1964 and at the Royal College of Art, London from 1964 to 1967. A Harkness Fellowship took him to United States, to Canada and Mexico from 1967 to 1969. Only later, back in London, he travelled to Japan, Korea and Switzerland. From 1971 to 1981 Hall was a lecturer and external examiner of the Royal College of Art, London and ran the MA sculpture course at Chelsea College of Art and Design.

Hall lives and works in London. He was elected to the Royal Academy of Arts in 2003.

== Works ==
Hall has always created single and multi-coloured drawings. Since the 1960s he has also worked on sculptures and spatial structures. The interplay of shadows and balance in the works mean that their placement, whether indoors or outside, is important. Hall finds the landscape of the Mojave Desert and Swiss Alps spaces of silence and vastness. This influences his drawings and he keeps a diary of sketches on his frequent travels. His drawings represent more than half of his total work.

His location-based installation art is internationally known. A two-part wall relief in painted and gilded wood at the entrance of Providence Tower, Dallas (1989), a wall sculpture at the entrance to the Australian National Gallery, Canberra (1982), and his largest sculpture, a free-standing steel work at the entrance to the Thameslink tunnel, London, 1993.

== Selected exhibitions ==
- Solo exhibitions: 1967: Galerie Givaudan, Paris, France, - 1982: Kunsthalle Baden-Baden, Germany, - 1995: Veranneman Foundation, Kruishoutem, Belgium, - 1998: New York Studio School Gallery, New York City, - 2001: Foundation Sculpture at Schoenthal, Langenbruck, Switzerland, - 2004: Kunsthalle Mannheim, Mannheim, Germany, - 2008: Park Ryu Sook Gallery, Seoul, South Korea, - 2008 Nigel Hall: Sculpture and Drawing 1965-2008 - Yorkshire Sculpture Park, Wakefield, West Yorkshire
- Group exhibitions: 1975: Biennale de Paris, Paris, France, - 1977: documenta 6, Kassel, Germany, - 2002/03: Peggy Guggenheim Collection, Venice, Italy, - 2001, 2003, 2005: "Blickachsen", Bad Homburg vor der Höhe, Germany, 2006: Museum of Fine Arts, Ostend, Belgium - 2015: British Art +, Museum Biedermann, Donaueschingen, Germany
- Public collections: Tate Gallery, London, - Musee National d'Art Moderne, Paris, France, - Neue Nationalgalerie, Berlin, Germany, - Tokyo Metropolitan Art Museum, Japan, - National Museum of Art, Osaka, Japan, - Museum of Contemporary Art, Sydney, Australia, - Dallas Museum of Fine Art, Texas, USA, - Tel Aviv Museum of Art, Israel

Hall's sculpture Soda Lake was featured in Richard Alston's dance as the physical set for the piece. The dance piece was named after the sculpture. The sculpture was inspired by Soda Lake which can be found in the Mojave Desert. One part of the sculpture is a thin metal pole which stretched up at an angle and has a large elliptical loop attached at its apex. The second part is a thicker pole which is hung diametrically opposite the point at which the loop is attached to the thin pole, and is suspended so that it does not quite reach the ground. This is in two parts, the top section being marginally fatter than the lower. The upper end of the pole is slightly pointed whilst its lower end is bluntly rounded. The sculpture is made of fiberglass and aluminium and is painted gloss black. Hall used the concept of silence found at the landscape of Soda Lake and translated it into his sculpture through hanging one of the poles above the ground slightly.

== Selected sculpture parks ==
- Yorkshire Sculpture Park, Wakefield, West Yorkshire
- Cass Sculpture at Goodwood
- Sculpture garden Kunsthalle Mannheim, Mannheim, Germany
- Foundation Sculpture at Schoenthal, Langenbruck, Switzerland

== Gallery ==
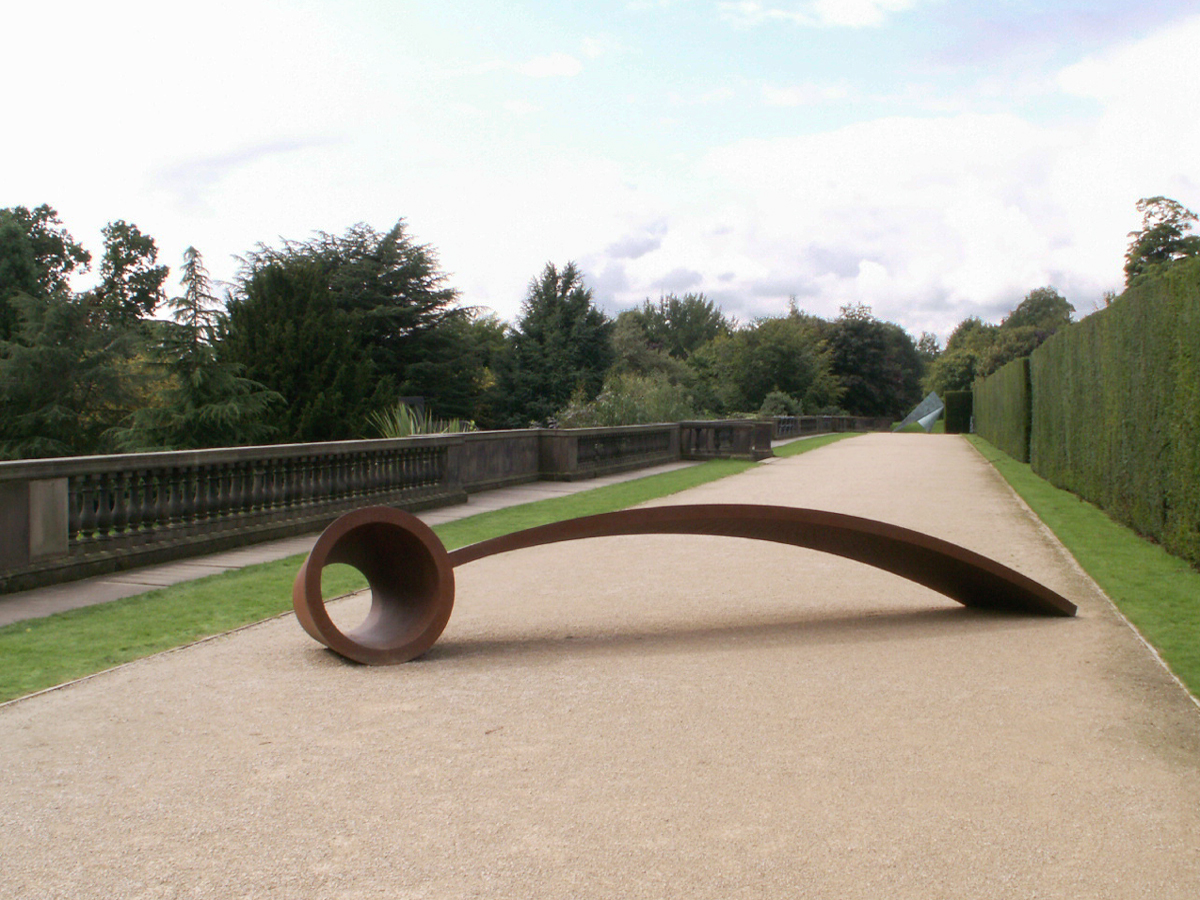
Wide Passage - Yorkshire Sculpture Park

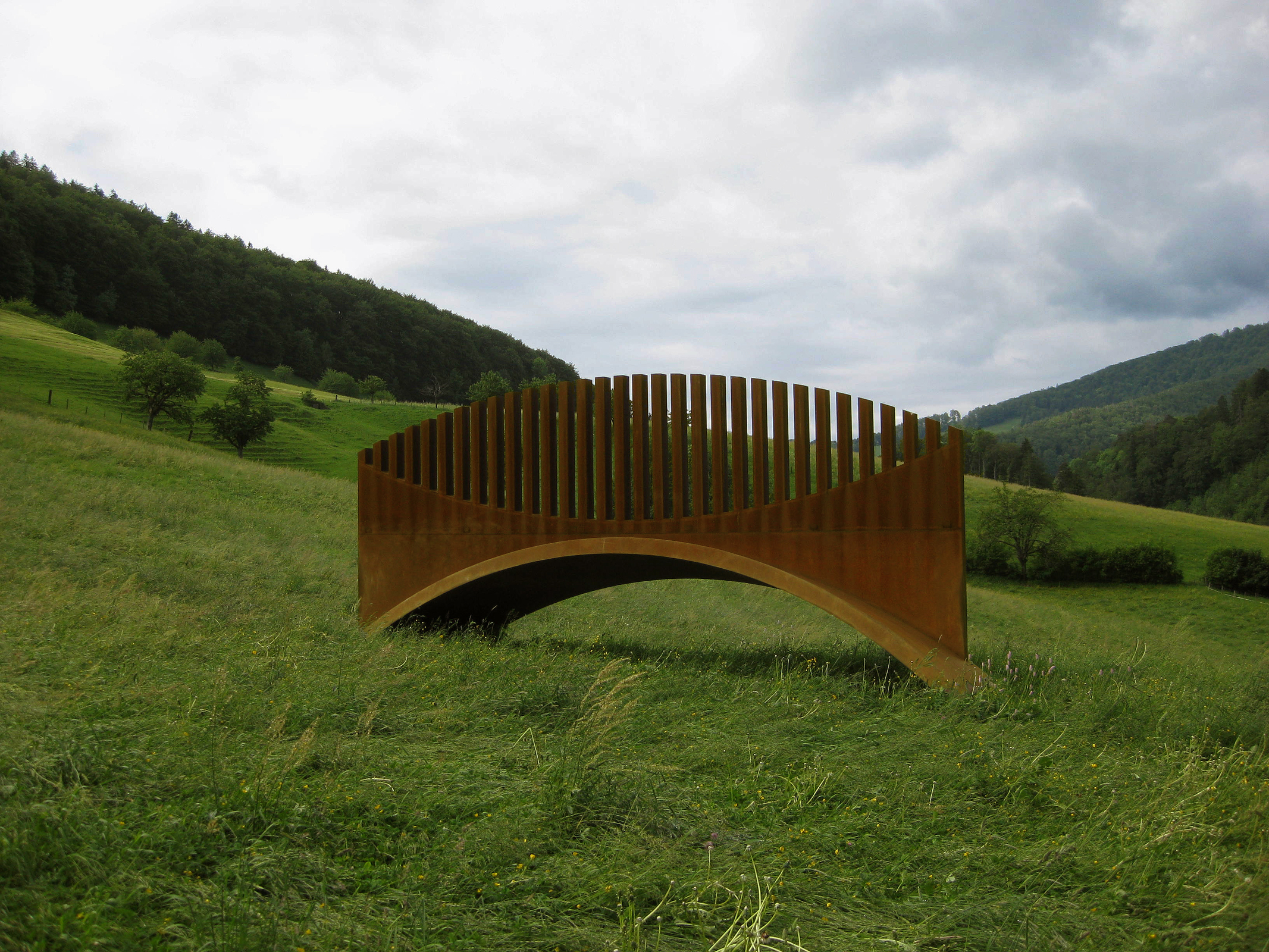
Spring - Sculpture at Schoenthal

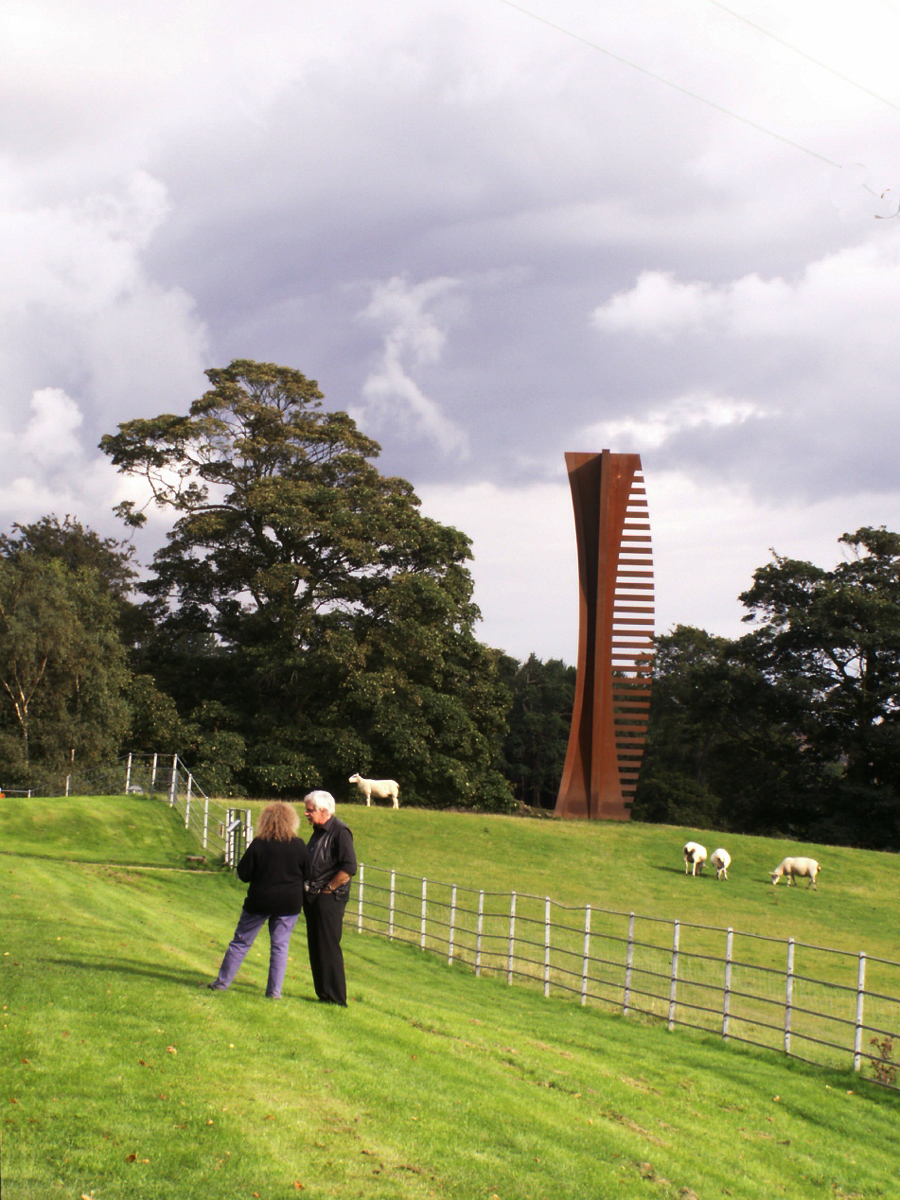
Crossing (Vertical) - Yorkshire Sculpture Park

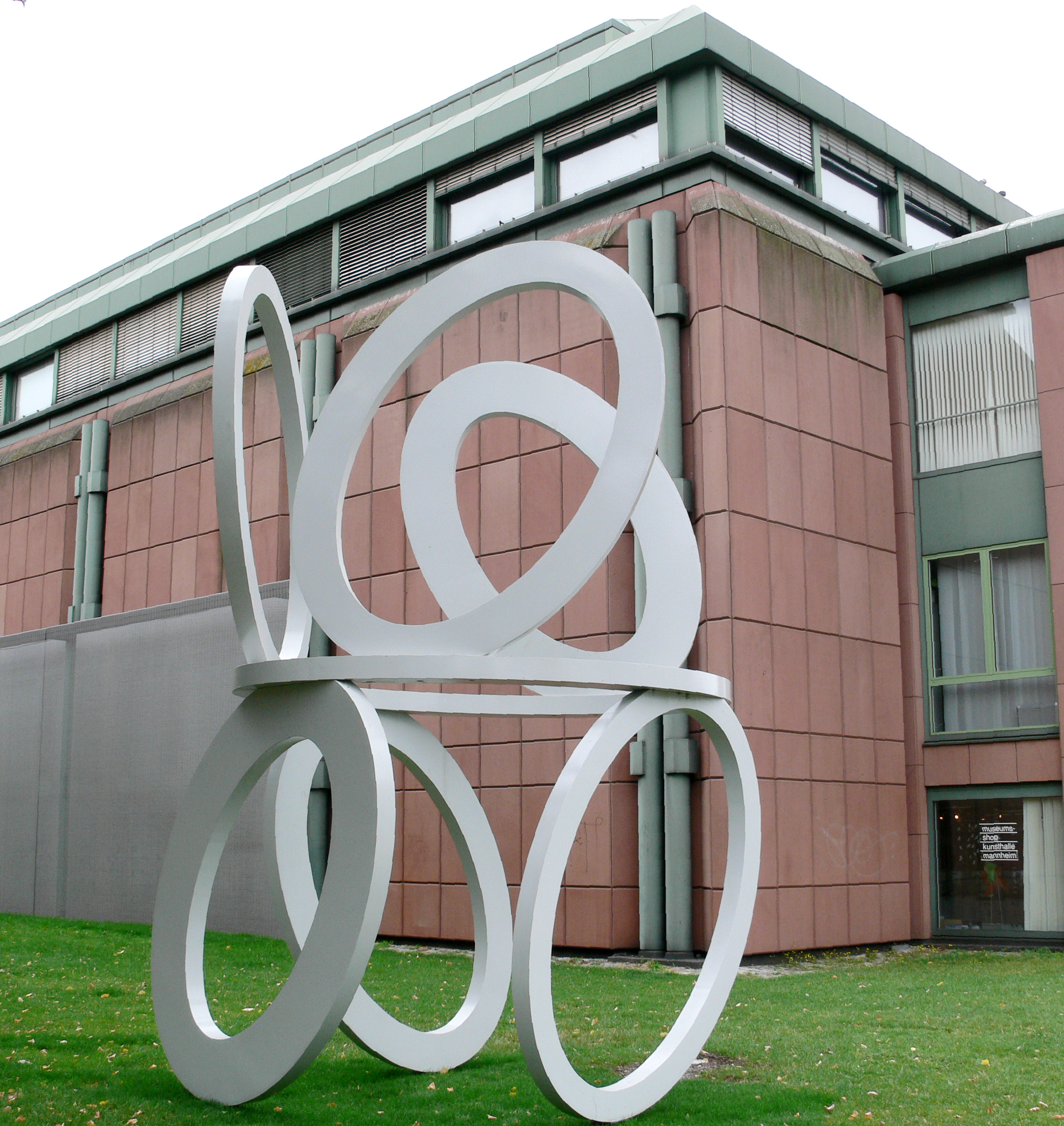
Slow Motion - Mannheim

== Selected literature ==
- Nigel Hall: Sculpture and Drawings, exh, cat., Annely Juda Fine Art, London, 1978
- Nigel Hall: Skulpturen und Zeichnungen, exh. cat., Kunsthalle Baden-Baden, Germany, 1982
- Nigel Hall: Hidden Valleys, exh. cat., Kunsthalle Mannheim, Germany, 2004
- Nigel Hall: Other Voices, Other Rooms, exh. Cat., Galerie Scheffel, Bad Homburg vor der Höhe, Germany, 2007
- Andrew Lambirth: Nigel Hall - Sculpture and Works on Paper. Royal Academy Books, London, 2008. ISBN 1-905711-30-1 - (The text is drawn from transcriptions of interviews with the artist recorded by Andrew Lambirth for the "Artist's Lives" project for the "National Life Stories". The British Library)
- Nigel Hall: Chinese Whispers, exh. cat., Galerie Andresthalmann, Zürich, 2010
