= John Loker =

British painter

John Loker (born 1938) is a contemporary British abstract painter based in East Anglia and represented by Flowers Gallery, London and New York. Loker has numerous artworks in public and private collections, and has exhibited in some of the UK's major institutions since the 1970s.

== Biography ==
John Loker was born in 1938 in Leeds. Loker studied graphic design at Bradford College of Art and Design between 1954 and 1958, where he befriended David Hockney, David Oxtoby, and Norman Stevens. The group of artists were known as the "Bradford Mafia" in the art world. In 1960 Loker moved to London to study painting at the Royal College of Art and graduated in 1963. The same year, Loker was awarded the Abbey Minor Travelling Scholarship.

Loker has exhibited in some of London’s major institutions, the Tate, Royal Academy of Arts, Barbican, as well as Cartwright Hall Gallery, Bradford, Walker Art Gallery (Liverpool), and in various galleries internationally. His works have been acquired by numerous institutions such as the Tate, Leeds Art Gallery and the Manchester Art Gallery.

Loker's first one-man exhibition "Horizontals and drawings" was held at Angela Flowers Gallery. London in October–November 1970. Flowers Gallery continues to regularly show Loker's work and plans to organise a solo exhibition in 2018 on the occasion of the artist's 80th birthday, in collaboration with Cartwright Hall Gallery, Bradford Museums.

John lives and works in East Anglia, UK, with partner and artist Emily Mayer.

== Work ==
Loker has developed a personal language of painterly abstraction over four decades. Since the 1980s, he has introduced recognisable elements to his paintings such as windshield wipers, pylons, and whales' tails. These recurring motifs are part of an evolving vocabulary, designed to describe the infinite and ephemeral nature of experience, and the shifting balance of opposing forces. His sources of inspiration are varied and have included a 10-week long trip in Australia, the concept of rolling closure (when roads are closed on the occasion of a cycling race), NASA imagery, and metaphysical reflections on space and time.

== Collections ==
Loker is represented in the following collections:

- Arts Council of Great Britain
- British Council
- Contemporary Art Society
- De Beers Department of the Environment
- Deutsche Bank AG, London
- Dudley City Art Gallery
- Ferens Art Gallery, Hull
- Hunterian Collection, Glasgow
- IBM
- Leeds City Art Gallery
- Lloyds TSB Group PLC, London
- Manchester City Art Gallery
- Power Institute of Fine Art, Sydney
- Rugby City Art Gallery
- Tate Gallery
- Unilever
- Van Reekumgaler, Apeldoorn
- Victoria and Albert Museum
- Wakefield City Art Gallery
- Worcester City Art Gallery

== Commissions and awards ==
- 1994 Winner of the Nordstern Award for best print at the Royal Academy Summer Exhibition
- 1992 ITN building (Norman Foster), London. (Painting commissioned by Stanhope Developments)
- 1984 Essex General Hospital
- 1983 Watmoughs Holdings, Bradford
