= Janelle Lynch =

American photographer (born 1969)

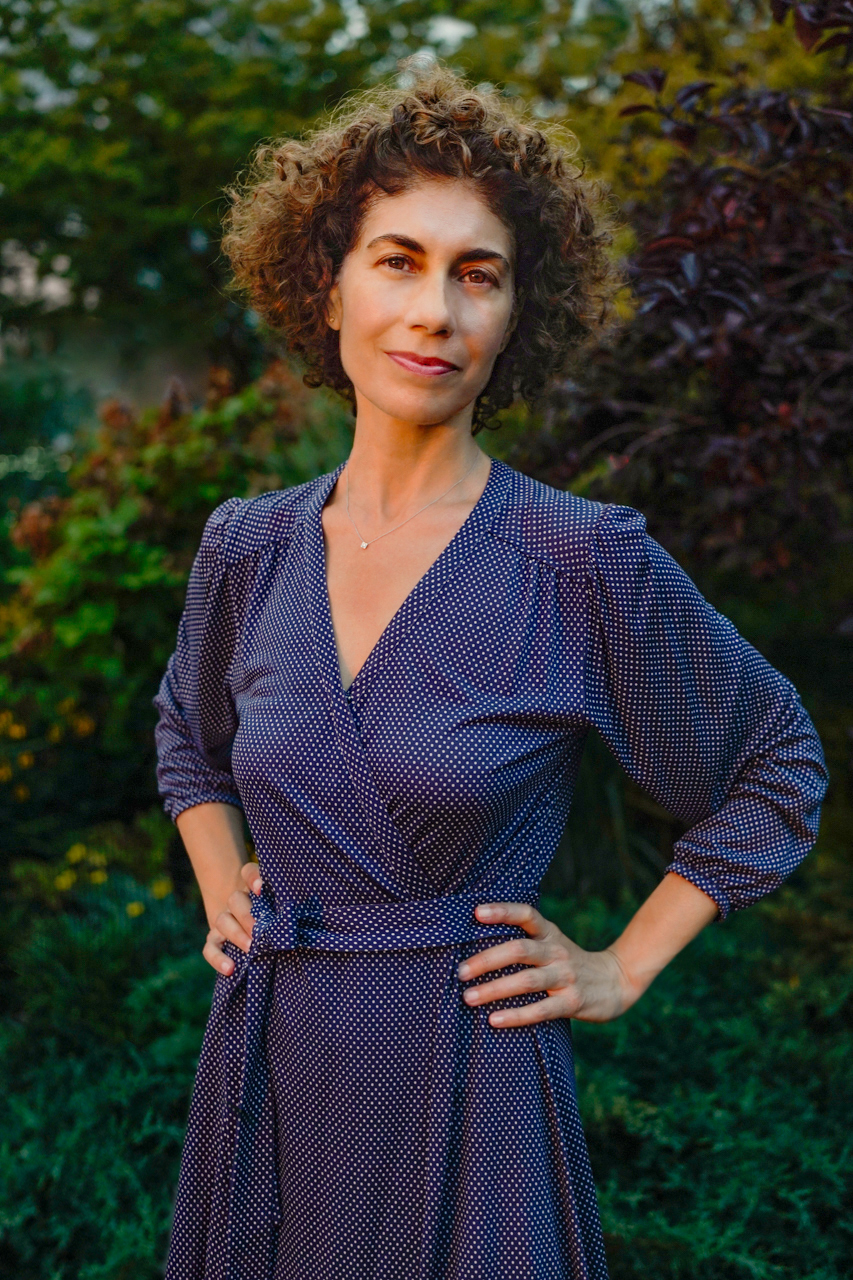
- Born: 1969 (age 56–57)
- Education: School of Visual Arts
- Known for: Photography

Janelle Lynch (born 1969) is an American artist who uses a large-format camera and alternative processes in the discovery of ecological, spiritual, and human connection. Combining portraits and nature imagery, Lynch’s work explores and imagines a world that centers beauty, connection, and empathy as foundational values and healing forces.

== Photographic series ==
=== River ===
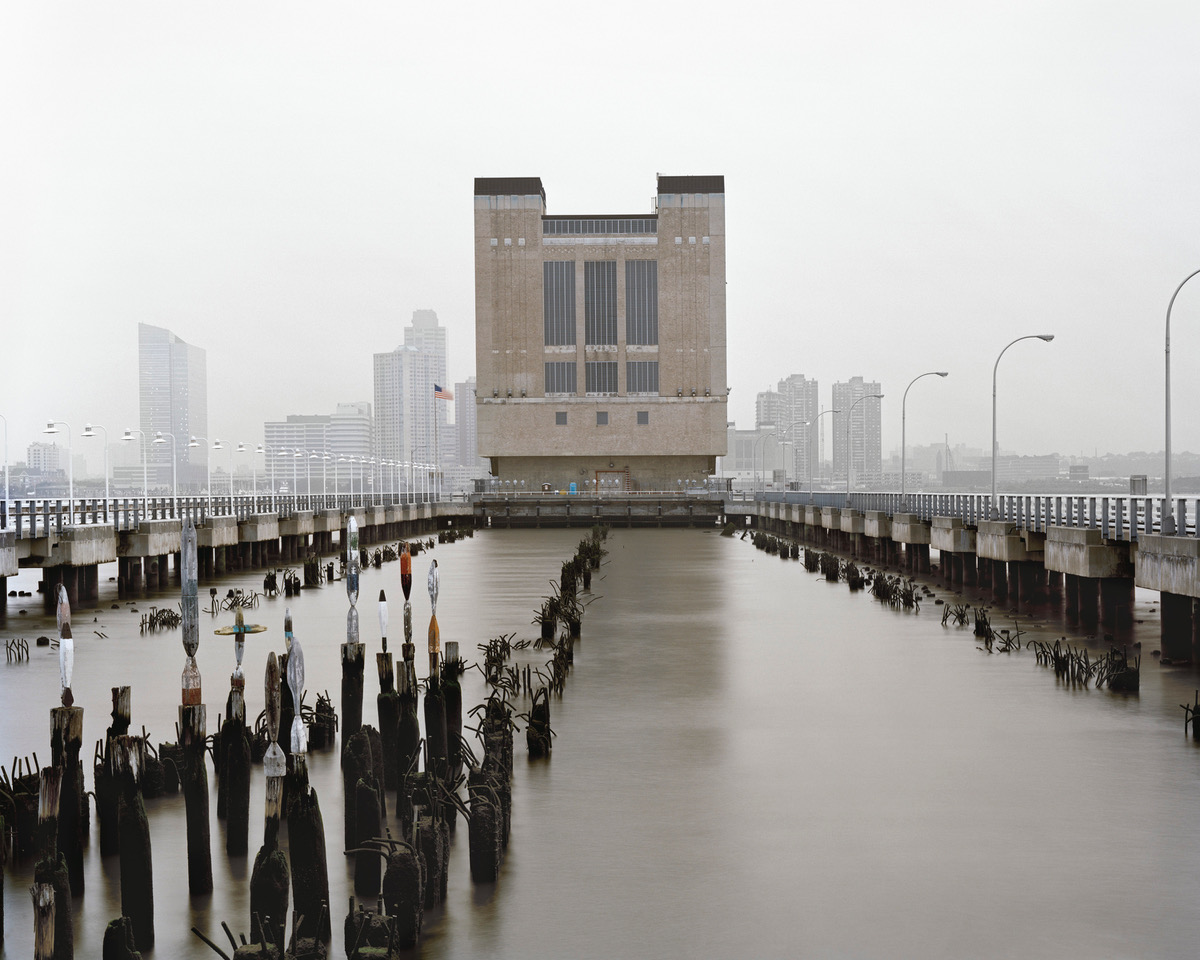
From "River" (2001–2006)

In 2001, she began her River series. It consists of 10 photographs that she made along the Hudson River in Manhattan, and explores impermanence and cultural change through historical urban architecture.

=== Los Jardines de México ===
Los Jardines de México begins with El Jardín de Juegos (Mexico City, 2002-2003). The images, void of people show the relics of a children's playground conquered by nature and neglect.

The Donde Andaba series (Mexico City, 2005) juxtaposes wild plant life with architecture and explores the subject of the persistence of life despite its ambient conditions.

The photographs in the series, Akna (Chiapas, 2006), are portraits of anthropomorphized tree stumps in a nature reserve, which investigate the theme of regeneration. This is Lynch’s first series with an 8x10-inch view camera.

La Fosa Común (Mexico City, 2007) was made in the functioning, century-old common grave, centrally located within the city. The photographs of vegetation in various stages of the life cycle, coupled with subtle suggestions of the setting, further the exploration of notions of loss and death that El Jardín de Juegos began in 2002–2003, while simultaneously celebrating life and its intricate beauty.

Radius Books published Los Jardines de México in 2011.

=== Barcelona ===
From 2007 to 2011, while living in Spain, Lynch explored the fallow landscape outside of Barcelona along its waterways to explore presence, memory and loss. Barcelona continues Lynch's long-term interest in representations of the life cycle in the landscape.

In 2013, Radius Books published the work in her second monograph, Barcelona, with her nonfiction writings, including The Window. The book begins with a personal essay about Lynch's early relationship with nature and includes text about and quotes from Charles Burchfield, Wendell Berry and Roland Barthes, whose works have been influential in Lynch's process.

In 2015, Barcelona was nominated for the Prix Pictet.

=== Presence ===
In 2013, Lynch was the first artist-in-residence at the Burchfield Penney Art Center in Buffalo, NY. By then, the painter Burchfield had been an important influence for many years. The resulting year-long project, Presence, uses naturally occurring connections in the landscape to affirm kinships with creative influences and progenitors of the environmental movement. In 2014, Nancy Weekly, Burchfield Scholar, curated an exhibition of it in the Burchfield Rotunda.

=== Another Way of Looking at Love ===
In 2018, Radius Books published her third monograph, Another Way of Looking at Love.

This three-year project, borne of awe for the power of nature, seeks to inspire connection: to one another, to the planet, and to the generative possibilities of the present moment. It is influenced by Mary Oliver's poetry, Rebecca Solnit's writings about "slow seeing," Jon Kabat-Zinn's research on mindfulness and neuroscience, as well as Amy Banks' research on Relational Cultural Theory, which emphasizes the importance of loving human connections and their impact on our lives, culture, and planet.

In 2019, Another Way of Looking at Love was shortlisted for the Prix Pictet, the award for photography and sustainability. The theme was "hope." In February 2020, NPR's The Picture Show featured Another Way of Looking at Love in "A Photographer's Guide To 'Slow Seeing' The Beauty In Everyday Nature."

=== Fern Valley ===
Fern Valley (2020-2021) is a body of work that Lynch made in the North Georgia Mountains during the pandemic. Her first series to combine landscapes, portraits and still lifes, it embodies promise, celebrates resilience, and affirms love during a time of global despair.

=== Endless Forms Most Beautiful ===
In Endless Forms Most Beautiful (2022-2023), Lynch began to further explore her deep kinship with nature through the cyanotype medium creating physical recordings of natural elements––an osprey wing, sea plants, and her own body––that affirm the fundamental value of all life in its various manifestations. They are evidence of physical existence and, as abstractions in hues of blue and white, also suggest the ethereal world. Endless Forms Most Beautiful borrows its title from the last lines of Darwin’s On the Origin of Species. While his theories are rooted in the material world of atoms and molecules, the words also describe what may exist beyond it.

Filmmaker Mia Allen produced a short documentary film following Lynch during the evolution of this series.

=== Family ===
Family (2016-present) is an ongoing series of environmental portraits that explore the reciprocal experience of beholding. Lynch photographs people that she cares about, and is interested in how the photographic event creates a connection that is unique to the encounter and in how it has the potential to alter perceptions and the relationship.

== Publications ==
- Los Jardines de México. Radius, 2011. With a work of short fiction by Mario Bellatín and essay by José Antonio Aldrete-Hass.
- Barcelona. Radius, 2013 also with Lynch's nonfiction writings, including The Window, and five related series. Also with text about and quotes from Charles Burchfield, Wendell Berry and Roland Barthes.
- Another Way of Looking at Love. Radius, 2018. With an essay by Darius Himes.

== Collections ==
Lynch's work is held in the following public collections:

- Metropolitan Museum of Art, New York, NY
- Victoria and Albert Museum, London UK: including six images from Another Way of Looking at Love
- Southeast Museum of Photography, Daytona Beach, FL
- Hudson River Museum, Yonkers, NY
- New York Public Library, New York, NY
- York Historical Society, New York, NY
- Brooklyn Museum, Brooklyn, NY
- Newark Museum, Newark, NJ
- George Eastman Museum, Rochester, NY
- Burchfield Penney Art Center, Buffalo, NY: Presence
- Fundacio Vila Casa, Barcelona, Spain
- Centro de Fotografía, Tenerife, Spain
- Fundación AMYC, Madrid, Spain
- Villa Noailles, Hyères, France
- Museum of Contemporary Photography, Chicago, IL
- Stanford University, Stanford, CA

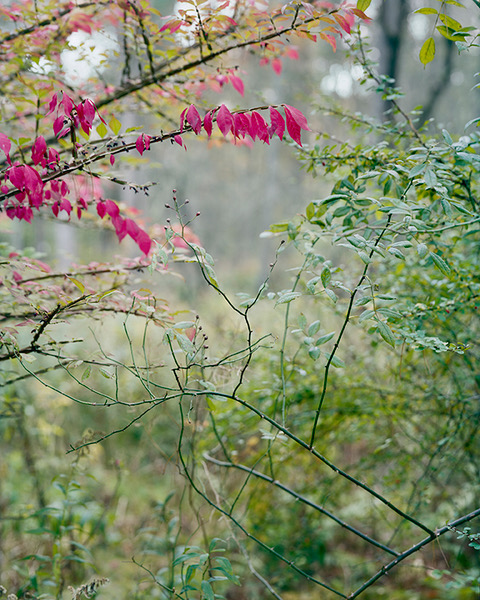
From "Another Way of Looking at Love" (2015–2018)

== Exhibitions ==
=== Solo exhibitions ===
- Frampton Co. and Flowers Gallery, Bridgehampton, NY, 2024
- Flowers Gallery, London, United Kingdom, 2023
- Lesley University, Cambridge, MA, 2023
- Memphis Botanical Garden, Memphis, TN
- Delaware Valley Arts Alliance, Narrowsburg, NY, 2020
- Janelle Lynch: Another Way of Looking at Love, Hudson River Museum, Yonkers, NY, September 2019 – February 2020
- Burchfield Penney Art Center, Buffalo, NY, 2014
- Robert Morat Galerie, Berlin, 2013
- Museo Archvio de la Fotografía, Mexico City, Mexico, 2011
- Photofusion, London, 2008

=== Group exhibitions ===
- Centro Cultural Yves Alves, Tiradentes, Minas Gerais, Brazil, 2024
- Foley Gallery, New York, NY, 2023
- Hope, Prix Pictet touring exhibition, Palazzo della Gran Guardia, Verona, Italy, 2021; Eretz Israel Museo, Tel Aviv, Israel, 2021; Grimaldi Forum, Monaco, 2021; Shanghai Centre of Photography, Shanghai, China, 2021; Gallery of Photography, Dublin, 2021; Mouravieff-Apostol House & Museum, Moscow, 2020; ArtLab, EPFL, Lausanne, Switzerland, 2020; Hillside Forum, Tokyo, 2019
- Museum of the City of New York, New York City, 2020–2022)
- Prix Pictet shortlisted artists' work, Victoria and Albert Museum, London, November 2019; then toured to venues in Japan, Switzerland, and Russia, among others
- Vital Signs: Place Biennial Exhibition included Lynch's River series, George Eastman Museum, 2006

== Awards and honors ==
- 2019: Prix Pictet, Shortlist
- 2017–2019: The Hermitage Artist Retreat, Artist-in-Residence
- 2013: Burchfield Penney Art Center, Artist-in-Residence
- 2013: AIGA: The American Institute of Graphic Arts named Barcelona a recipient of their 50 Books/ 50 Covers Award, Award
- 2013: The Cord Prize, Finalist for Walls
- 2009: Santa Fe Prize for Photography, Finalist for Los Jardines de México
- 2007: Festival International de Mode et de Photographie à Hyères, Finalist
- 2007: PHotoEspaña Descubrimientos, Finalist
