= Nicola Hicks =

English sculptor (born 1960)

Nicola Hicks MBE (born 1960 in London) is an English sculptor, known for her works made using straw and plaster.

== Biography ==
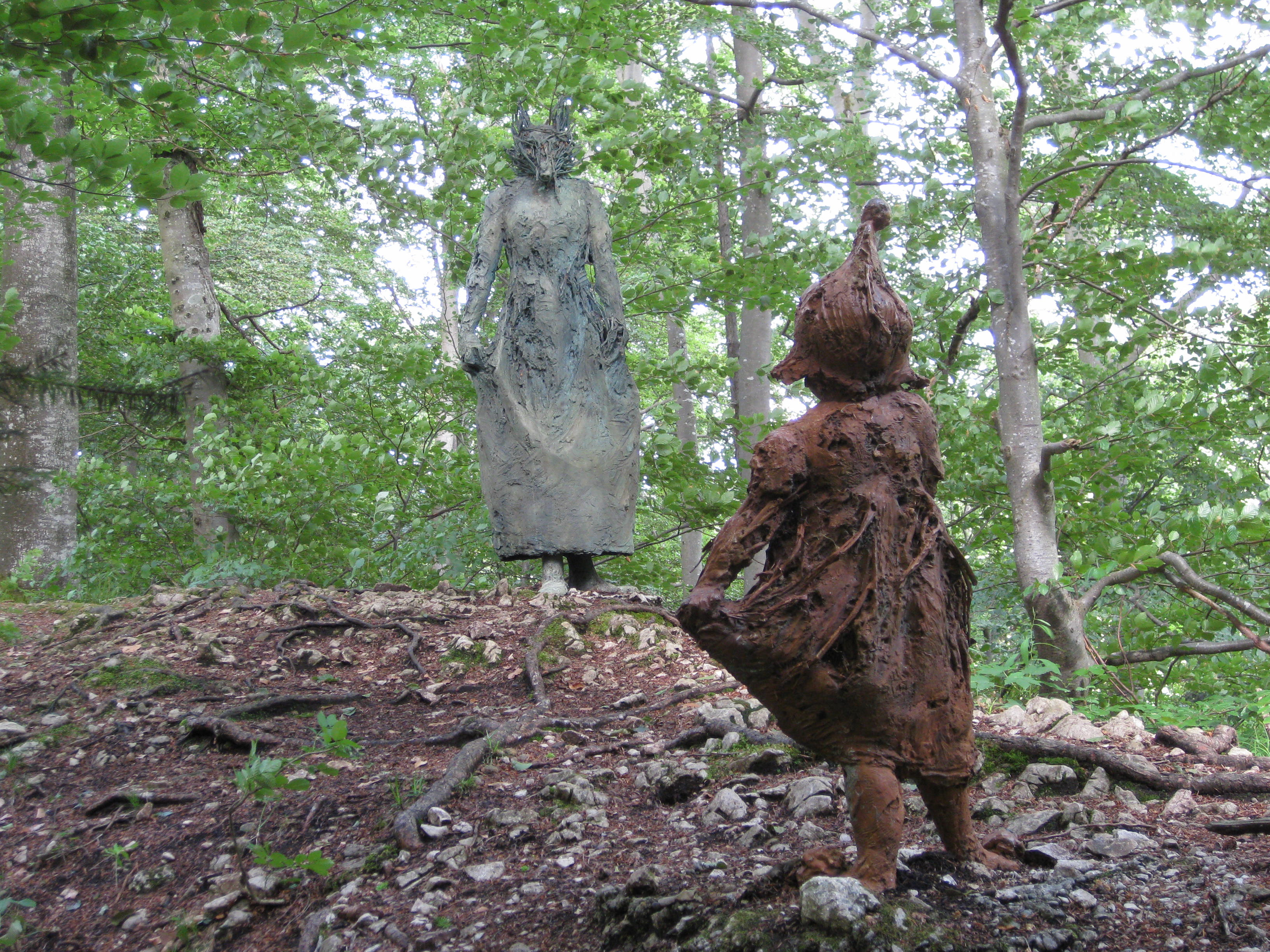
Recovered Memory, Sculpture at Schoenthal, 1996–97

Hicks studied at the Chelsea School of Art from 1978 to 1982 and at the Royal College of Art from 1982 to 1985.

Animals are Hicks' primary subject matter, usually sculpted in straw and plaster. This was unusual for an artist in the 1980s, by which time abstract sculpture and installation art had become the norm in the art world. Hicks also works on huge sheets of brown paper on which she works up her dynamic charcoal drawings. Many of the sculptures have subsequently been cast in bronze, often with such subtlety that every detail of plaster and straw is reproduced.

Hicks was recognised by Elisabeth Frink, who selected her for a solo exhibition at Angela Flowers's gallery in 1985.

To accompany an exhibition at Flowers Gallery in 1993, Robert Heller said:

"The only thing precocious about that one-day show was the artist's age: she was only 24. But the work had a maturity of concept and sureness of execution that defied precocity. The life-sized dying bull of straw and hessian, in particular, was a terrifying work, whose physical frailty contrasted with its colossal psychic presence. The Gallery quickly invited Hicks to join its permanent family of artists, and her first one-person show followed in 1985. Such discovery of new talent for the Gallery was a welcome by product of the annual Artist of the Day fortnight. Hicks was by no means unrecognised, though. She was still a student at the Royal College of Art (having got her degree at Chelsea), but had already featured in mixed exhibitions at locales ranging from Christies to Liverpool via Ruskin College. In 1985, however, her career blossomed. In addition to the Flowers show, her work was exhibited in Kettle’s Yard, the Hayward Annual, New York, Serpentine, etc."

Hicks has achieved success as an artist, creating public sculptures such as Beetle in Bristol and the second iteration of the Brown Dog Memorial in Battersea Park. She has had major solo shows in leading museums and galleries in Britain and around the world, and was made an MBE in the 1995 New Year Honours for her contribution to the visual arts. In 2010 Hicks exhibited Black, 2008 in 'Exhibitionism' at the East Wing, Courtauld Institute of Art at Somerset House.

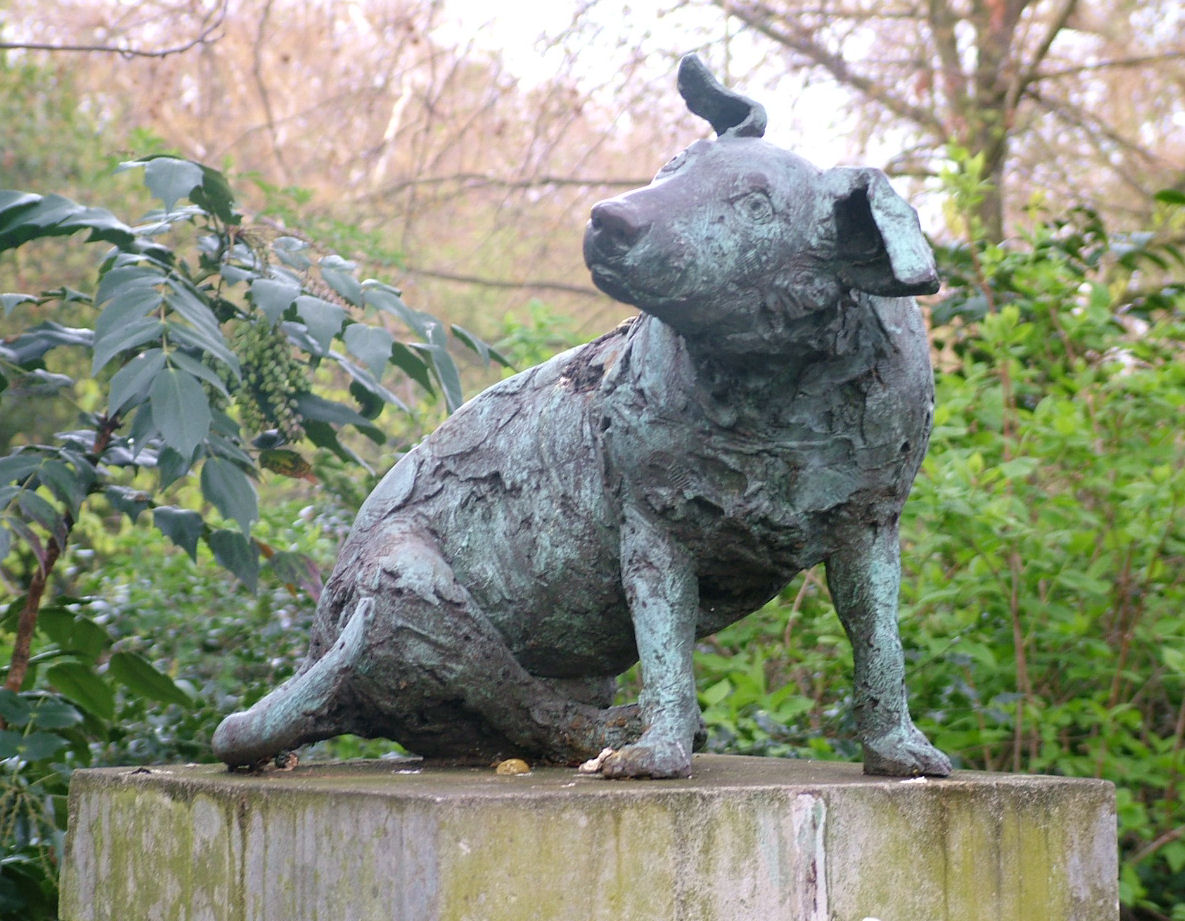
"Brown Dog", Battersea Park, 1985

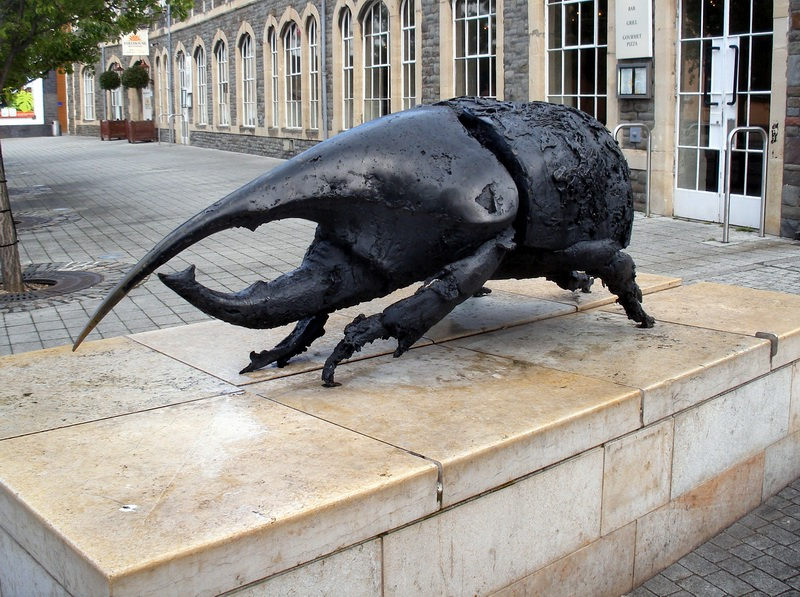
'"Beetle", Bristol, 2000

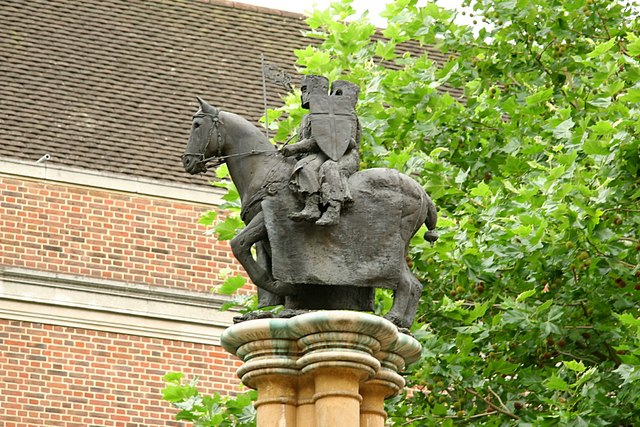
"Statue on Knights Templar Column", London, 2000

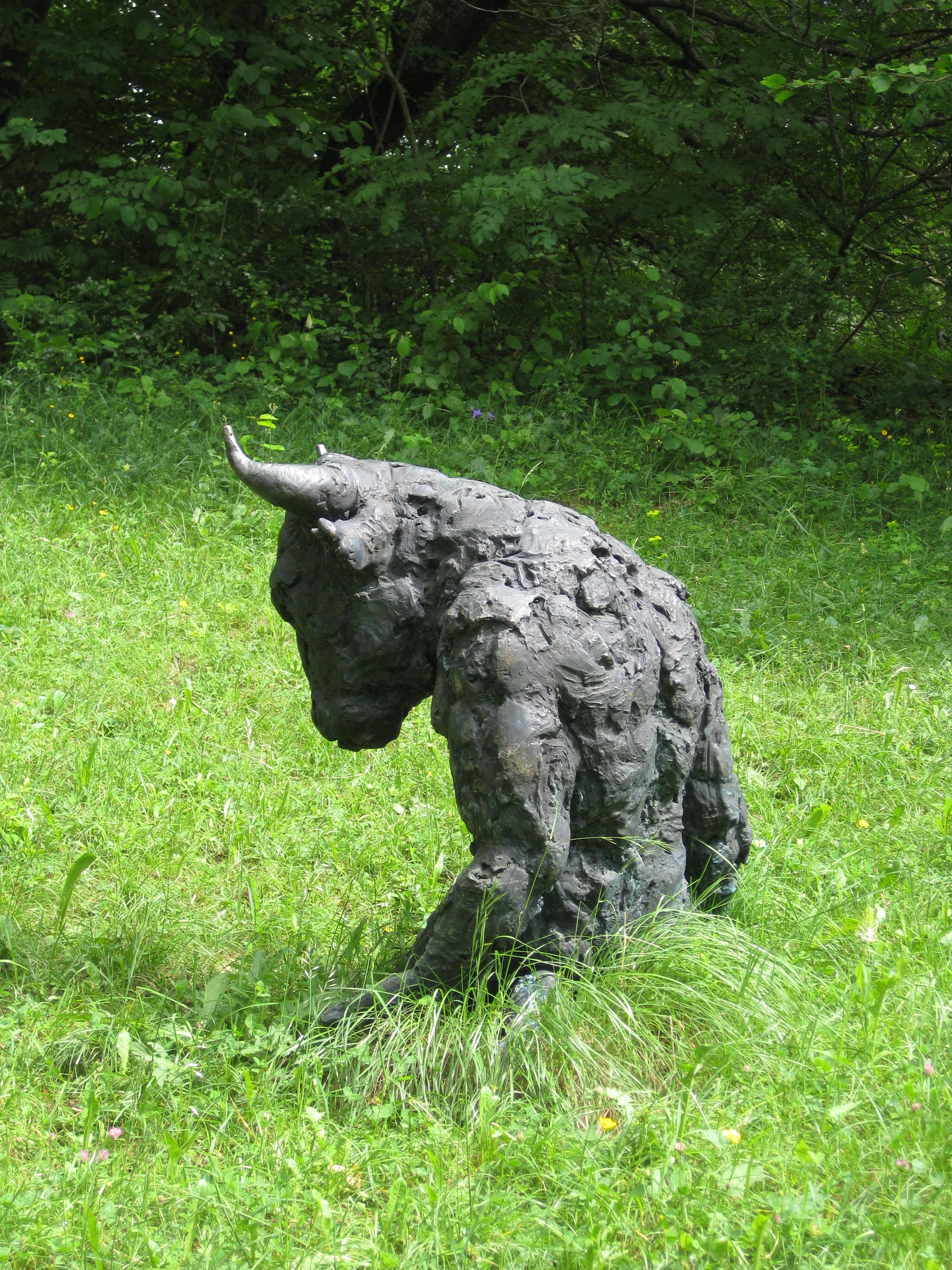
"Crouching Minotaur", Sculpture at Schoenthal, 2003

== Key exhibitions ==
Flowers Gallery East

Wabbling Back to the Fire, Flowers East, London, 19 September - 11 November 2017, Solo exhibition.

Yale Center for British Art

Sculpture by Nicola Hicks - Yale Center for British Art, 14 November 2013 – 9 March 2014
In this exhibition, Hicks's life-size sculptures are placed in the galleries amid objects of the center's permanent collection, home to one of the world's most important collections of British art outside the UK.

The Universal Addressability of Dumb Things

Mark Leckey: Hayward Gallery Touring Exhibition.

- The Bluecoat, Liverpool, 16 February – 14 April 2013
- Nottingham Contemporary, 27 April – 30 June 2013
- De La Warr Pavilion, Bexhill on Sea, 13 July – 20 October 2013
- Venice Biennale (virtual exhibition), 1 June – 24 November 2013

This exhibition, curated by Turner prize-winning artist Mark Leckey, explores how our relationships with artworks and common objects alike are being transformed through new information technologies.

== Personal life ==
Hicks married Daniel Flowers, youngest son of Angela Flowers.

== Bibliography ==
Exhibition Catalogues

- Nicola Hicks: Sculpture & Drawings, [Catalogue of the exhibition held at Flowers East, 1995] London.
- Fire & Brimstone, [Catalogue of the exhibition held at Flowers East, 1991] London
- A walk in the Park, [Catalogue of the exhibition held at Flowers East, 2010] London
- Sculpture, Drawing, Prints, Flowers, [Catalogue of the exhibition held at Flowers East, 2007] London
- Nicola Hicks; Sculpture, Drawing & Light, [Catalogue of the exhibition held at Abbot Hall Art Gallery, 2005] Cumbria
- Nicola Hicks; Keep Dark, Published by Flowers Gallery and Elephant to coincide with the Wabbling Back to the Fire exhibition held at Flowers East, 2017 London

Monographs

- Dellingpole, J., Denselow, A., Elliot, A. Read, B. and Self, W. (1999) Nicola Hicks, Momentum Publishing
- Lynton, N. (2004) Sculpture, Flowers, London,
- Self, W. (1998) The Camel That Broke the Straw's Back, Flowers East, London .
