= Forgive and Forget =

Forgive and Forget may refer to:

== Film and television ==
- Forgive and Forget (1923 film), an American silent mystery film
- Forgive and Forget (2000 film), a Scottish television film
- "Forgive and Forget" (ER), an episode of the American medical drama TV series ER

== Music ==
- "Forgive and Forget", a song by Alien Ant Farm from the 2006 album Up in the Attic
- "Forgive and Forget", a song by A Day to Remember from the 2016 album Bad Vibrations
- "Forgive and Forget", a song by Miss May I from the 2009 album Apologies Are for the Weak
- "Forgive and Forget", a song by You Me at Six from the 2014 album Cavalier Youth
- "(I Just Can't) Forgive and Forget", a song by Blue Zoo from the 1983 album Two by Two

== Other uses ==
- Forgive and Forget: Healing the Hurts We Don't Deserve, a book by Lewis B. Smedes
