= Jane Joseph (artist) =

English artist (1942–2025)

- Born: 1942; Surrey, England
- Died: 16 February 2025 (aged 82); London, England
- Education: Camberwell School of Art (1961–65), Robert Medley
- Known for: Painting; drawing; printmaking
- Awards: Leverhulme Travelling Award (1965–66); Abbey Award in Painting (1991, 1995)
- Website: janejoseph.co.uk

Jane Joseph (1942 – 16 February 2025) was an English artist who worked in painting, printmaking, and drawing. Two series of her etchings are held in the permanent collection at the British Museum.

== Life and work ==
She collaborated with various writers, including Mel Gooding, Michael Heller, and Anthony Rudolf, to produce artist's books and print folios. In 1999 and 2001, she was commissioned by the Folio Society to create illustrations for reprints of Primo Levi’s significant works, If This Is a Man and The Truce.

In addition to her artistic practice, Joseph served as an educator, teaching at Wimbledon School of Art and Morley College, where she contributed to the development of future artists for over forty years.

"The places I choose to portray are ordinary: my studio, the surrounding London landscape, places outside the city which have become familiar to me. They are urban sites abundant with nature or they are rural or coastal, dominated by architecture: fixed spaces which are activated by the movement of people or traffic, the flow of water, a change in the weather, sometimes a piece of land seen from a moving ship. They are projected into focus by a particular light, a moment of flux I try to seize.

I have found in etching a medium whose infinite range of marks allows me to exploit on a small scale the dynamic power of black and white. I can resolve, as finished works, ideas which would otherwise remain in sketchbooks."

— Jane Joseph, 2004

Joseph died in London on 16 February 2025, at the age of 82.

== Exhibitions ==
Joseph held over 20 solo exhibitions at venues, including:

- Morley Gallery, London (1973, 1995, 1997, 2023)
- Flowers East, London (1982, 1992, 1994)
- Hebrew Union College – Jewish Institute of Religion, New York (1999)
- Stanley Picker Gallery, Kingston University (1999)
- Worcester City Art Gallery (2001)
- Victoria Art Gallery, Bath (2004)
- London Jewish Cultural Centre (2014)
- Southampton City Art Gallery (2016)
- School of Art Gallery, Aberystwyth University (2004, 2018)

== Collections ==
Joseph's work is held in the following permanent collections:

United Kingdom
- Aberystwyth University
- Ashmolean Museum
- Ben Uri Gallery & Museum
- British Library
- British Museum
- Fitzwilliam Museum
- Government Art Collection
- Morley College
- Victoria and Albert Museum
- The Whitworth
- The Women's Art Collection

United States

- Hebrew Union College
- Yale Center for British Art

Portugal

- Douro Museum
