= Bermondsey Project Space =

Art gallery in Bermondsey, London

Coordinates: 51°29′55.47″N 0°4′51.5″W

Bermondsey Project Space is a not-for-profit art gallery in Bermondsey, South East London. It was founded in 2015 as Art Bermondsey Project Space and sponsored by Olympus in association with State/F22 magazine. Located in a 3,000 sq ft converted Georgian townhouse adjacent to the White Cube Bermondsey, the gallery hosts three exhibition rooms over three floors of this former paperworks. The gallery presents a programme of exhibitions, events and out-reach educational projects, producing a publication to accompany each show in support of the gallery programme. The Gallery Director is Andrew Etherington. The Artistic Director is Mike von Joel.

== History ==
Bermondsey Project Space was founded in London as a not-for-profit gallery in October 2015 to encourage personal development through visual art and support the fusion of art, photography and culture. The Olympus seed funding was spearheaded by Mark Thackara (Europe) and David Ivens (UK) from an original proposal from State/F22 magazine. The Bermondsey Project Space also had Olympus' partners in Amsterdam, Berlin and Hamburg. Initially for one year, the Olympus/State partnership lasted for three years due to the success of the project. From March 2018 onward the gallery has worked independently with numerous small partnerships and sponsors to realise the exhibition programme - guided by the Artistic Director and full time Director. The gallery is run to a Foundation Charity criteria and has a board of 12 governors. It still receives minor financial support from State Media (State/F22 magazine).

In 2018, the gallery was shortlisted for two of Southwark Council's "Southwark Business Excellence Awards".

== Exhibitions ==
- The Future Can Wait, a satellite exhibition of London's New Wave artists. 2015.
- Dench Does Dallas, photographs by Peter Dench. 2015.
- Calculations, Permutations, Notations by the Belgian collective LAb(au) in collaboration with The Mayor Gallery. 2016.
- Exhibition in a Box, party photographs from the 1980s and 1990s by society photographer Dafydd Jones. 2016.
- Rewind, recent paintings and works on paper by Julie Umerle. 2016.
- The Kate Inside: Kate Bush, photographs from 1982 to 1993 by Guido Harari. 2016.
- Marilyn Stafford | Stories in Pictures 1950-60, June–July 2017. Photographs by Marilyn Stafford.
- The Discontents, Group show by five artworld protagonists: Matthew Collings, Tommaso Corvi-Mora, Zavier Ellis, Matthew Higgs and Max Presneill. 2018.
- Dancing on My Own: Selected Works 1999 - 2019 by Stuart Semple. 2019.
