= Blue Zoo =

English new wave band

- Origin: England
- Genres: New wave, synthpop
- Years active: 1980–1985, 2010–present
- Label: Magnet Records
- Members: Andy O Mike Ansell; Mickey Sparrow; Tom Morrison
- Past members: Tim Parry; Matthew Flowers; Pete Lancaster; Steve Pond

Blue Zoo are an English new wave band, active between 1980 and 1985, and again since 2010.

== Career ==
Formed in 1980, their original band name was Modern Jazz, and they released two singles titled "In My Sleep (I Shoot Sheep)" and "Ivory Towers" in 1981.

The nucleus of the band were Andy O (Overall) on vocals, Tim Parry on guitar, David Woolfson (keyboards/saxophone), Mike Ansell on bass and Mickey Sparrow on drums. Matthew Flowers (formerly of new wave band Sore Throat) accompanied the band live on keyboards, with Pete Lancaster occasionally on trumpet and Steve Pond from Inner City Unit playing occasional synthesizer. Tim Parry later went on to become a record producer and work in artist management.

Blue Zoo had three hit singles which charted in the UK. "I'm Your Man" reached No. 55 in June 1982 and in October 1982, "Cry Boy Cry" reached the top 20, peaking at No. 13, becoming the band's biggest hit. It stayed on the UK Singles Chart's top 40 for eight weeks. "(I Just Can't) Forgive and Forget" reached No. 60 in May 1983.

Although failing to chart, "Love Moves in Strange Ways" was a single of the week in NME.

They released an album, Two by Two (sometimes written as 2x2 or 2By2) in 1983. Cherry Red Records reissued an expanded edition of Two by Two with bonus tracks on 4 November 2013.

Blue Zoo played their first concert in 28 years at the Ginglik in Shepherd's Bush Green on 22 July 2010. In February 2013, the band successfully completed a short tour of the Philippines.

== Members ==
Lewis Boakes (tambourine)

=== Current lineup ===
- Andy O (vocals)
- Mike Ansell (bass)
- Mickey Sparrow (drums)
- Tom E Morrison (guitar)

The band also performs with guest keyboard players.

== Discography ==
=== Albums ===
Title	Album details
Two by Two	Released: 25 November 1983; Label: Magnet; Formats: LP, MC
Somewhere in the World	Released: 1984; Label: Magnet; Formats: LP, MC; Released in Yugoslavia as For All I Really Care
In Love & in Life	Released: 2013; Label: N/A; Formats: CD; Promotional compilation

=== Singles ===
Title	Year	Peak chart positions	
Title	Year	UK	IRE
"Love Moves in Strange Ways"	1981	—	—
"I'm Your Man"	1982	55	—
"Cry Boy Cry"	1982	13	25
"Loved One's an Angel"	1983	76	—
"(I Just Can't) Forgive and Forget"	1983	60	—
"Somewhere in the World There's a Cowboy Smiling"	1983	119	—
"Funganista"	2016	—	—
"—" denotes releases that did not chart.
