= Kelly Richardson =

Canadian artist

Exiles of the Shattered Star, 2006

Kelly Richardson (born 1972) is a Canadian artist working with digital technologies to create hyper-real landscapes. She is currently a professor at the Department of Visual Arts of the University of Victoria.

== Early life and education ==
Richardson was born August 2, 1972, in Burlington, Ontario, Canada. From 1994 to 1997, she studied at the Ontario College of Art & Design in Toronto, Ontario. In 2002, she relocated to Halifax, Nova Scotia for her Master of Fine Arts in Media Studies at the Nova Scotia College of Art and Design University. In 2003, she moved to the United Kingdom taking up residence in the northeast where she also completed her master's degree at Newcastle University with distinction.

== Career ==
Richardson works with video and digital photography to create hyper-real landscapes. Her work "adopts the use of cinematic language to investigate notions of constructed environments and the blurring of the real versus the unreal. She creates contemplative spaces which offer visual metaphors for the sensations associated with the hugely complicated world we have created for ourselves, magnificent and equally dreadful." As David Jager noted in Canadian Art,

Richardson deploys a formidable range of techniques and a broad palette of approaches in her creation of a new aesthetic, one that elicits a euphoric suspension of disbelief, allowing viewers to delve into the increasingly ambiguous and complex juncture between the real and the represented. She has transformed video, once a self-consciously minimal, anti-cinematic, bare-bones practice, into something much richer, and much stranger.

In 2012, a 15-year retrospective exhibition of her work entitled Legion was organised by and premiered at the Northern Gallery for Contemporary Art in England. The retrospective then toured to the Grundy Art Gallery (UK), Towner (UK), and Albright-Knox Art Gallery (USA).

In 2017, she joined the Department of Visual Arts of the University of Victoria as a professor. Prior to this, she had worked as a lecturer in fine art at Newcastle University.

In 2023, three of Richardson's pieces – Origin Stories, Origin Stories (AR), and Halo – were featured in the music video for the Metallica song "72 Seasons".

== Biography ==
=== Selected exhibitions ===
- Attenborough Arts Centre, "Mariner 9", Leicester, UK (2020)
- Scottsdale Museum of Contemporary Art, "Tales on the Horizon", Scottsdale, Arizona, USA (2015)
- Natural History Museum, Vienna, "Mariner 9", Vienna, Austria (2014)
- Albright-Knox Art Gallery, "Kelly Richardson: Legion" (retrospective), Eastbourne, UK (2013)
- Towner Art Gallery, "Legion" (retrospective), Eastbourne, UK (2013)
- Northern Gallery for Contemporary Art, "Legion" (retrospective), Sunderland, UK (2012)
- Le Fresnoy, "Visions Fugitives", Tourcoing, France (2012)
- Albright-Knox Art Gallery, "Videosphere: A New Generation", Buffalo, New York (2011)
- Artpace, "Leviathan", San Antonio, Texas (2011)
- Art Gallery of Ontario, "Sculpture as Time: Major works. New Acquisitions.", Toronto, Ontario, Canada (2010)
- Sundance Film Festival, New Frontier on Main, Park City, Utah, USA (2009)
- Beijing 798 Biennale, Constellations: The Man Who Fell to Earth, Beijing, China (2009)
- Hirshhorn Museum and Sculpture Garden, The Cinema Effect: Illusion, Reality, and the Moving Image – Part 1: Dreams, Washington, D.C., USA (2008)
- Busan Biennale, Expenditure, Busan, South Korea (2008)
- Hallwalls, The Edge of Everything, Buffalo, New York, USA (2008)
- Le Mois de la Photo à Montréal, Exiles of the Shattered Star, Montreal, Quebec, Canada (2007)
- Gwangju Biennale, A Grain of Dust A Drop of Water, Busan, South Korea (2004)

=== Public collections ===
- Albright-Knox Art Gallery, Buffalo, New York, USA
- Art Gallery of Nova Scotia, Halifax, Nova Scotia, Canada
- Art Gallery of Ontario, Toronto, Ontario, Canada
- Arts Council Collection, England
- Hirshhorn Museum and Sculpture Garden, Washington, D.C., USA
- Musée d'art contemporain de Montréal, Montreal, Quebec, Canada
- National Gallery of Canada, Ottawa, Ontario, Canada
- Scottsdale Museum of Contemporary Art, USA
- The Collection: Northern Gallery for Contemporary Art, UK
- Towner Art Gallery, Eastbourne, UK
