= Mike von Joel =

Mike von Joel is a publisher, editor and writer.

He is currently editor-in-chief at State Media and StateF22 magazine.

Von Joel is also Creative Director of Art Bermondsey Project Space, a not-for-profit contemporary art gallery in Bermondsey, London.

== Early life ==
Von Joel was born and raised in Scarborough, North Yorkshire. He is a graduate of Winchester College of Art. His former wife is Chrissie Shrimpton with whom he has four children.

Since 2014 he has been married to former fashion editor and interior designer, Mary Weaver.

== Career ==
Von Joel's former publications include The New Style which ran from 1976 to 1980; Art Line, founded in 1982 which ran for 15 years; Artissues, founded in 1990; artBooknews, also founded in 1990; as well as State of Art, a free newspaper published in partnership with Matthew Flowers from 2005 to 2007; and as editor of Norway based Photoicon which focussed on international photography.
