= Fionnuala Boyd =

British artist

Fionnuala Boyd (born 1944) is a British artist.

== Biography ==
Fionnuala Boyd was born in Welwyn Garden City, Hertfordshire in 1944. She studied at the St Albans School of Art. Much of her work has been in collaboration with her husband, Les Evans. Her work is in the permanent collection of the Tate Gallery and they are known as Boyd & Evans.
