= Movana Chen =

Hong Kong-based artist and curator

- 陳麗雲
- Born: 1974 (age 51–52); Chaozhou, China
- Education: RMIT University
- Known for: Sculpture, fashion, performance

Movana Chen (陳麗雲; born 1974) is a multidisciplinary, Hong Kong–based, female artist, and curator. Her works combine elements of fashion, performance, and sculpture. She is known for her practice of knitting shredded and printed pages into wearable pieces and her artworks have been presented in exhibitions and events in Hong Kong, Beijing, Seoul, London and Paris.

== Early life and education ==
Chen was born in 1974 in Chaozhou, China. She moved to Shenzhen with her family in the mid-1980s and then later to Hong Kong. In the run-up to the handover in 1997, Chen and her family moved to Singapore, where she started pursuing her interest in art and developed an interest in fashion design. She pursued fashion design at the London College of Fashion for a year and later returned to Hong Kong, where she studied accountancy.

In 2005, she received a Bachelor of Fine Arts from the Royal Melbourne Institute of Technology in Hong Kong. In 2007, she received certification in Exhibition Studies and Art Curatorship at the Hong Kong Art School.

== Career ==
She worked as an accountant from 1997 to 2004. After quitting her job as an accountant, she worked as the curator of Hong Kong's YY9 gallery and is currently an independent curator.

== Artworks, style and technique ==
Chen uses shredded magazine paper as material and weaves them into art pieces using conventional knitting needles. She uses magazines published in different languages, which she believes is a way to appreciate different cultures, by turning books and literature into an artistic form.

Her work examines the relationship between clothes, the media, and the use of disposable commodities, while aiming to reduce the distance between individuals and encourage social interaction. Her philosophy is that shredding is a process of transformation, and knitting is a process of creating and communicating.

Her exhibition KNITERATURE, held in 2013, took two-years and 400 books. Knitting Conversations, one of the artworks in the exhibition, is a 15-meter collaborative piece made from books and magazines by 150 participants from the ages of five to ninety from across the globe.

Chen is most known for a style of art called "Body Container", which is magazine paper woven into wearable artwork. One "body container" knitted from shredded Tintin comic books (French version) is estimated to be valued around 150,000 to 200,000 Hong Kong Dollars by Christie's.

== Solo exhibitions ==
- In 2005, White Tube, Hong Kong Art Centre, first solo exhibition, Play with Artbooks The exhibition explored rationality & sensibility between Chen and the art book. She made magazines into stripes and a wearable dress, which she treated as a communication tool, transformed into an installation, photography, painting and sculpture.
- In 2006, Wear Me Out, The Fringe Club Hong Kong
- In 2007, two exhibitions – Play with Artbooks-II, The Fringe Club Hong Kong, and Wear Me Out-II, The 10th Seoul Fringe Festival, HUT Gallery Seoul Korea in which magazines from Hong and Korea were used to create the artworks. They include camisole, pants, bikinis, etc. The audience was encouraged to wear the artwork in the street.
- In 2008, two exhibitions – Two-way Communication, Beijing, and Pekin Fine Arts Beijing, China and Two-way Communication, IFC Mall Hong Kong.
- In 2009, Travelling into my Bookshelf, Shin Hwa Gallery, Hong Kong. Chen used books from her friends as knitting material. It is different from her previous project which used easily disposable magazines, this project emphasized books that contain memories of their owners and the communication with her friends' memories during the knitting process.
- In 2011, Travelling into your bookshelf – Paris, Chinart LaGalerie, Paris. Chen started the project "Traveling into your bookshelf" by using the collection in her bookshelf which included magazines and art books (139 books). She tried to study the relationship between herself and each book. People were invited to donate one book from their own bookshelf from around the world in different languages. She read the books and tried to understand what memories or story her friend wanted to share, to learn new cultures and also establish a new way of communication. In 2009, she traveled to London, Milan, Korea, Michigan, Philadelphia, Sicily, Paris, Melbourne, Hannover, and Turkey to gather the materials.
- In 2011, Body Containers come to life at, K11 art mall, Hong Kong. It explored ways to experiment and perform with the "Body Container", expressing the concept of how the human form embodies ideas about our society, through "wearing" one’s identity.
- In 2013, KNITerature, ArtisTree, Hong Kong. Chen’s exhibition includes works of art from knitted paper. Raw materials such as paper, magazines, books and newspapers were used to create her artworks. The centrepiece of the exhibition, Knitted Conversations, is a two-year collaborative project that features knitted patchwork from more than 150 participants of different countries and ages.

== Selected group exhibitions ==
2005	Beyond the Surface	Artist Commune	Hong Kong
2005	Crossing Path	YY9 Gallery	Hong Kong
2005	My fair Lady	Too Art Gallery	Hong Kong
2006	Paradigm Shift BA (Fine Art) Graduation Show 2006	Pao's Gallery	Hong Kong
2006	New Trend 2006	Artist Commune	Hong Kong
2006	Crackers Hong Kong	Hong Kong Visual Arts Centre	Hong Kong
2007	Art-To-Wear	Gallery Benten 17	Hong Kong
2007	Fashion x Art	LCX Shopping Mall	Hong Kong
2008	ARTHK08, HK International Art Fair 2008	Hong Kong Convention and Exhibition Centre	Hong Kong
2008	Beyond the Body	Galerie helene Lamarque Miami	Paris, France
2008	THE TABLE	Chater Garden Hong Kong	Hong Kong
2008	Shanghai MoCA Envisage II – Butterfly Dream	MoCA Shanghai Museum	Shanghai, China
2009	"Fashion & Art Exhibition" A Global VOGUE Celebration of Fashion	/	Beijing, China
2009	Fashion Ethics "Wear Good" 2009 Cross Genre Exhibition	Gyeonggi MoMA	Ansan, South Korea
2009	Mixed Media and Body Containers on Display	The Opposite House, Swire Hotel	Beijing, China
2010	"War & Peace" The International Fashion Art Biennale in Seoul	Seoul Arts Centre	Seoul, South Korea
2010	"ECHO" Hong Kong Sculpture Biennial 2010	The Chinese University of Hong Kong	Hong Kong
2010	".be Anti-Crisis" DETOUR-DESIGNR-rdv project	/	Hong Kong/Brussels, Belgium
2010	ARTHK10, HK International Art Fair 2010	Hong Kong Convention and Exhibition Centre	Hong Kong
2011	SHOW OFF Solo Show Art Fair	port des Champs Elysees	Paris, France
2011	Ethical fashion Show	Carrousel de Louvre	Paris, France
2011	"Knit Together" Collaboration with Club Monaco & Lane Crawford	Atrium, ifc mall	Hong Kong
2012	Design Futurology	MoA Museum of Art Seoul National University	Seoul, South Korea
2012	THE ART OF DESS	Espace Louis Vuitton	Hong Kong/Singapore
2012	ARTHK12, HK International Art Fair 2012	Hong Kong Convention and Exhibition Centre	Hong Kong
2012	The Sovereign Asian Art Prize Finalists Exhibition	Exchange Square (Hong Kong)/The Sands Expo and Convention Center (Singapore)	Hong Kong and Singapore
2013	CODA Paper Art	CODA Museum	Apeldoorn, the Netherlands
2013	The Sovereign Asian Art Prize Finalists Exhibition	Exchange Square (Hong Kong)/Seoul Auction (Seoul)	Hong Kong/Seoul, South Korea
2014	The Future of Fashion is Now	Museum Boijmans Van Beuningen	Rotterdam, the Netherlands
2014	Elephant Parade Hong Kong	Pacific Place	Hong Kong
2015	Contemporary Istanbul Art Fair	Istanbul Congress Center (ICC) and Istanbul Convention and Exhibition Centre (ICEC)	Istanbul, Turkey
2015	A Tale of Costumes	Espace Louis Vuitton	Venice, Italy
2015	The Future of Fashion is Now	OCT Contemporary Art Terminal (Shanghai)/OCT Art & Design Gallery (Shenzhen)	Shanghai/Shenzhen, China
2015	Mitundohnepunktundkomma	the Thönserstraße in Großburgwedel	Hannover, Germany
2015	Marco Polo in Pinata	Cube 37, Frankston Arts Centre	Melbourne, Australia

== Award ==
2013: Selected one of the 30 Finalists for the 2012–13 Sovereign Asian Art Prize

2012: Selected one of the 30 Finalists for the 2011 Sovereign Asian Art Prize

2009: New York Festivals 2009 Film & Video Awards, Finalist Certificate "Close to Culture: Art Faces" – movana chen i-CABLE News Ltd., Hong Kong

2008: "40 under 40" Creative Talents Award, Perspective Magazine, Hong Kong

== Publications ==
1. KNITerature: The art of Movana Chen (September 2013), ISBN 978-988-1858498
2. Two-Way Communication: The Art of Movana Chen (April 2008), ISBN 978-988-17377-3-1
