= Robert Heller (journalist) =

British management journalist (1932–2012)

Robert Heller (10 June 1932 – 28 August 2012) was a British management journalist, management consultant, author of a series of management books, and the founding editor of Management Today.

== Biography ==
Born in London, England, Heller attended Christ's Hospital in the Sussex countryside, served in the Royal Army Service Corps, and then attended Jesus College, Cambridge, where he was awarded a double first in history.

In 1955, Heller started to work for the Financial Times, where in 1958 he was made US correspondent. In 1963, he moved to become business editor of The Observer.

In 1966, Heller was founding editor of Management Today, a monthly business magazine published by Haymarket Publishing, where he worked for two decades. Here he started a second career as a writer of business books.

During the early 1970s, he started a relationship with gallerist Angela Flowers, whom he eventually married in 2003. They had a daughter, Rachel Heller, born on 15 September 1973, who was born with Down's syndrome, and became an artist represented by Flowers Gallery. Rachel died on 14 September 2023, aged 49.

Heller also had three children, Matthew, Jane and Kate, from his first marriage to Lois Heller (née Malnick).

== Publications ==
Heller wrote about 80 management books. A selection:

- 1972. The Naked Manager
- 1998. Essential Manager's Manual
- 1999. Achieving Excellence
- 2002. Manager's Handbook
