= John Kirby (artist) =

British artist (1949–2025)

- Kirby in 2012
- Born: 2 February 1949; Liverpool, England
- Died: 21 March 2025 (aged 76)
- Known for: Painting

John Patrick Kirby (2 February 1949 – 21 March 2025) was a British artist known for his paintings exploring issues of gender, religion, sexuality and race. His work was compared to that of René Magritte, Balthus and Edward Hopper. Kirby exhibited internationally and his work is held in several collections including the Tate Gallery, the Victoria & Albert Museum, and the Royal College of Art.

== Life and career ==
=== Early life ===
John Patrick Kirby was born in Liverpool on 2 February 1949, and grew up in Tuebrook. He was raised Irish Catholic and attended Saint Cecilia's primary school as well as serving as an altar boy. When he was 16, Kirby left Liverpool to work in London as a shipping clerk and then traveled to Calcutta to help in a children's home headed by Mother Teresa. After moving back to Liverpool, he trained as a social worker and then worked as a probation officer before enrolling in art school at the age of 33.

=== Career ===
Kirby trained at Central Saint Martins and the Royal College of Art in London. He created a large body of work that included both painting and sculpture and has cited his religious background as a strong influence, as well as the "ambiguity of sex and gender" in his work.

Kirby's first major retrospective was held at the Walker Art Gallery in 2012, with more than fifty of his paintings and several of his sculptures. His work was described as "bleak and lonely" and dominated by "solitary figures in strange worlds."

=== Death ===
Kirby died on 21 March 2025, at the age of 76.

== Solo exhibitions ==
- 2014 Play Time, Flowers Cork Street, London
- 2013 John Kirby, Flowers New York
- 2012 The Living and the Dead, Walker Art Gallery, Liverpool
- 2011 Ghosts, Flowers Cork Street, London
- 2010 What Remains, Flowers East, London
- 2009 Home, Flowers Cork Street, London
- 2007 Being Alive, Flowers Cork Street, London
- 2006 Mixed Blood, Flowers, New York
- 2006 Il Polittico, Rome
- 2005 Absent Friends, Flowers Cork Street, London
- 2005 New prints and monotypes, Flowers Graphics, London
- 2003 Someone Else Flowers, New York
- 2002 Flowers Cork Street, London
- 2002 Paintings, Flowers West, Santa Monica, California
- 2000 New Prints and Monoprints, Flowers Graphics, London
- 2000 Il Polittico, Rome
- 1999 Lost Children, Flowers East, London
- 1998 Lost Children, Flowers West, Santa Monica, California
- 1997 In the Dark, Flowers East, London
- 1997 John Kirby, Il Polittico, Rome
- 1996 Art Basel 27, Switzerland
- 1995 The Company of Strangers, Ferens Art Gallery, Hull
- 1994 The Company of Strangers, Flowers East, London
- 1993 The Sign of the Cross, Angela Flowers Gallery, London
- 1992 Homeland, Flowers East, London
- 1991 Homeland, Lannon Cole Gallery, Chicago
- 1991 New York and Related Works, Flowers East, London
- 1989 Still Lives, Flowers East, London
- 1988 Other People's Lives, Angela Flowers (Ireland) Inc., Co.Cork
- 1988 Other People's Lives, Angela Flowers (Ireland) Inc., Co.Cork
- 1987 Artist of the Day, Angela Flowers Gallery, London

== Public collections ==
- Contemporary Art Society
- Ferens Art Gallery, Hull
- Irish Contemporary Art Society
- John Hansard Gallery, University of Southampton
- Royal College of Art Collection
- Tate Gallery, London
- University College of Wales, Aberystwyth
- Victoria & Albert Museum
- René Magritte Foundation, Brussels

== In popular culture ==
Kirby's "Self Portrait 1987" is seen on-screen, and referenced by the character Armand Goldman (Robin Williams) in the 1996 film The Birdcage. In an early scene, Armand defends the fine art to his son, Val (Dan Futterman), who requests his father tone down the décor exclaiming "The Kirby? That's art!"
