= Cry Boy Cry =

Single by Blue Zoo

from the album 2 x 2
- Released: 1982
- Genre: New wave
- Length: 3:56
- Label: Magnet Records
- Songwriters: Andy O, Tim Parry
- Producer: Tim Friese-Greene

Blue Zoo singles chronology
"I'm Your Man" (1982)	"Cry Boy Cry" (1982)	"Loved One's An Angel" (1982)

Audio
- "Cry Boy Cry" on YouTube

"Cry Boy Cry" is a song by British new wave band Blue Zoo, released in 1982 as the third single from their 1983 debut album Two by Two. The song is the band's biggest hit, and their only top 40 entry, reaching No. 13 on the UK Singles Chart in October 1982. It also reached No. 25 in Ireland.
