= Attenborough Arts Centre =

Arts centre in Leicester, England

Coordinates: 52.6245°N 1.1256°W

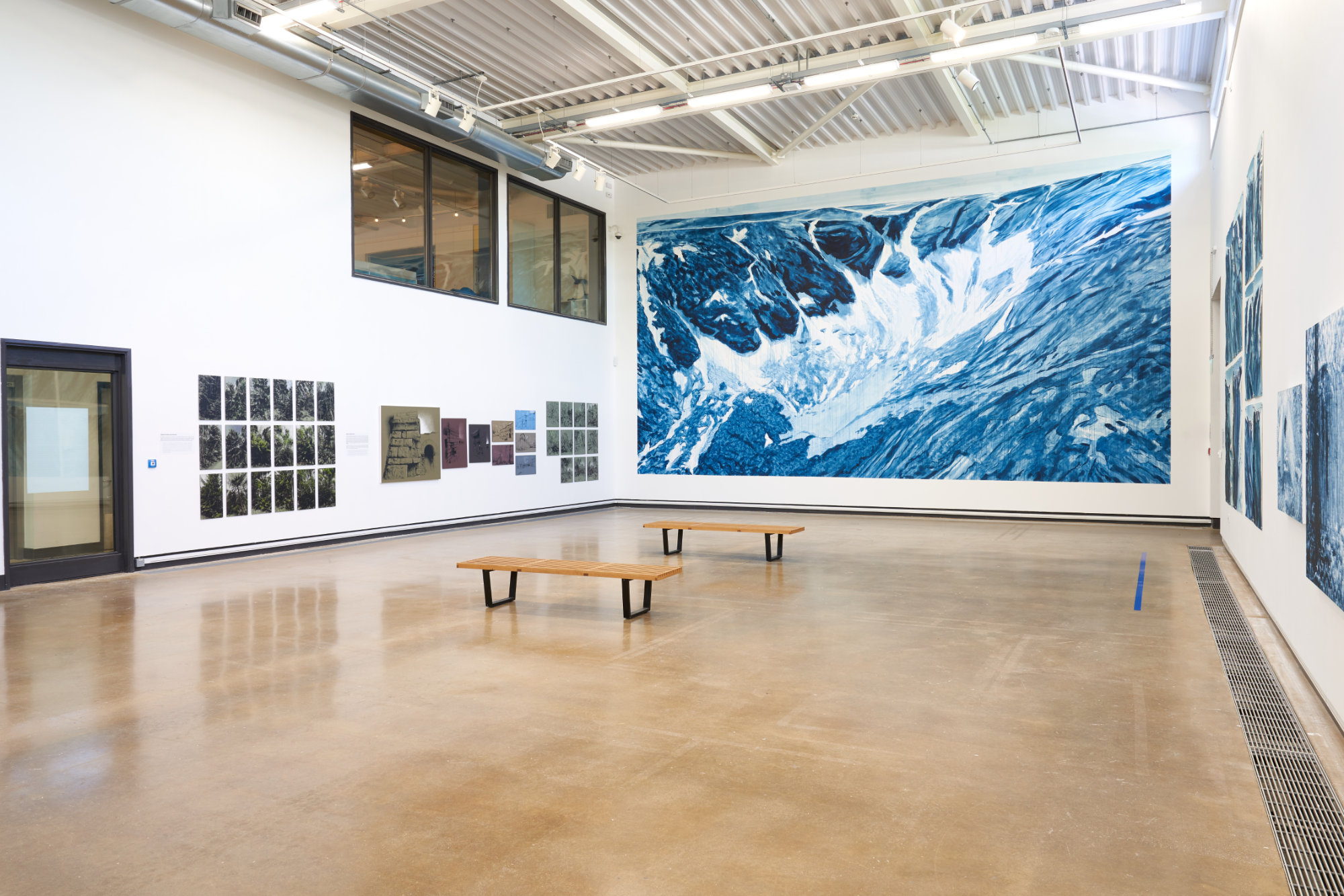
Gallery 1 at the Attenborough Arts Centre, with Mik Godley's Considering Silesia

Attenborough Arts Centre is an arts centre on Lancaster Road, Leicester, United Kingdom. It is the University of Leicester arts centre but also serves Leicester as a whole. The centre's access and inclusive work has been recognised, through multiple awards and grants from Arts Council England, BBC Children in Need, LeicesterShire Promotions, Art Fund and Paul Hamlyn Foundation.

== History ==
The centre is inspired by the work of filmmaker, actor and patron of the arts Richard Attenborough. It was opened in 1997 by Diana, Princess of Wales, after six years of funding efforts from Attenborough, just three months before her death.

With an increase in attendances and a greater demand for a gallery space in Leicester, in 2012 plans were announced for a new 300 square meters of exhibition space to be built on the east side of the building. On 17 November 2015, Sir Peter Bazalgette, Sir David Attenborough and Michael Attenborough CBE opened the Attenborough Arts Centre's new £1.5 million art gallery, one of the largest contemporary art galleries in the region. The building was funded by over 1,000 public donations, Arts Council England and the University of Leicester.

In March 2020 the building was forced to closed during the COVID-19 pandemic and many of the creative courses, performances and events were cancelled. Despite the pandemic, many of courses were able to continue, notably their student-orientated Wildcard Wednesday and History of Art classes. For the international students who were unable to go back to their home countries during the pandemic, the weekly art boxes were received well and were "a relief from the stresses of [the pandemic]." The Attenborough Arts Centre was one of 1,385 cultural and creative organisations across the country to receive emergency financial support from Department for Culture, Media and Sport. This was announced as part of the very first round of the Culture Recovery Fund grants programme being administered by Arts Council England. In March 2021 they announced they had received further support as part of phase two.

In April 2022 Michaela Butter MBE retired as Director of Attenborough Arts Centre, having served 12 years in post. Her successor, Andrew Fletcher, took up the role in April 2022.

== Facilities ==
Attenborough Arts Centre hosts a wide range of exhibitions, performances and Creative Courses. Opened in 2015, this extension doubled the size of the existing building as part of a £1.5 million capital project.

The main Hall has a built-in lighting rig, induction loop, and movable seating. The versatile nature of the space has allowed it to host a range of activities including theatre, music, dance, spoken word and comedy.

== Selected exhibitions ==
- Art, Life, Activism: Contemporary art and the politics of disability (September, 2015) – Tony Heaton, Noemi Lakmaier, Aaron Williamson, Bobby Baker, and photographer David Hevey
- Lucy + Jorge Ortega (January – April, 2016) – Lucy Ortega and Jorge Ortega
- Plant Culture (July – September, 2016) – Gilbert & George, Marc Quinn, Anya Gallaccio, Andy Goldsworthy, Janice Kerbel, Georgie Hopton, Simon Starling, Michael Landy, Hayley Newman, John Newling, Lois Weinberg and John Stezaker, Annie
- Uniforms (September – December, 2017) – Laura Swanson
- Ebb and Flow (January – March 2018) – Steffie Richards
- Altered Landscapes (January – February 2018) – Juan delGado
- Criminal Ornamentation (September – December, 2018) – Yinka Shonibare
- In My Shoes (March – September, 2019) – Rachel Maclean, Bedwyr Williams, and others
- Chainmail 2 (April – June, 2018) – Amartey Golding
- In Out There (April – June, 2018) – Adam Reynolds, Sarah Carpenter, Nicola Lane, Terrence Birch, and Catherine Cleary
- Awkward Beauty (July – October, 2019) – Lucy Jones
- Inspiration Archives (May – July, 2019) – Aaron Williamson
- Let it be felt that the painter was there (November 2019 – February 2020) – Sargy Mann
- Reasonable Adjustment (March 2020) – Justin Edgar
- Mariner 9 (March – November 2020 – Kelly Richardson
- Considering Silesia (June – December 2021) – Mik Godley
- The World is a Work in Progress (September 2021 – January 2022) – Ruth Beale, Michael Forbes, Khush Kali, Vince Laws, Bob & Roberta Smith, Kai Syng Tan, and Jessica Voorsanger.
- Cosmic Garden (September – November 2021) – Yambe Tam
