= Sculpture at Schoenthal =

Coordinates: 47.3594°N 7.7730°E

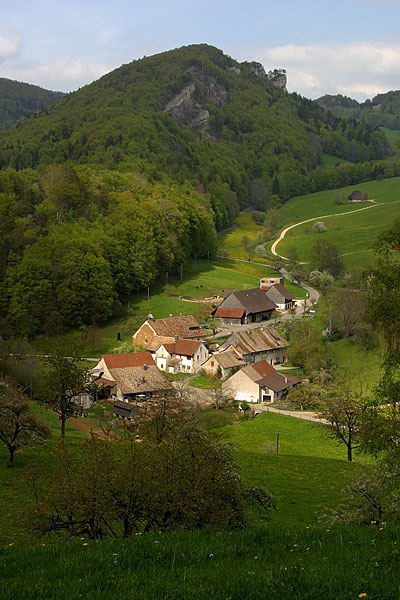
Schönthal, near Langenbruck

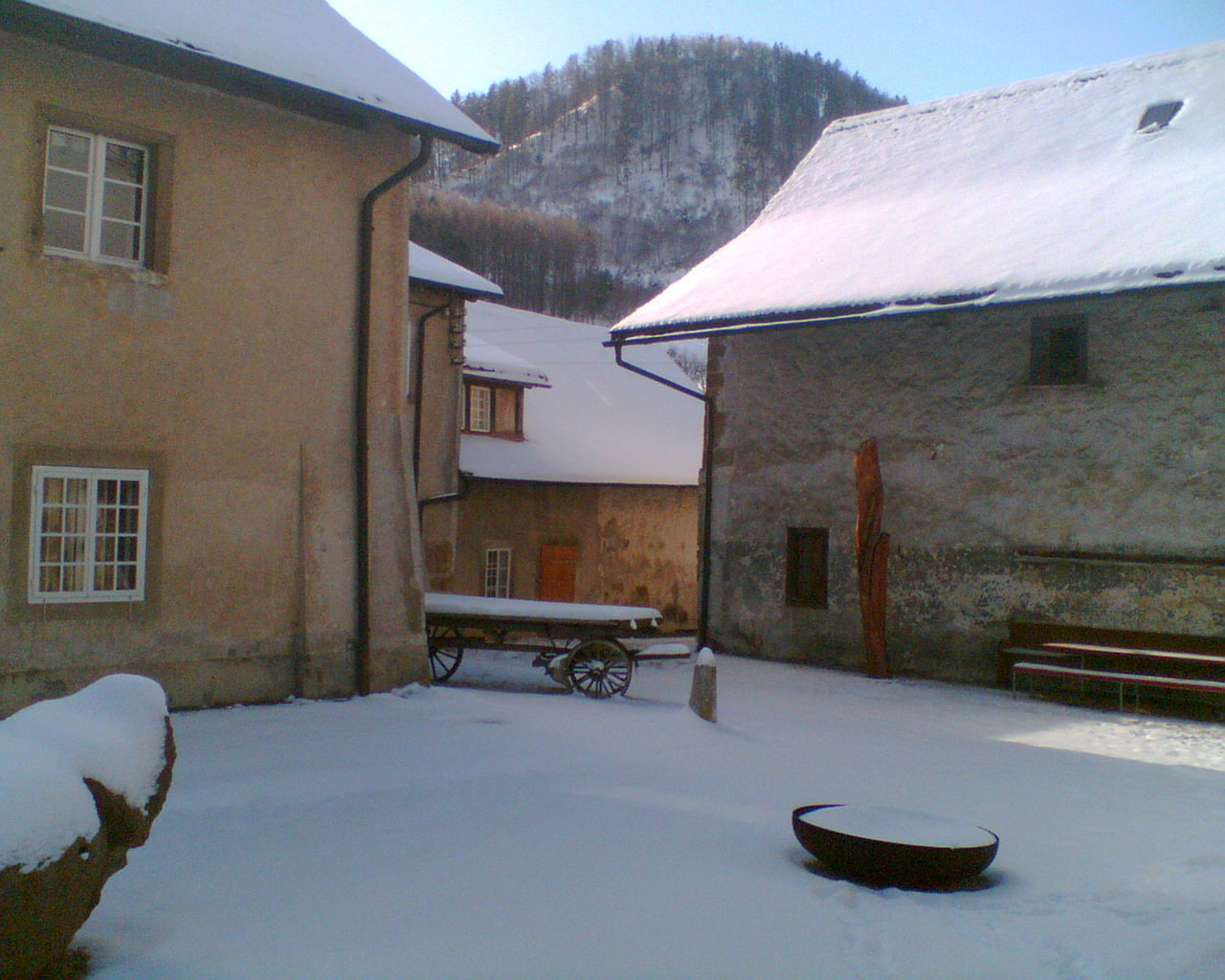
Inner courtyard of the Schönthal Monastery

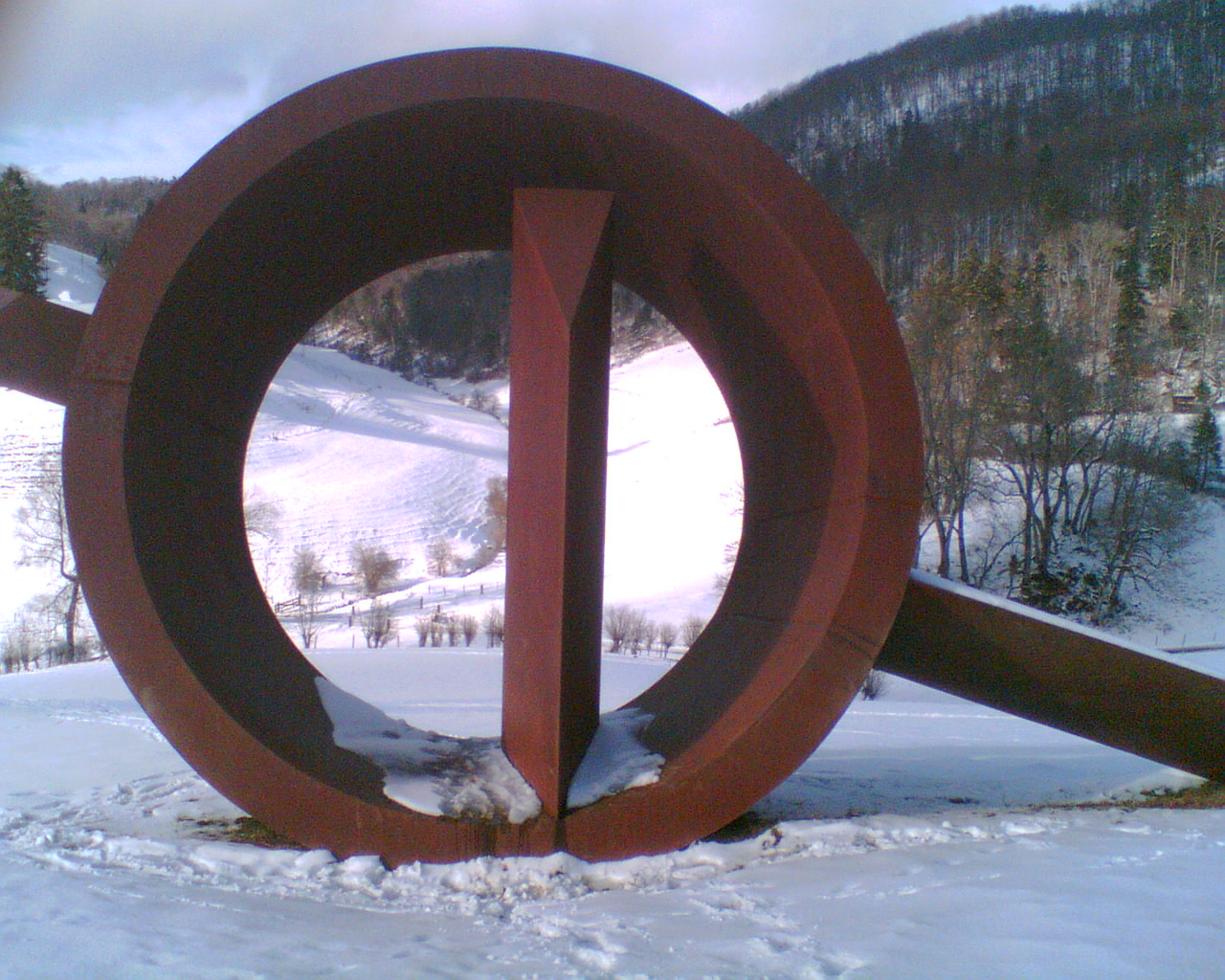
Nigel Hall, Soglio

Sculpture at Schoenthal is an art foundation in Switzerland. It is named after the Schönthal Monastery, a former church near the village of Langenbruck, Basel-Landschaft, which is now used for temporary art exhibitions. An array of sculptures, including some by well-known artists, is dotted around the monastery area and the surrounding countryside.

== The monastery and foundation ==
Schönthal Monastery (German: Kloster Schönthal) was built in approximately 1140. It was annulled during the Reformation in 1529, after which it was used variously as a toolshed, dairy farm and brickworks. In 1967 it was put under cultural heritage management, and in 1986 the first archaeological digs and renovations began.

Sculpture at Schoenthal was opened in 2000 as a "cultural meeting place" incorporating the monastery and surrounding area, with the motto "Art and nature in dialogue". The following year its founder, John Schmid, transferred the entire set-up to the newly established Sculpture at Schoenthal Foundation. The historic building now serves as a gallery for temporary exhibitions and as a seminar venue.

== Sculptures and artists ==
A number of well-known Swiss and international artists have integrated works of sculpture into the surrounding Jura countryside, including Tony Cragg, Nigel Hall, Richard Long and David Nash.
