= Two by Two (album) =

Studio album by Blue Zoo
- Released: November 1983
- Genre: New wave, synth-pop
- Label: Magnet
- Producer: Tim Friese-Greene

Professional ratings
Review scores
Source	Rating
AllMusic	4/5 stars

Two by Two (sometimes written as 2x2 or 2By2) is the debut album of English new wave band Blue Zoo. It contains their October 1982 UK top 20 hit single, "Cry Boy Cry".

The album was produced by Talk Talk's Tim Friese-Greene.

== Track listing ==
1. "Cry Boy Cry"
2. "John's Lost"
3. "Far Cry"
4. "Count on Me (You Can)"
5. "Love Moves in Strange Ways"
6. "Forgive and Forget"
7. "I'm Your Man"
8. "Open Up"
9. "Can't Hold Me Down"
10. "Something Familiar"
11. "Loved One's an Angel" (later CD bonus track)
12. "Cry Boy Cry (Long Version)" (later CD bonus track)
13. "Somewhere in the World There's a Cowboy Smiling" (later CD bonus track)
