= Glenys Barton =

British artist

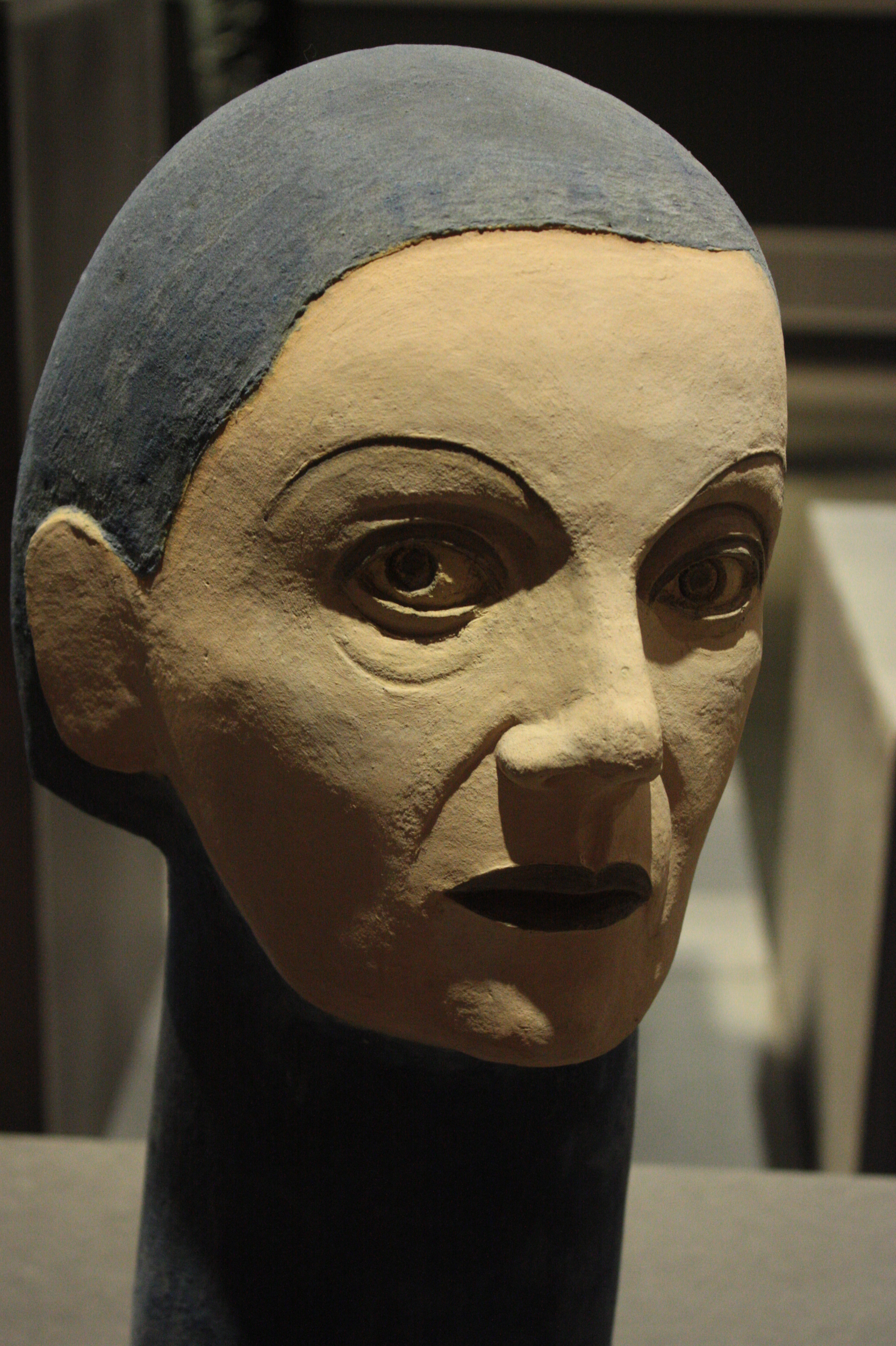
Jean Muir by Glenys Barton 1991

Glenys Barton (born 1944) is a sculptor working mainly in ceramic and bronze.

== Life ==
Barton was born in Stoke-on-Trent in 1944 and now lives in and works in Essex, UK. She studied at the Royal College of Art from 1968-1971, where Eduardo Paolozzi was her tutor.

Barton's ceramic work of the 1970s focused on precise geometrical forms. She was the British prize winner at the International Ceramics Exhibition in 1972 and was invited to serve on the newly formed Crafts Advisory Committee, as its youngest member from 1974-76.

Angela Flowers offered Barton her first solo exhibition in London and Barton has presented regular solo exhibitions with them since 1974.

Two early works are included in the Ceramics Galleries at the Victoria and Albert Museum. These works illustrate her early concern for precision and interest in the use of industrial processes of ceramic production. She has collaborated with Wedgwood. As artist-in-residence from 1976 to 1978 she worked with the Wedgwood Factory, Barlaston, Stoke-on-Trent to produce 26 sculptures.

Since the 1980s her work has centred on the human form, the head in particular. In 1993 her work of Jean Muir was shown in the 'Portrait Now' exhibition at the National Portrait Gallery London and was used as the lead publicity image for the exhibition. The NPG subsequently added a Jean Muir figure to their collection and commissioned a sculpture of Glenda Jackson. Barton's Helena Kennedy and a head of Jean Muir are in the collection of the Scottish National Portrait Gallery.

A monograph on her work, 'Glenys Barton', was published by Momentum in 1997.

She has many sculptures in collections internationally and her work has been exhibited widely in Britain and abroad. Two simultaneous retrospective exhibitions in 1997 examined separate aspects of her work - portraiture at the National Portrait Gallery and her generic figurative work at Manchester Art Gallery. These two shows came together the following year, 1998, at the Potteries Museum & Art Gallery in Stoke-on-Trent, her home town.

In 2004 she worked with Roger Michell and Kevin Loader on the making of the film Enduring Love and became the inspiration for the sculptor played by Samantha Morton. All the sculpture in the film is by Barton including specially commissioned portraits of Daniel Craig and Bill Nighy.

An early Laban dance training and an interest in modern dance continues to inform her most recent work. In 2005 she received a public art commission for Hextable Dance. The work was inspired by the forms and movement of dancers Antonia Grove and Theo Clinkard (Hextable Dance's first resident artists) as they worked with choreographer Rafael Bonachela.

Barton describes her work:

My subject is always humanity: sometimes a specific human, sometimes human relationships, sometimes human society. The forms may be heads, parts of figures, whole figures or figures within figures. Heads and hands particularly fascinate me. As I work I feel that I am directly linked with those who have tried to fashion the human form from the earliest times. My greatest achievement would be to create a timeless image.� Glenys Barton 2011

== Bibliography ==
Exhibition Catalogues

- New Sculpture [Catalogue of the exhibition held at Flowers East 17 September - 17 October 1993] London.
- Artist & Green Warriors [Catalogue of the exhibition held at Flowers East 2 June- 1 July 1990] London.
- New Sculpture and Works used in the Film ‘Enduring Love’ [Catalogue of the exhibition held at Flowers East 22 October – 21 November 2004] London.

Monographs

- Flowers, A., Gibson, R. & Lucie-Smith, E. (1997) Glenys Barton. Momentum publishing, London.
