= Lucy Jones (artist) =

British painter

Lucy Jones (born 1955) is a British painter and printmaker. She was born with cerebral palsy.

Jones is from London and lives in Ludlow, Shropshire.

== Career ==
Jones was educated at the King Alfred School, London and studied at the Byam Shaw School of Art between 1975 and 1977. From 1976 to 1979 Jones studied at the Camberwell School of Art and then at the Royal College of Arts from 1979 until 1982. In 1982 she won the Prix de Rome prize which allowed her to study at the British School in Rome for two years. Jones had her first solo exhibition, at the Flowers Gallery, in 1987. She has exhibited her work extensively in the UK and abroad, including exhibitions at the Attenborough Arts Centre in Leicester in 2019 and at the Christ Church, Oxford Picture Gallery in 2021. Her work is in many public and private collections including the Metropolitan Museum of Art in New York and the National Portrait Gallery in London. Her self-portrait Being 66 won the Ruth Borchard self-portraiture prize in 2021.
