= Hebson =

Hebson is a surname. Notable people with the surname include:

- Bryan Hebson (born 1976), American baseball player
- Nadia Hebson (born 1974), English artist

== See also ==
- Henson (name)
