= Arty (magazine) =

British art magazine

The cover of Arty no. 22 "Romance", published in 2007.

Arty is an independent British art fanzine started by the artist Cathy Lomax in 2001. Lomax is also the editor. Arty is for art fans written by artists themselves and published by Transition Gallery's editions department, the artist-run space in East London.

== History ==
Arty was founded in 2001 in London by Cathy Lomax. It is published twice a year and sold across the UK, including the Tate Modern, Tate Britain and ICA in London.

Frustrated by opportunities for emerging artists to voice their opinions and concerns and inspired by zine culture, artist Cathy Lomax started Arty as an antidote to dry, critic led writing about art. The first 20 issues were photocopied and stapled and featured eclectic artist led content including reviews of contemporary art and numerous exclusive drawings from over 30 prominent and emerging artists from around the world. Themes of past issues have included Entertainment, Boys, Girls, Books, Nature, Alphabet, Scandal, Our Idols, Labels and Reviews London.

From issue 21 the size of the magazine has increased and each issue includes a featured colour. Recent contributors have been Jessica Voorsanger, Sarah Doyle, Rachel Cattle and Gavin Toye.

Arty has featured British artist Stella Vine's drawings and art since 2003. In November 2002, Vine also contributed a drawing on an envelope, Untitled (2002), to the compilation book Arty Greatest Hits In Winter 2003, Vine contributed a drawing to Arty's issue number 13, in which artists were given a letter of the alphabet and asked to make a drawing related to their given letter. Vine's drawing was E is for Eggs, depicting the artist Sarah Lucas with fried eggs on her T-shirt. Vine contributed a drawing Joe eating hash cakes (2004) to Arty 16: Boys

In 2008, Vine was one of 20 artists invited to create a tarot card for Entertainment, the 24th issue of Arty. Vine contributed an acrylic painting on paper called The Tower for her tarot card.

Arty 25: Fame was published in March 2009. It features Jessica Voorsanger, Harry Pye, Gavin Toye, Sarah Doyle, Kim L Pace, Cathy Lomax, Grace Morgan and Carolina Casis.

In 2002, Arty was described by journalist Dave Calhoun in Dazed & Confused magazine as "a fanzine written by artists about art—of all shapes and sizes."

Arty participated in the first Publish and Be Damned fair in London in 2004 and has taken part in all the subsequent PABDs

Althea Greenan, Senior Librarian of Goldsmiths College, London described Arty as "low budget" but "confident" and "sharply relevant". Contributors have included: Jasper Joffe, Stella Vine, Cathie Pilkington, Harry Pye, Cathy Lomax and Jessica Voorsanger.

== Collection ==
A book chronicling the early history of the magazine, Arty Greatest Hits, was published in 2004. The book compiled the best articles and drawings from the first 16 issues, as well as including new work made especially on the theme of Greatest Hits. Articles included reviews of Tracey Emin's exhibition at White Cube gallery, and thoughts on artist duo Gilbert and George. Stella Vine contributed a drawing Joe eating hash cakes (2004) to Arty Greatest Hits
