= John Catnach =

John Catnach (1769–1813) was a Scottish born Geordie printer and publisher of the late 18th and early 19th century.

== Early life ==
John Catnach was born in Burntisland, a former Royal burgh in Fife, Scotland in 1769. His father was the possessor of some Powder mills.

He started work as a bound apprentice to his uncle, Sandy Robinson., a printer in Edinburgh, and on completion of his apprenticeship, moved to Berwick-upon-Tweed in the late 1780s where he founded his own printing business, and then moving on to Alnwick a couple of years later, where he continued his print-shop.

The work produced by Catnach’s business was of very high quality, and at an early stage employed Thomas Bewick to provide the engraving works. Unfortunately John Catnach himself was not a businessman. He was declared bankrupt in 1801 and a sale of assets took place, the assets including about 1200 books were auctioned at Alnwick Town Hall on 2 March 1802, hence the sale advertised in a hand-bill, a rare copy of which is now in the National Library of Scotland

He managed to re-start in business and in 1807 he took on 2 apprentices, one was his son James, and another was a lad named Mark Smith, (see later); a few months afterwards he entered into partnership with William Davison to form Catnach and Davison. Unfortunately this partnership did not appear to work, as it lasted not more than 2 years, after which it was dissolved.

== Family ==
John Catnach (1769–1813) married in Berwick on Tweed (sometime in the late 1780s) Mary (née Hutchinson), (1766 – 24 Jan 1826) a native of Dundee, Scotland. John had been raised as a Roman Catholic and his wife as a Presbyterian, but in the baptismal records of St. Michael’s Church, Alnwick, she is described as a (religious) Dissenter.

They had (at least) 9 children, the first three born in Berwick on Tweed and the remainder in Alnwick. They were – John (? Jan 1789 – 27 Aug 1794), Margaret (26 Dec 1790 – ????), James (18 Aug 1792 – 1 Feb 1841), Mary (26 Feb 1794 – ????), Nancy who became known as Anne (2 Sep 1795 – 20 April 1870), Elizabeth (21 Mar 1797 – ????), Isabella (2 Nov 1798 – burned to death c1811), Jane (c1799 – ????), and John H (? Dec 1802 – 5 Mar 1802)

His son James (18 August 1792 – 1 Feb 1841) (popularly known as "Jemmy" later became famous for the street literature publications produced on his press at Seven Dials, London.

== Midlife ==
John Catnach moving his side of the business to Newcastle in 1808, taking a small shop in Newgate Street.

He took on the printing of John Thompson’s story, Thompson had been a British seaman who lost a leg and suffered at the Battle of Trafalgar, but just as the book was being bound, he died, leaving John Catnach with the entire stock.

He had always been a little irregular with his habits and the way he ran his business, and now that went from bad to worse. He got into more debt and the business suffered from his increasing lack of interest, until eventually he became a bankrupt and as such ended up in the Debtors' prison. He had managed to send his wife and family to London together with a small wooden printing press, some type etc. and other small items which they had managed to secret away.

== Later life ==
The family moved into lodgings in a court off Drury Lane, where they were joined by John in 1812 on his release, but the accommodation was to prove temporary. Very shortly after, they were evicted and moved firstly to a small shop in Wardour Street, Soho (while living in Charlotte Street, Fitzroy Square), followed by another move to Gerard Street, where on 29 August 1813, whilst moving in, he fell down stairs and injured his leg. Although taken immediately to St George's Hospital, Hyde Park Corner, he contacted rheumatic fever, and being already in a run-down state, eventually succumbed, dying on 4 December 1813.

Just to add to the tragedy, the funeral itself was postponed due to an accident to the horse due to pull the hearse. The funeral was re-arranged for the following day, but several of the mourners, including Mark Smith, were unable to attend due to other commitments.

== Mark Smith ==
When the two partners, John Catnach and William Davison dissolved the partnership, the indentures on son James Catnach and the lad Mark Smith became void, and they afterwards worked together as "improvers" in their trade with Mr Joseph Graham, a printer from Fenkle Street in Alnwick. Mark Smith moved away to London and later, on learning that the family had arrived there, went to visit them at their lodgings in a court off Drury Lane. There he helped to set up the press in readiness for John Catnach's freeing from prison. He kept in touch, helped out the family by providing firstly utensils, later paying off the rent arrears and whilst John was in hospital, by working at night-time to finish off the jobs on his books.

== Works ==
These include:

=== from his time in Alnwick ===
- A pamphlet to Farmers "A plain and earnest address" was a rallying call to the yeoman farmers of Britain to stand firm against the political tumult unleashed by the French Revolution and Thomas Paine's "Rights of man". The "Farmer" uses extracts from Arthur Young's "Annals of agriculture" to paint a bleak picture if Britain was to embrace French revolutionary ideals" printed c1792-93
- The History of the Devil, Ancient and Modern, in two parts by Daniel Defoe – 304 pages – c1794
- Many attractively illustrated children’s books – quite a novelty at the time, including :-
  - The Royal Play Book
  - Children's Friend.
  - A Present for Little Masters and Misses
  - The Death and Burial of Cock Robin
- Many Battledores, teaching aids with a letter or letters of the alphabet
- The Beauties of Natural History, selected from Buffon's History of Quadrupeds – 92 pages – c1795
- The Beauties of Natural History – a later volume – c1805
- Poems by Percival Stockdale – with Thomas Bewick woodcuts – c1806
- Poetical Works of Robert Burns – with Thomas Bewick woodcuts
- The Hermit of Warkworth – A Northumberland Ballad, in three Fits – By Dr. Thomas Percy – Dromore is in County Down, Northern Ireland – c1806

=== From his time in Newcastle ===
- The Battle of Chevy Chase – A selection from the works of Dr. Samuel Johnson in two volumes
- "The life of John Thompson, mariner, written by himself: also, his divine selections in prose and verse, from esteemed authors"
- His Divine Selections, in Prose and Verse. From esteemed Authors and embellished with Engravings – c 1810

== See also ==
- Geordie dialect words
- Thomas Allan
- Allan's Illustrated Edition of Tyneside Songs and Readings
- James Catnach
- William Davison
