= Fetish Girl =

Fetish Girl may refer to:

- A pornographic novel written by John Glassco under the pseudonym Sylvia Bayer
- A painting by Cathy Lomax
