= Rosy Wilde =

Gallery in Wardour Street, London

Coordinates: 51.5124°N 0.1333°W

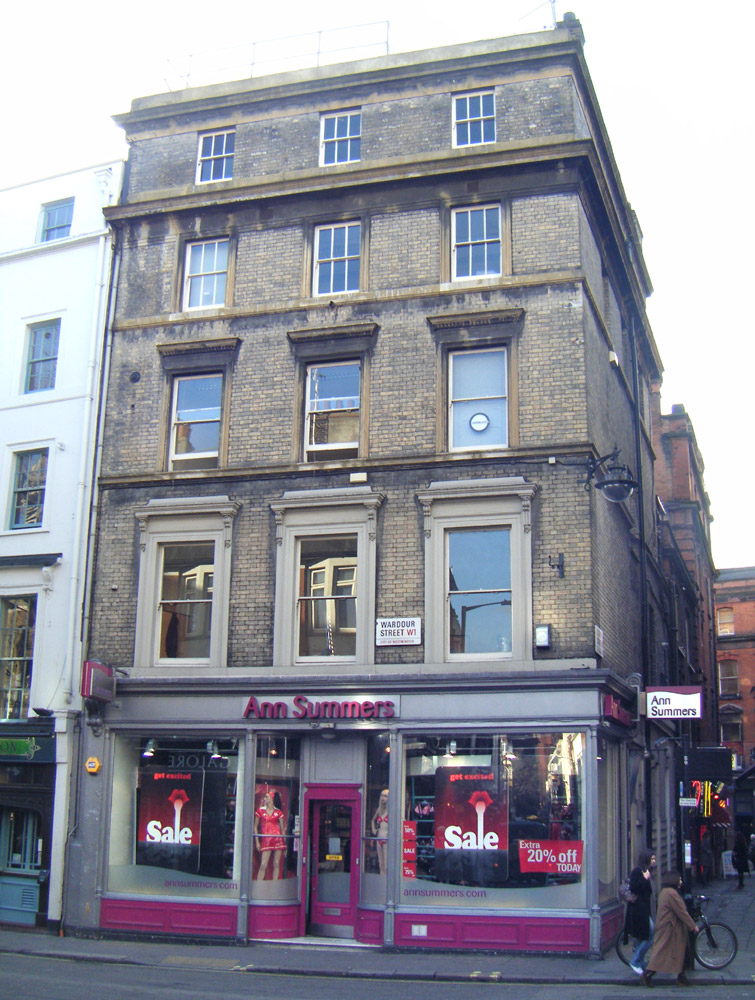
Rosy Wilde in 2006 was above the Ann Summers shop in Wardour Street, London

The Rosy Wilde gallery was an artist-run project space, established in 2003 by British artist Stella Vine in a former butcher's shop below her house in east London, to showcase work by emerging artists. The gallery was not making money and Vine was expecting bailiffs, when one of her paintings of Diana, Princess of Wales, was bought by art collector Charles Saatchi to star in his New Blood show. This solved Vine's financial problems. The gallery was sold at auction in October 2004 and, in 2006, Vine opened a gallery of the same name in central London's Soho district. It closed some time later.

== Whitecross Street ==
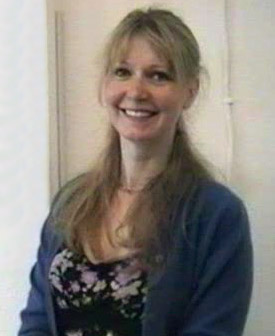
Stella Vine ran the Rosy Wilde gallery

Stella Vine sold her council house, which she had bought with money from working as a stripper, and purchased a derelict three-bedroom house above a disused butcher's shop at 139 Whitecross Street in the City of London, converting the shop space into a gallery. In August 2003, she opened it as the Rosy Wilde gallery, an artist-run project space, to showcase the work of emerging artists, The gallery was given an "immediate Brit Art cache", according to the Evening Standard; Jessica Lack of The Guardian said it was "small but well formed". The Times journalist, Andrew Billen, said the street was "bohemianised" but had remained working class. Vine said she loved "the cosmopolitan chaos" of the area. She lived above the gallery, whilst her son Jamie used the basement. The City and Islington News described the upstairs of the building as being "transformed into one such teenager's bedroom" for the 2003 Fanclub exhibition. The joint show included eight young artists who "littered" two floors with their art work, conjuring up the sense of fan "memorabilia" of icons such as Prince, PJ Harvey, Billy Fury, Brian Wilson, and Elvis Presley, delving into the "psyche of the besotted fan". Lomax's painting of a group of crazed fans was described as "touching", and Yolanda Zappaterra's work as "tongue in cheek". The exhibition summed up as being "successful as a self indulgent wallow in the nostalgia of our formative years."

At one point Vine was "on the verge of giving up because I wasn't making any money." She had not paid any business rates on the gallery for a year, and was expecting the arrival of bailiffs. The proceeds of Charles Saatchi's 2004 purchase of Vine's painting Hi Paul Can You Come Over went to the council bailiff. Islington London Borough Council gave Rosy Wilde an additional month's grace to pay the outstanding debts after they had heard of the Saatchi's purchase. Vine was "bombarded" with phone calls from galleries wanting to show her work and from art collectors seeking to cash in on the "Saatchi effect"; within a week she had sold six paintings. Saatchi also bought more work from her. Vine said, "I can paint and pay the bills. I don’t need any more than that."

Vine described the gallery and living space as a "tip". Journalist Catherine Deveney found it "fascinating, like being placed slap bang in the middle of a person’s entire life" with the walls whitewashed and employed as an improvised diary—"Tuesday 4pm" written in black above the bed— large pink cushions on the big bed, boxes, papers, suitcases and propped-up canvases on the floor, a loaded clothes rail, and art materials on a table. The Times journalist, Andrew Billen, visited Vine in June 2004, and said the gallery was a clue that "Saatchi's Midas touch has not turned Stella's life to gold", describing the empty space and collapsed stairs as "emotional chaos".

On 1 July 2004, the show James Jessop and Jasper Joffe opened. The Evening Standard reviewed the show, commenting that Jessop, who worked as a Group 4 security guard for his day job, had exhibited alongside Vine in Saatchi's New Blood exhibition and that his talent was for speed painting having once exhibited 72 canvasses created in 72 hours.

By June 2004, Vine was in debt for £80,000, excluding money due on the property, had stopped answering phone calls, saying "It seems every call I get now is from someone saying I owe them money." She listed the debts as "comfort shopping" on credit cards, loans, council tax, her car and parking fines, and said she found this very depressing: "I am a very depressed, manic person."

Vine moved to Spain in 2004. She lived in a rundown Spanish farmhouse with her son Jamie, their cat and £20,000 worth of paint and canvas. Vine's house and the shop below it sold at auction in October 2004.

== Wardour Street ==
In 2006, Vine re-opened the Rosy Wilde gallery, this time on the floor above the first Ann Summers sex shop, in Wardour Street, Soho. She held exhibitions for artists such as Jemima Brown whose show at Rosy Wilde was described as "spooky and unhinged". Other artists to exhibit were Annabel Dover, Cathy Lomax and Michael Crowe whilst show titles included Force Fed Brown Bread, Lux, Give Me Your Blacklisted and Vignettes.

Vine said that her priority was independence, so that she preferred "running a cottage industry and maybe earning £50,000 a year" to earning hundreds of thousands but at the cost of participating in a manipulative system.

The Soho gallery later closed.

== Exhibitions ==
Year	Start	End	Show	Artists
Rosy Wilde in East London
2003	31 July	31 August	Olena	Robert Ellis, Sigrid Holmwood, Laura Lancaster, Cathy Lomax, Kate Lowe, Kev Rice, Stella Vine, Rachel Warriner.
2003	5 September	4 October	Vaguely Romantic	Robert Ellis, Tanya Fairey, Sigrid Holmwood, Laura Lancaster, Cathy Lomax, Fiona Lumbers, Dave Smith, Isabel Young
2003	24 October	22 November	YKK	Kev Rice
2003	25 November	25 November	King	Performance: Mark Wilsher
2003	29 November	21 December	Fanclub	Annabel Dover, Sarah Doyle, Antonio Gianasi, Cathy Lomax, Alex Michon, Marcus Oakley, Stella Vine, Yolanda Zappaterra. (performance: Gina Birch)
2004	8 January	1 February	Rising Tides'	Isabel Young
2004	8 January	1 February	Frontin'	Fiona Lumbers
2004	5 February	7 March	Search & Destroy	Alex Gene Morrison
2004	11 March	4 April	Projects	William Cruickshank
2004	8 April	2 May	Something Is Already Happening	Lorin Davies, Michael Wilson, Jacqueline Hallum, Dylan Shipton, Barbara Nemitz, Sara MacKillop, Nichola Williams, Katy Dove, Andy Black, Emily Jo Sargent, Damien Roach (curator: Dan Howard-Birt)
2004	3 June	27 June	Video	Oriana Fox
2004	1 July	25 July	James Jessop and Jasper Joffe	James Jessop, Jasper Joffe
Rosy Wilde in Soho
2006	4 July	29 July	Vignettes	Cathy Lomax
2006	2 August	2 September	Force Fed Brown Bread	Michael Crowe
2006	6 September	30 September	LUX	Annabel Dover
2006	4 October	28 October	Give Me Your Blacklisted	Jemima Brown
