= James Catnach =

Printer and publisher, songwriter and poet (1792-1841)

James Catnach (18 August 1792 – 1 February 1841) was an Alnwick-born printer and publisher of the early 19th century. He became a major publisher of chapbooks in the Seven Dials district of London.

== Early life ==
James Catnach was born in Alnwick on 18 August 1792. He received an education under a Mr Goldie, but his interest in learning was minimal and his attendance spasmodic. In his youth he seemed to spend much of his time as a shepherd.

== His father’s business ==
His father John Catnach, a printer, had been declared bankrupt in 1801. This fact, together with details of the asset sale was advertised in a hand-bill, a rare copy of which is now in the National Library of Scotland.

Father managed to restart the business and in 1807 he took on two apprentices, one being his son James, and another was a lad named Mark Smith, (see later); a few months afterwards John entered into partnership with William Davison to form Catnach and Davison. Unfortunately this partnership did not appear to work, as it lasted less than two years, after which it was dissolved.

John Catnach then moved to Newcastle in 1808, taking a small shop in Newgate Street in which to restart his business..

He made some unfortunate decisions, and the result of these plus his own irregular habits (and drinking) and the way he ran his business, caused him to get into debt, until eventually he became a bankrupt and as such ended up in a debtors' prison. He had managed to send his wife and family to London together with a small wooden printing press, some type etc. and other small items which they managed to secrete away.

Once in London in 1812, the family moved into lodgings in a court off Drury Lane, where they were joined by John in 1812 on his release, but the accommodation was to prove temporary. Very shortly after, they were evicted and moved firstly to a small shop in Wardour Street, Soho (while living in Charlotte Street, Fitzroy Square), followed by another move to Gerard Street, where, after falling down stairs on 29 August 1813, John Catnach was taken to St George's Hospital, Hyde Park Corner, where he died on 4 December 1813.

== Family re-united ==
James Catnach who had been working in Newcastle upon Tyne, joined the family several weeks after his father's death, and shortly after this, the family again moved. He established a printing business around 1813 at 2 Monmouth Court, Seven Dials, utilizing his father's wooden printing press. Tasked with supporting his family, Catnach managed his enterprise to establish a profitable business.

His main-stay was small histories, ballad poetry, broadsides, catch-pennies, and penny awfuls. And the customers who were connected with the catchpenny trade and who frequented his place of business were, in the main, vagrants, miscreants, and the underclasses of society.

After the Napoleonic war, many printers cashed in on the public's demand for news and printed small penny papers, each with a topical story. In 1818 James Catnach printed an edition on a small sheet in which he suggested that certain local butchers in Drury Lane had received two human bodies which they intended to sell as pork. In the ensuing court case he eventually pleaded guilty and was sent to Clerkenwell Prison for 6 months, during which time his mother and sisters manned the presses.

Business improved and c. 1820 James was running 3 presses, all working flat out. By the end of the 1830s James Catnach was at the height of his power, influence and wealth, never employing more than 4 and with only 6 presses, he had a phenomenal turnover, sometimes not even having time to count the number of copies coming of the presses.

== Retirement and early death ==
James Catnach retired in 1838 to a property which he had bought in preparation for this event. It consisted of the "Lion Inn", a disused public house and its grounds at Dancer's Hill, South Mimms, near Barnet in Middlesex, leaving the business to his sister (now) Mrs. Anne (baptised Nancy) Ryle. He never married and kept his Northumberland burr.

He did not long survive his retirement and was buried in Highgate Cemetery, in one of the two plots that his sister had purchased earlier. The official number of the grave is 256, Square 29, over which is placed a flat stone, inscribed : —

IN MEMORY OF

JAMES CATNACH,

Of Dancer's Hill.

DIED 1 February 1841,

Aged 49.

He left somewhere between £3,000 and £10,000 depending upon which story you want to believe.

== Mark Smith ==
When the two partners, John Catnach and William Davison dissolved the partnership, the indentures on son James Catnach and the lad Mark Smith became void, and they afterwards worked together as "improvers" in their trade with Mr Joseph Graham, a printer from Fenkle Street in Alnwick. Mark Smith moved away to London and later, on learning that the family had arrived there, went to visit them at their lodgings in a court off Drury Lane. There he helped to set up the press in readiness for John Catnach's freeing from prison. He kept in touch, helped out the family by providing firstly utensils, later paying off the rent arrears and whilst John was in hospital, by working at night-time to finish off the jobs on his books. James Catnach kept in touch with Mark and visited him in Alnwick on more than one occasion.

== Works ==
These include:
One class of literature which Jemmy Catnach made almost his own, was children's farthing and halfpenny books. Among these are:

  - The Tragical Death of an Apple Pie
  - The House that Jack Built
  - Jumping Joan
  - The Butterflys' Ball and Grasshoppers' Feast
  - Jerry Diddle and his Fiddle
  - Nurse Love-Child's Gift
  - The Death and Burial of Cock Robin
  - The Cries of London
  - Simple Simon
  - Jacky Jingle and Suky Shingle
  - He advertised them as "Here you have just printed and published, and adorned with ten beautiful and elegantly engraved embellishments, and for the low charge of one farden – Yes ! one farden buys" (A farding is an obsolete or dialectal form of the word farthing)
- The story of the Battle of Waterloo — (this last and 16th of the decisive battles at which Napoleon was finally overthrown, and took place i8 June 1815)
- Old Songs and Ballads.— A Collection of 35 most Curious Old Songs and Ballads, printed at Seven Dials, on rough old straw paper, and illustrated with quaint and rude woodcuts or engravings
- He also wrote many verses and songs, most of which he also printed on broadsides and chapbooks.
- In the British Museum there is a collection of upwards of 4,000 ballads in two folio volumes – all printed by James Catnach
- St Bride Library, Fleet Street, holds a substantial collection of broadsides and ballads, printed by Catnach and his successor William Fortey.

== See also ==
- Geordie dialect words
- Thomas Allan
- Allan's Illustrated Edition of Tyneside Songs and Readings
- John Catnach
- William Davison
