= Andrew Nairne =

British curator

Andrew Colin Nairne OBE (born 10 February 1960), is director of Kettle's Yard, the University of Cambridge’s modern and contemporary art gallery.

== Life and career ==
Born in Guildford, Nairne graduated with an art history MA from the University of St Andrews in 1983. He was the Visual Arts Director at the Scottish Arts Council and for eight years he was the exhibitions director at the Centre for Contemporary Arts in Glasgow. He has also had a position at the Ikon Gallery in Birmingham and was director of Dundee Contemporary Arts. His current role is director of Kettle's Yard in Cambridge

Nairne is the former director of Modern Art Oxford, a contemporary art gallery in Oxford. He joined in 2001, when he renamed the gallery from the Museum of Modern Art, Oxford. Nairne coordinated enhancements to the museum building, and gave MOMA's substantial library of art books and catalogues to Oxford Brookes University. He shifted the focus to exhibitions of contemporary artists, who have included Tracey Emin and Stella Vine.

From 1998 to 2003, Nairne was a board member of the Pier Arts Centre in Stromness, Orkney. He was formerly chair of the Visual Arts and Galleries Association (VAGA). He was also visiting fellow at Nuffield College, Oxford.

Nairne was formerly executive director of arts strategy at the Arts Council England.

He received the Order of the British Empire in the 2019 New Year Honours for services to Museums and to the Arts.
