= The Alnwick Playhouse =

Alnwick Playhouse Arts Centre
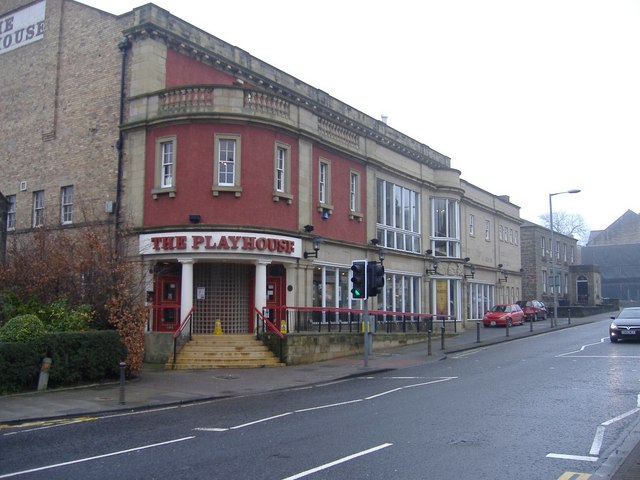
- Interactive map of Alnwick Playhouse Arts Centre
- Address: Bondgate Without; Alnwick, Northumberland; England
- Coordinates: 55.41253°N 1.70292°W
- Owner: Alnwick Playhouse District Trust
- Capacity: 265(auditorium) and 60 (studio hub)
- Current use: Theatre/Cinema/Arts Centre

Construction
- Opened: 1925
- Rebuilt: 1990 & 2019
- Years active: 1925-1979 & 1990-Present

Website
- alnwickplayhouse.co.uk

The Alnwick Playhouse is an arts centre, theatre and cinema in the town of Alnwick in Northumberland, England. It is a cultural hub, offering a diverse programme of theatre, music, film, community events and more. Alnwick Playhouse is a registered charity committed to inspiring creativity and enriching lives through the arts.

The venue includes an auditorium seating over 250 people, a studio space seating 60 people, a visual art gallery, cafe, and bar. The organization works with local communities to offer access to art and culture.

== History ==
The Playhouse was originally built in 1925 as a 700-seat cinema and occasional music hall. The Playhouse eventually closed in 1979. The NTC Touring Theatre Company bought the building and converted the ground floor. The upper floor was leased out to The Alnwick District Playhouse Trust who re-opened the newly refurbished Alnwick Playhouse in December, 1990. It has remained open since then.

== See also ==
- Alnwick
