= Alnwick =

Town and civil parish in Northumberland, England

- Town
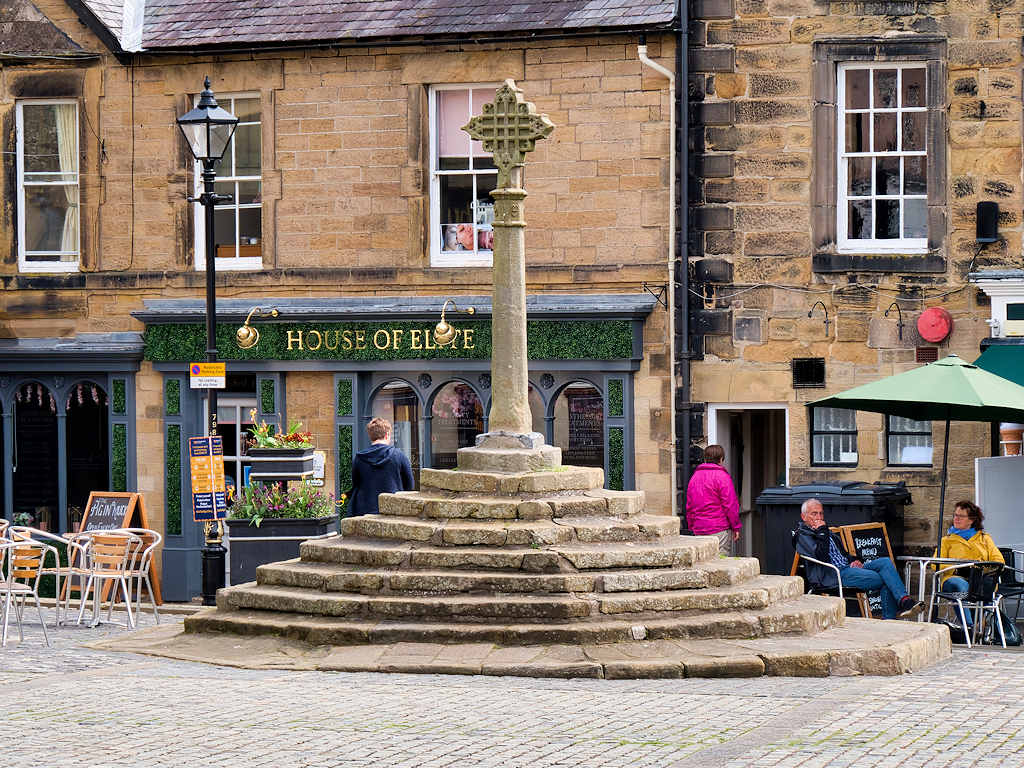
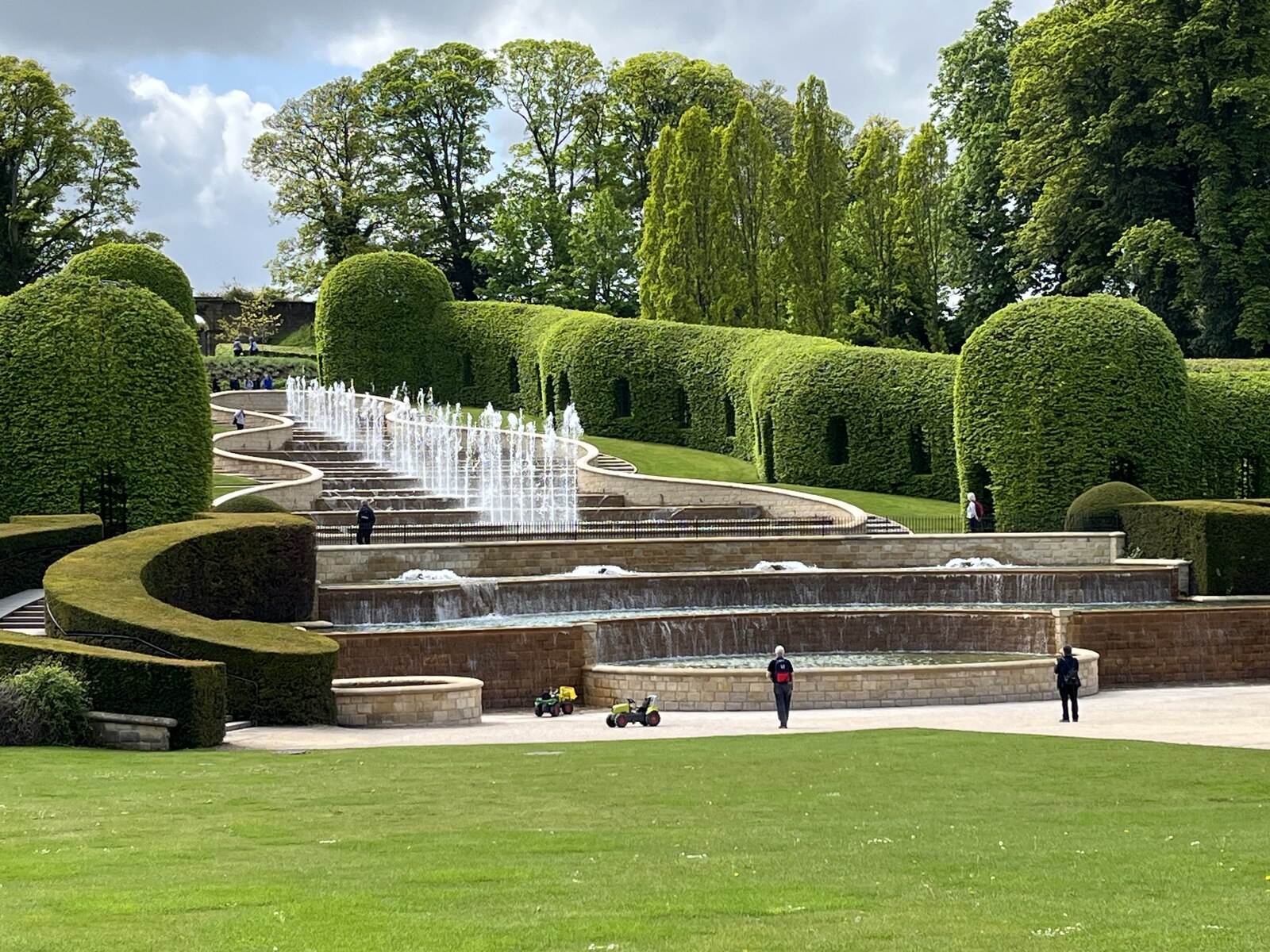
- Alnwick Castle Market Cross Alnwick Garden

- Location within Northumberland
- Population: 8,430 (2021 Census)
- OS grid reference: NU186129
- Civil parish: Alnwick
- Unitary authority: Northumberland
- Ceremonial county: Northumberland
- Region: North East
- Country: England
- Sovereign state: United Kingdom
- Post town: ALNWICK
- Postcode district: NE66
- Dialling code: 01665
- Police: Northumbria
- Fire: Northumberland
- Ambulance: North East
- UK Parliament: North Northumberland

Alnwick (/ˈænɪk/ AN-ik) is a market town in Northumberland, England, of which it is the traditional county town. The population at the 2021 Census was 8,430.

The town is 32 miles (51 km) south of Berwick-upon-Tweed and the Scottish border, 5 miles (8 km) inland from the North Sea at Alnmouth and 34 miles (55 km) north of Newcastle upon Tyne; it is sited on the south bank of the River Aln.

The town dates to about AD 600 and thrived as an agricultural centre. Alnwick Castle was the home of the most powerful medieval northern baronial family, the Earls of Northumberland. It was a staging post on the Great North Road between Edinburgh and London.

== Toponymy ==
The name Alnwick comes from the Old English wic ('dairy farm, settlement') and the name of the river Aln.

== History ==
Alnwick Castle viewed from the Pastures, on the other side of the river Aln

The history of Alnwick is the history of the castle and its lords, starting with Gilbert Tyson (written variously as "Tison", "Tisson" and "De Tesson"), one of William the Conqueror's standard-bearers, upon whom this northern estate was bestowed. It was held by the De Vesci family (now spelt "Vasey" – a name found all over south-east Northumberland) for over 200 years and then passed into the hands of the House of Percy in 1309.

The castle was founded as a timber structure by Ivo de Vesci in about 1096. In 1136, it was first recorded as being captured by David I of Scotland. In 1147, Alnwick Abbey was founded for Premonstratensian canons, a short distance west of the castle. At about the same time, the castle was rebuilt in stone.

At various points in the town are memorials of the constant wars with the Scots, in which so many Percys spent the greater part of their lives. A cross near Broomhouse Hill across the river from the castle marks the spot where Malcolm III of Scotland was killed, during the first Battle of Alnwick in 1093. At the side of the broad shady road called Ratten Row, leading from the West Lodge to Bailiffgate, a stone tablet marks the spot where William the Lion of Scotland was captured during the second Battle of Alnwick in 1174 by a party of about 400 mounted knights, led by Ranulf de Glanvill.

Hulne Priory, outside the town walls in Hulne Park, the Duke of Northumberland's walled estate, was a friary founded in about 1240 for the Carmelites by William de Vesci. It is said that the site was chosen for some slight resemblance to Mount Carmel where the order originated.

In 1314, Sir John Felton was governor of Alnwick. During the 14th century the Percys did extensive work on the castle, adding new towers in the outer wall, strong gates to the wall and keep, and new domestic apartments. After the Percys challenged King Henry IV, the king moved against their castles, taking Alnwick in 1403, despite its improvements.

In winter 1424, much of the town was burnt by a Scottish raiding party. Again in 1448, the town was burnt by a Scottish army led by William Douglas, 8th Earl of Douglas and George Douglas, 4th Earl of Angus. Following these setbacks, in the 15th century both monastic houses gained defensive towers and the town was walled.

In addition to the threat from Scotland, Alnwick was heavily contested in the Wars of the Roses. It was held for Henry VI until the Lancastrian collapse of 1461, when it fell to Edward IV. That winter the Lancastrians recaptured it but, in July 1462, the Yorkists retook it. By the autumn, the Lancastrians were again in possession and quickly came under Yorkist siege. Despite Franco-Scottish reinforcements, the Lancastrians abandoned the castle to the Yorkists in January 1463, though by May they had regained it through betrayal. On 23 June, it was surrendered to the Yorkists for the final time. According to historian Dan Spencer, this made Alnwick the most besieged place in the country in the Wars of the Roses. Sir Thomas Malory mentions Alnwick as a possible location for Lancelot's castle Joyous Garde.

In the English Reformation, monastic life at Alnwick came to an end, with both Alnwick Abbey and Hulne Priory being suppressed in 1539. Shortly afterwards, the Percys also left Alnwick to decay, only resuming residence in the mid-18th century. Since then the Percys have remained at Alnwick. There was a Church of Scotland congregation in Alnwick in the 17th and 18th centuries.

A Royal Air Force distribution depot was constructed at Alnwick during the Second World War with four main fuel storage tanks (total capacity 1700 tons) and road and rail loading facilities. The tanks were above ground and surrounded by concrete. The site was closed in the 1970s, and its demolition and disposal were completed in 1980.

The Alnwick by-pass takes the A1 London–Edinburgh trunk road around the town; it was opened in 1968.

== Geography ==
Alnwick lies at 55°25′00″N 01°42′00″W (55.417, -1.700)^{1}. The River Aln forms its unofficial northern boundary.

== Governance ==
The rear view of Alnwick Town Hall (the main entrance is in the Market Place)

Historically, the town was partly within the Bamburgh Ward and Coquetdale Ward and later included in the East Division of Coquetdale Ward in 1832. Alnwick Town Hall was the home of the common council of Alnwick. By the time of the 2011 Census, an electoral ward covering only part of Alnwick parish existed. The total population of this ward was 4,766.

== Economy ==
Barter Books in Alnwick

Some major or noteworthy employers in the town are:

- Barter Books, one of the largest second-hand bookshops in England, set in the town's former railway station
- Quotient Sciences Alnwick, a large pharmaceutical manufacturing, research and testing centre
- NFU Mutual, provider of insurance, pensions and investments
- Department for Environment, Food and Rural Affairs
- House of Hardy, well-known supplier of fly-fishing equipment with retail space, manufacturing and a museum.

== Education ==
Primary schools in Alnwick include Swansfield Park Primary School, St Pauls' Catholic Primary School, NCEA Harry Hotspur C of E Primary School, and Barndale school (which specialises in special education). Secondary schools in Alnwick include The Duchess's Community High School.

== Landmarks ==
The town's greatest building is Alnwick Castle, one of the homes of the Duke of Northumberland, and site of The Alnwick Garden. The castle has extensive grounds landscaped by Capability Brown, which include several follies as well as the ruins of St Leonard's Hospital, Alnwick Abbey and Hulne Priory.

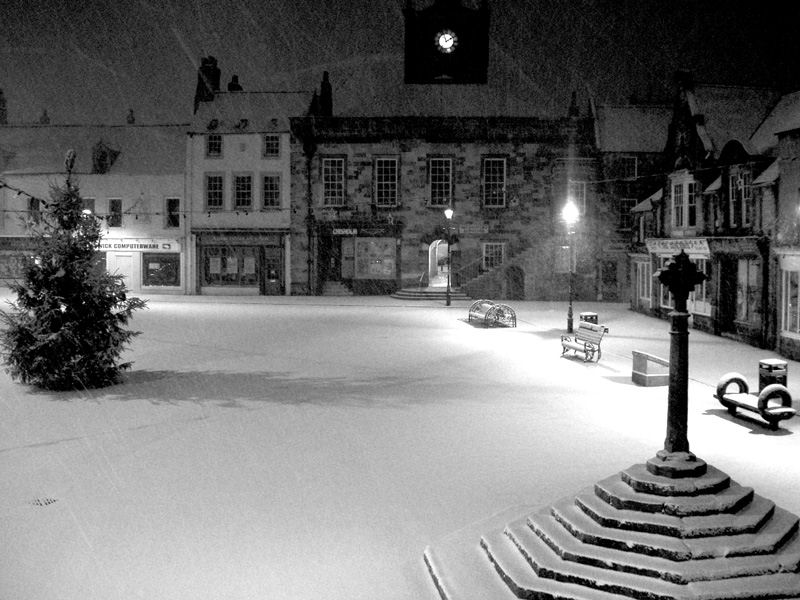
Alnwick marketplace at night in winter

The town centre is the marketplace, with its market cross and the 19th century Northumberland Hall, used as a meeting place.

The Alnwick Playhouse is a thriving multi-purpose arts centre that stages theatre, dance, music, cinema and visual arts productions.

In 2003, the Willowburn Leisure Centre was opened on the southern outskirts of the enlarged town; it replaced the old sports centre located by the Lindisfarne Middle School and the now-demolished youth centre.

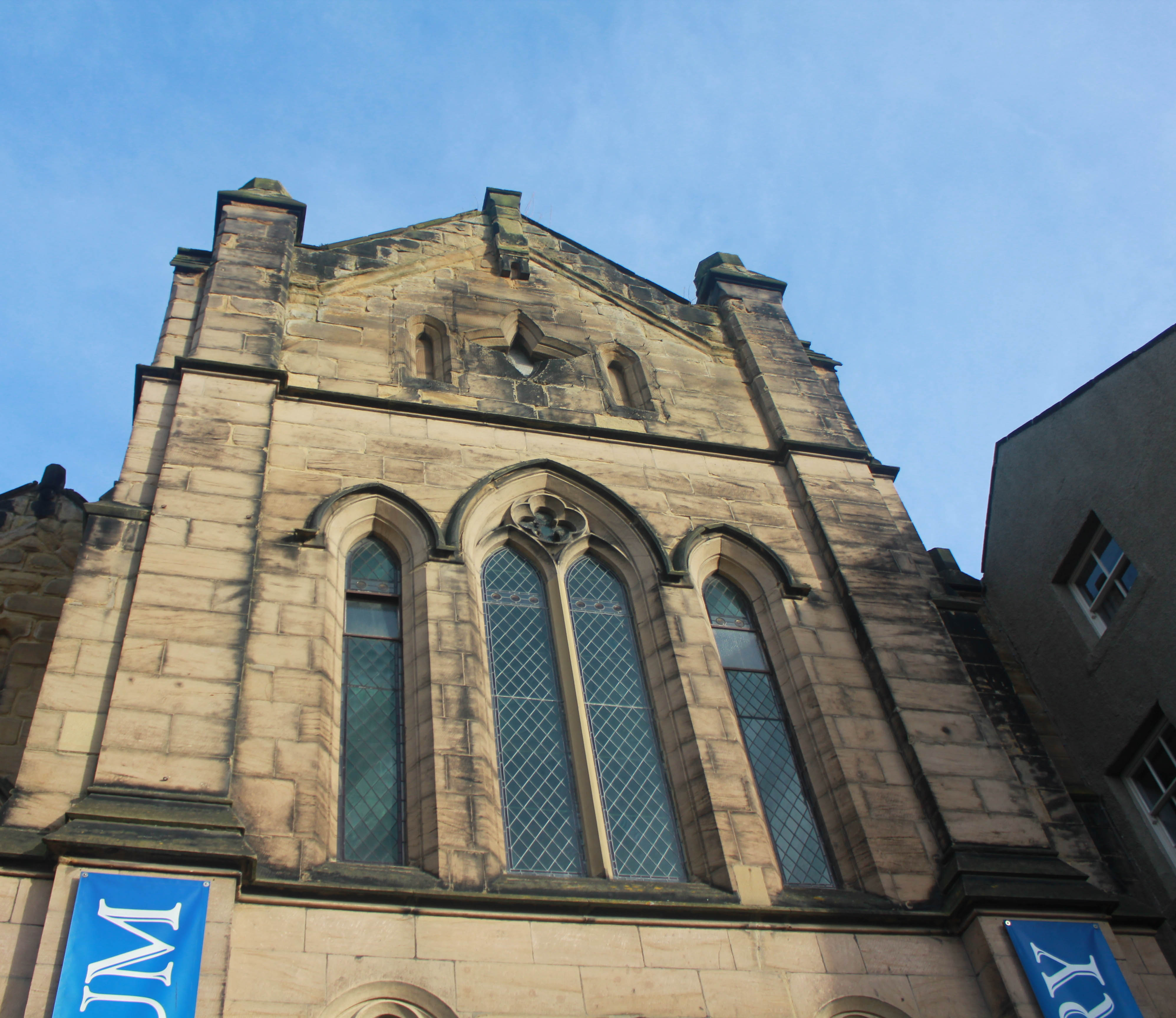
Bailiffgate Museum, a local history museum

Alnwick's museum, Bailiffgate Museum, is close to the Bailiffgate entrance to the castle. Its collection is dedicated to local social history and has recently had a major refit funded by the Heritage Lottery Fund. Its collection includes a variety of agricultural objects, domestic items, railway items, coal mining artefacts, printing objects, a sizeable photographic collection, paintings and a range of activities for children.

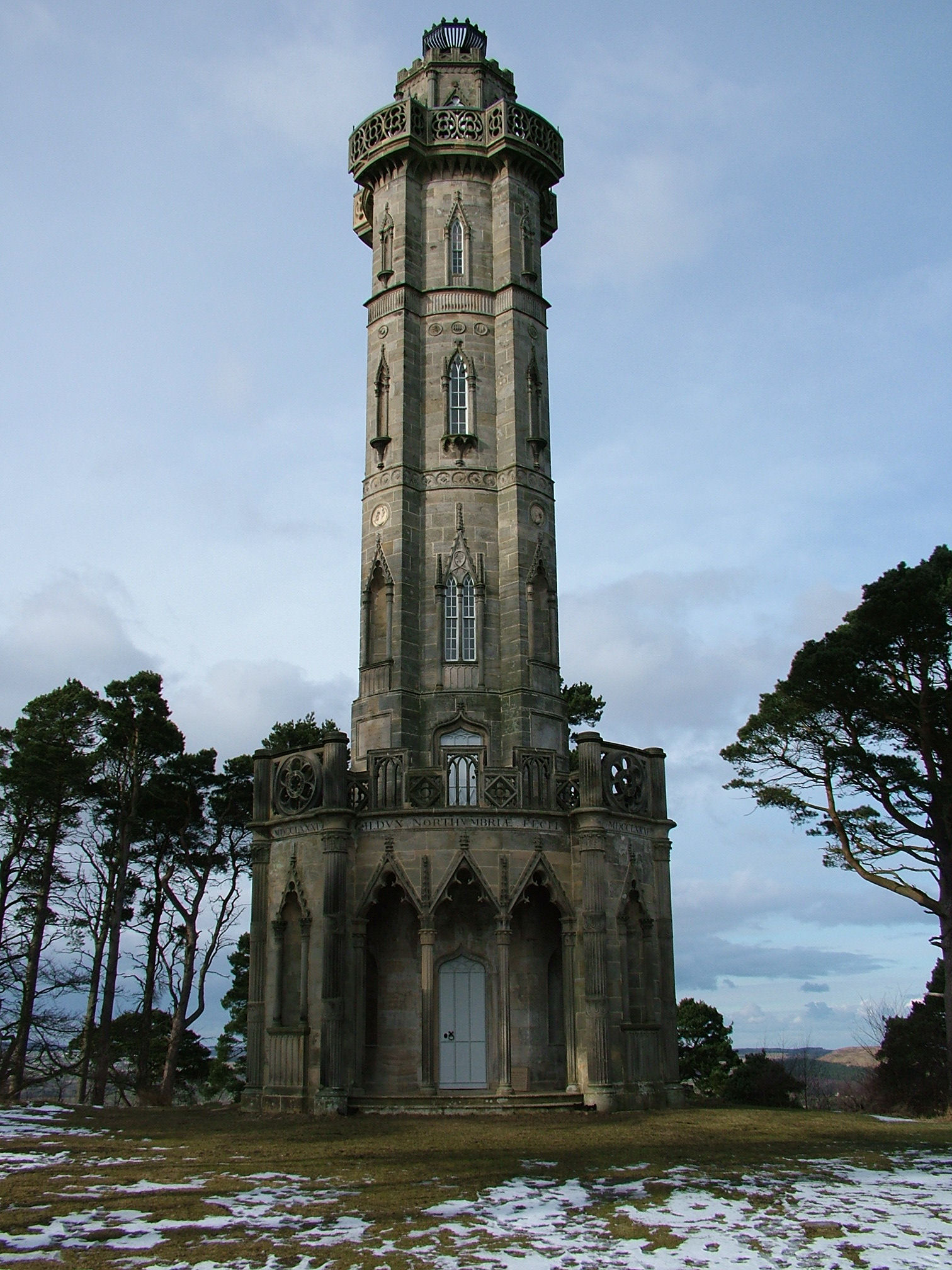
Brizlee Tower, a folly and observation platform overlooking Hulne Park, the Duke of Northumberland's walled estate by Alnwick Castle

Other places of interest in and near the town include:

- Alnwick railway station (closed in 1968), a listed building and now a secondhand bookshop.
- the Bondgate Tower, also known as the Hotspur Tower or Hotspur Gate, the only upstanding survival of the medieval town wall and named after Sir Henry Percy, also called Harry Hotspur, the eldest son of the 1st Earl of Northumberland.
- Brizlee Tower, a Grade I listed folly tower on a hill in Hulne Park, the Duke's walled estate, designed by Robert Adam in 1777 and erected in 1781 for Hugh Percy, 1st Duke of Northumberland.
- Camphill Column, an 1814 construction celebrating British victories in Europe and possibly erected as a reaction against the French Revolution.
- the Fenkle Street drill hall converted from a library in 1887.
- the Fusiliers Museum of Northumberland, found within Alnwick Castle.
- The Nelson Memorial, Swarland, emphasising a local link to the admired Admiral.
- the Pottergate Tower, a Gothick eye-catcher of 1768 straddling Pottergate on the site of the medieval gate.
- RAF Boulmer was an airfield during World War II. It now has a role in early warning radar surveillance and communications.
- St Leonard's Hospital Chapel, within the castle park. Meagre ruins of c. 1200 from a hospital founded for the soul of King Malcolm of Scotland.
- St Mary's Chantry, in Walkergate, the ruins of a medieval chantry house licensed in 1448.
- St Michael's Church on Bailiffgate, the main parish church of the town, a Grade I listed building dating from the 15th century with fragments from the 12th century.
- the Tenantry Column—much in the style of Nelson's Column, 83 feet (25 m) tall and topped by the Percy Lion, the symbol of the Percy family—designed by Charles Harper and erected for Hugh Percy, 2nd Duke of Northumberland in 1816 in gratitude to the Duke.
- the White Swan Hotel, an 18th-century coaching inn that now houses the First Class Lounge and other fittings from the Titanic's near-identical sister ship RMS Olympic.

== Sport ==
- Alnwick RFC
- Alnwick Town A.F.C.

== Local media ==
Local news and television programmes is provided by BBC North East and Cumbria and ITV Tyne Tees. Television signals are received from the Chatton TV transmitter.

Alnwick's local radio stations are BBC Radio Newcastle on 96.0 FM, Hits Radio North East on 102.6 FM and Lionheart Radio on 107.3 FM, a community-based radio station.

The Northumberland Gazette is the town's local newspaper.

== Events ==
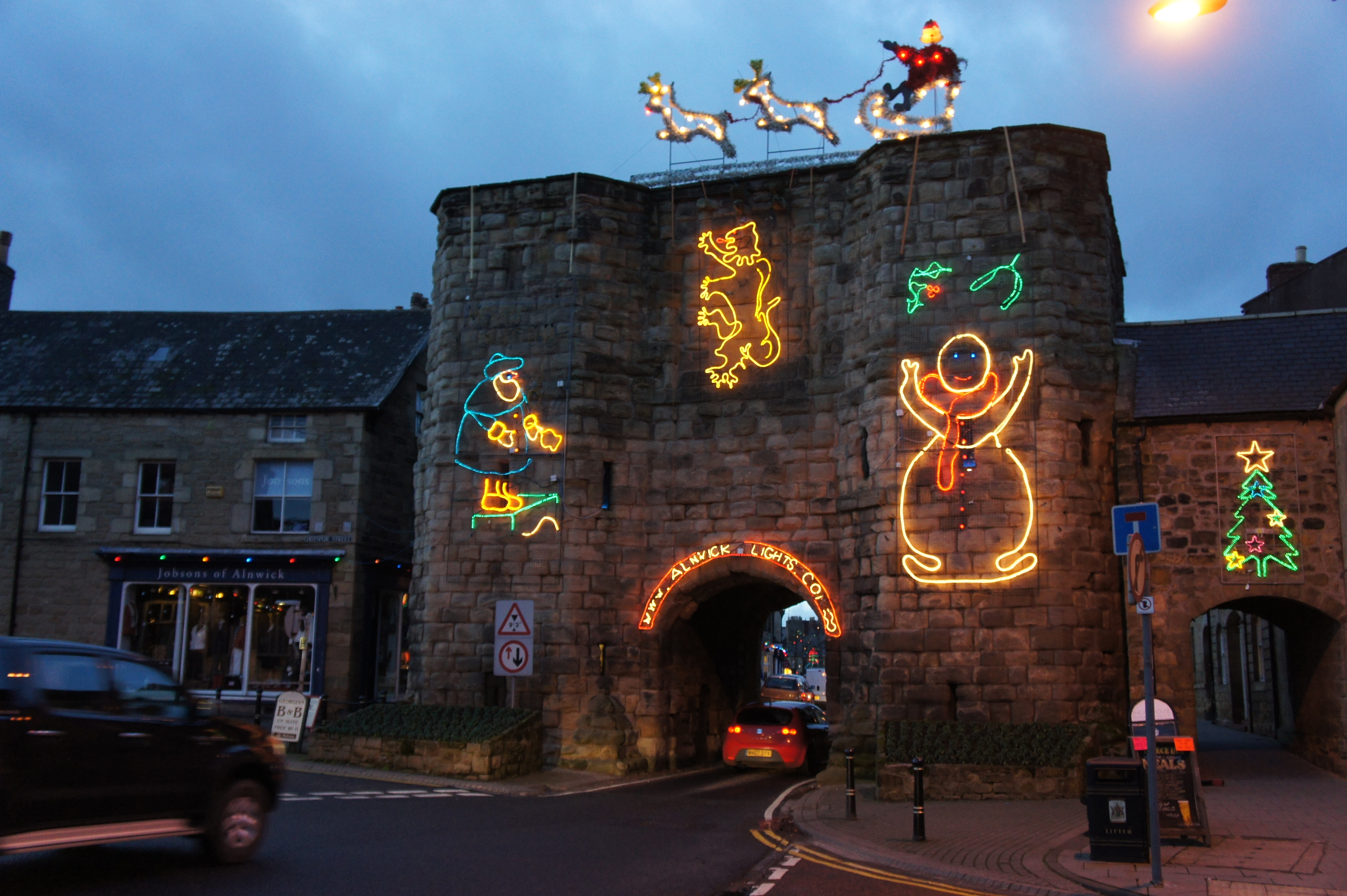
Bondgate Tower with its Christmas lights (2012)

Alnwick Fair was an annual costumed event, held each summer from 1969 to 2007, recreating some of the appearance of medieval trading fairs and 17th century agricultural fairs.

== Transport ==
=== Road ===
Bondgate Tower

Alnwick lies adjacent to the A1, the main national north–south trunk road, providing easy access to Newcastle upon Tyne (35 miles (56 km) south) and Edinburgh (80 miles (130 km) north).

=== Rail ===
The nearest National Rail station is at Alnmouth, about 4 miles (6 km) away. London North Eastern Railway operates services between Edinburgh Waverley (journey time approximately 1h:10m) and London King's Cross (journey time approximately 3h:45m) on the East Coast Main Line. It has a weekday service of 15 trains per day north to Edinburgh and 13 trains per day south to London.

The Alnwick branch line formerly linked Alnwick railway station to Alnmouth, but this line closed in January 1968. Since the 2010s, the Aln Valley Railway Trust have worked to reopen the branch as a heritage railway but, due to construction of the A1 Alnwick bypass removing a section of the original trackbed on the edge of the town, their purpose-built station at Alnwick Lionheart is located near the Lionheart Enterprise Estate on the outskirts of the town. The reopening project is ongoing and, as of July 2020, the line's eastern terminus had reached a new station at Greenrigg Halt, approximately 1.5 miles (2.4 km) from Lionheart; it is yet to carry passengers over the full length.

=== Air ===
Newcastle Airport lies around 45 minutes away and provides 19 daily flights to London Heathrow, Gatwick, Stansted and London City, with regular flights to other UK and European centres.

== Twin towns ==
Alnwick is twinned with:

- Bryne, Norway
- Lagny-sur-Marne, France
- Voerde, Germany

== Notable people ==
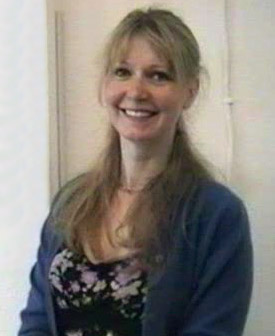
Stella Vine

=== Born in Alnwick ===
- William of Alnwick (c. 1275–1333), Franciscan theologian and Bishop of Giovinazzo
- Martin of Alnwick (d. 1336), Franciscan friar and theologian
- Henry 'Hotspur' Percy (1364?–1403), son of the 1st Earl of Northumberland
- John Busby (1765–1857), mining engineer
- William Davison (1781–1858), pharmacist, apothecary, publisher and printer
- Prideaux John Selby (1788–1867), ornithologist, botanist and artist
- William Henry Percy (1788–1855), naval commander and politician
- James Catnach (1792–1841), publisher
- George Biddell Airy (1801–1892), Astronomer Royal from 1835 to 1881
- George Tate (1805–1871), tradesman, local topographer, antiquarian and naturalist
- Thomas Turner Tate (1807–1888), mathematical and scientific educator and writer
- James Patterson (1833–1895), Australian colonial politician, premier of Victoria, born in Alnwick in 1833
- T. J. Cobden Sanderson (1840–1922), artist and bookbinder associated with the Arts and Crafts movement
- Ralph Tate (1840–1901), botanist and geologist
- Bernard Bosanquet (1848–1923), philosopher
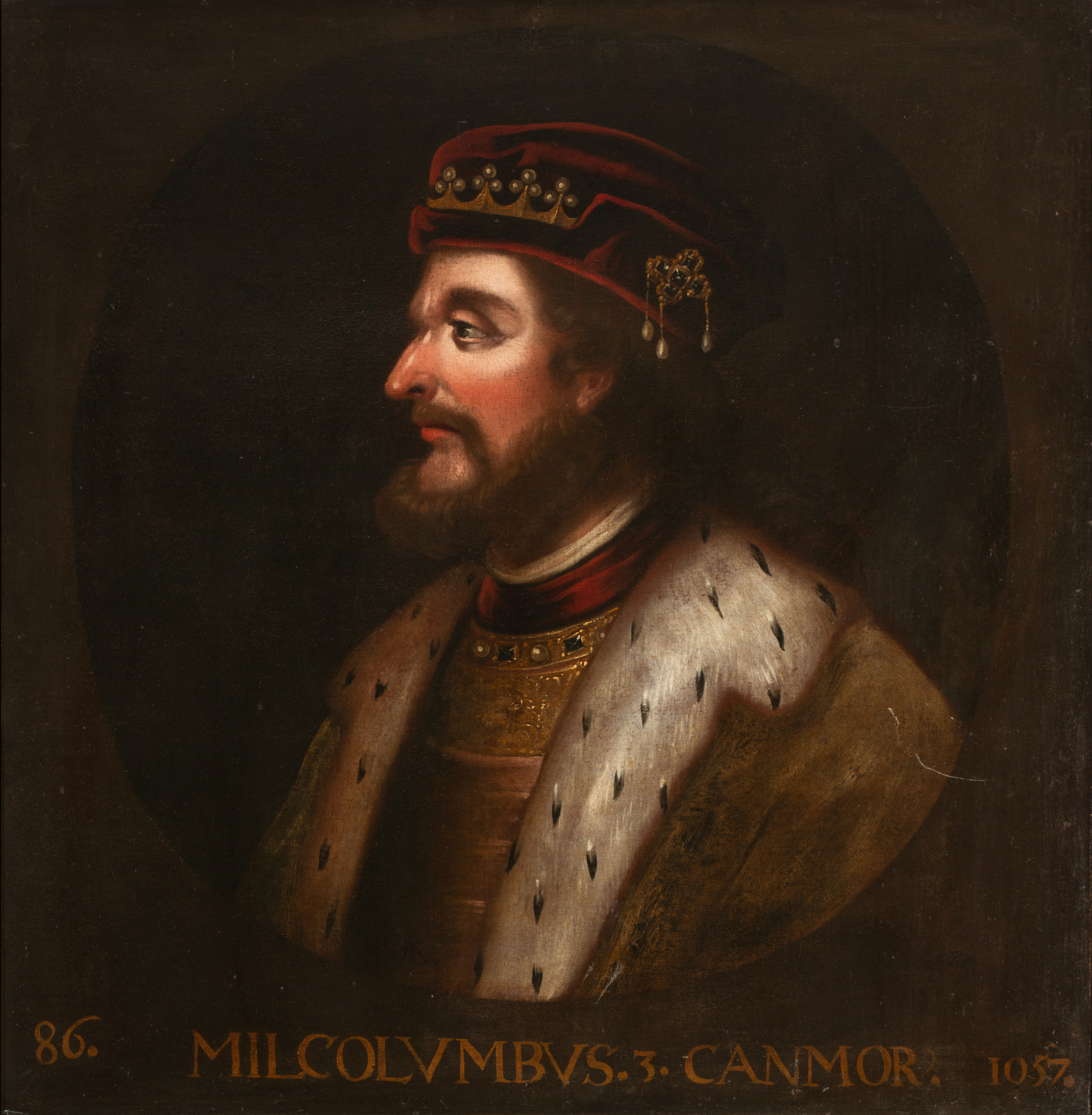
  Malcolm III of Scotland died in Alnwick in the Battle of Alnwick (1093)
- J. Arthur Reavell (1872–1973), chemical engineer
- Jim Hilton (1894–1964), painter for Shell Oil and immigrant to Canada
- David Adam (1936–2020), English minister and Canon of York Minster
- Sid Waddell (1940–2012), commentator and television personality
- Jeremy Darroch (born 1962), chief executive of Sky
- Jonny Kennedy (1966–2003), spokesperson with the skin condition epidermolysis bullosa
- Stella Vine (born 1969), artist
- Laura Weightman (born 1991), former British middle-distance runner, Olympic competitor
- Kelland Watts (born 1999), professional footballer

=== Lived in Alnwick ===
- John Scafe (1776–1843), poet.
- Lucy Bronze (born 1991), footballer for Chelsea F.C. Women and England, played junior football in Alnwick and had plaque erected in her honour at Alnwick Town FC.

=== Died in Alnwick ===
- Malcolm III of Scotland (died 1093)
- Stan Anderson (1871–1942), English international rugby union player.

== Freedom of the Town ==
The following people have received the Freedom of the Town of Alnwick:

- Bill Batey: 2019
- Adrian Ions: 12 November 2021
- William "Bill" Hugonin: 18 March 2022.
