= David Adam (priest) =

British Anglican priest (1936–2020)

David Adam (1936 – 24 January 2020) was a British Anglican priest and writer.

Adam was born in Alnwick, Northumberland. When he left school at 15, he went to work underground in the coal mines for three years before training for ordained ministry at Kelham Theological College. He was vicar of Danby-Castleton-Commondale in North Yorkshire for over 20 years, where he began writing prayers in the Celtic pattern. He later became rector of Holy Island, Lindisfarne, where he ministered to thousands of pilgrims and other visitors. He was made a canon of York Minster in 1989. He lived on the coast near Lindisfarne.

== Writings ==
Adam's first book in the Celtic vein, Edge of Glory, achieved immediate popularity. He published several collections of art, reflections, prayers and meditations based on the Celtic tradition. His books have been translated into various languages, including Finnish and German, and have appeared in American editions.

Adam's books include:

- The Cry of the Deer: Meditations on the hymn of St Patrick known as The Deer's Cry.
- A Desert in the Ocean: Meditations based on St Brendan's Prayer on the Mountain – God's call to adventurous living.
- The Eye of the Eagle: Meditations on the hymn Be Thou My Vision
- The Edge of Glory: Collection of modern prayers in the Celtic tradition
- Flame In My Heart: The life of St Aidan
- Fire of the North: The life of St Cuthbert
- On Eagles' Wings: The life of St Chad
- The Open Gate: Celtic-style prayers for spiritual growth
- The Road of Life: Reflections on Searching and Longing
- The Rhythm Of Life: Morning, Midday, Evening and Night liturgies for each day of the week, SPCK
- Tides and Seasons: A further collection of modern prayers in the Celtic tradition
- Walking the Edges: Living in the Presence of God. Drawing on the stories of St Martin of Tours, St Ninian, St Patrick, St Oswald of Northumbria and St Cuthbert, this is an invitation to journey to the "borderlands"
- The Awesome Journey: Life's pilgrimage
