= Bailiffgate Museum =

- Bailiffgate Museum shown within Northumberland grid reference NU184136
- Location: Alnwick, Northumberland, England
- Coordinates: 55.4162°N 1.7102°W
- Website: bailiffgatemuseum.co.uk

The Bailiffgate Museum is a small independent museum in Alnwick, Northumberland, England, dedicated to the history of Alnwick and North Northumberland. It is staffed by trustees and volunteers.

== Introduction ==
The museum is located in one of the oldest parts of Alnwick and is close by Alnwick Castle. It is housed in St Mary's Church, dating from 1836, with the original organ still intact. Progress through the museum tracks the rich heritage of the region through several centuries using displays, audio-visual exhibits and hands-on activities.

== Collection ==
Bailiffgate Museum's collection is specific to Alnwick and District with the majority of items in the collection relating to local social history. The collection includes agricultural objects, domestic items, railway items, coal mining artefacts, printing objects, photos, paintings. A rare 18th-century fire pump and a display about RAF Boulmer are also on show.

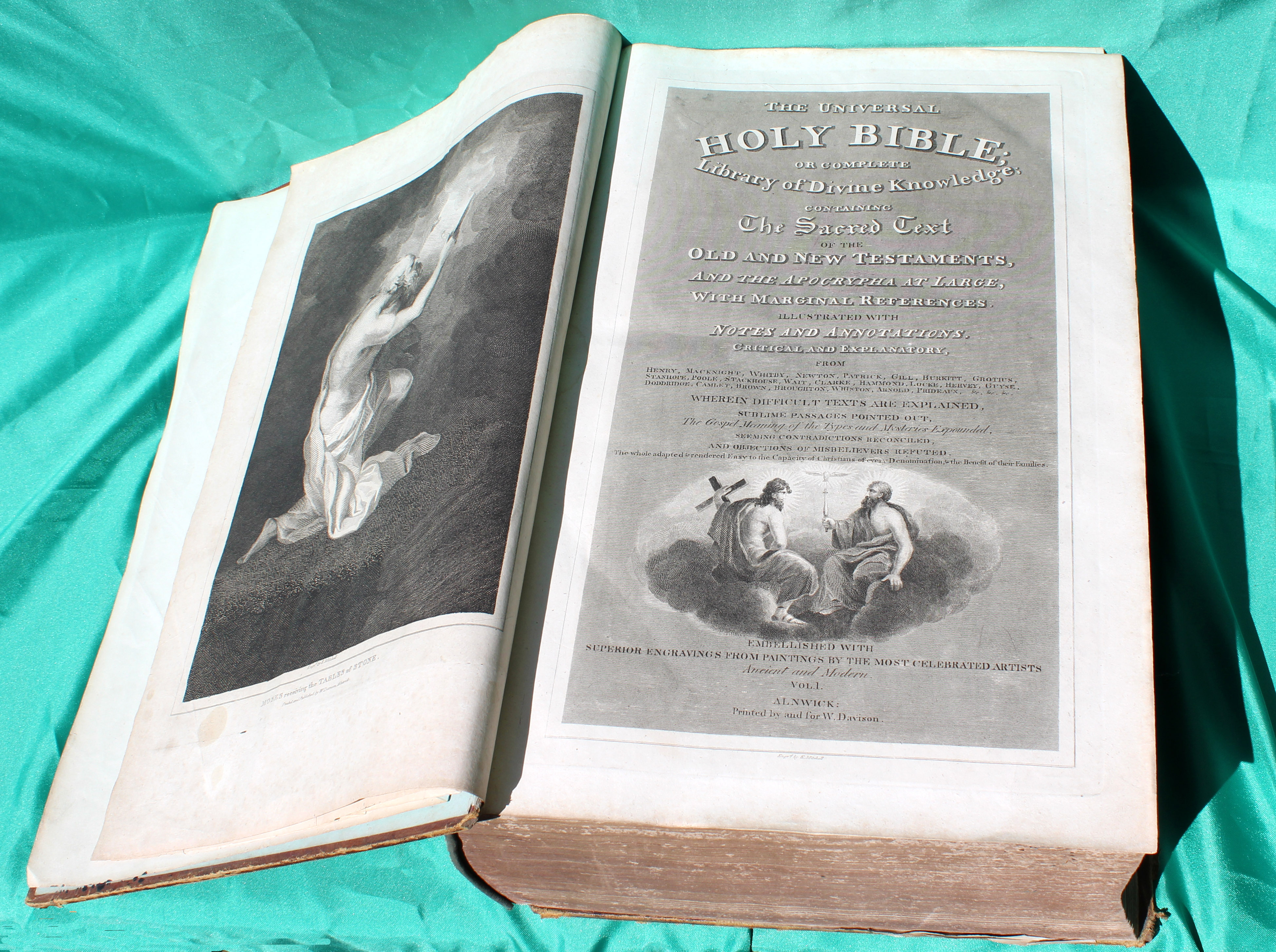
The Bible of William Davison (publisher) exhibited in the Bailiffgate Museum. One of the first fully annotated bibles to be issued as a part-work

In 2013 the museum had two of the items on display designated as "Top 100 items" by the "History of the North East in 100 Objects" project. These were:

- The Davison Bible - a bible printed by local pharmacist and progressive reformer William Davison (publisher). His desire to increase and support learning in the Christian faith led him to develop an innovative approach. Rather than solely print The Bible in its entirety, his Universal Holy Bible or Complete Library of Divine Knowledge was published in 100 parts at 1 shilling each.
- The Rothbury Football. This small leather “football”, stuffed with hay, is not much bigger than a large handball. It was used in contests between the villagers of Thropton and those of Rothbury; the respective goals were Thropton Bridge and the porch of the Parish Church at Rothbury. This is an example of an item that traces its sporting origins to the medieval period.

The Rothbury Football was again designated one of the Top 100 Objects in 2018

== Community and schools ==
The museum has links with the local community and offers activities for local schools and educational groups.

== Exhibitions ==
The museum encourages local artists and holds exhibitions of their work in a separate gallery area of the museum.

=== Stella Vine ===
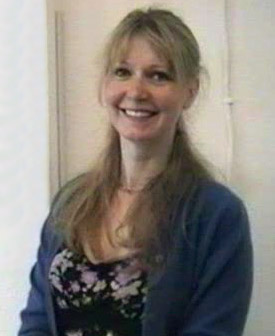
Stella Vine donated several paintings

Artist Stella Vine grew up in Alnwick, has exhibited at the Bailiffgate Museum, and donated three paintings to the collection in 2004.

Two of the paintings were autobiographical. One painting called The Rumbling Kern (2003) shows part of the Alnwick shoreline near Howick beach, whilst 27 Clayport Gardens (2004) depicts Vine in a pram as a child "outside her grandmother's old house". The third work depicts Catherine Deneuve in Belle de Jour called Belle (2004) is a painting with collage, with a ribbon and a small cut out ink jet print of a bee, stuck onto the painting.

In July 2006, Vine returned to the museum to hold a family art workshop People Pets and Places at the Bailiffgate Museum. and again with an exhibition in 2019.

Virtual Exhibition

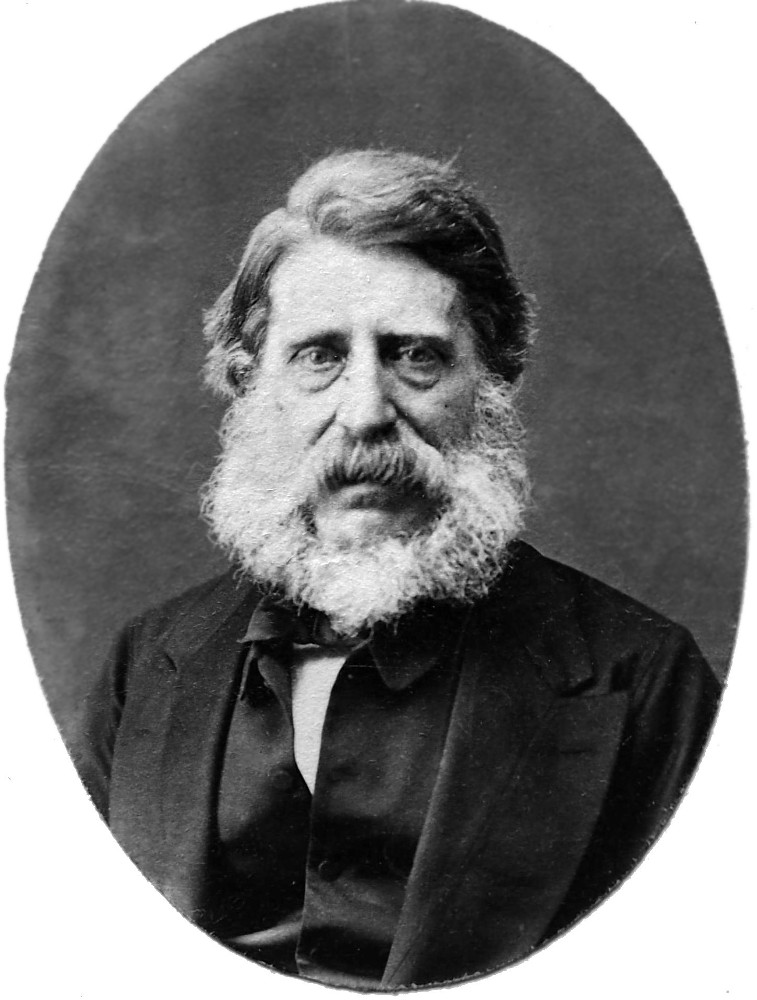
George Tate (1805-1871). A man of many talents. A draper, he also worked as Alnwick's Postmaster from 1848. He was an active member of the Alnwick Mechanics Scientific Institution and published works on topics as diverse as geology, botany, zoology and history. His most famous work was the History of the Borough, Castle and Barony of Alnwick.

The museum has set up a second website www.bailiffgatecollections.co.uk to make more of its collection available to the public than can be displayed normally. One section already available is a detailed, searchable database of all 1,300 local men who fell in WW1. Another comprises hundreds of old photographs, including some of the earliest portraits ever taken in the town.

== See also ==
- Alnwick
- Alnwick Castle
- Stella Vine (local artist who has supported the museum)
- William Davison (publisher)
