= The Northumbrian Minstrel =

Songbook published by William Davison

Northumbrian Minstrel
- Language: English, many in Geordie dialect
- Genre: chapbook
- Publisher: William Davison
- Publication date: 1811
- Publication place: United Kingdom
- Media type: Print
- Pages: 60 pages

The Northumbrian Minstrel is a songbook, giving the lyrics of local, now historical songs, printed and published at Alnwick in 1811 by William Davison. The majority of the songs are from the north of the county, and therefore the content differs from most of the other popular Northumbrian chapbooks.

== Details ==
The full title of the book is The Northumbrian Minstrel: A Choice selection of Songs. The book contains almost 60 pages and 45 song and folksong lyrics, many in Geordie dialect. The songs, from north Northumberland and southern Scotland, would have been popular, or topical, at the date of publication. There is nothing in the way of biographies of the authors or histories of the events. No music is included, only lyrics.

The book includes both anonymous or traditional lyrics and works by named authors, including a significant number by Robert Burns.

The book is included in Oliver Heslop's Bibliographical List of Works Illustrative of the Dialect of Northumberland, published in 1896 by the English Dialect Society.

== The publication ==
The front cover of the book was as thus :-

THE
Northumbrian
MINSTREL
A
CHOICE SELECTION
OF
SONGS

_____
ALNWICK
PRINTED BY W. DAVISON

1811

== Contents ==
Are as below :-

page	title	songwriter	tune	comments	Notes	Ref
5	The Northumbrian Minstrel			page heading		
5	Cottager's Daughter (The)	Mr Vint				
6	Beggar Girl (The)	Mr Sheridan				
7	Banks of Doon	R Burns				
8	Wandering Mary	not given				
9	Down-Hill of Life (The)	Mr Collins				
11	Woodlands (The)					
11	Caledonia	R Burns				
12	Wounded Hussar (The)	Mr Campbell				
14	Auld Langsyne					
15	The Days O' Langsyne					
16	Cot on the Hill (The)					
17	Parting Moments					
18	Dull Care					
18	Exile of Erin (The)	Mr Campbell				
20	Wandering Beggar (The)					
21	Lad for the Lasses (The)					
22	Black-Eyed Susan					
24	Prisoners Welcome (The)					
25	Land O' the Leal (The)	R Burns				
26	Soldier's Return (The)					
27	Thorn (The)					
27	Love and Glory					
28	From Thee, Eliza, I Must Go	Burns				
28	Beautiful Maid (The)					
29	Peck O' Maut (The)	R Burns				
30	My Nanie, O	R Burns				
31	Blue Bell of Scotland (The)					
32	A Man's A Man For A. That	R Burns				
33	Tak' Your Auld Cloak About Yer	Allan Ramsey				
35	Farewell to Ayrshire	R Burns				
36	Death of Mary (The)	Mr G Solomon				
36	Tomb of Love (The)					
37	Negro Boy					
38	Banks of the Dee (The)					
39	Plato's Advice					
40	Go, Gentle Sigh					
41	Rose Tree (The)					
41	Galley Slave (The)					
42	Way-Worn Traveller (The)					
43	When Our Country calls to Arms	Mr I Cross				
44	Mary, I Believ'd Thee True	Mr Moore				
44	Mary's Dream at Sandy's Tomb					
45	Lass of Low Degree (The)	Mr M G Lewis				
46	John Anderson, My Joe	R Burns				
48	Negro's Complaint (The)					
48	End of number first					
49	blank					
52	list of books printed for and by W Davison, Alnwick	William Davison				
56	rear outer					

== See also ==
- Geordie dialect words
