= Pembroke Street, Oxford =

Street in central Oxford, England

Coordinates: 51°45′02″N 1°15′30″W

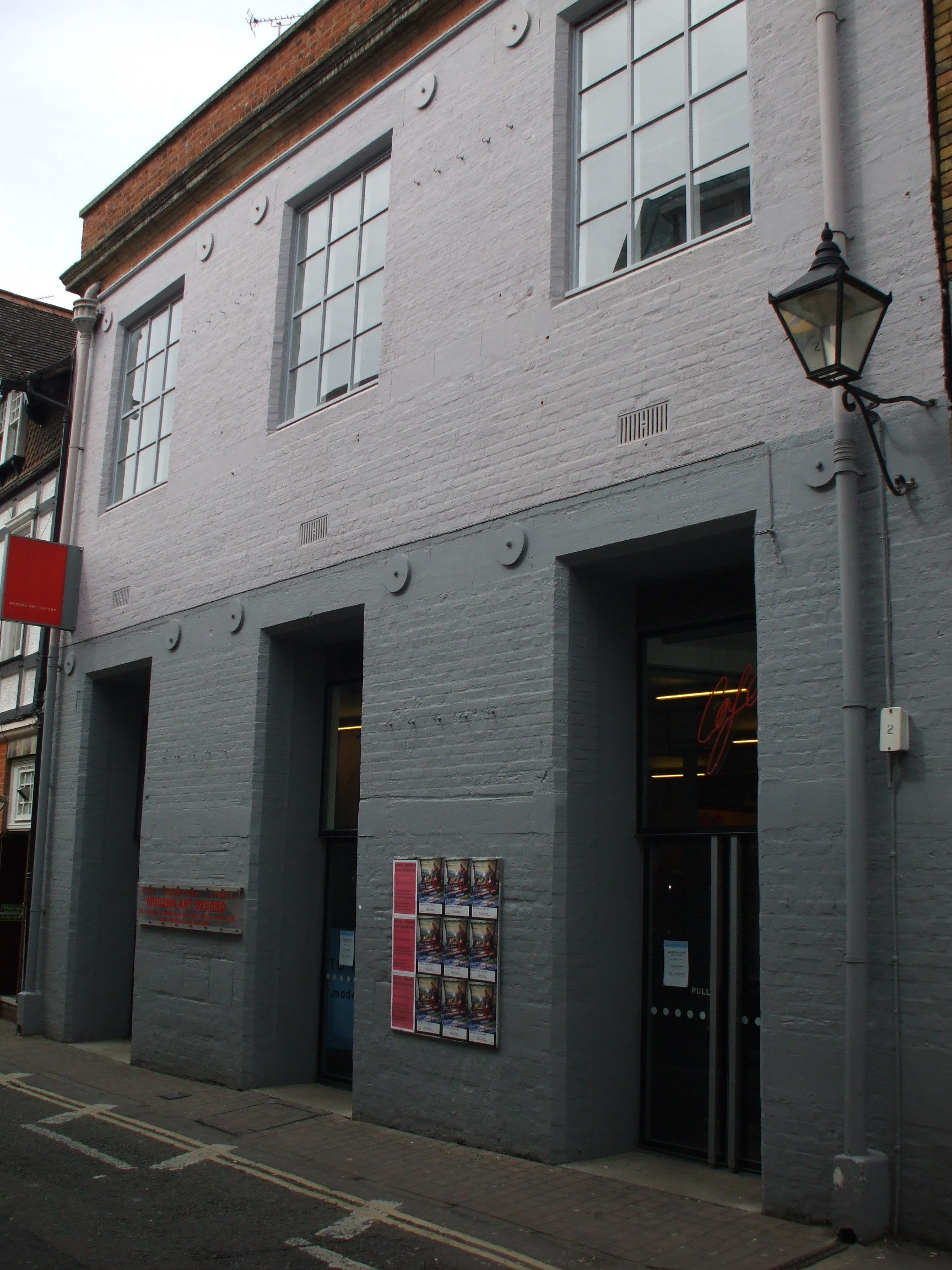
Modern Art Oxford on Pembroke Street.

Pembroke Street is a street in central Oxford, England. St Ebbes Street is to the west, and the major thoroughfare of St Aldate's is to the east.

Modern Art Oxford (formerly the Museum of Modern Art) is located on the north side of the street (No 30). Greene's Tutorial College is at 45 Pembroke Street and All Nations Language School is at No 40.

Pembroke Square and Pembroke College are close by to the south.

In November 2009, it was announced that the planned Story Museum would move to premises at Rochester House on Pembroke Street, using a gift of £2.5million from a private donor.
