= Modern Art Oxford =

Coordinates: 51.7507°N 1.2591°W

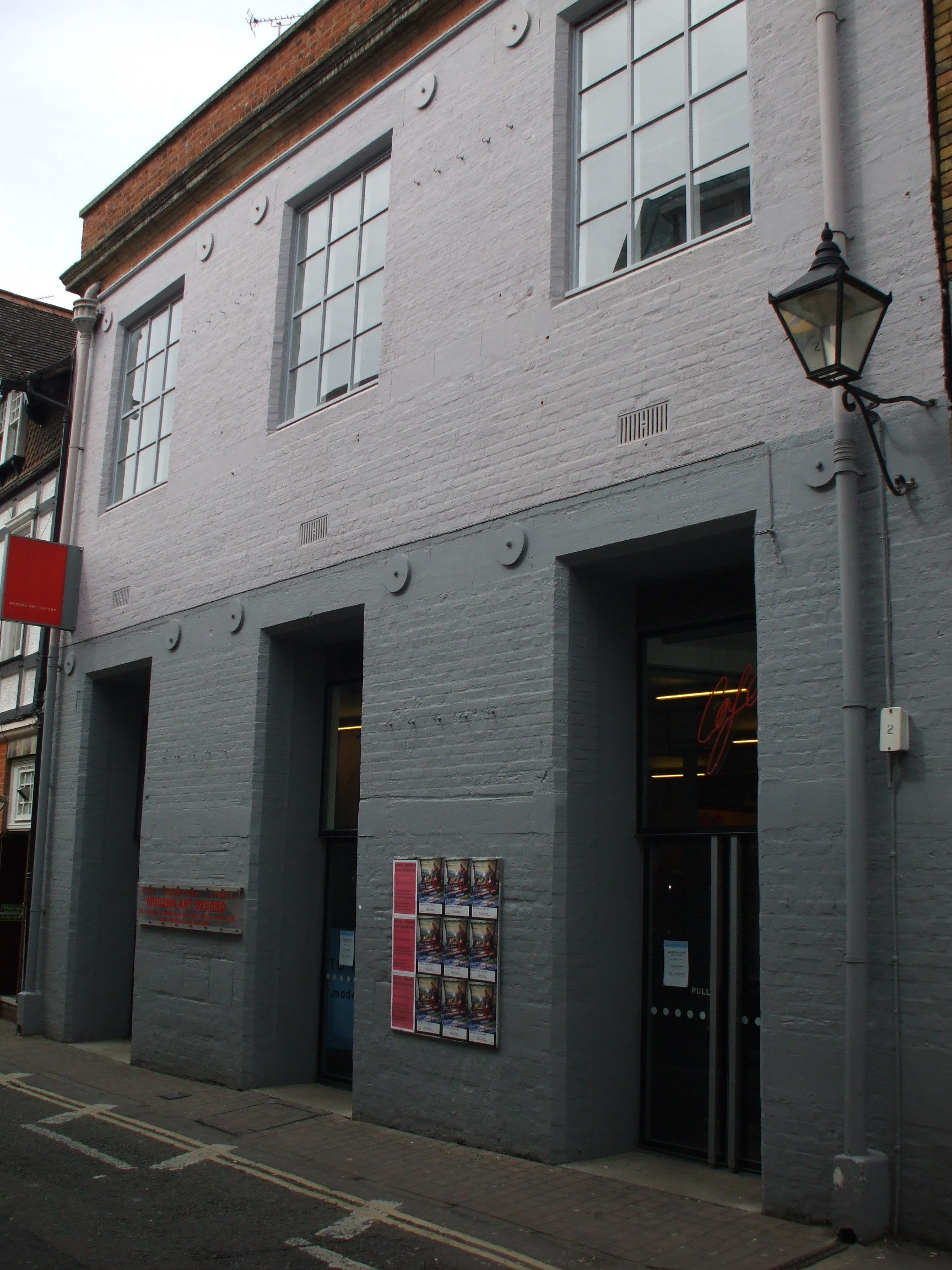
- The gallery entrance on Pembroke Street, Oxford
- Established: 1965
- Location: 30 Pembroke Street, Oxford, England
- Type: Contemporary art gallery
- Director: Paul Hobson
- Website: modernartoxford.org.uk

Modern Art Oxford is an art gallery established in 1965 in Oxford, England. From 1965 to 2002, it was called The Museum of Modern Art, Oxford.

The gallery presents exhibitions of modern and contemporary art. It has a national and international reputation for quality of exhibitions, projects and commissions, which are supported by a learning and engagement programme with audiences in excess of 100,000 each year. Funded primarily by Arts Council England, many exhibitions, events, activities and workshops are free for visitors.

== History ==
Modern Art Oxford's premises at 30 Pembroke Street, Oxford were designed by the architect Harry Drinkwater and built in 1892 as a square room and stores for Hanley's City Brewery.

The gallery was founded by architect Trevor Green in 1965. With funding from the Arts Council of Great Britain, the gallery survived as a venue for temporary exhibitions. It was widely known as MoMA Oxford, similar to other international modern art spaces such as MoMA in New York.

It was renamed "Modern Art Oxford" in 2002. Adrian Searle of The Guardian commented, "Perhaps the museum bit was only ever there to confuse tourists and convince gowny academic Oxford that modern art was worth taking seriously."

== Directorship ==
Several transitory directors oversaw the gallery until Nicholas Serota became director in 1973, with Sandy Nairne as assistant director. David Elliott replaced Serota in 1976.

Elliott's programme focused on media that were often ignored by bigger public galleries at the time, such as photography, architecture and graphic design. Under Elliott's directorship, MoMA held photography exhibitions such as the Robert Doisneau Retrospective in 1992. Elliott introduced up-and-coming artists from Africa, Asia and the Soviet Union, and at various times also held major video art exhibitions. His contributions also included multiple gallery renovations. He resigned his position in 1996 to become the director of the Moderna Museet in Stockholm, having served the longest term of any director in the history of the gallery.

Elliott's replacement, an American from Los Angeles, Kerry Brougher, preferred larger shows of American and European art, and, like Elliott, exhibitions focusing on film and media. In 2000, Brougher left to join the Hirshhorn Museum and Sculpture Garden in Washington, D.C.

Brougher was replaced by Andrew Nairne, who renamed the gallery, coordinated additional enhancements to the building, and donated the gallery's substantial library of art books and catalogues to Oxford Brookes University. He shifted the focus to exhibitions of contemporary artists, who have included Cecily Brown, Jake and Dinos Chapman, Tracey Emin, Gary Hume, Daniel Buren, Stella Vine, Sol LeWitt and Kerry James Marshall. Nairne left the gallery in 2008 to take up a senior managerial position at Arts Council England.

Michael Stanley assumed the directorship in January 2009.

David Thorp assumed interim directorship in October 2012 following the death of Michael Stanley.

Paul Hobson was appointed Director in April 2013 and took up the post that September.

== Notable exhibitions and shows ==
Artists' exhibitions have included Richard Long (1971); Sol Le Witt (1973) Joseph Beuys (1974); Donald Judd (1995); Marina Abramovic (1995, 2022–23); Carl Andre (1997), Lubaina Himid (2017), Ruth Asawa (2022), and Yoko Ono (1997). Since the renaming of the gallery, notable exhibitions have included:

- Tracey Emin This Is Another Place (November 2002 – January 2003) – marked the reopening of Modern Art Oxford by and was her first British solo exhibition since 1997. The exhibition contained drawings, etchings, film, neon works such as Fuck off and die, you slag and sculptures including a large scale wooden pier, called Knowing My Enemy.
- Jake and Dinos Chapman The Rape of Creativity (April – June 2003) – the artists bought a mint collection of 80 Goya prints and systematically defaced them. The BBC and The Daily Telegraph reviewed the show.
- Stella Vine (July – September 2007) – a solo show of by the Britart painter including more than 100 paintings and a catalogue essay by Germaine Greer.
