= Bondgate Tower =

Grade I listed building in Alnwick, Northumberland, England

- Interactive map of Bondgate Tower
- 55°24′45″N 01°42′13″W

History
- Built: 1450

Site notes
- Architect: Henry Percy, 2nd Earl of Northumberland

Listed Building – Grade I
- Official name: The Hotspur Gateway or Bondgate Tower
- Designated: 20 February 1952
- Reference no.: 1041513

Scheduled monument
- Official name: Bondgate Tower
- Reference no.: 1006597

Statue of Sir Henry Percy, commonly known as Harry Hotspur, next to the junction of Pottergate and Narrowgate (B6341). Bondgate Tower is commonly called other names after him such as Hotspur Tower or Hotspur Gateway

Bondgate Tower also known as the Hotspur Tower or the Hotspur Gateway in reference to Sir Henry Percy (commonly known as Harry Hotspur), son of the 1st Earl of Northumberland and father of the 2nd Earl of Northumberland. Although commonly called a tower it is actually a gatehouse. It has three storeys constructed of stone and consists of a recessed archway flanked by two polygonal towers. It is located in Alnwick, Northumberland in the United Kingdom. The gatehouse straddles Bondgate (the B6346), the main road of Alnwick. Low traffic can pass through its entrance while tall vehicles must take diversions to get past. A licence was granted in 1434 by Henry V to Henry Percy 2nd Earl of Northumberland to wall the town and add battlements. These took fifty years to complete, with Bondgate Tower being finished around 1450.

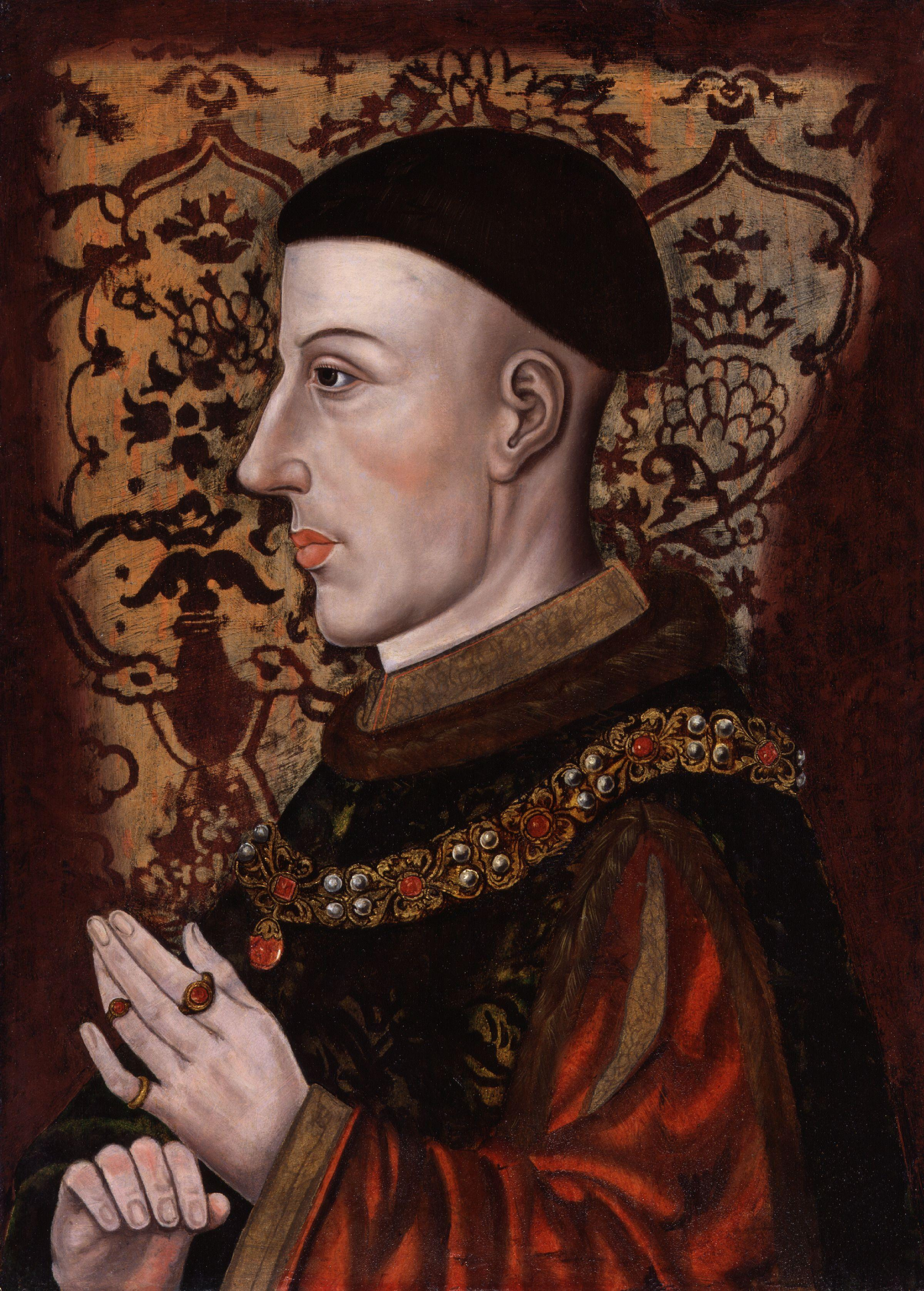
King Henry V granted a licence to Henry Percy, 2nd Earl of Northumberland to build Bondgate Tower

== Gallery ==
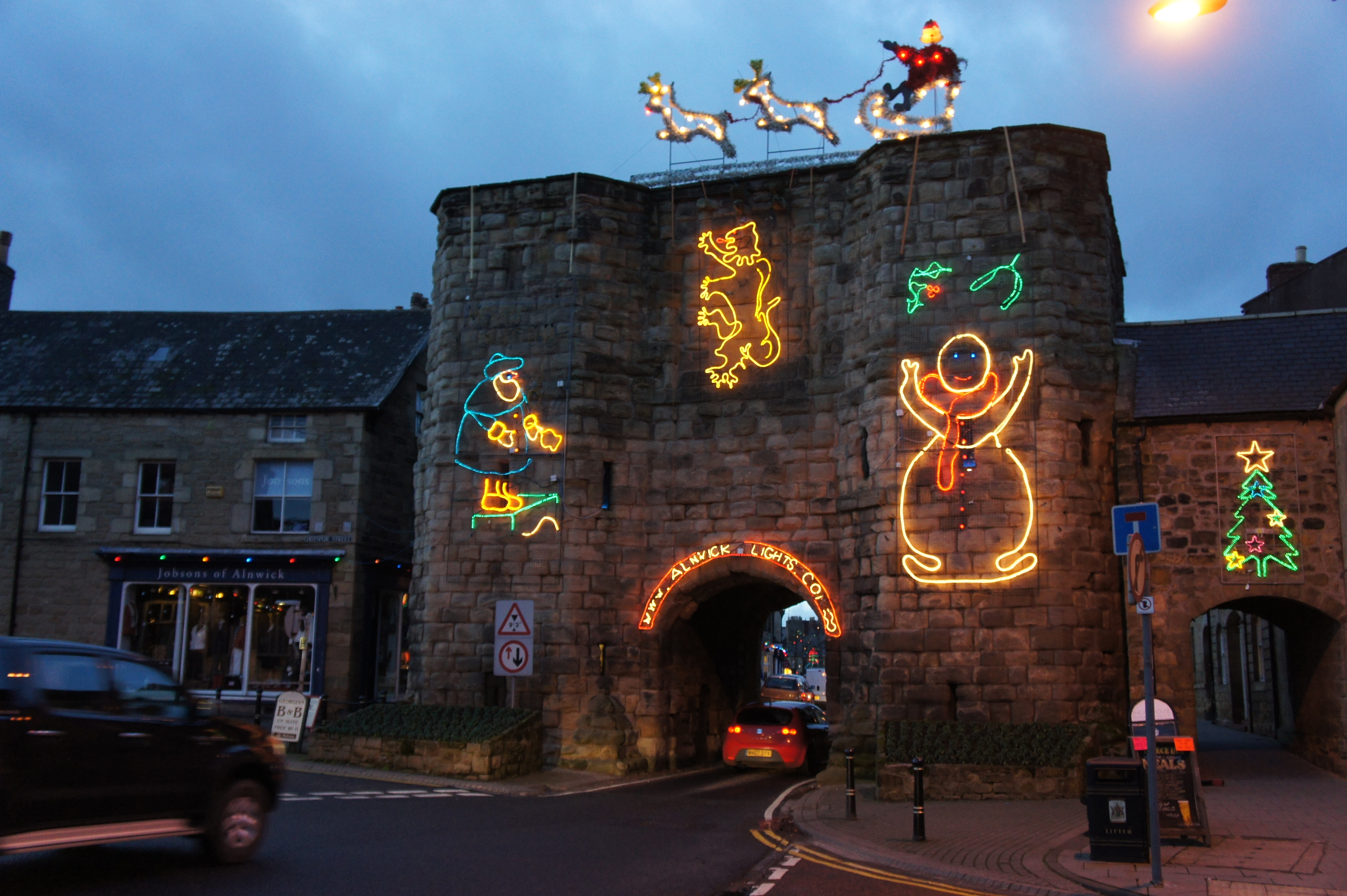
Bondgate Tower decorated with Christmas lights in December 2012

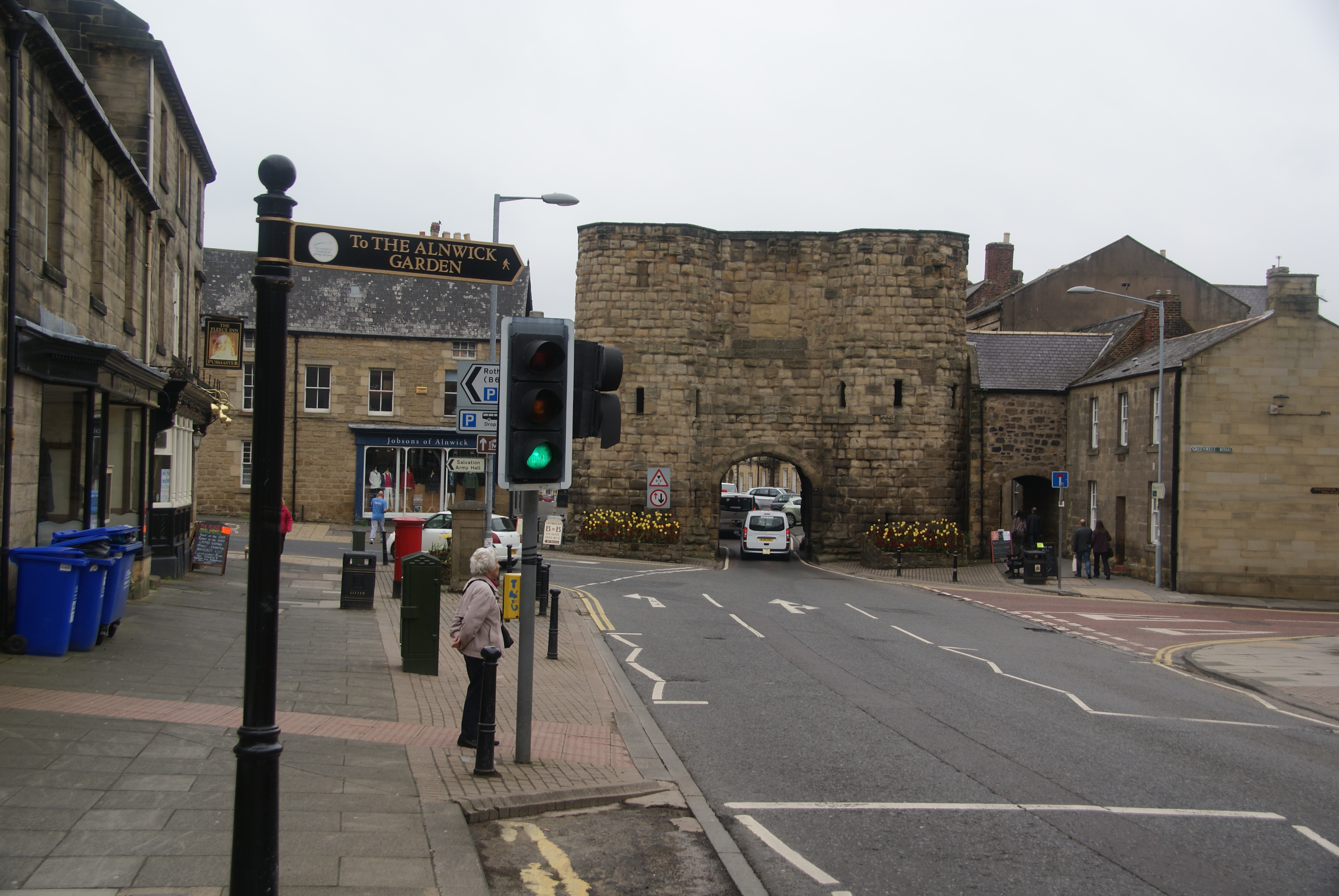
May 2013
