= William Davison (publisher) =

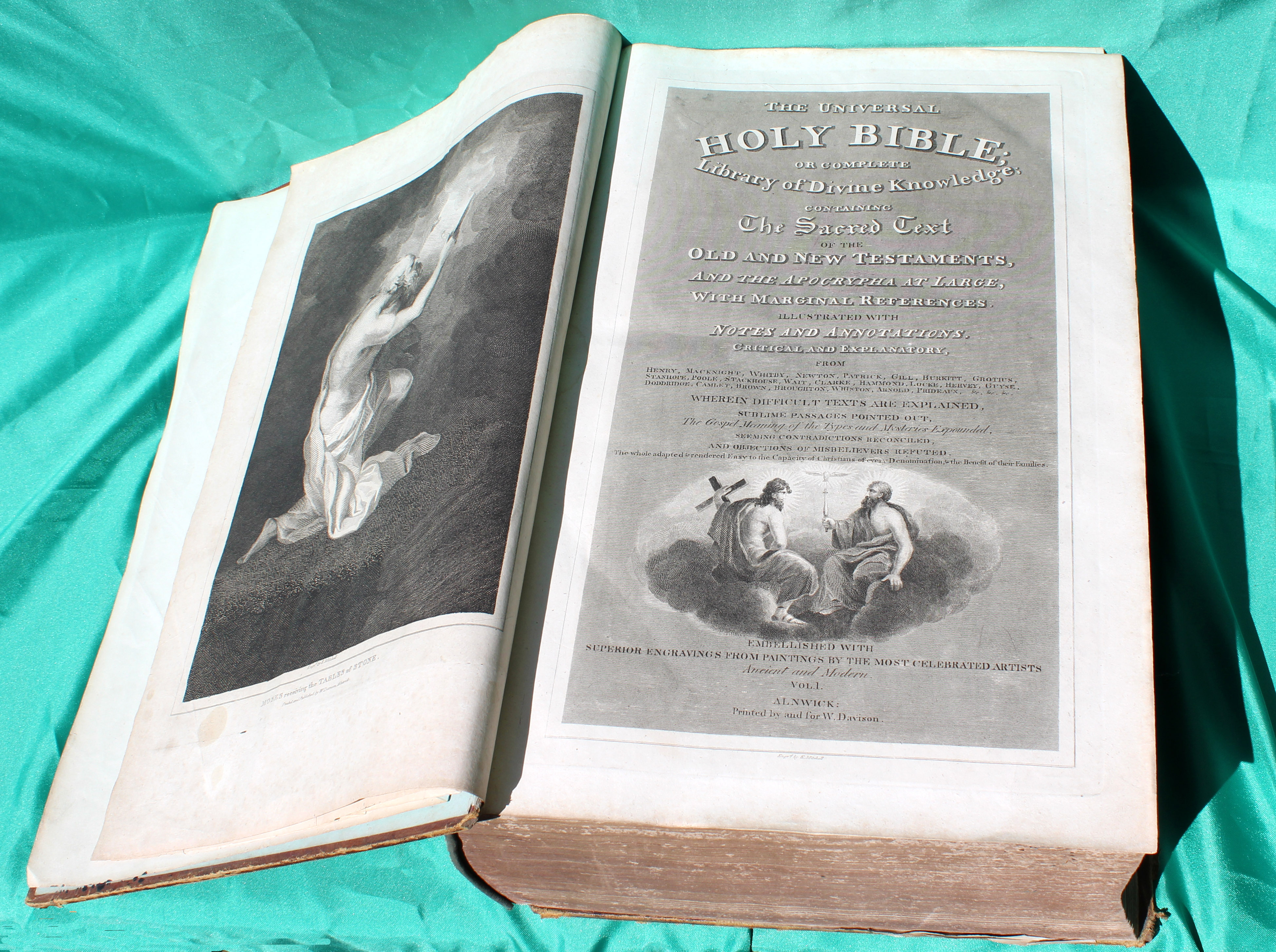
A Davison Bible exhibited in the Bailiffgate Museum. One of the first fully annotated bibles to be issued as a part-work

William Davison (1781–1858) was born in Alnwick. He was a pharmacist, apothecary, printer, engraver/etcher, bookseller, stationer, publisher, bookbinder, librarian/owner of a circulating library, and stereotyper/stereotype founder. His main employment became printing/publishing but he was always dedicated to social reform through education.

== Early life ==
William Davison was born in Alnwick on 16 November 1781, the younger son of William (senior) and Mary. William was educated in Alnwick, and was apprenticed at the age of fourteen to Mr. Hind, a chemist in Ponteland, Newcastle. He returned to Alnwick in 1802 to set up business as a pharmacist, and in 1803 was for a short time in partnership with a printer (Joseph Perry).

Wishing to enlarge his business, William placed an advert in the "Newcastle Courant" in 1804 indicating that his pharmacy now stocked books, paper, drawing materials and musical instruments in addition to ointments and other medical supplies.

William was a very active and successful pharmacist and apothecary, and only entered into the world of printing accidentally, although he is probably best known for his printing, He actually came into printing at an opportune time, as there had only been five successful printers in Alnwick previously.

He went into partnership with John Catnach. Catnach had only recently formed a new business after his original venture had gone into bankruptcy. The partnership between Davison and John Cannich ran under the name of Davison & Catnach from 1807 to 1808, Davison's role appeared to be primarily that of financier whilst Catnach provided the contacts and technical expertise. The arrangement did not work out as intended for either of the parties, and in less than two years it was dissolved, leaving Davison publishing under his own account. But their edition of "The Poetic Works of Robert Burns" enjoyed such financial success as to warrant Davison issuing his new edition shortly after they parted.

Early in his life as a printer, he started to use stereotyping, which was then not used generally. He also employed Thomas Bewick to illustrate his books and publications.

In 1814, Davison opened a small foundry at his works in Bondgate Street, Alnwick, at which he produced the metal stereotypes. He also printed a trade catalogue that contains over a thousand impressions of wood-engravings, metal ornaments, ornamental borders and similar items.

Davison worked very hard and was extremely innovative, publishing and printing his own products which included the broadsheets, small chapbooks, larger chapbooks, pamphlets, children's books, school books, guidebooks, history books, commercial billheads, and advertising flyers. Between around 1812 and 1817, he published a set of an estimated 50 caricatures that measured approximately 233 mm by 133 mm or 9.5 in. by 5.5 in. single sheets with a topical subject shown in the new, popular caricature style at the time.

Davison failed in his attempt to produce a comprehensive history of the region, but his most significant works were probably his "splendid" (ref Isaac) Book of Common Prayer and his innovative folio Bible with copious commentaries originally sold in 100 parts at one shilling each. Although it was a financial disaster, the latter has been recognized as an innovative approach to supporting learning in the Christian faith. The copy of the Davison Bible on display at Bailiffgate Museum was hence designated as one of the Top 100 Objects in the NE of England in an initiative supported by Arts Council England in 2013.

== Family ==
William Davison' father, also William (the elder), was a religious dissenter who lived in Alnwick with his second wife, Mary, the mother of at least one child. The parish records described William the elder as husbandman, gardener and farmer. William's own son, also named William, trained under him in the medical school set up in his pharmacy to become a doctor.

== Later life and progressive principles ==
Hindley describes Davison as " ..what is now termed a Liberal, he had strong leanings to what was then known as the Progressive School."

Despite his own father having been a religious dissenter, William Davison himself was a churchwarden. He was on the committee responsible for the provision of a workhouse to accommodate the poor of Alnwick in 1810.

Around 1815 the "Alnwick Dispensary" was founded "for the prompt and judicious aid of medicines and medical advice" (Isaac), and where Davison acted as apothecary. He was a subscriber to both the dispensary and the Alnwick Scientific and Mechanical Institution which had been founded in 1824. The medical school he set up in his pharmacy premises was noted throughout the North of England.

Davison was also a pioneer in bringing gas to Alnwick. This process began in 1817 but initially does not seem to have been very successful. However, in 1825, Davison, along with another eight men of the town began with a new works in Canongate which continued to produce gas until 1882 when production was moved to another site in Alnwick.

When Infant Schools became established in England in the 1830s pioneered by reformers such as Samuel Wilderspin, Davison was a major supplier nationally of educational "chap" books; primers for new readers or illustrated short stories designed to stimulate young minds. On a sheet of foolscap paper eight panels of vignettes and text would be printed, then another eight on the reverse. Cut and folded they produced a child-size 16 page book which was cheap to produce and hence accessible to the masses.

Although he produced a number of school textbooks, his most successful was his edition of Charles Hutton's Complete Treatise on Practical Arithmentic and Book-Keeping (1828)

In 1854, at the age of 72 William Davison established the “Alnwick Mercury” . The first edition had a print run of just 1000 and cost one old Old Penny each. The paper was a success, remarkably so as the between 1827 and 1852 no less than 4 newspapers had been introduced and had failed, possibly due to the population being relatively small and in addition spread over a large area.

William Davison's died in 1858. His son William took over the running of the business. And about a year later he sold the newspaper title, which changed to the "Alnwick and County Gazette" in 1883, by which time the circulation was several thousands. The paper is now published weekly as the "Northumberland Gazette"

== Works ==
=== Books and pamphlets ===
==== Written by Davison ====
- Facsimile of the cover of first issue of the "Alnwick Mercury, Northumberland Advertiser, and Entertaining Miscellany"
- A descriptive and historical view of Alnwick, the County Town of Northumberland, and of Alnwick Castle, Alwick & Hulne Abbeys, Brislee Tower, The Borough of Alnwick, Etc.. 1822
- The Northumbrian Minstrel – 1811

==== Printed and produced by Davison ====
- Prospectus for the History of Alnwick (Second edition) – requesting anyone with any information to contact the publisher – of 4 pages – 1822
- Prospectus for a Prayer Book: "In the Press, and speedily will be published Price 6d – requesting suggestions for inclusion – 1817
- Tynemouth Priory – 2 leaves folded to 235x189mm, carrying a small wood-engraved view of Tynemouth Priory c1840
- The Poetic Works of Robert Burns – 270 pages – 1808
- Prospectus for "The History of Northumberland – 8 pages – 1820
- Metrical Legends of Northumberland: containing the traditions of Dunstanborough Castle, and other poetical romances
- A History of the Earth and Animated Nature by M. de Buffon, Goldsmith, and others
- The Heart of Mid-Lothian – 12 pages – cost 1 penny
- Day, a Pastoral in Three Parts, viz, Morning, Noon, and Evening to which is added "The Stubborn Dame" – 36 pages
- A natural history of reptiles, serpents and insects – 36 pages
- Poetical Works – numerous editions and volumes between 1812 and c1817
- Poems and Songs c1828
- Poems, chiefly in the Scottish Dialect both humorous And entertaining. By Thomas Donaldson, weaver, Glanton" – 1809
- The Works of Thomas Adams, Warkworth including The Battle of Trafalgar
- The Works of Alex. Pope, Esq., in eight volumes at 24/-
- The Caledonian Musical Repository, embellished with engravings, price 4/6
- A series of seven small Natural History Books – 1814
- Several small volumes on Natural History – 1810
- Blair's Grave – c1810
- Goldsmith's Poetical Works in 2 small volumes – 1812
- The Poetical Works of Robert Fergusson – 1812 or 1813
- The History of Crazy Jane. By Sarah Wilkinson – 1812
- Poems in the Cumberland Dialect by Robert Anderson
- The Repository of Select Literature, being an Elegant Assemblage of Curious, Scarce, Entertaining and Instructive Pieces in Prose and Verse. Adorned with beautiful Engravings by Bewick.

=== Caricatures possibly engraved by Davison ===
- Caricature No.1 – Countryman in London – a Single sheet, image 133x222 on paper 187x258mm – Printed in black
- Caricature No.2 – Let us all be Unhappy Together – a Single sheet, image 133x222 on paper 187x258mm – Printed in black
- Caricature No.3 – The Politician – a Single sheet, image 134x221 on paper 185x261mm – Printed in black
- Caricature No.4 – The Old Maids' Petition – a Single sheet, image 133x222 on paper 187x258mm – Printed in black
- Caricature No.5 – Jew purchasing old Clothes
- Caricature No.6 – unknown
- Caricature No.7 – unknown
- Caricature No.8 – Hob and Stage Doctor – a Single sheet, image 136x224 on paper 189x262mm – Printed in black
- Caricature No.9 – unknown
- Caricature No.10 – Curate going on Duty – a Single sheet, image 138x221 on paper 192x266mm – Printed in black
- Caricature No.11 – Vicar Returning from Duty – a Single sheet, image 138x221 on paper 192x266mm – Printed in black
- Caricature No.12 – London Sportsmen (Shooting Flying (birds ???))
- Caricature No.13 – London Sportsmen Marking Game
- Caricature No.14 – London Sportsmen Recharging
- Caricature No.15 – London sportsmen finding a hare
- Caricature No.16 – The Gout – a Single sheet, image 133x222 on paper 187x258mm – Printed in black
- Caricature No.17 – The Frenchmen in Billingsgate – a Single sheet, image 133x222 on paper 187x258mm – Printed in black
- Caricature No.18 – Yawning is Catching – a Single sheet, image 133x220 on paper 187x265mm – Printed in black
- Caricature No.19 – The Misfortune – a Single sheet, image 133x222 on paper 187x258mm – Printed in black
- Caricature No.20 – Spaniard Lousing – a Single sheet, image 208x137 on paper 265x186mm – Printed in black
- Caricature No.21 – Ax About – a Single sheet, image 198x148 on paper 247x192mm – Printed in sepia
- Caricature No.22 – Snuff and Twopenny – a Single sheet, image 195x146 on paper 258x185mm – Printed in black
- Caricature No.23 – unknown
- Caricature No.24 – The Hermit – a Single sheet, image 215x141 on paper 263x187mm – Printed in black
- Caricature No.25 – Me and My Wife and Daughter – a Single sheet, image 135x221 on paper 183x263mm – Printed in black
- Caricature No.26 – How to do Things by Halves
- Caricature No.27 – The Blessing – a Single sheet, image 133x222 on paper 187x258mm – Printed in sepia
- Caricature No.28 – Druid and Highlander
- Caricature No.29 – Columbus breaking the Egg
- Caricature No.30 – unknown
- Caricature No.31 – Country Sport – a Single sheet, image 133x222 on paper 187x258mm – Printed in black
- Caricature No.32 – The Distressed (or Distrest) Poet – a Single sheet, image 133x222 on paper 187x258mm – Printed in black
- Caricature No.33 – unknown
- Caricature No.34 – unknown
- Caricature No.35 – The Country Crier – a Single sheet, image 129x223 on paper 190x265mm – Printed in black
- Caricature No.44 – Economy – a Single sheet, image 133x222 on paper 187x258mm – Printed in black
- Caricature No.?? – Out of Place and Unpension'd
- Caricature No.?? – Slight of Hand by a Monkey or the Lady's Head Unloaded
- Caricature No.?? – The country tooth drawer
- Caricature No.?? – Let us all be unhappy together
- Caricature No.?? – Idleness
- Caricature No.?? – Untitled
- Caricature No.?? – Laplanders, English, Americans, Africans, Chinese and Hottentots
- Caricature No.?? – Out of Place and Unpension'd
- All the above were produced between 1812 and 1817

== See also ==
- Bailiffgate Museum
- Davison's The Northumbrian Minstrel, 1811
- Geordie dialect words
- John Catnach
