= Cathy Lomax =

English painter

- Born: 1963 (age 62–63); Croydon, London, England
- Education: Central Saint Martins
- Known for: Painting
- Style: Figurative art

Fetish Girl by Cathy Lomax 2003 (based on Thora Birch as Enid in the United Artists film Ghost World)

Cathy Lomax (born 1963) is a London based artist, curator and director of Transition Gallery. She is mainly known for her figurative paintings which often focus on the construction, codification and subversion of femininity and are inspired by 'the seductive imagery of film, fame and fashion'.

== Life and career ==
Cathy Lomax grew up in Guildford, Surrey where she was co-founder of the New Wave group Shoot! Dispute. She moved to London in 1983 and worked as a makeup artist with photographers such as Juergen Teller, Craig McDean and Corinne Day for I-D, The Face and Vogue. She earned a Bachelor of Arts in Fine Art from London Guildhall University (2000), and a Master of Arts from Central Saint Martins College of Art and Design (2002). In 2016 she began a PhD in Film Studies at Queen Mary University of London. Her research looks at makeup and its role in shaping female Hollywood stars.

Lomax is the director of Transition Gallery in East London and also publishes and edits two magazines: Arty, a publication featuring artwork and opinions from a group of invited contributors; and Garageland, an art and culture publication which examines art themes such as beauty, machismo or nature.

Artist Stella Vine has commented on Lomax:

It's been great to have the support of Cathy Lomax at Transition Gallery, she has been one of the few people to really believe in me ... she'd say, “great do it, just do it all, you shouldn't censor yourself so much, stop chucking stuff out !” Nice genuine support without any motive. Cathy paints a bit like Peter Blake. I first came across Cathy's magazine ‘Arty’ a little art fanzine at the Serpentine gallery bookshop ... the energy in her magazine, and the childishness of it, I thought she would be a teenager, she was my age...and she also was running her own gallery ... She's been a rock...

In 2014 Lomax received an Abbey Award and became an Abbey Painting Fellow at the British School at Rome. She showed work made during this time at the June 2014 Mostra. In 2016 Lomax won the inaugural 'Contemporary British Painting Prize' for her painting "Black Venus". The prize included a solo exhibition at Swindon Museum and Art Gallery, the subsequent show 'The Blind Spot' was reviewed by Matt Price in The Anomie Review of Contemporary British Painting, and Adors, a painting inspired by the Swindon born actress Diana Dors was acquired for the gallery's collection. The second part of a prize was a commissioned essay which was written by academic Paul O'Kane and published in The Journal of Visual Art Practice

Much of Lomax's art is connected to images from film and she has produced cover artwork for three BFI Film Classic books, including Picnic at Hanging Rock by Anna Backman Rogers and Mädchen in Uniform by Barbara Mennel. In a 2024 article for Filmmaker magazine Holly Willis wrote:

'In Cathy's drawings and paintings, we see cinema and its voracious gaze at the female rendered through the loving gaze of another female. The result is not a doubling of a kind of looking that takes away, but a revisioning of looking that gives back. This is looking that actually sees, that acknowledges, celebrates and reclaims.'

Published writing includes: 'Ghostly threads: Painting Marilyn Monroe's white dresses', Film, Fashion & Consumption, 2015, 'Makeup as Dark Magic: The Love Witch and the Subversive Female Gaze', Frames Cinema Journal (2019), 'Kirsten Glass: Swimming Witches', Karsten Schubert London catalogue essay (2020), 'Girlfriends' a review of the Criterion Collection Blu-Ray, Open Screens Journal (2022) Her book 'Making Up the Star: Makeup, Femininity, Race and Ageing' will be published by BFI/Bloomsbury in 2026.

== Shows ==
Exhibitions include:

- Scandal '63 Revisited (Leicester Gallery at De Montfort University, April 2023)
- Fabulation (All Saints Church, Cambridge, March 2022)
- Star Bar (Broadway Cinema, Letchworth Garden City, 2020)
- The Immaculate Dream (Collyer Bristol Galley, London, 2019)
- Beauty Salon (Alison Richards Building, University of Cambridge)
- The Blind Spot (Swindon Museum and Art Gallery, 2017)
- American Tan (Dolph, London, 2015)
- The Image Duplicator (Contemporary Art Projects, London, 2009)
- The Golden Record (Collective Gallery, Edinburgh, 2008)
- Vignettes (Rosy Wilde, 2006)
- She's No Angel (James Coleman, 2004)
- Girl on Girl (Transition Gallery, 2003)

== See also ==
- Alex Michon
- Stella Vine
- Nadia Hebson
- The Priseman Seabrook Collection

== Books ==
- The Anomie Review of Contemporary British Painting, Anomie, ISBN 978-1-910221-16-7
- Grant, Catherine (2019). Fandom as Methodology: A Sourcebook for Artists and Writers. MIT Press. ISBN 9781912685134.
- Arty: Greatest Hits, Transition Editions, ISBN 0-9548954-1-X (an anthology of excerpts from issues 1–16)
