= Stella Vine =

English artist

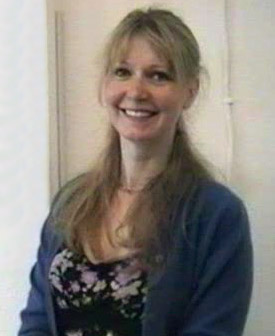
- Stella Vine in 2001
- Born: Melissa Jane Robson; 1969 (age 56–57); Alnwick, Northumberland, England
- Education: Academy of Live and Recorded Arts
- Known for: Painting

Stella Vine (born Melissa Jane Robson, 1969) is an English artist, who lives and works in London. Her work is figurative painting, with subjects drawn from personal life, as well as from rock stars, royalty, and other celebrities.

In 2001, she was exhibited by the Stuckists group, which she joined for a short time; she was married briefly to the group co-founder, Charles Thomson.

In 2003, she opened her own gallery Rosy Wilde in East London. In 2004, Charles Saatchi bought Hi Paul can you come over I'm really frightened (2003), a painting of Diana, Princess of Wales, which provoked media controversy, as did a subsequent purchase of a painting of drug victim Rachel Whitear.

Later work has featured Kate Moss as a subject, as in Holy water cannot help you now (2005). In 2006, she re-opened her gallery in Soho, London.

The first major show of her work was held in 2007 at Modern Art Oxford. In the same year, Vine designed clothing for Topshop.

== Early life ==
Stella Vine was born Melissa Jane Robson in Alnwick, Northumberland, England in 1969. She changed her name to "Stella Vine" in 1995, inspired by Andy Warhol. Vine lived with her mother, a seamstress, and her grandmother, a secretary. Her mother remarried when she was seven, and they relocated to Norwich. Vine said she was "making things and performing music and plays, as far back as I can remember." When she was a child, she used to make water colours in the library, painting Queen Victoria, and copying the Pre-Raphaelites and Greek Mythology.

Prompted by a difficult relationship with her stepfather, Vine left home at 13 and lived in the Argyle Street, Norwich squat before being briefly fostered in Brixton, London. Vine then moved back to Norwich and began to teach herself in the Norwich Reference Library. Vine's first job was at age 14 in a local Norwich cake shop. During this time, she entered a relationship with a 24-year-old caretaker, and, at the age of 17, gave birth to a son, Jamie. Vine moved into a home for single parents and then relocated to London, where Vine joined the National Youth Theatre of Britain in 1983, and the Academy of Live and Recorded Arts in 1987.

Vine lived with musician Ross Newell, "the love of her life" for over four years, but "stupidly" left him for another relationship; two years later she wanted to restart the relationship with Newell, but he no longer trusted her. In 2004, by which time Newell was settled in a marriage with children, Vine said that he was still her "soul mate". Describing how she decided to become an artist and what inspired her, Vine said a "wonderful ex-boyfriend" called Ross had always told her she should become a painter, and that she had always made "crazy doodles".

== Career ==
=== Early work ===
For five years Vine performed as an actress, touring provincial theatres around the United Kingdom, as well as running her own improvised theatre company, Minx Productions, and playing with her band, Victoria Falls. Vine said it was difficult to tour with a small child but earned her Equity Card by performing with Durham Theatre Company. Amongst other roles, she played Barclay in Joe Orton's What The Butler Saw at Theatre Clwyd, The National Theatre of Wales: she was a fan of Orton, whom she discovered at drama school. Vine said she would wake up early and dance to songs by PJ Harvey before improvising around her character to prepare for each day's rehearsals. Vine remembers seeing "wonderful paintings by Gainsborough" whilst rehearsing at Kenwood House, London. In the late 1980s, Vine met the film director Mike Leigh. After seeing Leigh's film Meantime (1983), it became her ambition to direct and act in improvised films. When Vine was in her early twenties she auditioned for him twice.

In 1995, she abandoned her ambitions to be an actress and became a hostess in a Mayfair club, where most of the activity was talking, often to elderly men, and "Any negotiation for sexual favours, or your time, or conversation, was very old-fashioned. Very English". Using the name "Stella Vine", she became a lap dancer. She worked as a stripper at Miranda's and later at the Windmill Club in Soho to pay the rent, whilst living with her son in bedsits. One man she met, whom she described as a "sugar daddy" and with whom she was still in contact in 2007, looked after her for six years, and in 1998 took her to New York, where he introduced her to the Frick Collection. She recalled in 2007 that "the candy coloured" room of Gainsborough proved such a rush of excitement that she had to sit down. Januszczak said that this was the moment Vine "realised how much prettiness was possible in art".

=== Painting ===
Vine's paintings are the most well documented part of her artistic output. She paints in both oil and acrylic with "trademark drips of paint falling from the lips and chin" of her subjects. The themes of Vine's painting focus on memory, nostalgia and fairy tales. Vine frequently draws inspiration from her private life, painting from photographs and her memory. The theme of autobiography first surfaced in Vine's early paintings, created whilst she studied at Hampstead School of Art in the early 2000s. Vine painted her step father, with whom she had a troubled, abusive relationship.

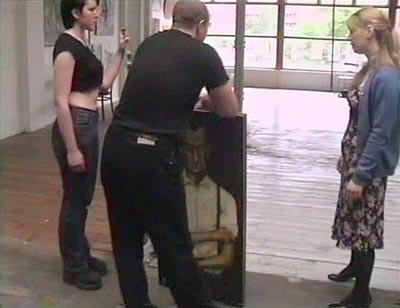
Stella Vine (right) with Charlotte Gavin (left) and Joe Machine at the Vote Stuckist show in 2001.

Vine developed a "crush" on artist Billy Childish, and attended his music events; in June 2000, she went to a talk given by him and fellow Stuckist co-founder, Charles Thomson, on Stuckism. She met Thomson on 30 May 2001 at the Vote Stuckist show in Brixton, where she exhibited some of her paintings publicly for the first time in the show and formed The Westminster Stuckists group. On 4 June, she took part in a Stuckist demonstration. On 10 July, she renamed her group The Unstuckists. In October, there was a Vine painting in the first Stuckist show in Paris.

She had a two-month relationship with Thomson and they married on 8 August 2001 in New York. Two days later they had an intense row; she left him and they did not meet again till a week later in London. They split up after about two months, and were divorced in October 2003.

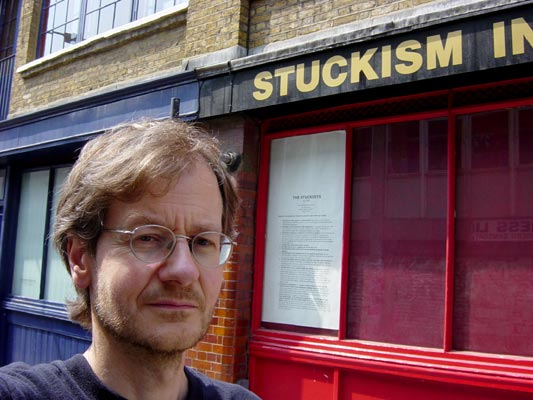
Vine's marriage to Charles Thomson in 2001 lasted two months.

In March 2004, Vine claimed to have married him because this had been a condition of his paying off her debts of £20,000. Thomson said that this had been part of a business arrangement to promote themselves as an art couple, and that there had been no condition of marriage.

In October 2006, The Stuckist group show, Go West, at Spectrum London gallery, included two paintings by Thomson, which were "explicit images of his ex-wife." Vine said she had no comment. "In February 2008, Stuckist artist, Mark D (real name Mark Randall) opened a show of satirical paintings based on Vine's work."

Vine's mother, who had been ill with Crohn's disease, died suddenly from bowel cancer around this time which led to Vine's high creative drive and the creation of her darkest paintings.

=== Rosy Wilde Gallery ===
In 2002 – 2003, Vine studied Philosophical Aesthetics with Johnathan Lahey Dronsfield at Birkbeck College whilst also attending the course Performance After Warhol with Professor Gavin Butt in 2002, and Women's Work with Kathy Battista at Tate Modern. She said she also found much of her art education through the Serpentine Gallery bookshop and became involved with East London artist-run galleries.

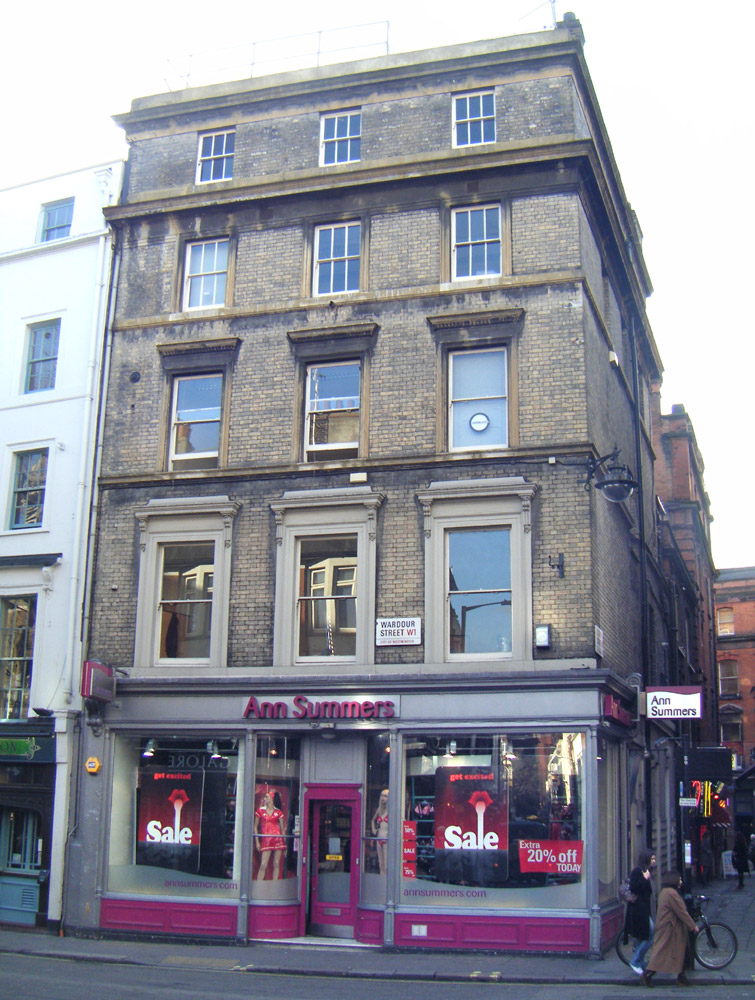
The second Rosy Wilde gallery, in Wardour Street, London.

In 2003, Vine opened the Rosy Wilde gallery on Whitecross Street in east London, as a space that held exhibitions of contemporary art by emerging artists. Vine lived and worked in a studio above the artist-run gallery whilst her son lived in the basement. The gallery was on the verge of bankruptcy, when Charles Saatchi purchased Vine's painting of Diana, Princess of Wales Hi Paul can you come over I'm really frightened. Thanks to the Saatchi purchase and interest in her work, Vine was able to pay the gallery bills. In mid 2004 Vine moved to Spain and the gallery was sold at auction. In 2006, she re-opened her Rosy Wilde gallery, this time in Wardour Street on the first floor above the first Ann Summers sex shop in Soho, London. The gallery closed some years later.

=== The Saatchi effect ===
Vine's portrait of Diana, Princess of Wales, Hi Paul can you come over I'm really frightened (2003), was bought by Charles Saatchi.

Art collector Charles Saatchi discovered Vine's painting in a show called Girl on Girl in Cathy Lomax's Transition Gallery. He purchased Vine's painting of Diana, Princess of Wales Hi Paul can you come over I'm really frightened (2003), for £600 (Vine had originally wanted to price her paintings at £100 each). The painting portrayed the Princess with heavy eyes and blood from her lips. The work's title came from the thick red text painted across the canvas, a reference to Diana's butler Paul Burrell. She painted as many as 30 of Diana alone, having become fascinated by conspiracy theories into the Princess' tragic car crash which she had read on the Internet. Vine destroyed many of these paintings soon after they were created. She put them all, apart from one, in a skip as she did not have enough space to dry nor store the wet paintings.

The price of her paintings "doubled virtually overnight", and as Saatchi anticipated, much of the media attacked the work in his New Blood exhibition, creating a considerable return in publicity for his investment. Media coverage focused on the controversial nature of the painting, as well as the fact that the painting had been bought for only £600 from an unknown artist, who was a single mother and an ex-stripper.

In February 2004, after Vine "rose to fame after being championed by Charles Saatchi", her ex-husband Charles Thomson said that it was he and the Stuckists, not Saatchi, who had "discovered" Vine.

On 28 March 2004, Thomson reported Saatchi to the Office of Fair Trading (OFT) for alleged breaches of the Competition Act and cited as an example Saatchi's promotion of Vine. The OFT did not uphold the complaint. In September 2004, Vine threatened suicide if her work was included in The Stuckists Punk Victorian show at the Liverpool Biennial; the owner of the painting withdrew it.

A subsequent purchase by Saatchi of Vine's painting of Rachel Whitear (also with blood running from the mouth) created further media reaction, as Whitear was a former drug user, whose body was due for exhumation. Vine refused to acquiesce to the parents and police's request not to exhibit the painting, then on view in the Saatchi Gallery in the New Blood show during March 2004. Richard Dorment, The Daily Telegraph critic, described the work as "another stab at creating the visual equivalent of tabloid journalism." Vine said she was upset that some people, including her relatives, didn't like her image of Diana, as she believed it was not a disrespectful picture but was in fact a self-portrait as much as a depiction of Diana: "The picture is about two women. One who lived in Kensington Palace. And the other who lives down the Whitecross Street. 'I look at the picture,' says Vine, 'and I also see myself'".

In June 2004, Vine held her first solo exhibition, Prozac and Private Views, at Transition Gallery, London. Vine was interviewed about the exhibition by Jenni Murray for the BBC Radio 4 programme Woman's Hour.

In September 2004, Vine went back to her home town of Alnwick, where she donated 3 paintings to the Bailiffgate Museum collection, the local museum. Two of the paintings were autobiographical. One painting called The Rumbling Kurn (2003) shows part of the Alnwick shoreline near Howick beach, whilst 27 Clayport Gardens (2004) depicts Vine in a pram as a child "outside her grandmother's old house". The third work depicts Catherine Deneuve in the film Belle de Jour (1968) called Belle (2004) is a painting with collage, including a pink satin ribbon and a small cut out ink jet print of a bee, stuck onto the painting. The name Belle is painted in red across the circular board.

In 2005, Vine lived in Los Angeles having been invited by the Roberts & Tilton gallery to put on a solo show there The solo exhibition Petal (Part Two) ran from 3 June – 2 July 2005. Vine returned to London's Bloomsbury district, using a local Camera Café as her office. There followed solo shows in Israel, Los Angeles, London and New York. She was included in the second Prague Biennale. Also in 2005, her solo show of new paintings Stellawood was staged at Tim Jefferies' gallery in Mayfair, London. At this time, Vine collaborated with the artist James Jessop for the exhibition Fame at the This Way Up Gallery above the Dragon Bar in East London. The installation of paintings was based on the New York graffiti scene of the 1980s, including depictions of Fab Five Freddy, Keith Haring and Blondie.

In July 2005, Vine made a painting of the No. 30 London bus which had been destroyed by a suicide bomber in Tavistock Square, outside her Bloomsbury flat during the 7 July 2005 London bombings. Vine painted over the artwork almost as soon as she had made it, as she found the work "simply too disturbing". Vine documented the bus painting before she re-painted over it, but refuses to show the photographs publicly during her lifetime. She described it as stunning and moving but "extremely harrowing to paint because there were bodies on the bus." The canvas now shows the model Abi Titmuss wearing bleeding red shoes.

Vine has made a number of large paintings of Kate Moss including Holy water cannot help you now (2005) and Kate unfinished (2005). Some of Vine's paintings of the supermodel were painted during the media scandal regarding Moss' alleged cocaine use. One painting of Moss exhibited at Hiscox Art Projects in London, had a slogan Must be the season of the witch across it in red paint. Vine compared the supermodel to the Mona Lisa and said: "There's a bravery in Kate's eyes." Vine herself admitted to a four-month cocaine addiction. She said, "I had been painting Kate Moss for a long time, both before the time of her crisis and during it. I felt very strongly for her—she's a hard-working mum and it seemed as if suddenly the world turned against her." Vine said the media should not have accused Moss of being a bad mother, commenting that "men can go off and take as many drugs as they want, have as many children as they want, and their parenting rarely comes into question". A Vine painting of Kate Moss was bought by fashion designer, Alexander McQueen.

In the February 2009 issue of Gay Times, Vine discussed the 'tabloid frenzy' and media scrutiny that followed Saatchi collecting her work in 2004: "In the beginning it was a real battle to assert any kind of intelligence at all." She was happy the media gave her a platform when no one else did, giving the "opportunity for people to see my work and make their own decisions".

=== Other works and exhibitions ===
Stella Vine. Holy water cannot help you now, a painting of Kate Moss.

Vine has created art installations and sculpture using found objects. In the work Girl in Lourdes (2004), Vine created an installation using found objects such as a mannequin, a dress, a wig, a prayer book, holy water, a Lourdes candle, a found Lourdes souvenir, a Virgin Mary figurine, a table with flowers in a jam jar. A wall painting with the slogan Hotel Saint Bernadette accompanied the work and the mannequin had also been painted on by the artist. Another work Sylvia cooker (2004), Vine painted poems by Sylvia Plath in enamel onto a found gas cooker, with a portrait of Plath decorating the oven door.

After her work was being collected by Saatchi, Vine's dealers told her they had sold paintings when in fact they had saved the best works for themselves. Commenting on her experiences in the commercial gallery world, Vine said: "The art world is really exactly the same as the sex industry: you have to be completely on guard, you will get shafted, fucked over left, right and centre." Vine said: "I have always been ambitious, no doubt about that. I always felt like I had to reach the dizzy heights of fame and success or whatever the heights are of a number of given professions I have dabbled in, to prove myself, "Stripper of the year", a Bafta or whatever, for me it was by creating something interesting and entertaining or moving, but not by compromising the thing I was creating, that thing had to reach those heights, I guess it's about being accepted and loved a bit or a lot."

In 2006, Vine launched Stellacam, which ran all day, every day for a 3-month period, enabling fans to watch her painting at her Bloomsbury studio and home. The webcam feed was streamed live online via her website and at social networking website MySpace. Stellacam had an audience of thousands.

In June 2006, Vine held a solo show at the Bailiffgate Museum in Alnwick called Whatever Happened to Melissa Jane?. The exhibition title played on the title of the film Whatever Happened to Baby Jane? (1962).

In August 2006, she was featured in the tabloids, when her painting of Celebrity Big Brother stars, Samuel "Ordinary Boy" Preston and Chantelle Houghton, "was used as the invitation to their wedding".

In September and October 2006, Vine exhibited a solo show The Waltz at the Museum of New Art in Detroit. Rather than a regular exhibition, Vine painted a large-scale mural across the museum space over a period of five days. The "live painting performance" was filmed and later exhibited alongside the stacked mural as a six-channel video installation showing Vine creating the mural.

From July to September 2007, a major solo show of Vine's work was held at Modern Art Oxford. The show included more than 100 paintings which had not previously had much exposure, and also work made specially for the show, including a new Diana, Princess of Wales series of paintings such as Diana branches (2007) and Diana family picnic (2007). Vine hoped these new works would show Diana's combined strength and vulnerability as well as her close relationship with her sons, Prince William and Prince Harry. Vine covered the shipping costs of more than 100 works by giving the museum four of her paintings valued at £46,000. and oversaw the set up and installation of her exhibition at the museum herself, though did not attend the opening press launch day or any of the private view evenings. Richard Dorment of The Daily Telegraph praised Vine's work in the show for its ability to "skewer celebrity culture with a vitality and truth that can't be faked". A book accompanied the exhibition, including an essay by Germaine Greer. On 18 September 2007, Greer gave a talk about Vine's art with gallery director Andrew Nairne, though Vine notably failed to turn up. All of the paintings in the exhibition were sold.

Lynn Barber, writing for The Observer described Vine as "the real deal", and Paul Moody praised her work for "causing a storm in the art world". Arifa Akbar of The Independent compared Vine's examination of the culture of celebrity as coming from the same tradition as pop art founder, Andy Warhol. Vine declared a strong connection to Warhol, having studied his work in depth on an art course.

In July 2007, Vine collaborated with Topshop clothing chain, creating a limited edition fashion range inspired by her artworks. These included T-shirts with slogans such as Breaks Up With Her Boyfriend.

In November 2008, it was announced that Vine had begun painting a series of new work for a large solo show at the Eden Project, Cornwall, England to be held in 2010. In January 2012, it was announced that Vine would paint a portrait of the Brontë sisters to help raise money for the repair of St Michael and All Angels Parish Church in Haworth, West Yorkshire, where Patrick Brontë was curate.

== Charitable work ==
In 2005, Stella Vine gave three paintings to the Imagine A World exhibition, organised by Amnesty International. In 2006, she donated a painting of John Peel and his wife to an auction for Terrence Higgins Trust. In 2007, she donated a painting to the Spectrum Art auction to raise money to support autistic children. In 2008, Vine created the painting Didier (2008), depicting Didier Drogba, for the charity Sport Relief. Vine also allowed them to create a limited edition print of Didier (2008) to help raise further funds for the charity. In April 2008, a drawing of author J. K. Rowling by Vine was auctioned for The Merlin Project charity.

== Notable solo shows ==
- 2004 Prozac and Private Views, Transition Gallery, London, UK
- 2004 Petal, Tel Aviv, Israel
- 2005 Stellawood, London, UK
- 2005 Petal (Part Two), Roberts & Tilton, Los Angeles, USA
- 2006 Whatever happened to Melissa Jane?, Alnwick, UK
- 2006 The Waltz, Museum of New Art, Detroit, USA
- 2007 Stella Vine: Paintings, Modern Art Oxford, Oxford, UK

== Collections ==
- Saatchi Gallery
- Bailiffgate Museum
- George Michael (Goss-Michael Foundation)
- Roberts Institute of Art
- Brandes Family Collection, Israel
- Jacopelli Collection, Italy
- Adele
- Robert Diament
- Alexander McQueen
- Private Collections in UK, USA, Israel, Italy, Germany and Canada
