= Martin of Alnwick =

English friar and theologian (died 1336)

Martin Alnwick or of Alnwick (died 1336) was an English Franciscan friar and theologian.

== Biography ==
Little is known of Alnwick's early years. He certainly originated from Northumberland, and a 'Martinus' is recorded in several disputations at Oxford University at the end of the 13th-century, possibly Alnwick. The first definite record of Alnwick was in 1300, where he was one of the Oxford friars who unsuccessfully requested the licence to hear confessions from the bishop of Lincoln, John Dalderby. At Oxford, Alnwick soon received a Doctor of Theology and, in 1304, became the 32nd regent master of the university's Franciscan schools.

In 1311, Alnwick was summoned to Avignon to participate in a controversy surrounding poverty among Franciscan friars, with the radical Spiritual Franciscans supporting absolute poverty among Franciscans, and the more orthodox Conventual Franciscans taking the side of wealth. He was made one of four advisors to the general minister, and spoke in favour of the Conventuals. The Council of Vienne (1311-2) eventually declared in favour of this sect.

On 1 October 1318, Alnwick's previous request was vindicated, as he obtained a license to hear confessions in the diocese of York. A volume was composed, recording his Determinacio and disputations, and held in the library of the Augustinian Friary, York, though it is now lost. According to John Bale, Alnwick died in 1336 and was buried at Newcastle.

== Works ==
The one work reliably attributed to Martin Alnwick is nineteen questions at the end of William of Ware's commentary on Peter Lombard's The Four Books of Sentences. This commentary, and Alnwick's questions, are scattered among five separate manuscripts (Bordeaux, Bibliothèque Municipale, MS 163; Troyes, Bibliothèque Municipale, MS 501; Vatican City, Biblioteca Apostolica Vaticana, MS Vat. lat. 4871, MS Vat. Chigi B. VII. 114; Vienna, Nationalbibliothek, MS 1424). These questions elucidate Alnwick's difficulties when contemplating God's nature. The majority of the questions are inspired by established Franciscan theology, but several follow in the less orthodox tradition of the secular philosopher, Henry of Ghent. Some questions accept Henry's idea of the division of god into his "speculative and practical ideas", though Alnwick opposes Henry on some other theological issues.

Two other works have been falsely attributed to Alnwick: a commentary on books 1–2 of the Sentences, now held at the library of San Antonio, Padua, which is now known to be by William Alnwick; and a "universal chronicle" printed in 1750, now known to be by Martin of Opava.
