= Nadia Hebson =

British artist

Nadia Hebson (born 1974 in Romsey, Hampshire) is a British artist.

== Life and career ==
Hebson attended St. Martins School of Art (1993–96) and then the Royal Academy in London (1997–2000).

In 2007, she was awarded the Derek Hill Rome Scholarship at the British School at Rome. In 2008, she was appointed Artist in Residence at Durham Cathedral, and was in 2008 presented with the Sovereign European Art Prize by Jarvis Cocker, Tim Marlow, Sir Peter Blake and Alan Yentob.

== Shows ==
- Gravidity & Parity & Hatton Gallery, Newcastle 2018
- Can you forgive her? Drop City Gallery, Newcastle 2015
- Can you forgive her? MAUVE Gallery, Vienna 2015
- Moda WK at Vane Gallery, Newcastle, 2013
- Bergholzli, Newcastle in 2005.
- Grand Mal, Transition Gallery, London.
- Phantasmagoria, Chapter Gallery, Cardiff in 2003

== Awards and prizes ==
In 2003, she was awarded the BOC Emerging Artist Award which was selected by Matthew Collings and Sir Peter Blake RA. She has also received the Andre De Segonzac Travel Award, the British Institute Drawing Prize, the Vincent Harris Award, the Arte Viva Painting Prize, Italy and the Cohn and Wolfe Painting Prize, selected by Andrew Graham Dixon.

In 2005, she won the Duveen Woman Artists Award and the Casson Drawing Prize along with Paula Rego and Frank Auerbach. In 2006 and 2007, she received the Arts Council England Individual Award. In 2008, Hebson was also nominated by Humphrey Ocean RA for The Arts Foundation Fellowship programme.

== Works ==
Hebson makes paintings, both figurative and abstract, clothing and objects which are intimately but indirectly, linked to the conventions and history of painting. Most recently, working obliquely with the legacy of women artists, her work has sought to comprehend the relationship between painting and clothing through a consideration of the work of Winifred Knights b.1899 d.1946 and Christina Ramberg b.1946 d.1995.

Hebson has also made a series of intense, romantic and darkly atmospheric seascapes and shipwrecks which are reminiscent of the Gustave Doré prints for Samuel Taylor Coleridge's:The Rime of the Ancient Mariner

Nadia Hebson studied at Central Saint Martins and the Royal Academy Schools. She was then a Lecturer in Fine Art at Newcastle University before leaving her post. Interested in the divisive notion of ‘an appropriate education for women’ she runs the reading group, an open reading project that explores the subjective female voice in literature.

== Sources ==
- Natasha Soobramanien "Can you forgive her?", Frieze Magazine, 17 Feb 2015
- Charles Darwent "Jerwood Contemporary Painters, Jerwood Space, London Tess Jaray, Lyon & Turnbull", The Independent on Sunday, 20 April 2008
- Peter Suchin, Catalogue essay for Bergholzli, 2007

== Bibliography ==
- Royal Academy Illustrated 2008, ISBN 978-1-905711-12-3
- Fine Arts Catalogue 2007-2008, The British School at Rome, ISBN 978-0-904152-52-4
- Fable, Exhibition Catalogue, Angela Kingston and Gordon Dalton, Chapter Publications, ISBN 1-900029-22-7
- Phantasmagoria, Critical text by Annabel Dover, Chapter Publications, 2003
