= Sartorial Contemporary Art =

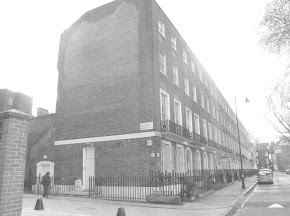

- Location within Central London
- Established: 2005
- Location: Argyle Square, Kings Cross, London 8AP, England, United Kingdom
- Coordinates: 51.5284°N 0.1217°W
- Website: www.sartorialart.com

Sartorial Contemporary Art (2005–2010) was an artist-run gallery founded by Gretta Sarfaty Marchant, artist and curator, as a project-led space in central London, England. Originally based in an 18th-century Georgian house on Kensington Church Street. Sartorial Contemporary Art moved to Kings Cross in October 2008 where it has built a reputation for embracing newly emerging artists.

The Guardian said of the Harry Pye exhibition, Me, me, me, "the gallery space has achieved maturity and it has become a real space within the artistic circuit." Sartorial Contemporary Art in house magazine The Rebel started in 2005, in collaboration with Harry Pye is released four times a year, usually connected with a current exhibition theme.

== Exhibitions ==
Among the most remarkable shows in Sartorial Contemporary Art the following are worth mentioning:

- Water, Jasper Joffe - book launch & multimedia collaborative exhibition with: Markus Vater, Akiko Usami, Jaime Gili, Paul Haworth, Mike Ralph, Stephen Nelson, House of O'Dwyer, Catrin Huber, Harry Pye, Tara Cranswick, Kit Wise, Rose Gibbs, Stella Vine, Sonia Khurana, Simeon Banner, Gretta Sarfaty, Martin Sexton, Adam Dant, Phil McCluney, Peter Lamb, Jared Fisher, Si Sapsford, Daiana Stanescu, James Jessop, Marta Marce, Saron Hughes, Peter Harris, Justin Coombes, Louise Camrass, Jesse Chambers, Matthew Collings, Rowland Smith, Vasiliki Gkotsi, Alex Hamilton (25.04 - 5.05.2006).
- Obsession, group exhibition curated by Robin Mason: Allman Mason, Debra Allman, Andy Bannister, Ann-Caroline Breig, Michael Buhler, Tony Carter, Gerald Davies, Teresita Dennis, Zavier Ellis, Tessa Farmer, Conrad Frankel, Shelly Goldsmith, Andrew Grassie, Takayuki Hara, Barnaby Hosking, Jane Howarth, Katarina Ivanisin, James Jessop, Tatsuya Kimata, Mette Klarskov Larsen, Gretta Sarfaty, Robin Mason, Hektor Mamet, Hugh Mendes, Gavin Nolan, Kate Palmer, Tim Parr, Hideyuki Sawayanagi, Wendy Smith, Amikam Toren, James Unsworth (13.10 -2.11.2006)
- Unnatural Selection, Gavin Nolan, solo exhibition (9.11 - 1.12.2006)
- Artistic Vandals II, Martin Lea Brown, Tomas Downes, Cyclops, Gretta Sarfaty, Nathan 80, Noogie, O.two, Mr. P / Shaze, James Jessop, William Tuck, Martin Walter; curated by James Jessop (12.12.2006 - 8.02.2007)
- Mothers, 100 artists pay tribute to their mums including; Dinos Chapman, Billy Childish, Nicola Hicks MBE, Mat Humphrey, Neil Innes, Chantal Joffe, Jasper Joffe, Andrew Mania, Liz Neal, Grayson Perry, Vic Reeves, David Shrigley, Geraldine Swayne, Francis Upritchard, Daisy de Villenurve, Sophie von Hellermann, Richard Wathen, etc. (29.02 - 8.03.2008)
- The Portrait, Mat Humphrey and Wen Wu (11.09 - 1.10.2008)
- Burning Candy, urban street artists' exhibition: Cyclops, Sweet Toof and Tek33; with a limited edition book, text by Olly Beck (16.10 - 11.11.2008)
- Does the Royal Family Like Pornography (sic)?, Jasper Joffe's solo exhibition (19.11 - 13.12.2008)
- Gretta's Progress - Sartorial presented Gretta Sarfaty at Leeds College of Art & Design, curated by Olly Beck & Harry Pye. As part of the exhibition there was a live Art Opera Performance Installation Again and Again by Gretta Sarfaty and Mister Solo. The exhibition coincided with lectures about the exhibition with Jasper Joffe and Harry Pye with the participation of James Jessop and launch of Gretta's Progress 3 films by Gordon Beswick (3.12.2008 - 2.01.2009)
- Marcus Freeman / Stephen Peirce. New Paintings (4.09 - 25.09.2009)
- Urbanart, Panik, Cyclops, James Jessop, Rowdy and Sweet Toof (27.11 – 19.12.2009)
- Through A Glass Darkly, an interactive performance installation by Gretta Sarfaty with the participation of Francesco Quaglia; introductory text by Olly Beck. The exhibition coincided with the launch of The Rebel magazine (10.2 – 6.03.2010)
- Liz Neal. New Paintings (11.03-3.04.2010)
- We’re In It for Money, Stella Vine's paintings (9.09 - 24.09.2010)
- Harry Pye's Values - New Paintings and Video. This exhibition coincides with the launch of a limited edition of The Rebel magazine, The Values Issue (29.09 - 28.10.2010)
- Performative, Jake and Dinos Chapman, Nicola Ruben Montini and Gretta Sarfaty (7.06 – 28.07.2011)
- "Tasseography", Olympia Polymeni's first solo show in the UK.
- Landscape, Marcus Freeman's new paintings (29.09 – 18.10.2011)

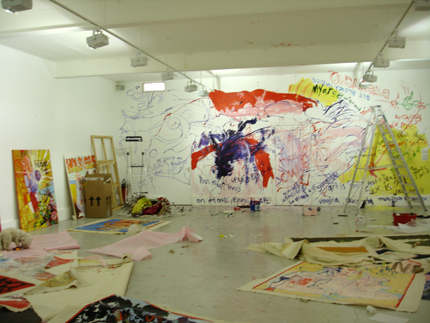
Liz Neal, Some Product, Sartorial Contemporary Art, 20.02 - 14.03.2009

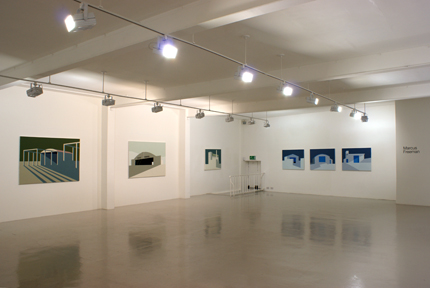
Marcus Freeman - Stephen Peirce. New Paintings, Sartorial Contemporary Art, 2009

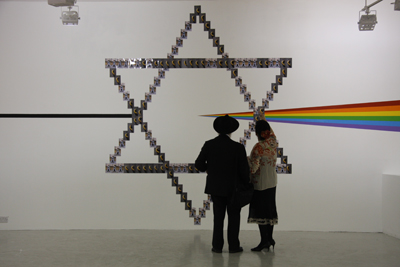
Gretta Sarfaty Marchant, Permutations, Sartorial Contemporary Art, 1-23.05.2009

== Related links ==
- Sartorial Contemporary Art
- Gretta Sarfaty Marchant's website
