= 100 Mothers =

100 Mothers was an art exhibition curated by Harry Pye that originally took place at the "Oh Art" Gallery at The Oxford House, Bethnal Green in March 2004. Pye put the show together with help from several artist friends including Elizabeth Haarala, Mat Humphrey, Jasper Joffe and Emma Ridgway (Curator).

== Show in Bethnal Green ==
Pye's aim was to stage the most straightforward and irony-free exhibition possible in time for Mother's Day that year. His friends supplied fifty male and fifty female artists with the same size canvas and asked each one to make a painting based on their own mother. Among those who took part in the original show were Dinos Chapman, Vic Reeves, Grayson Perry, Richard Wathen, Neil Innes, Bob & Roberta Smith, Billy Childish and Liz Neal.

Three artists featured in the show (Daisy de Villeneuve, Geraldine Swayne, and Sarah Sparkes) were interviewed about their contributions on the BBC Radio Four show Woman's Hour. Several other artists including Mat Humphrey, Peter Harris and Rowland Smith were interviewed about their paintings and their mothers by Don't Panic magazine. A brochure designed by Elizabeth Haarala and Keith Sargent was sold at the show; this featured an introduction written by poet Benjamin Zephaniah, with contributions from John Hegley and Jock Scot.

== Other versions of the show ==
The exhibition toured to the North Edinburgh Art Centre in Scotland. In March 2008 the exhibition took place again, this time at the Sartorial Contemporary Art gallery
