= The Rebel (art magazine) =

British art magazine

The Rebel is an independent British art magazine established by artist Harry Pye in 1985. It features interviews, reviews with artists, and parodies of features from other publications. Often the cover of the magazine features an image of a rebel from history such as Jesus, Karl Marx, Valerie Solanas, or Van Gogh. In December 2007 The Rebel made fun of ArtReview's annual list of the most powerful people in the art world. In August 2008 an entire issue of The Rebel was dedicated to the number four.

== History ==
The magazine was named after The Rebel a film with Tony Hancock in the lead which was released in 1961 and written by Ray Galton and Alan Simpson. The Rebel is sold at Publish And Be Damned (an annual self-publishing fair), the Tate Britain bookshop, and the Institute of Contemporary Arts.

In January 2008 the editors of the magazine – Jasper Joffe, Gretta Sarfaty Marchant, and Harry Pye – were interviewed by art critic Ana Finel Honigman for Saatchi Online. The Rebel is the in-house publication of the London Art Gallery, Sartorial Contemporary Art. Artists who have designed covers for The Rebel include Bob London, John Strutton, Bob and Roberta Smith, and James Unsworth. Artists who have been interviewed by the magazine include Liz Neal, Stella Vine, Rose Gibbs, James Jessop, Mat Humphrey, and Martin Sexton. Contributors to The Rebel include John Hind, Rebecca Geldard, Cathy Lomax, Nathan Penlington, Andrew Petrie, and Stephanie Moran.

The magazine has also featured interviews with musicians and comedians such as Frank Sidebottom, Malcolm Hardee, Stephen Duffy, Mr Solo, Tom Bell, Robin Ince, Terry Edwards, Robert Newman, Paul Foot, Quilla Constance and Trevor Lock. The Winter 2010 issue came with a free four track C.D by a new band called The Values. The launch of the magazine, which coincided with an exhibition at the gallery called Values, was featured in Amelia's Magazine. In October 2010 Harry Pye launched an online version of The Rebel. The Rebel Magazine blogspot.com consists of short interviews with musicians and artists such as Paul Heaton, Mick Harvey, and Pete & The Pirates. On the 31st of March 2018 John Hind wrote a feature about Tate Modern's Inside Job exhibition for The Guardian. The Rebel magazine interviewed more than 50 of the artists who took part in Inside Job. Quotes from a few of these interviews were included in Hind's Guardian article.
