= Banner Repeater =

Coordinates: 51.5483°N 0.0601°W

Banner Repeater is an artist run reading room and project space, on Hackney Downs railway station, Dalston Lane, London. It is named after the "banner repeater", a type of railway signal used in Great Britain.

The reading room holds a collection of artist's books and other printed material, for both browsing and purchase. The permanent collection is home to Publish And Be Damned's public library. The project space arts programme, of exhibitions, events and performance, publishes pamphlets and posters, which are free to take away from the library trolley on the platform, and when closed from a box outside the reading room.

The project is driven by its location within a working station environment, developing critical art in the public realm, in the natural interstice the platform and incidental footfall of over 4,000 passengers a day provides.

Banner Repeater is open from 8 to 11 am Tuesday to Thursday, to target the early morning commuters, as well as more usual gallery hours of 8 am to 6 pm on Friday and noon to 6 pm over the weekend.

The project was supported for the first year by an Empty Shop Fund grant from the local government initiative, Art in Empty Spaces 2010, and an Arts Council England grant for the arts programme 2010-11. Banner Repeater is one of a series of projects supported by Hackney Council intended to bring empty shops and premises back to life. The projects are financed by central government funding awarded to the Council for the first year, and are to provide activities that will benefit Hackney's residents and visitors.

== Reading Room ==
The archive of artists printed material is a permanent browsing library, to be used as a resource by visitors, and includes Publish and be Damned’s public library .

The archive is an ongoing and accumulative project, and is contributed to individually by artists as well as publishers working closely with artists, and artist run galleries who share an interest in the artist produced publication.

There are thousands of contributions from many different independent publishers, and self-publishing artists such as: Book Works, Matt's Gallery, MOT gallery, Chelsea Space, Vilma Gold, Four Corners Books, IMT Gallery, FormContent, n.ow.here, Gagarin, Gandt, Use this Kind of Sky, MONO, Monaco, the paper, Lubok Verlag, the Happy Hypocrite, MOUSSE, Hatos Press, Woodmill studios, David Garcia studios, Ambit, FOLIO, the Semina series, the Institute of Social Hypocrisy.

An on-line archive represents the thousands of artists held in the browsing library at Banner Repeater, as a searchable index on the website. The website has an online shop selling much of the material to be found in the bookshop including many hard-to-find artists books.

== Project Space ==
The project space runs an arts programme that includes exhibitions, events and performance, and shares many ideas relating to publishing, with regards to the distribution and dissemination of material. The programme hosts a series of talks by artists, writers, and theoreticians, that are open to all. A selection of these are hosted on the website.

A reading group regularly meets at the reading room and project space with an interest in artists printed material, commissioning artists readings throughout the year. The publishing forum and critical framework group, that meet once a month, are peer-led and publish an annual critical journal from Banner Repeater.

Artworks developed by artists working at Banner Repeater are available to download for free from the website. The website was archived by the British Library Web Archiving Programme 2011.
