= Åbäke =

Transdisciplinary graphic design collective

Åbäke is a transdisciplinary graphic design collective, founded in 2000 by Patrick Lacey (British), Benjamin Reichen (French), Kajsa Ståhl (Swedish) and Maki Suzuki (French) in London, England, after meeting at the Royal College of Art.

Members of Åbäke co-founded Sexymachinery (Magazine, 2000–2008), Kitsuné (Record label, 2002-2012), Dent-De-Leone (Publishing house, 2009), Drawing Room Confession (Art journal, 2011). They have taught at RCA (2004–2010), Central St Martins (2005-2015), IUAV (2009), HEAD (2012-on going), Isia Urbino (2013), Camberwell (2015), Chelsea (2015) and Yale (2015)

== Biography ==
Åbäke is a collective of four graphic designers: Patrick Lacey studied at Brighton University, Kajsa Stahl studied at HDK (Högskolan för Design & Konsthantverk, Gothenburg), Benjamin Reichen and Maki Suzuki studied at the Ecole Nationale Supérieure des Arts Décoratifs in Paris. They meet during the MA in Communication Art and Design at the Royal College of Art (London) and established the studio in the summer of 2000. Much of their work concentrates on the social aspect of design and the strength that collaboration can bring to a project. Events often involve film, dancing, eating and cooking and teaching.

Since their studies they have been collaborating with the designer and artist Martino Gamper on several projects: the book corner for the British Council, Trattoria al Capello, the book 100 Chairs in 100 Days and its 100 Ways and the publishing house Dent-De-Leone. In 2004 Åbäke started a collaboration with the association The Friends of Arnold Circus that develops the public space around Arnold Circus in east London.

Åbäke was selected for the Barbican Art Gallery exhibition Communicate: Independent British Graphic Design since Sixities which was curated by design historian Rick Poynor in 2004 and charted over 40 years of graphic design in the United Kingdom. They have exhibited both in England and internationally at institutions including: and Experimenta Lisbon 2009 in Portugal, the 9th Biennale of contemporary art in Lyon, Stanley Picker Gallery, Triennale di Milano and DeVleeshal in Middelburg.

In 2012 Åbäke curated Unbuilt Helsinki, a research studio, a model workshop and a model room established inside the Museum of Finnish Architecture. The research project branched out from a long term collaboration with artist Nene Tsuboi and architect Tuomas Toivonen which including the building of a public sauna in Helsinki.

In 2012 the collective curated All the Knives (Any printed story on request) where the concept is to make the dynamics of graphic arts more widely known among the general public and to survey into the transdisciplinary nature and new forms of presentation of the medium.

They also participated to discussion about graphic design, groups effects in a graphic design studio, editorial problems and interests, contemporary art.

They have collaborated with artists (like Ryan Gander, Francis Upritchard, Per Hüttner, Johanna Billing, Fritz Haeg), and worked with institutions (like Nouveau musée national de Monaco, Design Museum, Victoria and Albert Museum, Museum of Finnish Architecture, Serpentine Gallery and CASCO), musicians (like The Cardigans, Daft Punk) and designers (like Maison Martin Margiela, Hussein Chalayan, Peter Jensen, Martino Gamper, Virgil Abloh).
