= Harry Pye =

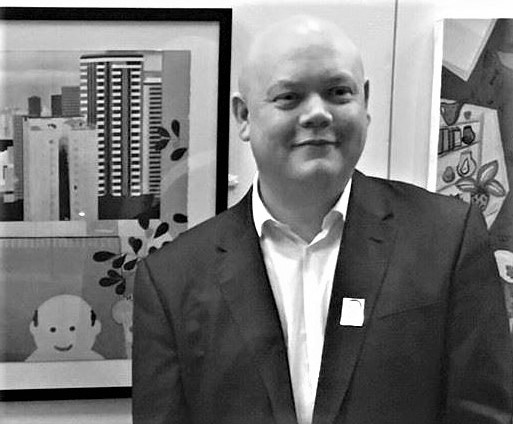

Harry William Pye (born 31 August 1973) is a British artist, writer, and event organizer.

== Early life ==
Pye was born in London. He completed a foundation course at Camberwell School of Art in 1991. He then studied printmaking at Winchester School of Art from 1992 to 1995. In his second year he stopped painting and printmaking and began making films. His first films were interviews with artist and tutor Bruce McLean, and he has since interviewed many other artists including Humphrey Ocean, Jake and Dinos Chapman, Wolfgang Tillmans, and Keith Tyson for various publications including The Face, Turps Banana, and Untitled. He has also edited and published numerous art based fanzines of his own, such as "Harry Pye's FRANK Magazine", which ran from 1995 to 2000.

== Art career ==
In May 2000 he was invited to curate an exhibition at Glassbox in Paris, France. The name of this show was "It May Be Rubbish, But It's British Rubbish". In 2002 he curated a show at The Bart Wells Institute in London Fields, "Viva Pablo". A year later he organized a group show with 100 artists called, 100 MOTHERS which took place at The Oh Art Gallery in the Oxford House in Bethnal Green, and then toured to the North Edinburgh Art Centre in Scotland. This exhibit was also included in The Other Art Fair in 2013. In November 2006 he curated a tribute to the DJ John Peel at the NOMOREGREY Gallery in Shoreditch entitled "For Peel", which consisted of more than 60 artists including Jessica Voorsanger, Sarah Doyle, and Cathy Lomax, all of whom had made work relating to a band or singer that John Peel had discovered or championed. Pye did not contribute any artwork of his own to these exhibitions. According to press release material, he only began making paintings of his own in 2004, inspired by a Royal Academy exhibition of Philip Guston and a show about Mathias Kauage at the Horniman Museum, which both took place in this same year.

Pye's first solo show took place at Sartorial Contemporary Art in Notting Hill in February 2007. The name of his show was, "Me, Me, Me". As well as more than 20 paintings, the show featured a 30-minute video made in collaboration with artist Gordon Beswick and comedy writers and performers Richard Herring and Robin Ince. Pye's second solo show at Sartorial was called "Getting Better" and took place in March 2009. His third Sartorial show was called "Values" and took place in September 2010.

Pye has made collaborative paintings with various other artists including Gordon Beswick, Rowland Smith, Marcus Cope, Kes Richardson, James Jessop, Billy Childish, Frank Sidebottom, Sarah Sparkes, Liz Murray, Geraldine Swayne, and Mat Humphrey. Almost half of the paintings in the "Me, Me, Me" show were collaborations with Rowland Smith, who Pye has known since his school days.

In March 2007 Jessica Lack of The Guardian described him as "the master of lo-fi British art".

In April 2007 Pye won first prize in a competition to paint a portrait of Tony Blair, organised by the Daily Mirror. The judges were artists Gilbert and George.

In April 2008 Pye had several of his paintings featured in an exhibition called, "Everyday Life" at The Tom Christoffersen Gallery in Denmark. In the same month he had a solo show at the Thomas Cohn Gallery – a 5,500-square-foot (510 m^{2}) space in São Paulo, Brazil.

In June 2008 Pye curated a group exhibition called "Poetic Licence" at the Crimes Town Gallery in Stoke Newington. The show featured drawings and paintings inspired by poems and visitors to the gallery could only gain entry if they brought with them a poem that had moved or inspired them. Artists taking part in the project included Lloyd Durling, Marenka Gabeler, Marisol Malatesta, Mark McGowan, John Moseley, and Edward Ward.

In September 2008 Pye and Rowland Smith exhibited several paintings they had made in collaboration in a show called Fresh Air Machine at a new Shoreditch art space called Calvert 22. The show was supported by the Outset organization and was part of the Concrete and Glass festival.

In October 2008 Pye helped organize a Black History Month exhibition at the Lime Light Gallery in Lewisham.

In December 2008 Pye helped organize Gretta Sarfaty Marchant's solo show "Gretta's Progress" at Leeds Arts University.

Pye has recently been collaborating with artist Jasper Joffe on projects and exhibitions such as Jasper & Harry's Tate Modern, Matisse at Christmas, and the 99p Art Shop. On 6 August 2011 critic Ekow Eshun was asked to review the exhibition "Joffe et Pye" for BBC Radio 4's Saturday Review, and wrote that: "Intense feelings about love, loneliness and fear, anxiety, desire and hope, and ambition all come into play into these paintings. Very powerful I thought. What could have been fey, arch, or game playing was actually very warm."

In November 2012 six paintings by Harry Pye were featured in the Discerning Eye exhibition at The Mall Gallery in London. Pye's work in this show was praised by Naomi Mdudu of City AM.

In January 2013 it was announced on Resonance FM that Pye and Francis Macdonald were working on a music project together and had collaborated on ten new songs.

Pye's artwork has been displayed on the London Underground in conjunction with the arts company Art Below. Ben Moore of Art Below featured Pye's works along with Peter Kennard, Nasser Azam, Moore, and six other artists as part of Thatcheristic.

In 2013 Harry Pye curated his own South London Salon which was part of the Deptford X festival.

In October 2014 Harry Pye selected 17 artists for a show at Hotel Elephant for an exhibition called Jolie Laide. The exhibition was part of Elefest, the Elephant and Castle festival. On 7 April 2018 Pye's art work featured in a group exhibition at the Tate Modern called "Inside Job". The exhibition was previewed by John Hind in The Guardian on 31 March.

Since 2005 Pye has written a column about the London art scene for Estonian newspaper Epifanio, as well as being the editor of The Rebel.

In June 2022 it was announced on art rabbit.com and a-n The Artists Information Company that Harry Pye would be organising an exhibition in Fitzrovia Gallery called 'Always On My Mind.' The exhibition would feature work by; Magda Archer, Gordon Beswick, Sasha Bowles, Nick Cave, Billy Childish, Matthew Collings, Alice Herrick, Corin Johnson, James Johnston, Francis Macdonald, Kate Murdoch, Carson Parkin-Fairley, Elena-Andreea Teleaga, Twinkle Troughton and Tracey Williams. The exhibition aimed to raise money and awareness of The National Brain Appeal.

In August 2023 it was announced on Fitztrovia News, that Pye had organised a second 'Always On My Mind' exhibition at the same gallery as before. This second show would feature work by sixteen different artists; John Peter Askew, Marcus Cope, Clare Chapman, Jeremy Deller, Edie Flowers, Russell Herron, Nicola Hicks, Kim James Williams, Dominic Kennedy, James Lawson, Lee Maelzer, Bruce McLean, Raksha Patel, Louise Reynolds, Geraldine Swayne, and Sarah Wood.

Once again the aim of the show was to help The National Hospital of Neurology and Neurosurgery and the UCL Queen Square Institute of Neurology, for whom The National Brain Appeal is the dedicated charity.
