= Death to the fascist insect that preys upon the life of the people! =

"Death to the fascist insect that preys upon the life of the people!" may refer to:

- A motto originally used by the Symbionese Liberation Army.
- A 2001 group art exhibition, edited by Malcolm Maloney, at Anthony D'Offay Gallery, London, featuring work of Tea Jorjadze, Liz Neal, and Markus Vater.
