= Gretta Sarfaty =

Brazilian artist (born 1947)

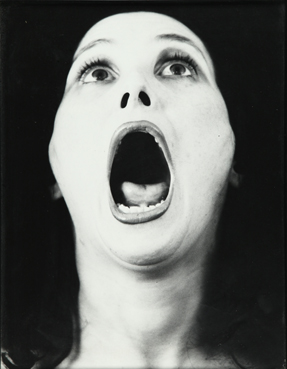
Gretta Sarfaty, 1976. Auto-Photos III (detalhe), Photography.

Gretta Sarfaty (born Alegre Sarfaty; also known as Gretta Grzywacz and Greta Sarfaty Marchant or mononymously as Gretta) is a painter, photographer, and multimedia artist who earned international acclaim in the 1970s for her artistic works related to body art and feminism. Born in 1947 in Greece, she moved with her family to São Paulo in 1954, being naturalised as Brazilian.

Alongside her art, she was the founder of the artist-run space Sartorial Contemporary Art (2005–2010), and since 2010 she keeps an art collection called Alegre Sarfaty Collection.

From the 1970s, Gretta developed her artistic career. She took fine arts classes in São Paulo, at FAAP and the Escola Pan Americana de Artes - she was taught by artists working also in São Paulo, including Walter Lewy, Ivald Granato, Mário Gruber, and Savério Castellano. She studied photography with the photographer Julio Abe Wakahara during 1975. Due to her artistic work and exhibitions, she moved to Paris, Milan and New York.

Gretta exhibited her work at institutions such as Museu de Arte Contemporânea da Universidade de São Paulo (MAC/USP), Museu de Arte Moderna de São Paulo (MAM/SP), Museu de Arte de São Paulo (MASP), Museu Nacional de Belas Artes (MNBA), Pinacoteca do Estado de São Paulo, Moreira Salles Institute, Museu de Arte da Pampulha (MAP), Musée d'Art Moderne de la Ville de Paris, Museo MACRO Asilo, Palazzo dei Diamanti di Ferrara, Foundation Calouste Gulbenkian, Fundação Vera Chaves Barcellos (FVCB), Centre Georges Pompidou, Internationaal Cultureel Centrum, New York University (NYU), among others.

== Personal life ==
Gretta was born in Athens in 1947 to parents of Italian, Greek and Turkish origin, and was named Alegre Sarfaty. In 1954, her family moved to São Paulo, Brazil.

== Artistic career ==
Throughout her career Gretta exhibited mainly in São Paulo, New York and London. In the 70s, she participated in numerous solo shows in Brazil displaying her early paintings. Her world travels and mixed background had an influence on her more contemporary visual work – particularly her photography and collages which deal with themes of identity and culture. Marchant's work spans a wide range of media including installations, photography, video, paintings, and performance art.

=== Brazil and Europe ===
At the beginning of the 1970s, she started creating the Metamorphosis series of paintings, and her work was noted by the Brazilian gallerist Franco Terranova, who participated in the Bienal Internacional de Arte de São Paulo in 1975. In 1976, he showed her works in the Galeria de Arte Global in São Paulo. In 1979, she had several shows in Germany (Karlsruhe) and in Italy (Galleria Diagramma, Milan; Palazzo dei Diamanti, Ferrara) and also in Paris at the Centre Georges Pompidou, where she performed the Evocative Recollections. In 1980, she held the exhibition Evocative Recollections & Transformations at the Museu de Arte Contemporânea (MAC/São Paulo). In 1983, she created a series of paintings with a book dedicated to the Brazilian culture, Self-Portrait of Brazil, a publication containing a series of paintings by the artist and texts about important personalities from the country. It was exhibited at the Museu de Arte de São Paulo (MASP) and was part of the 2011 exhibition Arte como Registro, Registro como Arte, na Pinacoteca do Estado de São Paulo.

==== Auto-Photos ====
This series of photos from 1976 is one of the first Marchant's artworks dedicated to female identity and its various demonstrations: her face appears in sequences of beauty and ugliness, grace and madness. A frivolous play with recurrent images of herself is in fact an ironic dialogue with the constructed cultural image of a woman. Marchant expresses in this series the notion of gender performativity, a term created by Judith Butler in 1988.

Roberto Pontual wrote about this work:

The work of Gretta has been originally more related to the language of photography, especially during her recent stay in Europe. Her main focus has always been the female body, including her own body as a symbol of women's condition in our society.

==== Transformations ====
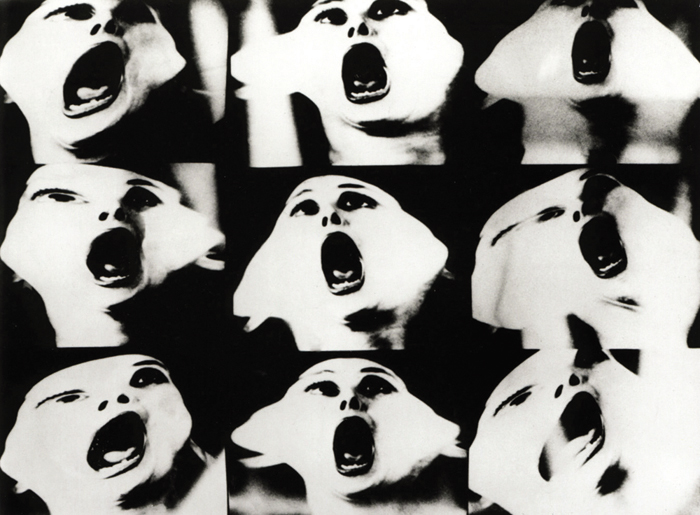
Gretta Sarfaty, 1976. Transformations I. Photography.

This work also focuses on the topic of deconstructing the female image. Marchant's face is being manipulated and distorted.

Rather than the manifestation of personal destructive tendencies, these images should be viewed as the externalisation of a revolt directed against the male cultural stereotype, mortifying as it does the feminine form into the authoritarian and distorting dimension of an abstract and aesthetic beauty, to which the artist opposes the angry vision of a reverse side, through a body that is deformed, disfigured and fragmented.

==== A Women's Diary ====
Another work from 1976, where Marchant uses photography to create a diary of her own body, captured in almost abstract poses. The way that the body appears on the photos calls into question its materiality.

==== Evocative Recollections ====
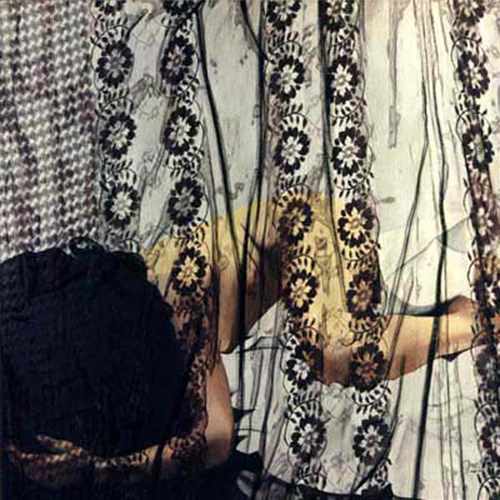
Gretta Sarfaty, 1981. Evocative Recollections XVII. Acrylic on canvas and lace.

In 1979, she performed Evocative Recollections (performance with catalogue) in Centre Georges Pompidou, Paris, as well as in Palazzo dei Diamanti di Ferrara, Italy. This performance was then shown in different locations in Belgium (Internationaal Cultureel Centrum, Antwerp), Brazil and Italy. Under the same title, Evocative Recollections, Marchant continued the topic of female body and women's liberation in the series of photos (1980–1981). In an essay published for Marchant's solo exhibition at the Centro Culturale La Filanda (Verano Italy) Gillo Dorfles wrote about this series:

Sure: such pictures will not be the same with another artist, with another option, however, even considered under a point of view of photographic document, Gretta's corporeal options reach an unusual efficacy. We are in front of a little common combination, between the creative activity of an artist who knows how to enjoy the expressive dynamic and plastic possibilities of her body and the realisation of a photographic documentation which remains autonomous as well as in its technical as in its aesthetic values.

=== New York ===
In 1983, Marchant moved to New York and after a traumatic event, the fire in the Hotel Chelsea, she began a collaboration with American video and multimedia artists (InterComm group). She also started to discover Kabbalah esoteric thought: she became friends with Simon Jacobson and Kenny Vance and she decided to picture the Kabbalah community in her paintings (Kabbalah, 1984–1985). She also created a performance, Goya Time (1985) and a video, My Single Life in New York (1987).

By the time she was represented by the New York-based gallery, Foster Goldstrom Fine Arts, she was involved in the artistic and cultural life of the city and she got to know Arthur Penn, with whom she collaborated in 1993 on his film The Portrait.

Some important exhibitions held in New York were Body Works at the Foster Goldstrom Gallery in 1983. The same year he participated in the Body Works & Evocative Recollections at the Keith Green Gallery. In 1984 he had his work exhibited at the inauguration of the Trump Tower.

==== Body Works ====
In the late '80s and early '90s, Marchant created a photographic series of Body Works, where naked bodies constitute a denunciation of the hedonistic and alienating practices to which the female form is submitted, a denunciation of the repression and mystification to which women's education exposes them from every direction. And they are an affirmation of the real sensuality of women, which respectability nonetheless still attempts to hide or to repress (the curtain or the mosquito net). And so, like gallery owner Romana Loda, we can quote Hugo Von Hofmannsthal when he said: "The profound should be hidden. Where? On the surface."

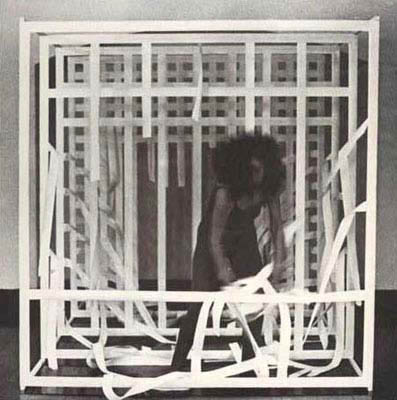
Gretta Sarfaty,1980. Gretta & Becheroni. Performance.

==== Gretta & Becheroni: Change and Appropriation of an Autonomous Identity ====
Video (Note: The video is "Change and Appropriation of an Autonomous Identity". Youtube. 22 May 2012.) made in 1980 in collaboration with Elvio Becheroni. Marchant perform in a cube made of paper ribbons, making herself a passage through the space. It is a metaphoric way to the new identity. This work evidences the prison of the woman in the society through its voyeuristic aspect, evoking a ritual of liberation. This work was exhibited in the Pinacoteca do Estado de São Paulo and in other countries like Argentina, Italy and the USA. Video Gretta & Becheroni: Change and Appropriation of an Autonomous Identity, 1980.

==== Goya Time ====
Inter-disciplinary multimedia event with 100 artists, curated by Marchant, Sandro Dernini, and Butch Morris. Marchant wrote a script and directed this art opera inspired by Francisco de Goya's artworks. The performance took place in 1985, in "Quando", church and a car park at the Lower East Side, New York. (Note: The video is Sarfaty, Gretta (10 July 2012). "Goya Time". YouTube.) Vídeo La Maja, Goya Time, 1985.

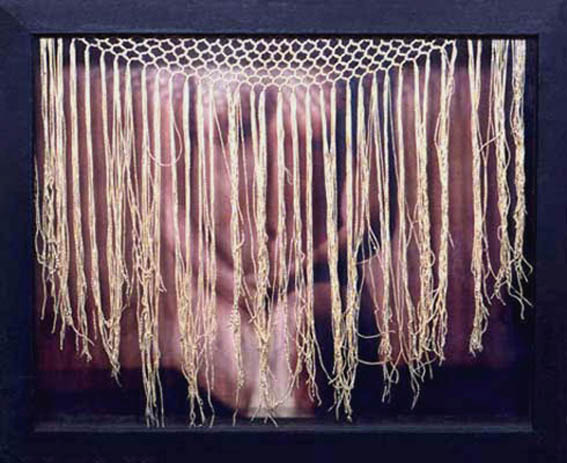
Gretta Sarfaty 1988/2013. Virtual Body Works V, Computer print-out and collage in a box, 27 x 33cm

==== Virtual Body Works 1988/2013 ====
During the spring of 1987, Marchant was invited to participate in an interactive telecommunications event, Who Killed Heinrich Hertz?, (Note: The video is InterComm (10 December 2012). "Who Killed Heinrich Hertz?". Youtube. Archived from the original on 15 December 2021.) created by InterComm (Timothy Binkley, George M. Chaikin, Ira Schneider and Willoughby Sharp). She became involved in collaborative work with each of the above video artist. In 1988 Ira Schneider created a video dedicated to Marchant. (Note: The video is Schneider, Ira (15 March 2013). "Gretta (1988)". Youtube. Archived from the original on 15 December 2021.)

==== Myth ====
Video (Note: The video is Sarfaty, Gretta (30 April 2012). "Myth". Youtube. Archived from the original on 15 December 2021.) produced by Denny Daniel, in 2003. It is a compilation of snapshots of Marchant, manipulated with a kaleidoscopic effect and juxtaposed with scenes from Marchant's everyday life. The structure of the movie remains the style of music videos from the late 80s.

=== London ===
In 1995, she moved to London and married Richard Marchant, "the leading Oriental ceramics dealer". She continued creating photography related to questions of femininity and identity and was represented for the gallery Wolseley Fine Arts. From 2005, he founded his own artist-run gallery, Sartorial Contemporary Arts, a gallery designed to promote exhibitions of young artists as well as his own.

==== Reflections of a Woman ====
Woman as a central artistic subject appears not only in her auto-portraits but also in the series of paintings dedicated to an issue of female identity and body, Reflections of a Woman (1997). It was exhibited in the Wolseley Fine Arts, London, in 1997.

In this series of paintings Gretta is talking not only about herself, but also about other women. She has found a way to represent women's nature. It is not her body any more, but every woman's body. They can still be self-portraits, but they also are portraits of the women of today, full of confidence about their own identity and conscious of their power.

==== Myth of Womanhood, 2001-2005 ====
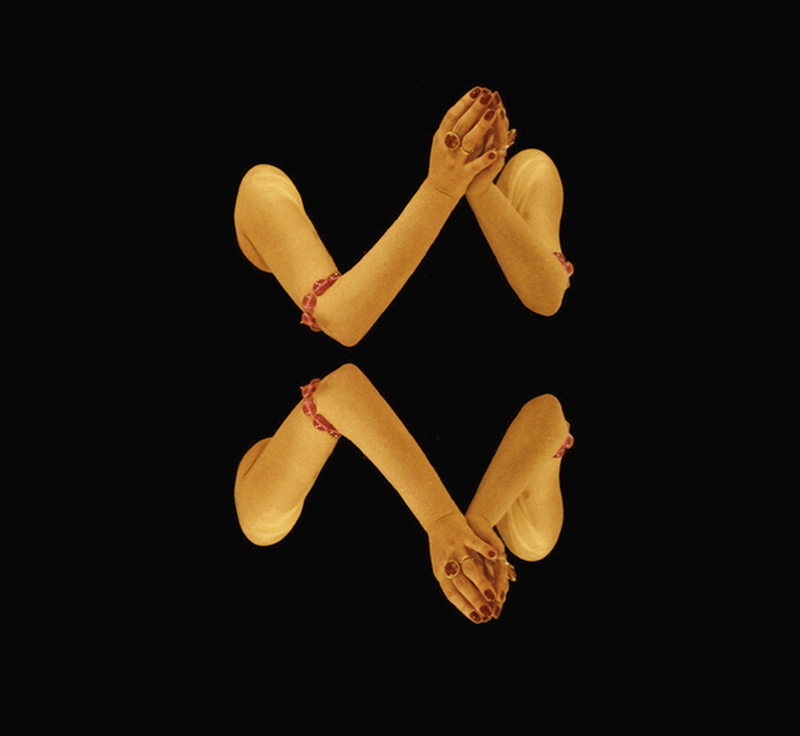
Gretta Sarfaty, 2005. Myth of Womanhood: Crossarms. Photography.

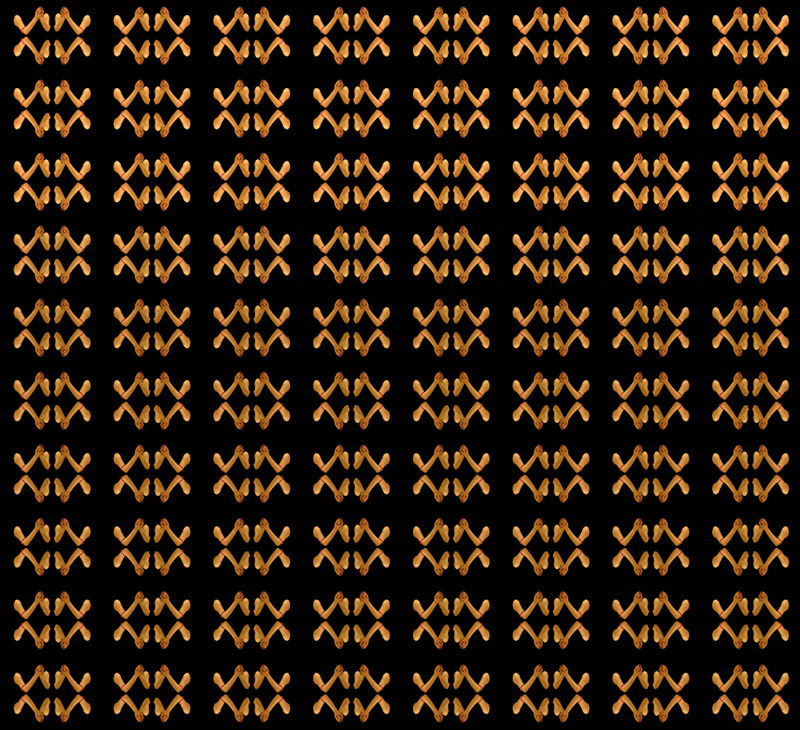
Gretta Sarfaty, 2001–2005. Myth of Womanhood: Crossarms. Photography.

The title itself is a provocative statement by the artist in relation to the Female versus Feminism issue, and how the use and abuse of that subject has now become a cliché. The series consists of one photographic image which is duplicated several times to form a stimulating kaleidoscopic final picture. The Myth of Womanhood marks Gretta's return to performance art, however in this instance the performance is only for the camera.

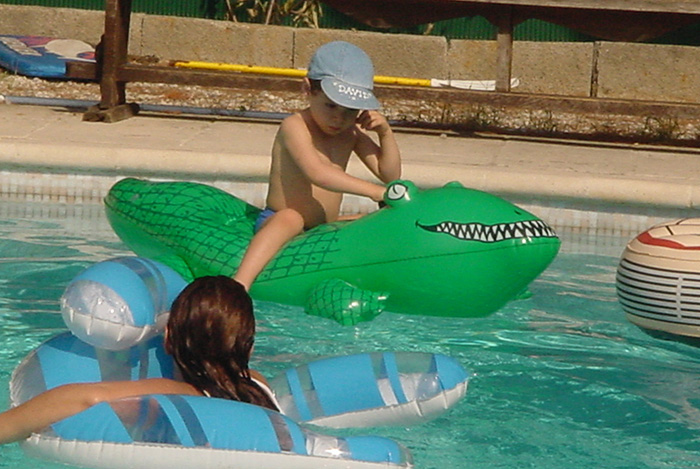
Gretta Sarfaty, 2001–2005. Youth Versus Gravity. Photography.

==== Youth Versus Gravity, 2001-2005 ====
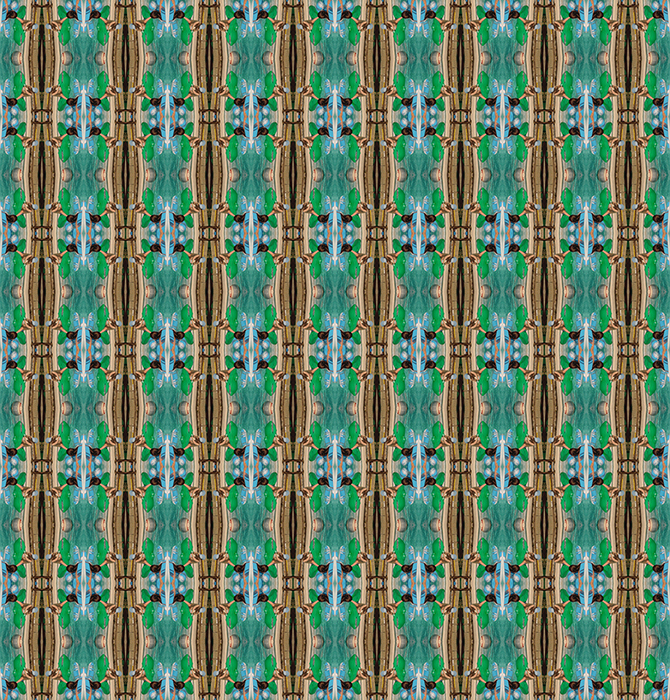
Gretta Sarfaty, 2001-2005 Youth Versus Gravity. Photography.

In this series, Gretta manipulated mirrors and their reflections to have a complete view of the subject from different angles. Separate images were used to create fun compositions through symmetry, which are intended to transport the viewer back to the illusion of childhood. In Youth Versus Gravity, the artist has been guided by issues related to longevity.

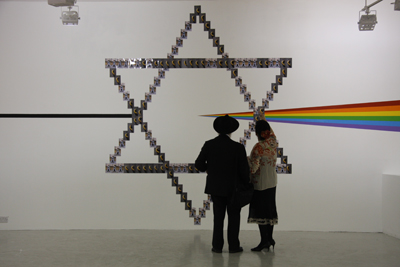
Gretta Sarfaty, 2009. Permutations. Installation.

==== Permutations, 2009 ====
The installation is a cosmological ricochet which is conceptualized through repeated images of bananas, self portraits and geometric exegesis in ordered sequences in front of a symbol of the Shield of David. Here Gretta is interested in synchronicity and meaningful coincidences.

=== Recent activity ===
In 2005, she opened her own gallery, Sartorial Contemporary Art. In October 2008, this moved to a larger space in Kings Cross. Marchant has curated several of its shows including Notting Heaven (2008), Mothers (2008), Remember My Name (2008), Burning Candy (2008), Obsession (2006) and Water (2006). Along with Jasper Joffe and Harry Pye she has been a co-editor of The Rebel magazine.

In 2010, she exhibited in the show Bad Girls, together with Marina Abramović, Annette Messager, Orlan and Gina Pane. The concept of the exhibition was to compare four generations of female artists since the 70s. In 2011, her works were shown in an exhibition at the Pinacoteca do Estado de São Paulo, Arte como registro, registro como arte, documenting the history of art performance in Brazil. The show highlights Marchant as one of the few Brazilian artists to have ever exhibited at the Centre Georges Pompidou. One year later she participated in Foto/Gráfica – a New History of the Latin-American Photobook (where she exhibited her Auto-Photos), at Le Bal, Paris and Libriste – Dalla collezione di libri d'artista di Marco Carminati: Gretta Sarfaty & Elvio Becheroni . Modificazione e appropriamento di una identita autonoma at the Instituzione Biblioteca Classense in Ravenna, Italy. In 2013, she had works exhibited in the show Ainda: O livro como Performance curated by Amir Brito Cadôr at the Museu de Arte da Pampulha in Belo Horizonte, Brazil. In 2015, she participated in the exhibition Reenactment: Videoarte at the Palazzo Dei Diamanti, Ferrara, Italy.

In 2018, the Museu de Arte Moderna de São Paulo (MAM) celebrated its 70th anniversary in partnership with the Museu de Arte Contemporânea (MAC) in which Gretta's work Auto-Photos were exhibited. The same year, she opened her solo exhibition Reconciliation at Galeria Pilar in São Paulo, her first solo show in Brazil after returning from abroad in New York and London. The exhibition featured painting, video art, engraving and photography.

In 2019, Gretta starts to be represented by Central Galeria, opening the exhibition "Dos nossos espaços vazios internos˜, which brings together vintage works, produced between the years 1970 and 1980, from the series Body Works, Metamorphic Recollections and Diário de uma mulher. In December 2019, Gretta opened the exhibition Reconciliações at the Instituto dos Arquitetos do Brasil, a project contemplated by the Cultural Incentive Law - Lei Rouanet. Gretta also participated in the group exhibition "Estratégias do Feminino" at Farol Santander in Porto Alegre, the show brings together about 95 works by 53 female artists, produced between the beginning of the 20th century and up to the present day.

Also in 2019, Gretta started to be represented by an international gallery, Galeria Nuno Centeno, located in Porto, Portugal. In 2020, Gretta participated in a solo exhibition at the gallery in May.

=== Curating art ===
Marchant curated almost all exhibitions organised in the Sartorial Contemporary Art gallery, which she run for eight years (2005–2013).

== Bibliography ==
- ARTE Global 77. São Paulo: Galeria ARTE Global, 1977., il. p.b. SPgag 1977
- Burning Candy (catátogo), Leeds College of Art and Design, Leeds, 2008.
- CADÔR, Amir. Ainda, o livro como performance. Catálogo da exposição no Museu de Arte da Pampulha, Brasil, 2013.
- Catalogue of the Exhibition MAM 70, 1948–2018. Museu de Arte Moderna de São Paulo, 2018.
- CALLINGS, Matthew. Modern Painters, London, 2006, pp. 34–35.
- CANDELA, Alessandra Gagliano. Bad Girls: good girls go to heaven, bad girls go everywhere, in: Art Key. Magazine d'Arte Moderna e Contemporanea, 2010.
- DINAMBRO, Nadiesda. Imagens de Gretta Sarfaty: Fotografia, Performance e Gênero. Dissertação de Mestrado, 2018
- DORFLES, GILLO. Ultime Tendenze nell'Arte d'Oggi, Dall'informale al neo-oggettuale, Milano, 2004.
- DORFLES, GILLO. Texto La Body Art In: revista L'Arte Moderna, número 112.
- DUNCAN, Catarina. Dos nossos espaços vazios internos. Texto para exposição de mesmo nome na Central Galeria, 2019.
- FERNANDEZ, Horacio. Fotolivros Latino-Americanos, Cosac Naify, São Paulo, 2011
- "FÓTO/GRAFICA" A New History of the Latin-American Photobook, LensCulture, 31 January 2012.
- GANHITO, Lidia Cesaro Penha. O corpo também é um lugar: Narrativas de subjetividade em Gretta Sarfaty, 2019.
- GRETTA & BACHERONI. Modificazione e Appropriamento di una identità autonoma (catálogo), Prearo Editore, 1980.
- Gretta Marchant: "Life Works", in: New York Arts Magazine, Vol. 8, February 2003.
- Gretta . In: ENCICLOPÉDIA Itaú Cultural de Arte e Cultura Brasileiras. São Paulo: Itaú Cultural, 2018. Accesso em: 16 de Abr. 2018. Verbete da Enciclopédia. ISBN 978-85-7979-060-7
- GRETTA. Auto-retrato do Brasil: retratos e depoimentos de 50 personagens. Tradução Bibiana Marie Anna Rys; tradução Nancy Cristina Martorana, Elvio Becheroni, Patrizia Olivieri; apresentação Sabina de Libman; fotografia Romulo Fialdini. São Paulo: Arte aplicada, 1983. 147 p., il.
- GRETTA. Europa, França & Bahia. São Paulo: MIS : Paço das Artes, 1988. 16 p., il. p&b. color.
- GRETTA. Gretta Sarfaty: Soho scenes: desenhos e pinturas. São Paulo: Renato Magalhães Gouvêa Escritório de Arte, 1993., il. p&b. color., fot. G834 1993.
- GUIMARÃES, Andréa Camargo... (et al.) Cronologia de artes plásticas : referências 1975-1995 – São Paulo : Centro Cultural São Paulo-IDART, 2010.
- KLINTOWITZ, Jacob. Uma viagem pelo ego de Gretta Sarfaty. Jornal da Tarde, São Paulo, 14 March 1988. Não catalogado
- LODA, Romana. Gretta: um tentativo de amor. Galleria Multimedia (Brescia), 1981.
- MAGALHÃES, Fabio. Ousadias, afetos e memórias. Texto para exposição e catálogo Reconciliações no IAB – Instituto dos Arquitetos do Brasil, 2020.
- Marco Carminati, Dino Silvestroni, Marta Zocchi, Libriste dalla Collezione di Libri d'Artista di Marco Carminati, introduction by: Ada de Pirro, Instituzione Biblioteca Classense, Ravenna, March 2012.
- Mike Higgins, Gretta: Reflections of a Woman, in: Independent Newspaper London, December 1997.
- PANORAMA DE ARTE ATUAL BRASILEIRA, São Paulo, 1976. Pintura. Apresentação de Paulo Mendes de Almeida. São Paulo: MAM, 1976.
- SILVEIRA, Paulo. A página violada, da ternura à injúria na construção do livro de artista. Editora da UFRGS, Porto Alegre, RS, Brasil, 2008.
- POÉTICAS visuais. Apresentação de Walter Zanini. Texto de Júlio Plaza. São Paulo: MAC/USP, 1977.
- Mini-doc em 3 partes sobre a trajetória de Gretta Sarfaty: Gretta's Progress I; Gretta's Progress II; Gretta's Progress III.
- Exhibition Catalogue MAM and MAC: 70 Years.
- TRIZOLI, Talita. Atravessamentos feministas: Um panorama de mulheres artistas no Brasil dos anos 60/70. Tese de Doutorado, 2018.
- TRIZOLI, Talita. A través de um espejo: subjetivaciones femeninas en el arte brasileño de los años setenta. Revista Errata#17, Colombia, 2017.
- VERZOTTI, Giorgio. Gretta / Diagramma. Magazine G7 Studio. Itália, (Abril, 1979)
