= Fever Zine =

Fever Zine Issue 1 cover

Fever Zine was a quarterly zine based in London, United Kingdom.

Its contents focus mainly on music, art, DIY culture, trends and e-culture, with fashion, music videos and other zines also featuring heavily.

The zine was created, and is edited, by British music and arts journalist Alex Zamora with design by graphic designer Simon Whybray.

According to its MySpace profile the publication is available at a variety of cultural hotspots in London such as the Institute of Contemporary Arts, as well as around the United Kingdom.

== Appearance ==
Printed in black and white on A4 paper, its front and back covers are pink while the inside pages are white. It uses distinctive hand-drawn typography on its cover and on its article titles.

In an interview with Italian magazine Beautiful Freaks, it was revealed that Issue 1's cover was purposefully left blank, with only the logo present. According to Zamora this was done to establish the zine's logo and identity with readers and maintain curiosity about its content.

The cover of Issue 2 was drawn by acclaimed British illustrator Andy Council and is based on the Spinosaurus from the movie Jurassic Park 3. According to his website, Council has nicknamed it "Feversaurus".

== Content and contributors ==
Fever Zine contains original writing, photography and illustration by a variety of contributors, all of whom are listed on its MySpace profile.

According to an article in the November 2007 issue of Grafik magazine, its contributors are wholly drawn from MySpace and range from art students to creative professionals, from the U.K, Europe and the rest of the world.

Interviews in Issue 1 include Hot Club De Paris and Get Cape. Wear Cape. Fly.

Issue 2 interviews include Pop Levi, Ladytron and acclaimed music video director Nima Nourizadeh.

Issue 3 features interviews with Sarah McCrory of independent publishing fair Publish And Be Damned, RESFest founder Jonathan Wells, Pancake Mountain creator Scott Stuckey and Liverpool band To My Boy.

== Press coverage ==
Fever Zine has newspaper, magazine and online coverage, most of which concentrates on the publication's content and especially on its use of social networking.

In an article published on the Media section of The Guardian website on 7 January 2008, journalist Jemima Kiss detailed a report highlighting individuals and entities in the creative industries with strong followings on MySpace, singling out Fever Zine for its unique use of social networking;

"The underground, hand-photocopied magazine Fever Zine coordinates contributors and subscribers through its MySpace page.

Fever Zine has 5,000 friends and a cult following; editor Alex Zamora said MySpace was essential to help find the new talent that he wants to feature in the lo-fi publication."

March 2008 saw the zine further championed by leading German culture and arts magazine Lodown in their 60th issue. Picked as the only British publication in their print review section, Fever Zine was lauded as offering up "healthy brainfood" for its readers.

An online interview with Zamora for Swindle Magazine by editor Anne Keehn, posted on 19 March 2007, revealed MySpace's "seminal" role in the zine's success:

"The Internet, and MySpace in particular, played a seminal role, allowing us to disseminate images, stockist information and of course sell the zine online. Quite simply without it there’d be no Fever Zine."

== Issues ==
Issue 1 was first published in early 2007 and, according to the Grafik article, created using Microsoft Word, a scanner, a fineliner and Adobe Photoshop while Issue 2, designed by Whybray, was created using Adobe InDesign.

Issue 2 was featured in an article by journalist Helen Sumpter in Time Out London on the 23rd of July. It was picked as one of the zines to look out for at 2007's Publish And Be Damned independent publishing fair.

Issue 3 debuted at the London Zine Symposium 2008 on 27 April.

Issue 5 is due to be released in 2014.

== Events ==
Fever Zine took part in 2008's London Zine Symposium at East London's Rag Factory venue on 27 April. This followed its participation at the previous year's event which took place on 21 April at the Horse Hospital in Bloomsbury, London.

According to independent publishing fair Publish And Be Damned's website, the publication took part in the 2007 fair in London on 29 July and is due to return on 3 August for 2008's event.

Fever Zine also took part in the 2008 V&A Village Fete at the Victoria & Albert Museum in London on 25 and 26 July.
