= Martino Gamper =

Italian designer based in London (born 1971)

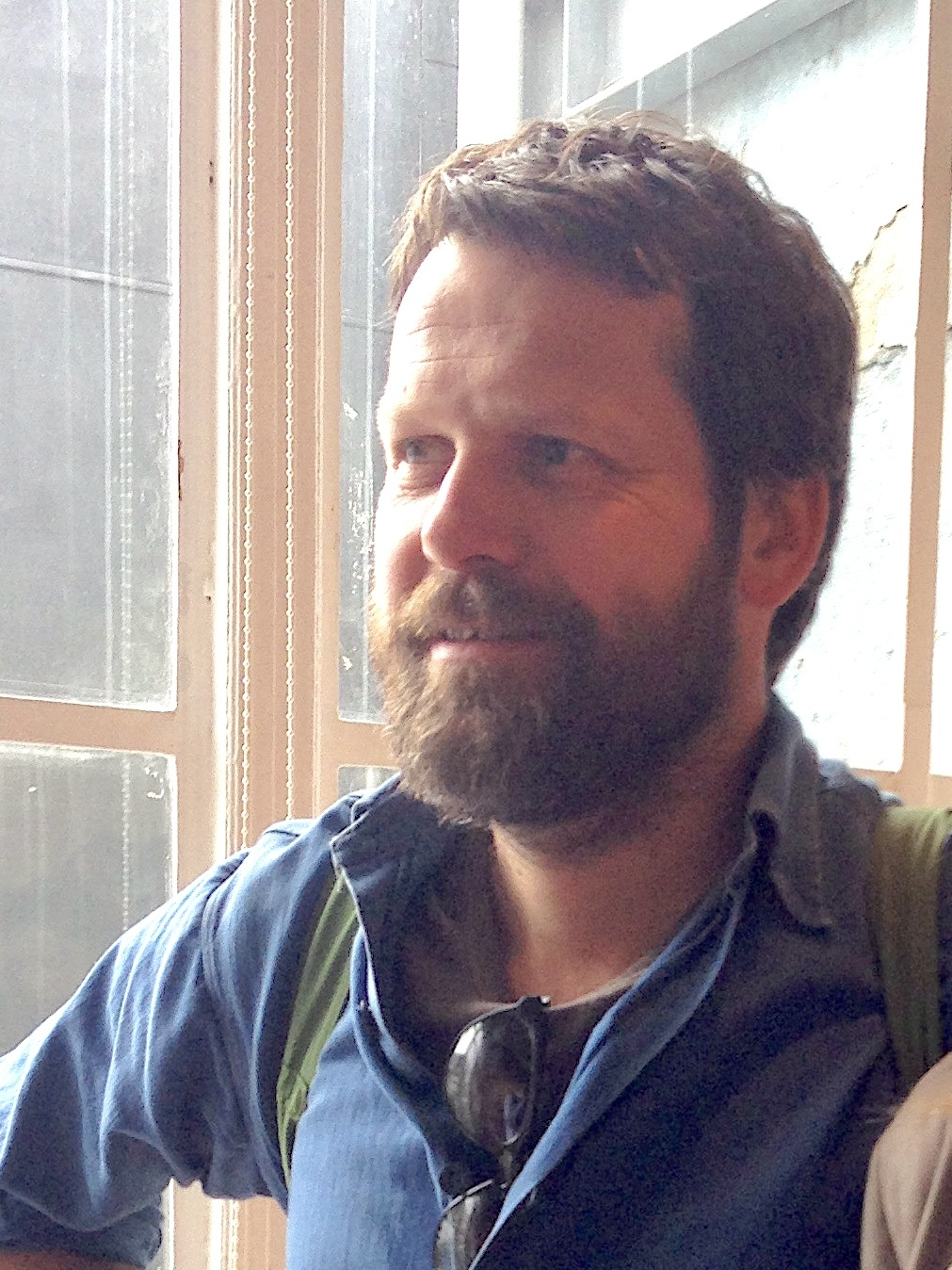
Martino Gamper in 2014

Martino Gamper OBE (born 1971 in Merano, Italy) is an Italian-born designer based in London who became internationally regarded through his project 100 Chairs in 100 Days. This group of works was exhibited in 2007 in London, the Milan Triennial in 2009, and at YBCA in San Francisco in 2010. It has also been published by Dent-de-Leone as a book (100 Chairs in 100 Days and its 100 Ways), republished as a pocket book. The 100 Chairs project has been described by Gamper as "3D Drawing", and is typical of Gamper's practice in that it shows disregard for the historic design standards of harmony and symmetry. Gamper has stated "There is no perfect chair".

He was appointed Officer of the Order of the British Empire (OBE) in the 2023 Birthday Honours for services to design.

Gamper has taught at the Royal College of Art in London. He took his MA at the Royal College of Art in 2000, studying under Ron Arad.

== Personal life ==
Gamper is married to the sculptor Francis Upritchard.

== Exhibitions ==
Gamper has exhibited extensively both in the UK and internationally, including a chair arch of Ercol chairs for the London Design Festival at the V&A in September 2009, the British Council exhibition Get It Louder in Beijing, Shanghai and Guangzhou, Autoprogettazione Revisited: Easy-to-assemble Furniture at the Architectural Association, London, in October 2009, and designed the exhibition Super Contemporary at the Design Museum, London, in 2009.

- 2014: Martino Gamper/Design Is a State of Mind, Serpentine Sackler Gallery, London, later Museion, Bolzano.
- 2025: Gamper Mollino Chair No. 20 and Stool 7 included in Pirouette: Turning Points in Design, at the Museum of Modern Art, New York. The museum also added these pieces to its architecture and design collection.

== Publications ==
- "100 Chairs in 100 Days and its 100 Ways", published by Dent-de-Leone, designed by Åbäke, ISBN 978-0-9557098-1-4
- "Piccolo Volume II", published by Nilufar & Dent-De-Leone, designed by Åbäke, ISBN 978-0-9561885-1-9
