= Free Art Fair =

The Free Art Fair was an exhibition of contemporary artworks and performance art in London in 2007, 2008, and 2009. Each fair culminated with all the artworks being given away at the end. Jasper Joffe, the founder, claims he set up the fair to "do something different from what everyone else is doing at this time of year and non-commercial, and something that excites people and values art, not selling."

== Background ==
In 2007, Jasper Joffe set up the first Free Art Fair with the participation of 25 artists, all giving their art away for free in three empty shop spaces in Portman Village, near Marble Arch, London. It was described as the "most radical departure from art fair commercialism" that year. Taking place in October at the same time as the Frieze Art Fair it was written about as an alternative asking questions of the market-driven art fairs.

In 2008, the fair took place again near Marble Arch. It was reported that £100,000 of art was given away, with people queuing up for two nights to get artwork by artists including Gavin Turk and Stella Vine.

In 2009, the fair moved to the Barbican Centre. Fifty artists participated, including Marlene Dumas, one of the world's most expensive female artists by auction results at the time.

=== 2007 ===
Participating artists: Artists Anonymous, Centre of Attention, Matthew Collings, Stuart Cumberland, Stephen Farthing, Rose Gibbs, Alex Hamilton, Peter Harris, Saron Hughes, Lee Johnson, Chantal Joffe, Jasper Joffe, Peter Lamb, Cathy Lomax, Amanda Loomes, Bruce McLean, Stephen Nelson, House of O’Dwyer, Harry Pye, Danny Rolph, Bob & Roberta Smith, Terry Smith, Markus Vater, Edward Ward, Michael Ward.

=== 2008 ===
Participating artists Artists Anonymous, Centre of Attention, Matthew Collings, Jimmy Conway-Dyer, Sacha Craddock, Stuart Cumberland, Adam Dant, Stephen Farthing, Rose Gibbs, Luke Gottelier, Alex Hamilton, Peter Harris, Pablo Helguera, Saron Hughes, Lee Johnson, Sayshun Jay, James Jessop, Chantal Joffe, Jasper Joffe, Peter Lamb, Cathy Lomax, Amanda Loomes, Marta Marce, Bruce McLean, Alex Gene Morrison, Stephen Nelson, House of O’Dwyer, Harry Pye, Danny Rolph, Martin Sexton, Bob & Roberta Smith, Terry Smith, Geraldine Swayne, Chris Tosic, Gavin Turk, Markus Vater, Stella Vine, Michael Ward, Douglas White, Charlie Woolley. With performances by: Laura Wilson, Frog Morris, Lee Campbell, Mark Dean Quinn, Dora Wade, Adrian Lee, Jenny Baines, Rebecca Birch, Calum F.Kerr, Jordan McKenzie, Charlotte Young, Victori Melody, Alex Staiger, Peter Bond, Sarah Turner, Daniel Lehan.

=== 2009 ===
Participating artists: Artists Anonymous, Phil Ashcroft, Centre of Attention, Maria Chevska, Matthew Collings, Jimmy Conway-Dyer Sacha Craddock, Stuart Cumberland, Adam Dant, Marlene Dumas, Stephen Farthing, Rose Finn-Kelcey, Jaime Gili, Rose Gibbs, Alex Hamilton, Peter Harris, Pablo Helguera, Russell Herron, James Howard, Catrin Huber, Saron Hughes, Lee Johnson, Sayshun Jay, James Jessop, Jasper Joffe, Sonia Khurana, Peter Lamb, Cathy Lomax, Amanda Loomes, Robin Mason, Bruce McLean, Hugh Mendes, Alex Gene Morrison, Chloe Mortimer, Stephen Nelson, House of O’Dwyer, Henrik Potter, Harry Pye, Danny Rolph, Martin Sexton, Bob & Roberta Smith, Terry Smith, Eva Stenram, Matthew Stone, Geraldine Swayne, Chris Tosic, Josef O'Connor, Markus Vater, Edward Ward, Michael Ward, Douglas White, Charlie Woolley. Performance Art curated by Lee Campbell and Frog Morris.
