= Emma Biggs =

British artist

Emma Biggs (born 1956) is a London-based mosaic artist and author of a number of standard textbooks on contemporary mosaic practice. Having completed the large public art project, "Made in England", based on the visual culture and ideology of the pottery industry in Stoke-on-Trent (in the English Midlands), her work became increasingly concerned with the ceramic industry and its social history.

As a fine artist Emma Biggs makes abstract paintings with her husband, the art-critic and artist Matthew Collings.

== Career ==
The processes, formats and titles of her paintings relate to her interest in material culture. She has written Mosaic Techniques (Cassell, 2003) and several other books co-authored with Tessa Hunkin, who joined her after she founded the London-based Mosaic Workshop in 1988. Mosaic Workshop have been responsible for a number of high-profile commissions including work for some of the chapels in London's Westminster Cathedral. She is a regular tutor of short courses in mosaic art at West Dean College, the study centre of the Edward James Foundation. She also lectures at City and Guilds of London Art School.

== Books ==
- Mosaic Techniques, Cassel, 1999

=== with Tessa Hunkin ===
- Stylish and Simple Mosaic, Aurum Press, 1998
- Mosaic Workshop, David & Charles, 1999
- Mosaics for the Home and Garden, David & Charles, 2001
- The Complete Book of Mosaics, Reader's Digest Association, 2005
- Mosaic Patterns, New Holland, 2006
- Garden Mosaics, New Holland, 2009

== Artworks exhibited at Canary Wharf Art Trail, London ==
- Emma Biggs: Pattern for Democracy Canary Wharf Art Trail. Canary Wharf Group. Retrieved 21 February 2023.
- Emma Biggs: Sartor Resartus Canary Wharf Art Trail. Canary Wharf Group. Retrieved 21 February 2023.
- Emma Biggs: Wharf Walk Canary Wharf Art Trail. Canary Wharf Group. Retrieved 21 February 2023.
