= Nathan Penlington =

British poet and writer

- Occupation: Poet

Nathan Penlington (born in Rhyl, North Wales), is a writer, poet, live literature producer and magician. His work has appeared on stage, in print and on the radio.

== Career ==
Nathan Penlington currently performs at venues and festivals across the UK, Europe and the US, sharing stages with performers such as John Cooper Clarke, Ricky Gervais and Phill Jupitus. His performances fuse comedy, storytelling and magic with writing that led Robert Newman to describe him as "a natural performer, witty, inventive, stylish and original", and Time Out to comment, "Nathan Penlington's fusion of wit, storytelling and visuals are [sic] garnering critics' plaudits and attention."

Penlington was co-organiser and resident host of London's weekly spoken word venue Shortfuse, from April 2000 to September 2007, with its reputation for an eclectic fusion of stand-up poetry, performance comedy and music, and presenting up-and-coming performers alongside established names such as John Hegley, Stewart Lee, Kevin Eldon and Simon Munnery, while forging links with performers across the US, Canada and Europe. Shortfuse became renowned for new formats, including Bards in their Eyes, Speed Cabaret, and Poetry Idol. The tongue-in-cheek Poetry Idol helped many up-and-coming poets and performers, including Scroobius Pip, Stephen Howarth, Suzanne Andrade, Joshua Idehen and Musa Okwanga.

Penlington has produced and hosted events for various festivals, including the Edinburgh International Film Festival, Brick Lane, Stoke Newington, and Whitstable Arts Biennale. Through September 2007 he was Festival Director for Write to Ignite – Hackney Word Festival.

In 2005, Penlington gave his début full-length, solo spoken-word show If My Life Hadn't Turned Out Differently at the Edinburgh Festival Fringe at the Pleasance, after previewing it at Chicago's Drinking & Writing Festival, and in various New York venues, including the Bowery Poetry Club. The following year he made his fifth consecutive appearance at the festival, teaming up with two other spoken-word artists, Rhian Edwards and Suzanne Andrade, for a show called Invisible Ink, which fused magic, music, poetry and animation.

Penlington's next show – Uri & Me, an obsessive deconstruction of the spoon bending cultural icon Uri Geller – was described as "a thoughtfully constructed, funny, yet litigation avoiding look at the life and work of a global celebrity phenomenon" by the Londonist. A combination of stand-up, magic and spoken word, it premièred on commission at the London Word Festival in March 2010. It was also shown at the Camden Fringe, The Roundhouse, the Brighton Comedy Festival, the Oxford Literary Festival, Bristol Old Vic, and the Edinburgh Fringe 2011 at The Underbelly. The reviews included a four-star welcome in The Scotsman by Kate Copstick: "The best shows are driven by a personal passion". The show was twice attended by Geller.

In 2013 Penlington started work on Choose Your Own Documentary which is inspired by the Choose Your Own Adventure phenomenon of the 1980s combining film, stand-up, and storytelling the show allows the audience to interact with the performance by using wireless remote controls to decide what happens next. With over 1500 permutations each performance is unique. The show was co-commissioned by the Southbank Centre, and supported by Arts Council England.

His work has been broadcast on BBC Radio 3's The Verb, performing a work of 'predictive text poetry – a new creative form using the mobile phone'. He has also appeared on BBC Radio 4's 28 Acts in 28 Minutes, and he has hosted three series of the surreal spoken word show Parlour Games on Resonance FM.

== Published works ==
April 2008 saw the publication of his Almost Nearly, a full-length collection of graphic poems in a limited signed and numbered edition. It features some of the poems included in Roadkill on the Digital Highway, which was short-listed for the Eric Gregory Award 2005.

Penlington's written work has appeared in publications as diverse as Peaches Geldof's magazine Disappear Here, The Journal of Experimental Fiction, and it has been translated into Serbian for Treći Trg. He has recently featured in the Penned in the Margins anthology of experimental poetry Adventures in Form, and in publications such as Rising, The Fix, Quiet Feather, Litmus, The Delinquent, Aesthetica magazine, The Rebel magazine, and X-Magazine. Penlington was Poetry Editor for The Fix Magazine, the UK's only monthly comedy magazine, which was distributed free at comedy venues across the country.

In 2014, Penlington published The Boy in the Book, a memoir of his experiences in tracing the seemingly suicidal former owner of some second-hand books. The work includes interviews with philologist Irving Finkel.
