= Crimes Town Gallery =

Coordinates: 51.5624°N 0.0796°W

The Crimes Town Gallery in Stoke Newington ran between July 2007 and March 2010. The gallery was run by Gav Toye and Ben Newton who are both artists. It existed in the Sea Cadets building on Stoke Newington High St. In May 2008 Toye and Newton staged "Walpurgisnacht" at their gallery, a group show featuring artists such as Cathy Lomax, James Unsworth and Sarah Sparkes. Walpurgisnacht is traditionally the biggest Witches Sabbath of the year, the time when the forces of the supernatural meet with the mortal world. This show was previewed in the Guardian Guide by Jessica Lack.

In June 2008 guest curator Harry Pye organised a group show called, "Poetic Licence". This exhibition featured sixteen artists including John Moseley, Barry Thompson, and Edward Ward. Each of the show's contributors made a painting or drawing that was inspired by their love of a favourite poem.
