= Museion (Bolzano) =

Art museum in Bolzano, Italy

- Museum für moderne und zeitgenössische Kunst Bozen—Museo d’arte contemporanea di Bolzano
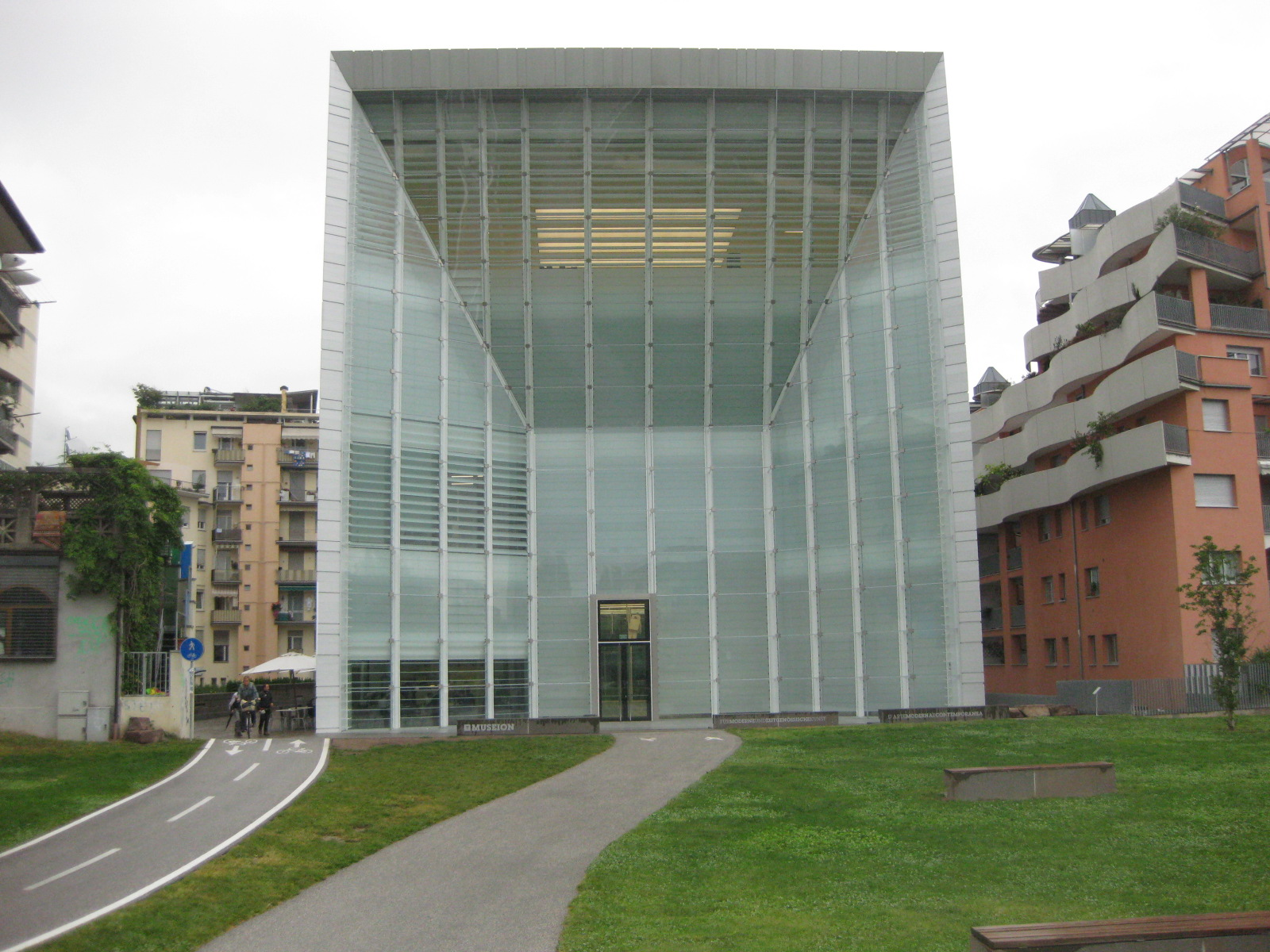
- Facade of the Museion facing the Talfer River in Bolzano
- Established: 1985
- Location: Bolzano, South Tyrol, Italy
- Coordinates: 46.4974°N 11.3484°E
- Type: Modern and contemporary art
- Collection size: 4500
- Founders: Autonomous Province Bozen and the Museion Association
- Managed by: Museion Foundation
- Website: www.museion.it

The Museion (from the greek μουσείον, meaning the temple of the muses) is the Museum of Modern and Contemporary Art of Bolzano, in South Tyrol, Italy.

It was founded in 1985. Since 2006 it has been managed by the Museion Foundation, founded by the Autonomous Province Bozen and the Museion Association. On 24 May 2008 the Museion opened to the public its new venue, built by the KSV - Krüger Schuberth Vandreike architects in the center of Bolzano.

== Collections ==
The Museion currently holds 4500 works of art, both from international and local artists, which are exhibited according to a theme-based rotation. Acquisitions often are made after temporary exhibitions. The displays of works of art in the collection are curated also by artists. In recent years most acquisitions by the Museion have come from exhibitions on contemporary sculpture, and particularly by artists that conceive sculpture as a way to establish relationships between objects and spaces. During the opening of an exhibition by the American sculptor Carl Andre, the then director of the Museion Letizia Ragaglia has declared: "The sculptures by Carl Andre are not objects meant to be contemplated, but a place to live in, where you can move, have experiences, and establish relationships through physical contact."

== Main venue ==
The main building of the Museion is a rectangular prism measuring 54 metres long, 25 metres high and 23 metres wide, with transparent front and rear façades. The building is a physical and symbolic link between the two parts of the city of Bozen.

== Other venues ==
Created in 2003, the Piccolo Museion – Cubo Garutti is a work by Alberto Garutti. Located in Via Sassari 17b, it functions as an outlying venue for Museion in the Don Bosco neighbourhood of Bolzano.

== Library ==
Specialised in modern and contemporary art, Museion's library holds 25,000 volumes, 50 subscriptions to art journals and 400 DVDs.

== Programs, exhibitions and events ==
Since its opening, the Museion has focused its programme on research across diverse forms of artistic expressions, and has tried to develop close relationships with artists. During the years the Museion has produced exhibition on the works of artists such as Sonic Youth, Mike Kelley, Rosemarie Trockel, Carl Andre, Danh Vo, and Martino Gamper.

=== Exhibitions ===
Title	Opening	Closing	Venue	Curated by
Peripheral vision & collective body	24 May 2008	21 September 2008	Museion	Corinne Diserens
Sonic Youth etc.: "SENSATIONAL FIX"	11 October 2008	4 January 2009	Museion	Roland Grönenboom and Corinne Diserens
Mike Kelley – Educational Complex Onwards, 1995–2008	16 January 2009	19 April 2009	Museion	Anne Pontegnie
Carl Andre	17 September 2011	8 January 2012	Museion	Roland Mönig and Letizia Ragaglia
Rosemarie Trockel: "Flagrant Delight"	1 May 2013	12 January 2014	Museion	Dirk Snauwaert
Danh Vo. Fabulous Muscles	18 May 2013	1 September 2014	Museion	Letizia Ragaglia
Klara Lidén. Invalidenstraße	14 September 2013	12 January 2014	Museion	Letizia Ragaglia
When Now is Minimal. The Unknown Side of the Sammlung Goetz	23 November 2013	12 October 2014	Museion	Karsten Löckemann, Angelika Nollert, Letizia Ragaglia
Leander Schwazer. Bikini	21 February 2014	25 May 2014	Museion	
Ceal Floyer	1 February 2014	4 May 2014	Museion	Letizia Ragaglia
Tatiana Trouvé. I Tempi Doppi	24 May 2014	7 September 2014	Museion	Letizia Ragaglia
Rä di Martino. Authentic News of Invisible Things	27 September 2014	11 January 2015	Museion	Frida Carazzato
Soleil politique. The Museum Between Light and Shadow	27 September 2014	11 January 2015	Museion	Pierre Bal-Blanc
Solo Show Robbie Williams	1 November 2014	1 March 2015	Museion	
Carol Bove / Carlo Scarpa	1 November 2014	1 March 2015	Museion	Henry Moore Institute
Nanni Balestrini. Oltre la poesia	15 November 2014	22 February 2015	Museion	Andreas Hapkemeyer
Chiara Fumai. Der Hexenhammer	31 January 2015	26 April 2015	Museion	Frida Carazzato
Rossella Biscotti. The future can only be for ghosts	31 January 2015	25 May 2015	Museion	Frida Carazzato
Collecting for Tomorrow: new works at Museion	21 March 2015	10 January 2016	Museion	
Martino Gamper. Design is a State of Mind	6 June 2015	13 September 2015	Museion	Martino Gamper
Maurizio Nannucci. Top Hundred	18 September 2015	6 January 2016	Museion	Andreas Hapkemeyer
Cerith Wyn Evans	3 October 2015	10 January 2016	Museion	Letizia Ragaglia
Marinella Senatore. Jammin' Drama Project	24 November 2015	13 December 2015	Museion	
Francesco Vezzoli. MUSEO MUSEION	30 January 2016	6 November 2016	Museion	Francesco Vezzoli
Korakrit Arunanodchai	2 June 2016	11 September 2016	Museion	
Judith Hopf	1 October 2016	8 January 2017	Museion	
Lili Reynaud-Dewar	28 January 2017	5 May 2017	Museion	
Irma Blank	16 November 2017	23 September 2018	Museion	
Martin Kippenberger, Maria Lassnig. BODY CHECK	3 February 2018	6 May 2018	Museion	
Diego Marcon	10 April 2018	6 May 2018	Museion	
John Armleder	22 September 2018	6 January 2019	Museion	

== Criticism ==
Right after the opening of the Museion's new venue, in May 2008, the first exhibition had on display, among others, the work "Zuerst die Füße" by the German artist Martin Kippenberger. That work, conceived as a 'portrait' by the artist in 1990, depicts a crucified frog holding a beer in one hand and an egg in the other. According to the Museion, the sculpture has "nothing to do with religion, and represents instead the inner world of the artist himself following a difficult rehabilitation process from drugs and alcohol abuse." During a visit by the Pope some regional politicians declared that the sculpture should be taken down. Sandro Bondi, then Ministry of Cultural Heritage and Activities and Tourism declared that the sculpture was "also an offense to common sense".
