= Publish and Be Damned =

Former publishing fair in London

Publish And Be Damned was an annual independent publishing fair that was held in 2004–2013 in London. The fair showcased self-published work and works form publishers "outside the mainstream."

Its name comes from the retort of Arthur Wellesley, 1st Duke of Wellington, on being blackmailed by John Joseph Stockdale and Harriette Wilson.

== Origin ==
Publish And Be Damned was first held in 2004 and curated by Emily Pethick and Kit Hammonds. The fair offered an opportunity for writers "to forego the purgatory of the slush pile and self-publish instead."

The first fair, in 2004, and the 2005 fair were held in the crypt of a St. James Church in Clerkenwell as one-day events. According to Artforum, "the lively selection of independent printing presses and laptop upstarts, ranging from Amsterdam's DOT DOT DOT to Zurich's WeAreTheArtists, generated a tremendous energy which spilled into the pubs for the evening and then into the hearts, minds, and bookshelves of those with a few pounds to spare."

Sarah McCrory organised the 2006 and 2007 editions of the publishing fair, moving it to Rochelle School in Shoreditch.

Over the years the project was run by Kit Hammonds, Sarah McCrory, Joe Scotland, Louise O’Hare and Kate Phillimore. The last fair was at the ICA in 2013. Hammonds, O'Hare and Phillimore declared the fair dead in November 2014.

== Event ==
The selected publishers were allocated tables where they could display their work and sell from. The number of publishers varied each year. The event expanded in size and attendance from 2004.

== Publications ==
The types of publication featured each year included everything from zines and self-published books to newsprint titles and glossy magazines, all of which are independently published. Some titles were free whilst most were sold. It showcased "books and periodicals that span a wide range, from black-and-white folded A3 sheets and hand-drawn fanzines to intriguing one-off designs and sumptuous magazines. It's an eclectic and idiosyncratic collection that recreates the energy, enthusiasm and fan-like dedication of the original punk publishing phenomenon.

Eligibility was decided by a panel made up of the founders and invited guests curators.

An open call for submissions was announced in early spring each year, with details on how to submit publications are found on their homepage.

Publications who took part in the fair included 20x20 magazine, Harry Pye's The Rebel magazine, Plan B, Fever Zine, Dent-de-Leone, BUTT, Useless and Le Gun.

== Public library ==
The Publish And Be Damned Public Library is a travelling archive of past submissions to the fair. Each year (2004–14) new submissions were added.

The collection has so far travelled to, or been featured in exhibitions in:

- Germany (Munich)
- United Kingdom (Glasgow, Liverpool, Manchester, Cambridge, Norwich, Bristol)
- Netherlands (Utrecht)
- United States (Los Angeles, New York)
- Czech Republic (Prague)
- Switzerland (Winterthur)
- Slovakia (Bratislava)

== Funding ==
Publish And Be Damned was funded by grants from various Arts organisations. Since 2004 the event has received support from The Elephant Trust, Arts Council, England, A Foundation, Studio Voltaire, The Goethe Institute, The Polish Cultural Forum, Pro Helvetia and the Mondrian Foundation.

The Public Library received funding from amongst others the Cubitt Gallery, Tranzit, The Elephant Trust, Arts Council England & The British Council.

== Events ==
- 2004's event took place in The Crypt of St James' Church in the Clerkenwell area of London on Sunday 4 July. More than 30 titles from the U.K. and Europe took part.
- 2005's event took place on Sunday 31 July at the same venue as the previous year.
- 2006 saw a change of venue with the event moving to the Rochelle School in the Bethnal Green area of East London.
- 2008 the Rochelle School in Bethnal Green, East London on 3 August 2008.
- 2013 saw Publish and Be Damned come to the South West for the first time with an event at Plymouth Arts Centre, on 3 December 2013. This event was produced in collaboration with arts and culture journal Nom de Strip.

Institute of Contemporary Arts, London, March 17, 2012, 2013
