= This Is Modern Art =

- Season 1
- Starring: Matthew Collings

Release
- Original network: Channel 4

This Is Modern Art was a six-part TV series written and presented by the English art critic Matthew Collings. It was broadcast in 1999 on Channel 4.

== Episode Overview ==
- I am a Genius - assesses the influence of Picasso, Pollock and Warhol and the motifs which connect them.
- Shock! Horror!
- Lovely Lovely
- Nothing matters
- Hollow Laughter
- The Shock of the Now

== Critical reception ==
The series won several awards including a BAFTA. It became popular both because of its sometimes jokey and sometimes thoughtful explanations of the work and attitude of a new wave of artists that had recently been publicized in the British mass media, and because of its author's witty and irreverent, though clearly highly informed, commentary style. Collings went on to create several more TV series and programmes for Channel 4, including Impressionism Revenge of The Nice, Self Portraits The Me Generations and This Is Civilisation.
