= Sweet Toof =

British graffiti artist

Sweet Toof Burning Candy
- Education: Royal Academy of Arts
- Style: Street art
- Movement: Graffiti
- Website: sweettoof.com

Sweet Toof is the pseudonymous name of a United Kingdom graffiti and street artist. Sweet Toof works as both a solo artist and in collaboration with others, including in the Burning Candy crew. His work was featured in “Exit Through the Gift Shop” the British documentary film directed by street artist Banksy(2010).

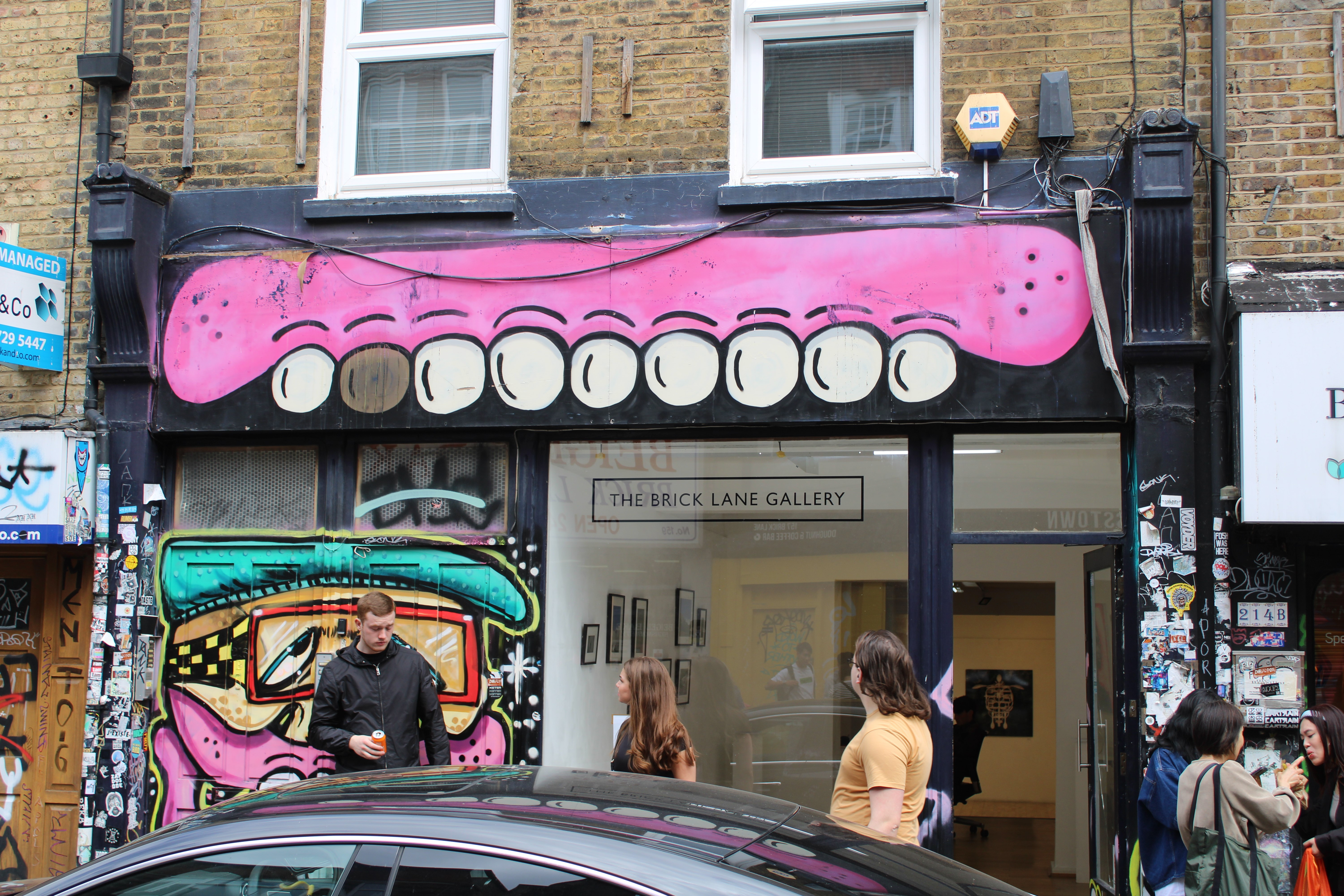
Sweet Toof, Brick Lane, London

== Career ==
He began tagging at age 13, saving up 50p lunch money and buying cheap spray cans to go out at night. He went on to study and graduate with a master's degree from the Royal Academy of Arts.

=== 2010–2022 commercial success and international recognition ===
Sweet Toof was selected as one of the "cutting edge artists" representing London for Cirque du Soleil's "Safewalls" Art Project in 2011. His work is represented by the Victoria and Albert Museum collection and featured in their "Street Art Contemporary Prints" exhibition in 2010, alongside other well-known street artists including Banksy.

International recognition also came around 2010–2022, when Sweet Toof was invited and showcased in "Dead Letter Playground" at Leo Kesting Gallery in New York (2010), "Project Amsterdam Street Art" (ASA All Stars) at Go Gallery in Amsterdam (2011), and "Dark House" at Factory Fresh in New York (2011), "Derailed" at Pandemic Gallery in New York (2014), "Gone fishing" at Black Book Gallery in Colorado (2019), "Emerging To Established: 13th Annual Summer Show at Krause Gallery in New York (2022)

=== 2025 ===
In May 2025 Sweet Toof launched his solo show "BACK ON TRACK" at the Images In Frames gallery, Walthamstow, marking the return of the artist to the UK. In conjunction with his return Sweet Toof produced a number of new spray paint pieces around London in collaboration with artists such as Phlegm, Rowdy, Bonk and Mul. Sweet Toof also participated in the “Here and Now 2025” show at Vrijpaleis in Amsterdam (2025). Banksy was the first to paint in 2017 and in June 2025 Sweet Toof was invited to paint the legendary Rocket Lounge at Glastonbury.

=== Meaning of mouth, teeth and gum imagery ===
According to an account by Olly Beck, Sweet Toof looked at himself in a looking glass "in crisis after a messy break-up", with the enlarged and distorted imagery of the "crescents of teeth", the "visible part of our skeletal frame" as a reminder of mortality. Beck relates Sweet Toof's concerns and imagery with the 16th-century Northern European "Vanitas" tradition of reminding of the transience and vanity of life, and to the Mexican celebration of skull imagery to accepting, honouring and celebrating death as part of the life trip.

Sweet Toof has discussed, "To get one's teeth into things, before it's too late." Elsewhere he notes, "Teeth can be really sexy, or aggressive, but they're also constant reminders of death. They're how we get recognised by police when there's nothing else left."
