= To My Boy =

English electropop duo

- Origin: Liverpool, England
- Genres: Electronic, electropop, power pop
- Years active: 2005–2010
- Labels: XL Recordings
- Members: Sam White; Jack Snape

To My Boy is an Electropop duo consisting of Jack Snape and Sam White, who originate from Chesterfield and Liverpool respectively. They met whilst both members were undergraduate students at Durham University, and were based in Liverpool. They have toured with Jakobínarína and released the album Messages (co-produced by James Ford) in 2007 on the label XL Recordings, as well as several singles.

NME described their music around this time as ranging ‘from ultra-modern synth pop into brilliantly overblown camp ’80s electro’. Fitting with their electronic sound, their lyrics mainly deal with future technology and other science fiction themes. Through the bands Myspace page they also made an acoustic version of their debut briefly available for download. To My Boy's second album, The Habitable Zone, was released on 31 May 2010 on their own label. It was described by Gigwise as a 'more accomplished' album, in which they moved away from science fiction / futuristic themes to more organic, earth based lyrics.'

As of now, Jack Snape and Sam White Haven't released a statement about continuing their musical career or releasing any new music.

== Discography ==
=== Albums ===
All tracks are written by Jack Snape and Sam White.

Messages (2007)
No.	Title	Length
1.	"tell me, computer"	2:33
2.	"EUREKA"	3:13
3.	"outerregions"	2:29
4.	"model"	2:54
5.	"IN THE ZONE"	2:40
6.	"oh, metal!"	2:34
7.	"talk"	3:54
8.	"i am xRAY"	2:08
9.	"eliminate"	2:39
10.	"the Grid"	2:57
11.	"fear of fragility"	4:51
12.	"GAME OVER"	1:39
Total length:		34:31

The Habitable Zone (2010)
No.	Title	Length
1.	"Underneath the Pylons"	3:26
2.	"Hello Horizon"	4:19
3.	"Antarctica"	2:36
4.	"Us + the Wind"	4:36
5.	"When I Was a Cloud"	2:42
6.	"Looking for a New Way"	2:22
7.	"Delightful Beams"	2:44
8.	"Overload"	3:03
9.	"The Generators"	2:27
10.	"We Are Your Ancestors"	3:02
Total length:		31:21

=== Singles ===
- "I am xRAY" / "Outerregions" (2006)
- "The Grid" (2006)
- "Model" (2007)
- "Fear of Fragility" (2007)
- "Us + the Wind" (2009)
