= Chantal Joffe =

British artist

- Born: 5 October 1969 (age 56); St. Albans, Vermont, USA
- Education: Camberwell College of Arts; Glasgow School of Art; Royal College of Art
- Known for: Painting
- Awards: Delfina Studio Trust Award (1994–96); Abbey Scholarship (1998–99); Charles Wollaston Award (2006)

Chantal Joffe RA (born 5 October 1969) is an American-born English artist based in London. Her often large-scale paintings generally depict women and children. In 2006, she received the prestigious Charles Wollaston Award from the Royal Academy.

== Life and education ==
Chantal Joffe was born in St. Albans, Vermont, USA. Her younger brother is the contemporary artist and novelist Jasper Joffe. Their mother, Daryll Joffe, is also an artist, painting in watercolours.

Joffe completed her Foundation studies at Camberwell College of Arts (1987–88). She attended Glasgow School of Art in 1988–91, graduating with honours and receiving her BA in Fine Art. She received her MA in painting from the Royal College of Art, which she attended from 1992–94.

She was honoured with the Delfina Studio Trust Award in 1994–96 and the Abbey Scholarship (British School at Rome) in 1998–99. Joffe lives in London.

== Work ==
Joffe primarily paints expressive portraits of women and children, often in very large scale, sometimes 10 feet (3 m) tall. She has painted her own mother repeatedly, for over 30 years. In a 2009 interview with Stella McCartney, Joffe said, "I really love painting women. Their bodies, their clothes – it all interests me." Source images for her personality-filled oil paintings include family photos, advertising, fashion magazines, and pornography. Working roughly from her photographic source material, Joffe introduces distortions to her depictions.

In the McCartney interview, Joffe mentions the photography of Diane Arbus as an inspiration for her art: "I find photography massively influential. Specifically, Diane Arbus, who I've been obsessed with my whole life. Her work has everything about the portrait of a human that you can ever want."

A critic for The Independent has said of her "big rude paintings" that "she paints with a kind of easy control – effortless without being slick." He further points out that her paintings may give an initial impression of simplicity, charm, or childishness, but "they have an unsettling quality which gives the exhibition an odd, rather menacing mood."

Some of her paintings are so large that she required scaffolding to work on them. Painting in huge, unfussy brushstrokes, she is unconcerned with stray drips and blobs of paint, and sometimes leaves old outlines visible. A reviewer noted that "painting the heads up close also makes for large, wonky eyes and odd proportions, like Picasso re-invented in manga."

In 2006, Colette Meacher, editor of the British magazine Latest Art, described Joffe's large paintings as "simply exquisite representations of femininity". Joffe often draws inspiration from fashion models, "photos of friends, the work of other artists" and images of women and children in realistic poses.

Joffe's work is reminiscent of Alice Neel, with whom she was teamed up for an art show and Joni Mitchell, the Canadian singer, songwriter and figurative artist. This group of artists are known for feminist messages in their work.

== Exhibitions and collections ==
Chantal Joffe's work has shown internationally in many exhibitions. She has had solo exhibitions in London, Milan, Venice, Paris, New York, Helsinki and Bologna. Her work has also been featured in many group exhibitions.

In 2002, she participated in an exhibition entitled The Bold and The Beautiful, at The Pavilions, Mile End Park in London. This show marked the first time Chantal, her mother Daryll Joffe, and her brother Jasper Joffe were featured in an exhibit together.

She won the £25,000 Charles Wollaston Award in the 2006 Royal Academy summer exhibition, for the "most distinguished work in the exhibition". The winning painting was Blond Girl – Black Dress. The judges praised the painting as "an incredibly strong and striking painting ... There was no debate about the winner, the decision was reached unanimously."

Joffe has been featured in exhibitions at the Jewish Museum in New York City, including Using Walls, Floors, and Ceilings: Chantal Joffe in 2015 and Scenes from the Collection in 2019. Joffe's work was included in the 2022 exhibition Women Painting Women at the Modern Art Museum of Fort Worth.

Joffe's work is in the collections of The New Art Gallery, Walsall, Saatchi Gallery (London, England), Berardo Collection Museum (Lisbon, Portugal), Museo Arte Contemporanea Isernia (Isernia, Italy), Museo d'Arte Classica (Zola Predosa, Italy), the Jewish Museum (New York, USA), and The West Collection (Oaks, Pennsylvania). She is represented by the Victoria Miro Gallery in London and Galleria Monica De Cardenas in Milan and Zuoz.

UK public collections featuring her work include The New Art Gallery, Walsall Arts Council Collection, Government Art Collection, Fitzwilliam Museum, Cambridge, Jerwood Collection, Royal Academy of Arts and Royal College of Art.

== Awards ==
Joffe has received numerous awards and recognitions, including:

- Nat West 90's Prize for Art; John Kinross Memorial Scholarship (1991)
- Elizabeth Greenshields Award; Paris Studio Award, Royal College of Art (1993)
- Delfina Studio Trust Award (1994–1996)
- Abbey Scholarship, the British School at Rome (1998–1999)
- The Royal Academy of Arts Summer Exhibition's Wollaston Award (2006)
