= Robin Mason =

British painter (born 1958)

Robin Mason (born 1958) is a British painter born in Porthcawl, South Wales. He is head of BA and MA painting at City and Guilds of London Art School. Between 1977 and 1984 he studied painting at Cardiff College of Art, Wolverhampton Polytechnic and the Royal College of Art. He designed a poster for London Transport in 1991. In 2010 he made a painting installation in an isolated 13th-century church, St. Thomas a Beckett in Kent, based in a decade long study and transcription of the Isenheim Altarpiece by Matthias Grünewald.

His paintings are held by the Royal College of Art and the London Transport Museum. He has exhibited in the UK and overseas.
