= Richard Wathen =

British painter (born 1971)

Richard Llewelyn Wathen is a British painter born in 1971. He lives in Norfolk in England. Wathen graduated with a BA in Fine Art Painting from Winchester School of Art in 1995 and received an MA in Fine Art from the Chelsea School of Art in 1996.

== Style ==
Richard Wathen's paintings are primarily portraits and his works have been compared to those of Thomas Gainsborough in their subject matter and composition, though with a "strangeness" or "uneasiness" about them, even something "eerie" or "grotesque." His works are often described as being initially familiar, with their similarity to historical portraiture in composition and technique, but upon further inspection revealing "disquieting details" which contribute to the sense of eerie strangeness.

== Exhibitions ==
Wathen's works have been exhibited in numerous galleries in cities across Europe and the US including solo shows in London and New York City. In 2004, Wathen contributed to the art exhibition, 100 MOTHERS at The Oxford House in Bethnal Green, London.
