= Ron Arad =

Ron Arad may refer to:

- Ron Arad (pilot) (1958 – missing since 1986, presumed dead), Israeli Air Force weapon systems officer
- Ron Arad (industrial designer) (born 1951), Israeli industrial designer, artist and architect
