= James Jessop =

British artist

- Born: 1974 (age 51–52); Bletchley, England, UK
- Education: The Royal College of Art, Coventry University
- Known for: Painting
- Movement: Contemporary Art
- Patrons: Charles Saatchi
- Website: http://www.jamesjessop.co.uk

James Jessop (born 1974) is a British contemporary artist. He trained at The Royal College of Art (RCA) and Coventry University. He lectures at City and Guilds of London Art School.

His work is influenced by early New York City Subway art and pop culture. He mainly works on large scale canvasses with oil paint, mocking Spoof Horror B-Movie posters. His diptych painting, Fused Foot Star, is in the collection of the RCA.

While working as a security guard, he exhibited in Charles Saatchi's March 2004 New Blood exhibition.

Jessop was shortlisted for the £25,000 Threadneedle Prize at the Mall Galleries, London in 2010.

His 2010 solo show, Beauty and the Beast, at High Roller Society in London included some of his largest works to date, designed to make an impact, still fusing street art with more traditional mediums.

Jessop has worked extensively with Polo Ralph Lauren Jeans in the past year as part of their Art Stars project.

In May 2012 Jessop was featured on BBC 1's The Apprentice UK where the team was challenged to sell the work of various Urban Artists.

In 2018 Jessop exhibited at the Artmossphere Biennale in Moscow. During 2019 he was commissioned to make a new work, which was based on the painting Minerva Protecting Peace from Mars, to go on permanent display in Milton Keynes Central Library where today it is seen by around 20,000 people every month.
