= Jasper Joffe =

British artist (born 1975)

- Born: 1975 (age 50–51)
- Education: Ruskin School of Drawing and Fine Art; Royal College of Art
- Known for: Painting
- Awards: Abbey Scholarship in Painting, British School of Rome (1999–2000)
- Patrons: Charles Saatchi
- Website: http://www.jasperjoffe.com

Jasper Joffe (born 1975) is a British publisher at Joffe Books, contemporary artist and novelist who lives and works in London.

== Life and work ==
Joffe is the brother of artist Chantal Joffe. He studied Fine Art at the Ruskin School of Drawing and Fine Art, Oxford. He completed an MA in painting at The Royal College of Art in London and received the British Prix de Rome scholarship to the British School at Rome, where he spent nine months. He has had solo exhibitions in London, Rome and Milan. He is the author of "Water" published by Telegram Books in 2006.

On graduating from the Royal College of Art, Joffe painted 24 paintings in 24 hours at the Chisenhale Gallery in 1999, each canvas was 12 feet by 6 feet. In 2000 he repeated the feat in Milan at Laura Pecci Gallery, although this time the paintings were a variety of sizes. In 2003 he did 72 paintings in 72 hours at Brno House of Arts in the Czech Republic, the canvases this time being the same sizes as Goya painted between 1789 and 1815.

In 2004, Joffe exhibited at Rosy Wilde gallery in East London. His exhibition "Beauty Show" at the V22 Gallery in London (January–February 2008) caused controversy due to its featuring a pastel painting of Heinrich Himmler, which was bought by Charles Saatchi.

In 2009 Joffe, having left his gallery and been left by his girlfriend, sold all his possessions and paintings in "The Sale of a Lifetime" at Idea Generation Gallery in London. In May 2012, he showed his paintings of actresses and dictators in a show titled "Power & Beauty" at Kenny Schachter Rove Gallery in Hoxton Square London.

Joffe is also the founder and regular contributor to the contemporary art and cultural reviews site worldwidereview which allows people from around the world open access to read and write criticism. He is a tutor at City and Guilds of London Art School

== Free Art Fair ==
In 2007 he created the Free Art Fair in central London. It was an art exhibition where all the art works that were in the exhibition were given away at the end of the exhibition. Other artists who exhibited at the Free Art Fair included Harry Pye, Bruce McLean, and Bob and Roberta Smith. The event was intended to contrast the Free Art Fair with another art fair occurring at the same time (October 2007), the Frieze Art Fair. By all accounts, the timing and execution of the Free Art Fair was indeed effective. The giveaway of the works of art received live coverage on BBC News 24, and a queue formed overnight.

The Free Art Fair returned in 2008 with 50 artists participating and a program of performance art organised by Lee Campbell and Frog Morris. A catalogue included an interview with Lewis Hyde author of "The Gift". Artists included Gavin Turk, Marta Marce, Martin Sexton, Stephen Farthing, and Stella Vine.

In 2009 the final fair took place at The Barbican Centre in London. Artists including Marlene Dumas, Bob & Roberta Smith, Robin Mason, Harry Pye, Artists Anonymous and Geraldine Swayne gave away work.

== Collaborations with Harry Pye ==
Joffe has collaborated with artist Harry Pye on projects such as The Tate Modern in a dry cleaner in 2010 which included a talk by Turner Prize winner Mark Leckey

They made their own handmade 99p shop in 2011, and produced ‘Joffe et Pye’ at Chateau Joffe in 2011. Ekow Eshun on Radio 4 said of the show: ‘Intense feelings about love, loneliness and fear, anxiety desire and hope and ambition all come into play into these paintings. Very powerful I thought. What could have been fey, arch or game playing was actually very warm."

== Art Fair Controversy ==
In 2010 Joffe debated whether "art fairs are about money" with Louisa Buck, Matthew Collings, and Joffe for the motion and against the motion Norman Rosenthal, Richard Wentworth, Matthew Slotover. Joffe claims that his criticisms of Frieze Art Fair led to his work being banned from the fair in 2010. Matthew Slotover, director of Frieze Art Fair had taken part in the debate on art fairs.
