= Francis Upritchard =

New Zealand contemporary artist

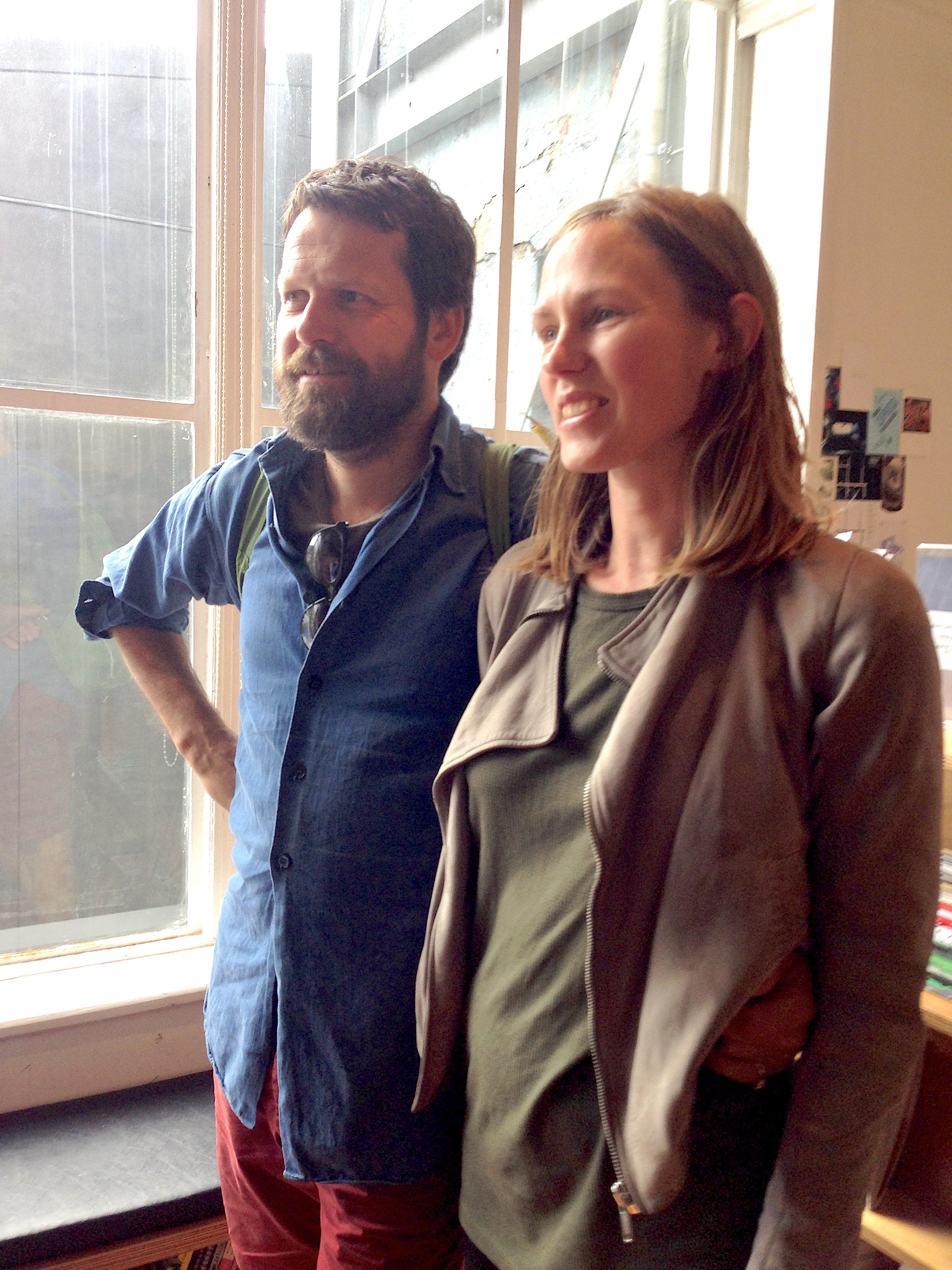
- Francis Upritchard with her partner Martino Gamper in Wellington, 2014
- Born: 1976 (age 49–50); New Plymouth, New Zealand
- Education: Ilam School of Fine Arts
- Known for: Sculpture
- Awards: Walters Prize

Francis Upritchard (born 1976) is a New Zealand contemporary artist based in London. In 2009, she represented New Zealand at the Venice Biennale.

== Education ==
Upritchard graduated from the Ilam School of Fine Arts at the University of Canterbury, School of Fine Arts in 1997. She had initially thought to study painting, but became interested in sculpture during her first year.

Soon after graduating, Upritchard moved to London.

== Work ==
Upritchard's early work often referenced museum displays, collections of artefacts, and ancient cultures. She often combined found objects with her own hand-made additions, such as sculpted heads made from modelling clay of dogs, monkeys and birds inserted into the necks of ceramic and glass vessels, or fastened onto pieces of sporting equipment like hockey sticks and cricket bats. Other works showed faux-antique delicate instruments in shabby velvet-lined boxes. She also became known for her sculptures that replicated shrunken heads, resting on display cabinets or mounted on small pedestals. Made of plaster and paper mache, the heads referenced mokomokai, tattooed shrunken heads made by New Zealand's indigenous Māori, but the features were those of Pākeha peoples.

In 2006/2007, Upritchard decided to start exploring the human figure in her work. In a 2012 newspaper profile she said: 'I didn't think there was so much good figurative work in contemporary sculpture. [...] I went to Munich and saw [the 15th-century sculptor] Erasmus Grasser's Morris Dancers.' Upritchard's figures are made of polymer clay laid over wire armatures; their skin is painted in everything from neutral tones to brightly coloured grids, and they are variously naked and clothed in robes and gowns, also made by the artist. Curator Anne Ellegood writes:

Some hail from long-ago eras—protagonists of medieval mythology like the knight, the harlequin, the jester—while others are from the more recent past—beatniks, hippies, and other nonconformists. Various figures are identified by their vocation—music teacher, potato seller, psychic—or distilled to a primary, and often less than laudatory, characteristic, such as “liar,” “misanthrope,” “ninny,” or “nincompoop.”

The influences on Upritchard's figurative sculptures are various: the figures in the Bayeux Tapestry, Japanese Noh theatre, 1960s psychedelic portraiture, Grasser's wooden figures, the bronze figures of the Chola dynasty, court jesters and medieval performers. Writers about these works often reference counter-cultural movements, hippies, shamans and marionettes when describing them. Comparisons have been made to the earlier work of Bruce Conner and Paul Thek and Upritchard's closer contemporaries Ryan Trecartin, Lizzie Fitch and Saya Woolfalk.

Upritchard often collaborates with furniture designer Martino Gamper (also her husband) on the plinths her sculpted forms stand on, which sometimes take the forms of tables and bureaus, and more recently of steel pedestals. Natalie Hegert writes:

The care taken in the aesthetic choices of furniture reveals Upritchard’s interest in craft, further evidenced by her attention to textiles, lamps, jewelry, urns, and other accoutrements. In Upritchard’s sculpture, it is not enough for the figure to be sculpted from clay and set upright—the drapery, adornment, and environment related to the figure are integral to the work itself.

== Career ==
=== Bart Wells Institute and Beck's Future nomination ===
In December 2001, Upritchard co-founded an artist-run space, the Bart Wells Institute, with fellow artist Luke Gottelier in a semi-derelict Hackney warehouse. The Bart Wells Institute ran for about two years and exhibitions were curated by artists including Sam Basu, Brian Griffiths, David Thorpe and Harry Pye.

In 2003 Upritchard was shortlisted for the Beck's Futures prize for an installation titled Save Yourself, now in the Saatchi Gallery collection. The installation, featuring a small mummy figure, wrapped in rags lying on the floor vibrating and moaning, surrounded by canopic jars, was shown at the Bart Wells Institute. The work was seen by Beck's Future selector Michael Landy, who nominated it for the award. The work was seen by collector Charles Saatchi and the nomination and acquisition were Upritchard's career break-through.

=== Walters Prize award ===
In 2005 Upritchard had her first exhibition in New Zealand, Doomed, Doomed, All Doomed at Artspace, Auckland. The previous year her work had been shown at City Gallery Wellington in the survey exhibition of recent New Zealand contemporary art Prospect: New New Zealand Art. Doomed, Doomed, All Doomed was nominated for the 2006 Walters Prize, hosted by Auckland Art Gallery and Upritchard was selected as the winner by judge Carolyn Christov-Bakargiev. In her citation Christov-Bakargiev wrote:

I had seen images of Upritchard's work, and of some of the other finalists' works, previous to experiencing this exhibition. But I had never seen the work in the flesh. The difference is astounding. Upritchard's work resists photography and reproduction, and this too, in the age of overwhelming communications and surveillance technology, gives me a good feeling, somewhat of an escape route.

=== Venice Biennale ===
In 2008 New Zealand's public arts funding body Creative New Zealand announced that two artists would represent New Zealand at the 2009 Venice Biennale: Upritchard and painter Judy Millar.

Upritchard's work for the Biennale consisted of a number of sculptural installations displayed in the former private residence, the Fondazione Claudio Buziol. Titled Save Yourself, the works showed dreamy or dancing figures displayed on hand-made tables, mixed with ceramic lamps. It was the first time Upritchard mixed figures and furniture in such a way, an approach which has become a signature aspect of her current work. The figures, handbuilt from polymer clay, stand about 50 centimetres tall. Usually naked, or adorned with handmade and hand-dyed cloaks and textile wrappers, they are painted variously in solid block colours or patterns, including Harlequin blocks and grids. The artist said of these works:

I want to create a visionary landscape, which refers to the hallucinatory works of the medieval painters Hieronymus Bosch and Pieter Bruegel, and simultaneously draws on the utopian rhetoric of post-sixties counterculture, high modernist futurism and the warped dreams of survivalists, millenarians, and social exiles.

The Museum of New Zealand Te Papa Tongarewa acquired the work Dancers from the installation for its permanent collection. Two other works, Horse Man and Rainwob Tree, are in the collection of the Govett-Brewster Art Gallery.

=== Collaborative works ===
In recent years Upritchard has frequently collaborated with furniture designer Martino Gamper (also her husband) and jeweller Karl Fritsch. In their 2009 exhibition Feierabend at Kate Macgarry was an early outing of their collaborative works, mixing Gamper's furniture with Upricthard's sculpted figures and Fritsch's jewellery and objects.

For their 2011 installation Gesamtkunsthandwerk for the Govett-Brewster Art Gallery's international group exhibition Stealing the Senses, Upritchard, Fritsch and Gamper collaborated with other New Zealand artists, most from New Plymouth: weaver Lynne Mackay, potter Nicholas Brandon, bronze-caster Jonathan Campbell, felter Pam Robinson, glass blower Jochen Holz and woodturners Jan Komarkowski and Peter Wales. The exhibition was re-presented at Hamish McKay Gallery in Wellington. The title is a German word meaning 'a total artwork that involves all the parts of the arts and in particular the work of the handmade'. The artists stated:

We don't understand why there needs to be such distinctions amongst art, craft and design. Arts and crafts weren't always separated.

We are interested in collapsing hierarchies that operate in language and value.

We feel that we are making work with similar intuition, care and intent.

Upritchard continues to work collaboratively and enlist others in the making of her work, most recently with New Plymouth potter Nicholas Brandon, who was trained by Mirek Smíšek. For her 2016 exhibition Dark Resters at Ivan Anthony Gallery in Auckland and the Ilam Campus Gallery at Canterbury University Brandon made ceramic works and glazes that formed part of Upritchard's installations, with textiles and her signature figures.

=== Public art ===
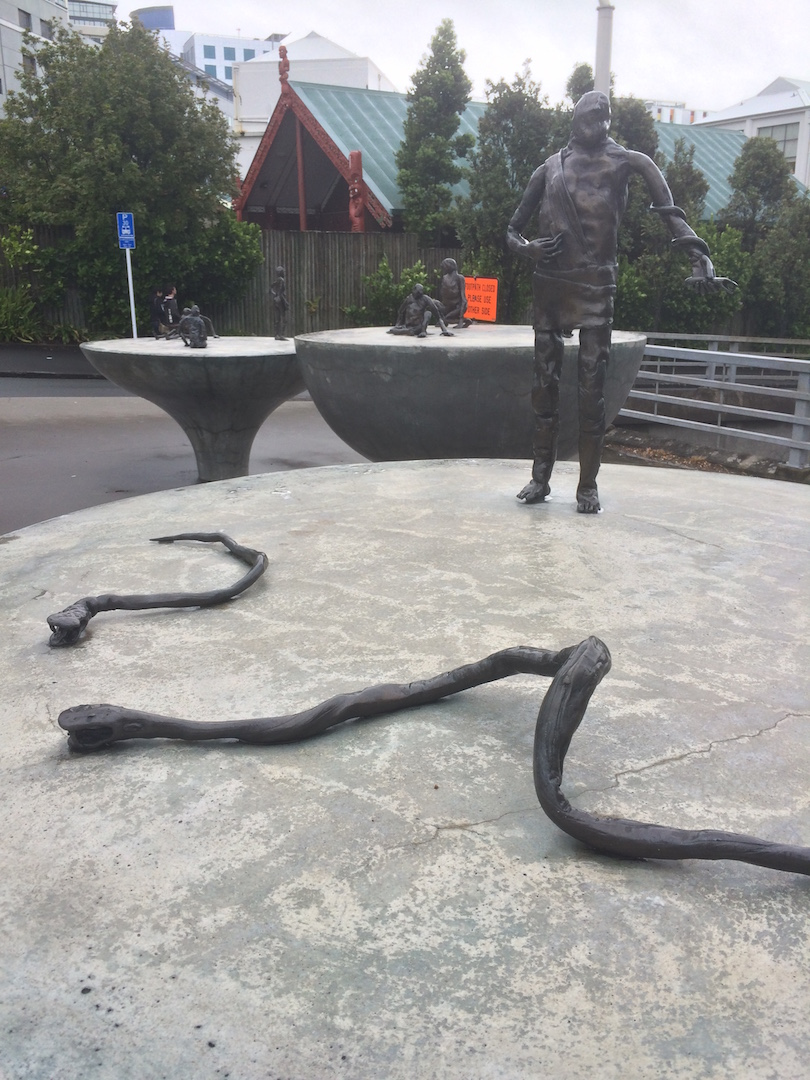
Loafers (2012) located on the Symonds Street overpass in Auckland, New Zealand

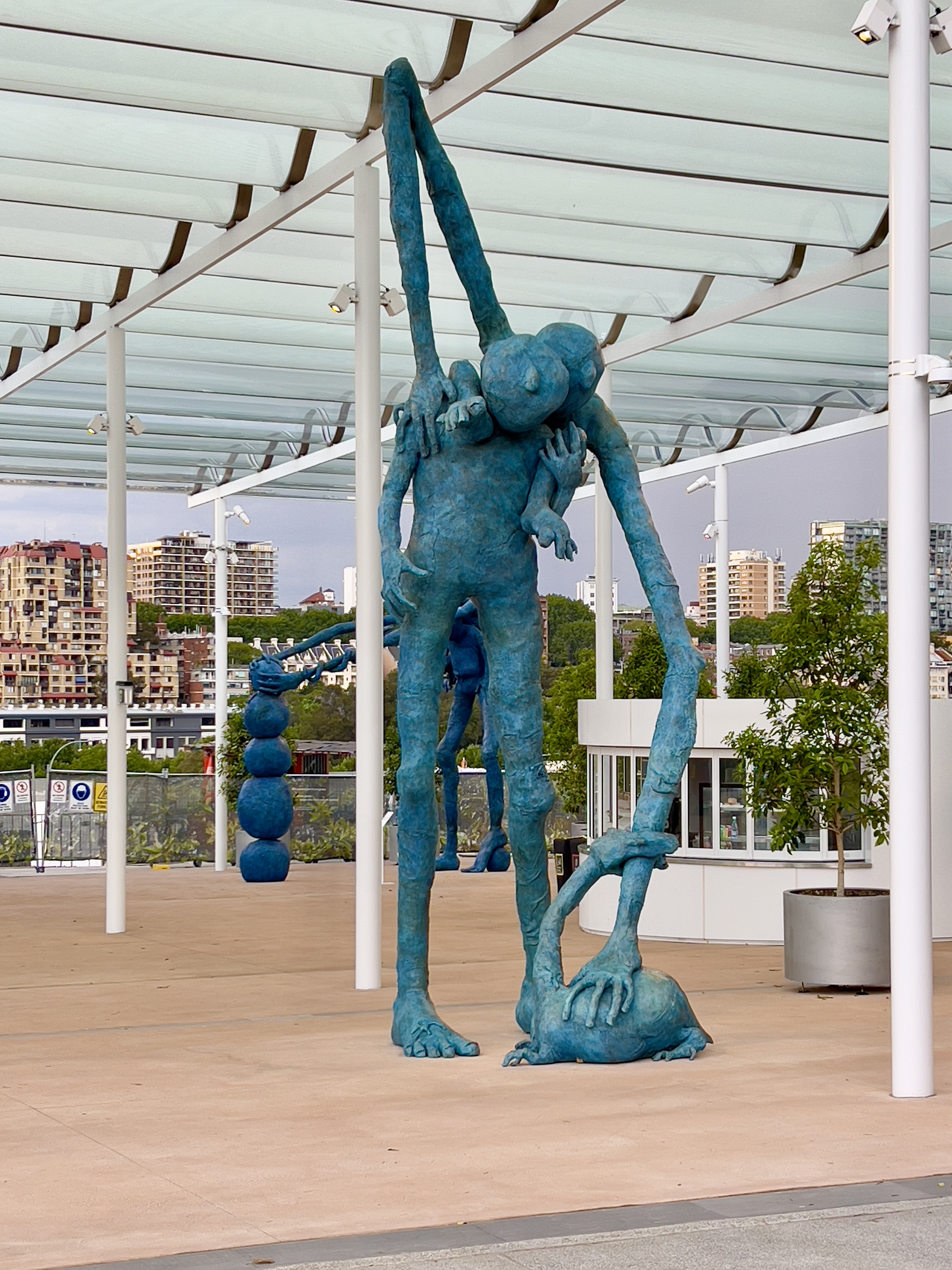
Here Comes Everybody (2022) at the Art Gallery of New South Wales, Sydney, Australia

Upritchard's first piece of public art is installed in inner-city Auckland on Symonds Street. Titled Loafers, the work consists of three bowl-shaped concrete plinths topped with Upritchard's idiosyncratic human figures, and several snake forms, cast from bronze. Upritchard has said of these works:

The Loafers plinths reference important ceramic artist Lucie Rie. Rie pioneered domestic-ware in Britain, and her small works were developed at the same time as huge outdoor bronzes and in my mind, share a sort of 1950's aesthetic.

In 2022, Upritchard's Here Comes Everybody was unveiled for the Sydney Modern Project of the Art Gallery of New South Wales.

=== Survey exhibition: Jealous Saboteurs ===
In February 2016 a survey show of the first 20 years' of Upritchard's work, Francis Upritchard: Jealous Saboteurs, opened at MUMA (the Monash University Museum of Art, Melbourne). The exhibition was co-curated by MUMA director Charlotte Day and City Gallery Wellington chief curator Robert Leonard. The exhibition opened at City Gallery Wellington in May 2016.

== Publications ==
Upritchard's own work is informed by her reading, especially in the area of speculative fiction, and the catalogues accompanying her work often feature essays by novelists, including Hari Kunzru, David Mitchell and Ali Smith.

Publications on Upritchard's work include:

- Heads of Yesteryear, London: Kate Macgarry, 2005
- Doomed, Doomed, All Doomed, Auckland: Artspace, 2005. ISBN 0958255636
- Human Problems, London and Rotterdam: Kate Macgarry and Veenman, 2006. ISBN 9086900305
- Every colour by itself, London: Dent-de-Leone, 2009. ISBN 9780956188502
- Save Yourself, New Plymouth: Govett-Brewster Art Gallery, 2009. ISBN 9780908848348
- In die Hole, London: Dent-de-Leone, 2010. ISBN 9780956188564
- A hand of cards, Nottingham: Nottingham Contemporary, 2012. ISBN 9781907421044
- Francis Upritchard: Mandrake, Dublin: The Douglas Hyde Gallery, 2013. ISBN 9781905397433
- Francis Upritchard: Potato poem, Kyoto: Foiru, 2013. ISBN 9784902943832
- Francis Upritchard's Moneksy and Sloth, London: Whitechapel Gallery and Garden Press, 2014. ISBN 9780854882311

== Public gallery exhibitions ==
- 2016 Francis Upritchard: Jealous Saboteurs, Monash University Museum of Art, Melbourne and City Gallery Wellington; Dark Resters, Ilam Campus Gallery, University of Canterbury and Ivan Anthony Gallery Auckland
- 2014 Hammer Projects: Francis Upritchard, Hammer Museum Los Angeles; Whitechapel Gallery Children's Art Commission, Whitechapel Gallery
- 2013 Potato Poem, Marugame Genichiro-Inokuma Museum of Contemporary Art (MIMOCA), Kargawa, Japan
- 2012 Francis Upritchard: A Long Wait, Contemporary Arts Center, Cincinnati; A Hand of Cards, Nottingham Contemporary, Nottingham
- 2011 Echo, Kunsthal KAdE, Amersfoor, the Netherlands; Gesamtkunsthandwerk with Martino Gamper and Karl Fritsch
- 2010 IN DIE HÖHLE, Wiener Secession, Vienna
- 2010 Save Yourself, Museum of New Zealand Te Papa Tongarewa
- 2009 Save Yourself, New Zealand representation at the 53rd Venice Biennale,
- 2008 Rainwob I, Govett-Brewster Art Gallery; Rainwob II, Artspace, Auckland and Gertrude Contemporary Art Spaces, Melbourne
- 2006 The Walters Prize, Auckland Art Gallery
- 2005 Doomed, Doomed, All Doomed, Artspace, Auckland
- 2004 Artist in Residence, Camden Arts Centre
- 2003 Boxing Arms, Dunedin Public Art Gallery
