= Liz Neal =

British artist (born 1973)

Liz Neal (born 1973) is an artist based in London.

Neal grew up in North Wales. Neal has a BA in Fine Art at Middlesex University and graduated from the Royal College of Art with an MA from the printmaking department. She makes paintings and installations which reference sexual, consumer and fantasy imagery.

== Selected exhibitions ==
2009

Some Product, Satorial Contemporary Art, London

2007

An Archaeology, 176, London

2005

404 Arte Contemporanea, Naples

M'ars, Moscow

Dolore, curated by Klarita Pandolfi with Harry Pye, Sartorial Contemporary Art, London

2004

New Blood, Saatchi Gallery, London

Collaboration with Nick Knight at SHOWstudio: Lotus Eater, STORE, London and Room, Transition Gallery, London

The Ragged School, London

2003

Saatchi Gallery, London

Gloriana, One in the Other, London

2001

Death to the Fascist Insect, Anthony D'Offay Gallery, London

2000

RCA Secret, Royal College of Art, London
