= Matthew Collings =

Artist and writer (born 1955)

- Born: 1955 (age 70–71); London, England
- Education: Byam Shaw School of Art; Goldsmiths College
- Occupations: Artist, writer, broadcaster
- Spouse: Emma Biggs

Matthew Collings (born 1955) is a British art critic, writer, broadcaster, and artist.

== Career ==
Collings began his career working at the magazine Artscribe, first in the production department in 1979 and later taking over as editor, filling that role from 1983 to 1987, bringing international relevance to the magazine. In 1987, he received a Turner Prize commendation for his work on Artscribe. Collings later moved into television, working as a producer and presenter on the BBC's The Late Show from 1989 to 1995. In the early 1990s, he brought Martin Kippenberger into the BBC studios to create an installation, and he interviewed Georg Herold while this Cologne-based conceptual artist painted a large canvas with beluga caviar. Collings gave Jeff Koons his first sympathetic exposure on British TV, and Damien Hirst was also introduced for the first time to the UK TV audience by Collings.

Collings wrote and presented documentary films for the BBC on individual artists, including Donald Judd, Georgia O'Keeffe and Willem de Kooning, as well as broader historical subjects such as Hitler's "Degenerate art" exhibition, art looted in the Second World War by Germany and Russia, Situationism, Spain's post-Franco art world and the rise of the Cologne art scene.

After leaving the BBC, Collings wrote Blimey! From Bohemia to Britpop: The London Artworld from Francis Bacon to Damien Hirst, which humorously chronicled the rise of the Young British Artists (YBA) movement. Published in 1997 by 21, a new company founded by David Bowie, among a group of others, Blimey! was described by Artforum magazine as "…one of the best-selling contemporary-art books ever". (Kate Bush on the YBA Sensation, Artforum, 2004). The article went on to say that Collings "invented the perfect voice to complement YBA: He makes an impact without (crucially) ever appearing to try too hard." The following year, Collings wrote and presented the Channel 4 TV series This is Modern Art, which won him a BAFTA (2000), among other awards.

Collings wrote and presented a Channel 4 series in 2003 about the "painterly" stream of Old Master painting, called Matt's Old Masters. A book by the same title accompanied the series. Further Channel 4 series by Collings included Impressionism: Revenge of the Nice (2004) and The Me Generations: Self Portraits, (2005). Between 1997 and 2005, Collings presented the Channel 4 TV programme on the Turner Prize.

In 2007, he wrote and presented the Channel 4 TV series This is Civilisation. In 2009, he appeared on the BBC Two programme School of Saatchi, a reality TV show for newly trained UK artists.

In October 2010, he wrote and presented a BBC Two series called Renaissance Revolution, in which he discussed three Renaissance paintings: Raphael's Madonna del Prato; Hieronymus Bosch's The Garden of Earthly Delights; and Piero della Francesca's The Baptism of Christ. In 2014, Collings wrote and presented a 90-minute documentary for BBC Four on abstract art: The Rules of Abstraction considered early modernist beginnings by Paul Klee, Wassily Kandinsky, Hilma af Klint, and others, as well as contemporary continuities, ranging from Fiona Rae to El Anatsui. In the same year, Collings appeared in Frederick Wiseman's documentary National Gallery, composing and rehearsing a piece-to-camera on Turner's The Fighting Temeraire, for the documentary Turner's Thames (2012), which Collings wrote and presented for BBC Four.

Since 2015, he has been the regular art critic for the Evening Standard, replacing Brian Sewell, who died that year.

In 2026, hundreds of works by Matthew Collings criticizing Zionism and genocide in Gaza were presented at an exhibition at Joseph Wales Studios in Margate, Kent. Politically motivated journalists claimed the drawings in Margate contained antisemitic tropes, including depicting Jewish people eating babies. No art critic has ever criticised the exhibition. Collings denied the antisemitic interpretation. He pointed out that there were no such images in the show. Kent Police determined the drawings broke no criminal laws and were not antisemitic but criticised the state of Israel.

== Personal life ==
Collings is married to Emma Biggs, with whom he collaborates on art works.

=== Suspension from Labour Party ===
In 2019, Collings was picked as Parliamentary candidate for the Labour Party for the South West Norfolk constituency, but was suspended by the party a day later over some of his social media posts, including one in which he called former chief rabbi Jonathan Sacks a "hate filled racist".

== Books ==
- Blimey! – From Bohemia to Britpop: London Art World from Francis Bacon to Damien Hirst, 21 Publishing, 1997
- It Hurts – New York Art from Warhol to Now, 21 Publishing, 2000
- This is Modern Art, Weidenfeld & Nicolson and Watson-Guptill Publications, 2000
- Art Crazy Nation, 21 Publishing, 2001
- Sarah Lucas, Tate Publishing, 2002
- Matt's Old Masters: Titian, Rubens, Velázquez, Hogarth, Weidenfeld & Nicolson, 2003
- Criticism (with Matthew Arnatt), Rachmaninoff's, 2004
- Ron Arad interviewed by Matthew Collings, Phaidon, 2004
- This is Civilisation, 21 Publishing, 2008

== Video and television ==
- Omnibus: Willem de Kooning (BBC TV documentary), narrator, 1995
- This Is Modern Art (Channel 4 TV series documentary) 1998
- Hello Culture – (Channel 4 TV series documentary) 2001
- 2003 Matt's Old Masters (Channel 4 TV series documentary) Hogarth, Velázquez, Rubens, Titian
- Impressionism: Revenge of the Nice (Channel 4 TV series documentary) 2004
- Self Portraits (Channel 4 TV series documentary) 2005
- This Is Civilisation (BBC TV series documentary) 2007
- What is Beauty? (BBC TV documentary) 2009
- Renaissance Revolution: Raphael, Piero, Bosch (BBC TV series documentary) 2010
- Beautiful Equations (BBC Four TV one-hour documentary) 2010
- Turner's Thames (BBC Two one-hour documentary)
- The Rules of Abstraction with Matthew Collings (BBC Four TV documentary) 2014
