= Geraldine Swayne =

English painter

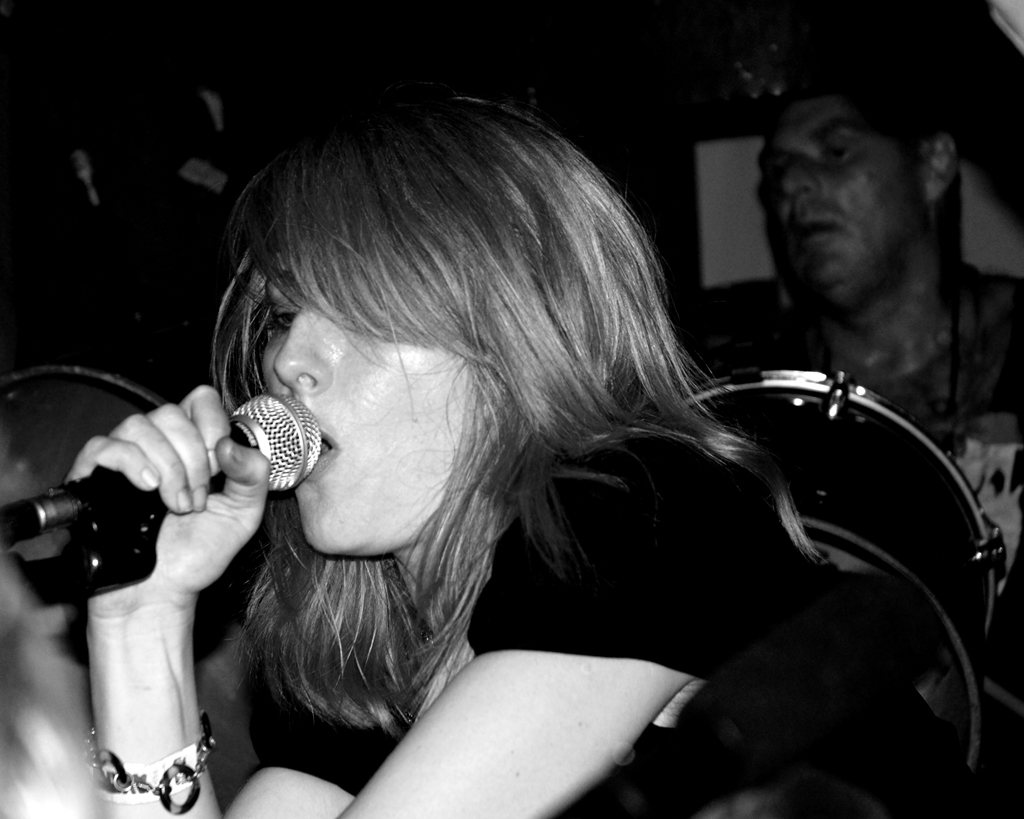
- Geraldine Swayne performing with Faust in Schiphorst, Germany on 5 July 2008.
- Born: Geraldine Swayne; 1965 (age 60–61); Guildford, Surrey, England
- Education: Newcastle University
- Occupations: Artist, beekeeper, filmmaker
- Known for: painter and musician
- Website: www.geraldineswayne.org

Geraldine Swayne (born 1965) is an English painter based in East Sussex. She works mainly in miniature in enamel on metal.

Swayne studied Fine Art at Newcastle University from 1985–1989 and in 1990, she won a Northern Arts Travel award to paint and make super-8 films about voodoo in New Orleans, then moved to rural France for a year, living as a portraitist and making a series of large outdoor paintings. In 1992 she moved to the UK and became a pioneer special effects designer at Computer Film Company, in London and later, in Los Angeles.

Since 1999, she has made numerous experimental films including the world’s first super-8 to Imax film East End, produced by Cathy Shaw, and narrated by Miriam Margolyes with music by Nick Cave. After leaving the film industry in 2004, Swayne worked as an assistant for Jake and Dinos Chapman rebuilding Hell. Although better known as a painter, in 2005 she joined experimental rock group Bender and, in the following year, became a member of 'Krautrock' group Faust, with whom she has recorded two albums and toured widely, making musical improvisations and live paintings at venues such as the Wrexner Centre for the Arts in Ohio, Detroit Museum of Contemporary Art and CalArts.

More recent solo shows include 'Silvering' 2017, at the Fine Art Society, London, 'Geraldine Swayne' at W186 Project Rooms, Aeroplatics Gallery, Belgium and 'Geraldine Swayne' 2013 at Future Art Projects, Sheep Lane, London in 2013. Group shows include 'Performance and Remnant' at the Fine Art Society, London, 'Suspicion' at Jerwood Space, London, 'Volta' New York, 'The Future Can Wait' at B1 for Saatchi Gallery, 'Its Our Music Its Our Art' at David Risley, Copenhagen, 'The Free Art Fair' at Barbican Centre, London, 'Fresh Air Machine' at Calvert 22 Gallery, London, and 'Kunst aus Klang' Contemporary Fine Art Berlin. In 2010 she was a finalist in the John Moores Painting Prize, Walker Gallery, Liverpool, and in 2014 she had her first Museum show in 'Were Still Here' at Magasin6 in Stockholm. She was also nominated to the list of 'top ten art/music cross-over artists' by Dazed magazine in 2014. In 2015, she was awarded a live/work residency at Acme Fire-station in East London.
