= Eiji Uematsu =

Japanese artist

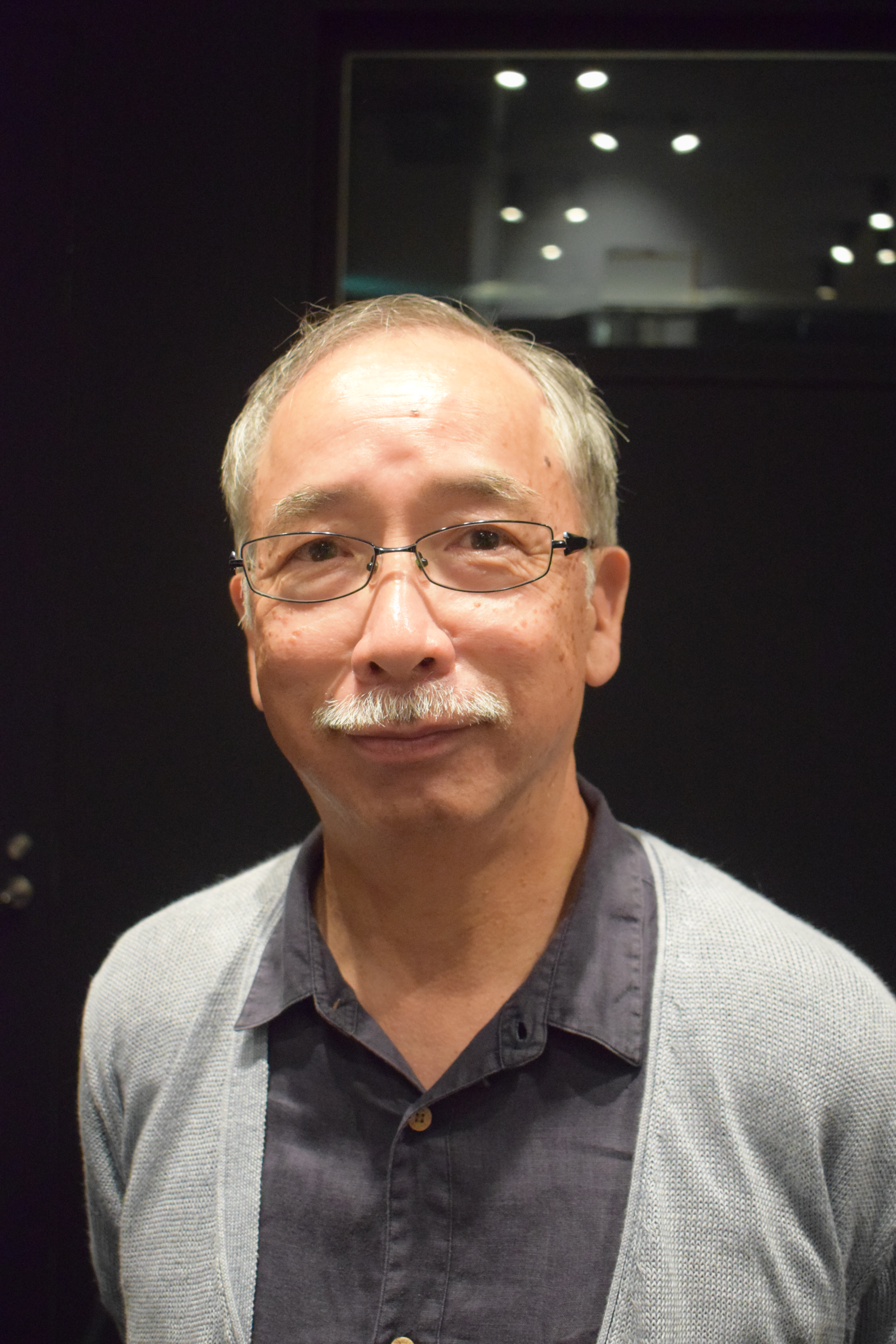
- Born: Hyōgo Prefecture, Kobe, Japan
- Known for: Sculpture, pottery, installation art

Eiji Uematsu (b.1949) is a Japanese artist who is known for making earthenware ceramics and installations. Although he works in clay, Uematsu does not identify as a ceramicist. Instead, he considers his artistic practice to be a process where he playfully represents the spatial, environmental, and psychological affordances of clay. He states that “I think of myself as neither a ceramist nor an artist. Rather than expression, I feel more strongly that I want to deal with the clay. And, I hope to share what I see and feel from the clay with many people.”

== Early life and career ==
Uematsu was born in Hyōgo Prefecture, Kobe in 1949. His father worked for a print shop where he did illustrations and typesetting. His older brother Keiji is also an artist.

Eiji's interest in clay piqued during his childhood while he engaged in explorations with mud play and the Japanese art form dorodango, a process he later expanded upon as he developed his distinct style of conceptual ceramics.

Uematsu started his art career in 1972, initially making relief sculptures with clay. He moved to Shigaraki in 1975 to work at a pottery factory. In 1982 Uematsu moved to the city of Iga, where he built his own wood and kerosene fueled kiln and began experimenting with pit-fired pottery, using the noyaki method of controlled burning.

== Style ==
Uematsu's sculpture and installation artworks evoke the physical and conceptual properties of clay. He often creates earthenware sculptures that are heavily textured and unglazed. The forms of his ceramic works are derived from forms in nature and the prehistoric legacy of using clay to make objects.

Uematsu's playful explorations with mud and soil during his youth are evident in artworks such as Clay Flower (2012), which he created by repeatedly throwing lumps of clay slip onto the floor and firing the emerging form.

Uematsu's relationship and command of heat is another key element to his approach. He sees fire as an inspiration and collaborator. In some of his works he uses powdered clay on the surface, and enables the heat of the kiln to leave dramatic cracks in its exterior.

== Exhibitions ==
Uematsu's earthenware works have been exhibited in both Japan and internationally since 1980. His work has been exhibited by many galleries including Gallery 38 in Tokyo, ARTCOURT Gallery in Osaka, and t.gallery in Tokyo, Shibunkaku in Kyoto, and Tokyo Gendai.

In addition to exhibiting in galleries and museums, he received a commission to create sculptures for the Shigaraki Ceramic Sculpture Park in 1996.

Uematsu's solo exhibition titled Shape of Soil was on view at The Museum of Arts & Crafts Itami, Hyogo in 2007. In 2009, the Horiuchi Foundation sponsored a solo exhibition of Uematsu's work called Soil / Fire to the Root at the Koumi-Machi Kougen Museum of Art in Nagano. Kyoto City University of Arts Art Gallery presented Eiji Uematsu: The Sky that the Rabbits Saw in 2016. In 2020, a solo exhibition titled Soil and Fire was on view at The Museum of Ceramic Art, Hyogo.

Uematsu's work has also been presented in art fairs such as FRIEZE in New York (2018), Art Fair Tokyo (2019), and the Art in Park Tokyo Hotel art fair in 2019.

== Collections ==
Uematsu's work is in the collection of the Minneapolis Institute of Art (Mia).
