= Frieze Art Fair =

International contemporary art fair in London

- Status: Active
- Genre: Contemporary art fair
- Frequency: Annually
- Venue: Regent's Park
- Locations: London, England
- Country: U.K.
- Years active: 22–23
- Inaugurated: 2003 (23 years ago)
- Founder: Frieze magazine
- Sponsor: Frieze magazine
- Website: friezeartfair.co

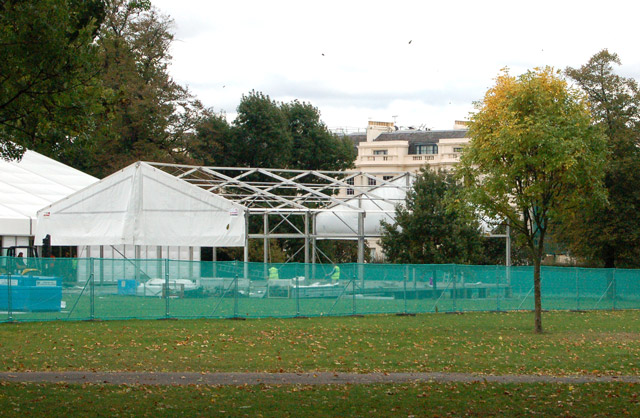
Frieze Art Fair under construction in Regent's Park, in 2009.

Frieze Art Fair is an annual contemporary art fair first held in 2003 in London's Regent's Park. Developed by the founders of the contemporary art magazine Frieze, the fair has since expanded to include editions in four cities, in addition to acquiring several other art fairs.

Following the original Frieze Art Fair (also referred to as Frieze London), the fair added Frieze Masters (2012), also in London, dedicated to art made before the year 2000; Frieze New York (2012); Frieze Los Angeles (2019); Frieze Seoul (2022); and Frieze Abu Dhabi (2026). In 2023, Frieze acquired The Armory Show in New York, and EXPO Chicago.

In 2016, American holding company Endeavor acquired a majority stake in Frieze. In 2025, the co-founder of Endeavor, Ari Emanuel, is set to buy Frieze in a deal valued at $200 million.

== History ==
Frieze magazine was launched in 1991 by Amanda Sharp, Matthew Slotover, and artist Tom Gidley. The magazine was initially conceived of as an alternative to more established art publications like Artforum, and drew contributors like Hilton Als, Peter Schjeldahl, and Lynne Tillman.

In 2003, Slotover and Sharp parted ways with Gidley and launched Frieze Art Fair. Early editions of the fair saw steady increases in attendance, rising from 27,700 at the first fair to 105,000 in 2016. Frieze has been noted for being among the first art fairs to implement practices like commissioning works from artists and holding artist talks during the fair. Multiple writers have stated that the original Frieze Art Fair helped unite London's art scene, which was gaining in prominence after significant investments in institutions like the Tate Modern. Despite high attendance, it was suggested in 2006 that only 20% of the fair's 68,000 visitors intend to buy work. Frieze stopped self-reporting sales figures in 2006, claiming that the figures were not accurate given that many sales happen in private or following the end of the fair's run. In 2007, Gavin Brown’s Enterprise booth at Frieze was transformed into a flea market, showcasing the fair's willingness to embrace immersive art experiences. Since the mid-2000s, auction houses like Christie's, Sotheby's and Phillips have expanded their mid-season contemporary sales to coincide with Frieze London.

In 2010, Slotover participated in a formal debate at London's Saatchi Gallery with artists including Jasper Joffe on the subject of whether "art fairs are about money." Joffe claimed that his criticisms of Frieze and Slotover led to his work being banned from the fair that year.

In May 2011, Slotover and Sharp announced the launch of two new art fairs, Frieze New York and Frieze Masters, with their first editions occurring in 2012, directed by Victoria Siddall. Frieze Masters, held concurrently to the original Frieze Art Fair, comprises art made before the year 2000. In 2014, as Global Director, Siddall launched Freize's fairs in Los Angeles, New York, and London.

In 2016, American talent agency and holding group Endeavor acquired a 70% controlling stake in the Frieze brand, including the magazine and art fairs. Following the acquisition, Slotover and Sharp continued to lead the company until 2020 when Simon Fox, a former media executive at Reach plc, was named CEO, overseeing all publications and fairs.

In 2017, Hauser & Wirth invited classics scholar Mary Beard to open a fake museum at Frieze consisting of artifacts bought on ebay.

In 2019, the fair expanded again with the addition of Frieze Los Angeles, followed by Frieze Seoul in 2022. Writers have compared Frieze's presence in Los Angeles and Seoul to its original presence in London, noting the similarities in both cities' art scenes to London's art scene in 2003, as both cities are considered to be rising in importance in the art world.

Frieze acquired two additional, local art fairs in 2023: The Armory Show in New York, and EXPO Chicago. Both fairs will continue to operate under their independent brands.

In 2025, Frieze announced further expansion to Abu Dhabi through a partnership with the Department of Culture and Tourism – Abu Dhabi. In 2026 Abu Dhabi Art will rebrand as Frieze Abu Dhabi.

== Fairs ==
=== Frieze Art Fair 2003 ===
- Space hire was £180 per meter.
- The fair's income was £990,000 from 5,500 square meters (2,250 rentable).
- Sales were £20 million.
- There were 124 galleries.
- There were 27,700 visitors.
- non-profit programme Frieze Projects initiated with Polly Staple as curator.

=== Frieze Art Fair 2004 ===
- The fair's income from galleries was £1.5 million from 8,000 square meters (4,000 rentable).
- Sales were £26 million.
- There were 150 galleries.
- There were 42,000 visitors.
- Public admission price was £12.
- There were over 1,000 gallery applications for places.
- Booths were 24–120 square meters.
- The fair was sponsored by Deutsche Bank AG.
- US galleries included Gagosian, Zach Feuer Gallery, Matthew Marks, and Barbara Gladstone.
- British galleries included White Cube, Lisson Gallery, and Victoria Miro Gallery.
- European galleries included Hauser & Wirth.
- Galleries came from Beijing, Melbourne, Moscow and Auckland.

=== Frieze Art Fair 2005 ===
- There were 160 galleries.
- 38 exhibitors were American and 35 British.
- Celebrities at the opening included Claudia Schiffer, David Bowie, and Alexander McQueen.
- Tracey Emin launched her book Strangeland to coincide with the 2005 fair.

=== Frieze Art Fair 2006 ===
- October 12–15
- There was a preview on 11 October 2006.
- Mika Rottenberg won the Cartier Award 2006.

=== Frieze Art Fair 2007 ===
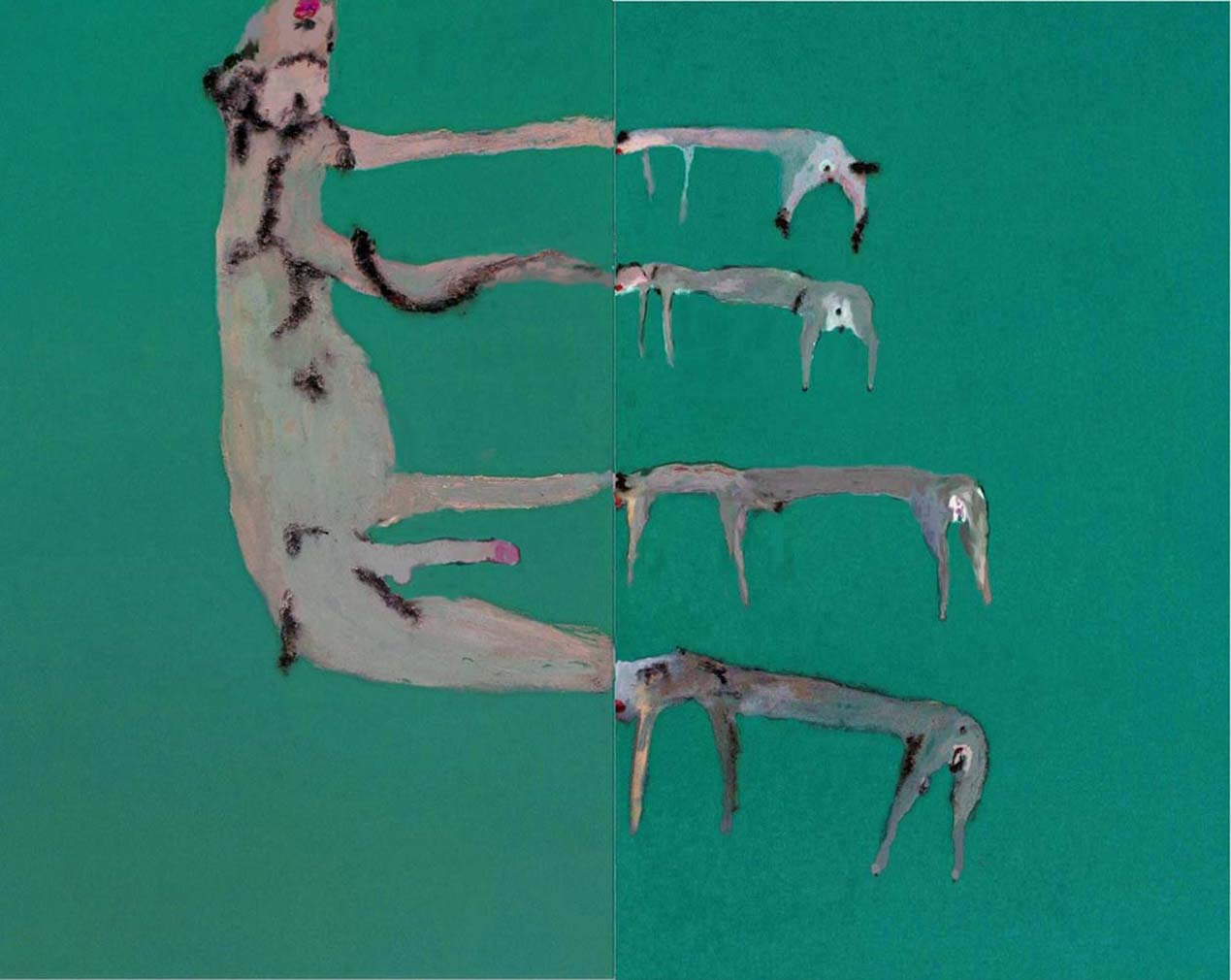
Dog Breeder by Andrew Litten, exhibited during Frieze Art Fair 2007

- October 11–14
- There was a preview for guests including Tracey Emin, Jake and Dinos Chapman, as well as Sam Taylor-Wood.
- Mario Garcia Torres Wins the Cartier Award 2007
- Neville Wakefield becomes curator of Frieze Projects

=== Frieze Art Fair 2008 ===
- October 16–19
- Ticket prices for public entry cost between £15 and £25.
- The fair featured talks by speakers including Carsten Holler, Yoko Ono, and Cosey Fanni Tutti
- The winner of the Cartier Award 2008 was Wilfredo Prieto.

=== Frieze Art Fair 2009 ===
- October 5–18
- Over 1000 artists showcased, 60,000 visitors, 165 galleries from 30 countries
- Curators: Daniel Baumann and Sarah McCrory; the Fair included work by Stephanie Syjuco, Monika Sosnowska, Per Oskar Leu, Ryan Gander, Kim Coleman and Jenny Hogarth
- The sculpture park included work by Paul McCarthy and Vanessa Billy
- The winner of the Cartier Award 2009 was Jordan Wolfson.

=== Frieze Art Fair 2010 ===
- October 14–17
- Frieze Projects was curated by Sarah McCrory with work by Annika Ström, Nick Relph, Shahryar Neshat, Jeffrey Vallance, Spartacus Chetwynd amongst others.
- The sculpture park included work by Jeppe Hein, Slavs and Tatars, Franz West, Hans-Peter Feldmann
- The winner of the Cartier Award 2010 was Simon Fujiwara.

=== Frieze Art Fair 2011 ===
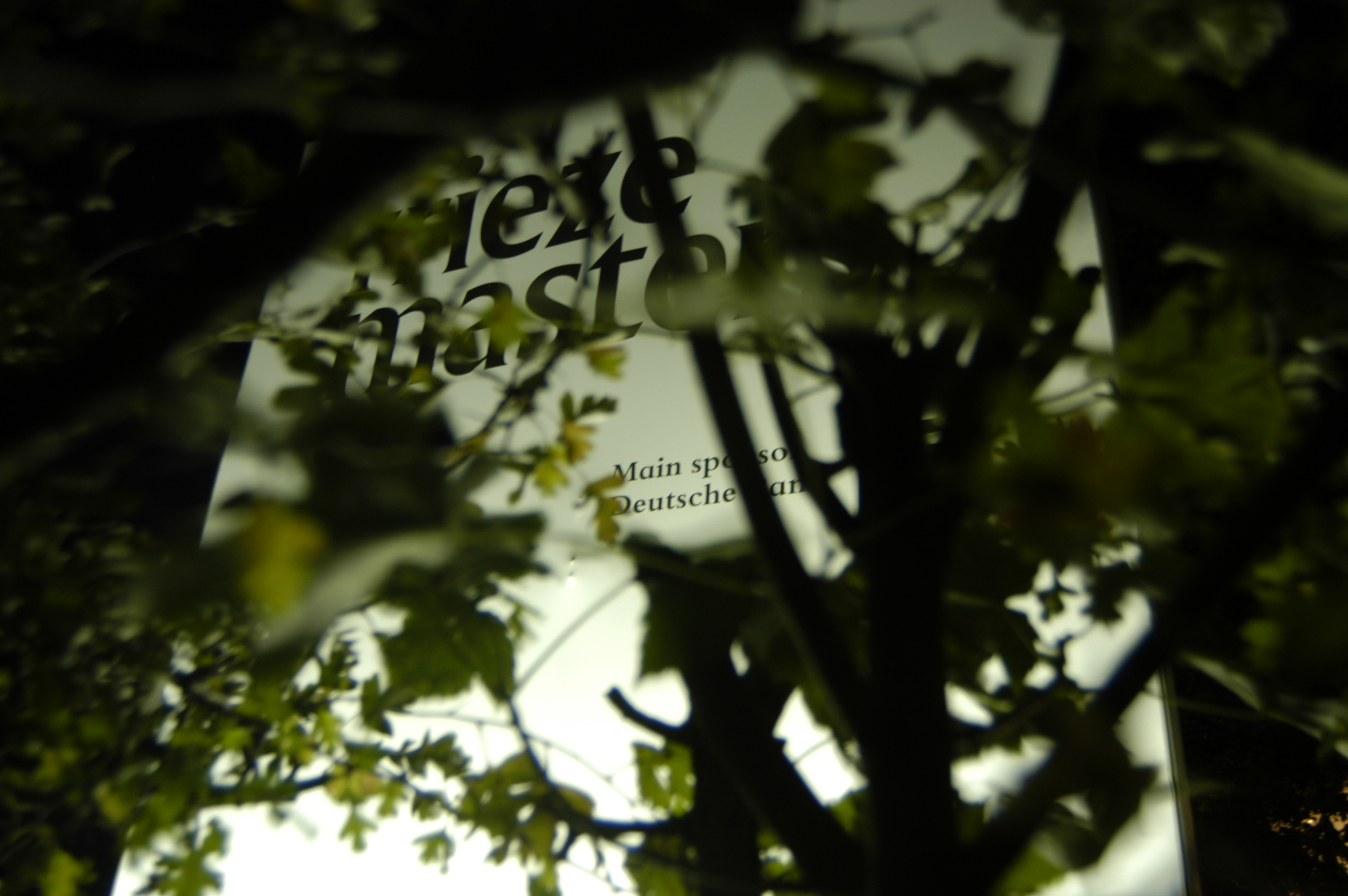
Frieze Masters' sign, 2014. Held by coincidence near the site of the long gone Master of Regent's Park's house.

- October 13–16
- The P.V was on 12 October 2011
- Frieze Projects is curated by Sarah McCrory with work by Bik Van Der Pol, Pierre Huyghe, Christian Jankowski, LuckyPDF, Laure Prouvost, and Cara Tolmie
- The winner of the Emdash Award 2011 was Anahita Razmi.

=== Frieze Art Fair 2012 ===
- October 11–14
- Also the first year for the Frieze Masters and Frieze New York editions.
- Featured 175 leading international contemporary galleries and over 1,000 artists
- Frieze Projects is curated by Sarah McCrory with work by Thomas Bayrle, Aslı Çavuşoğlu, DIS, Grizedale Arts / Yangjiang Group, Joanna Rajkowska.
- The winner of the Emdash Award 2012 was Cécile B. Evans.

=== Frieze Art Fair 2013 ===
- October 17–20
- Featuring 152 galleries from 30 countries.
- 70,000 people attended the fair.
- Pilvi Takala received the Emdash Award 2013
- Nicola Lees becomes Frieze Projects curator

=== Frieze Art Fair 2014 ===
- October 15–18
- 47,000 visitors
- 162 participating galleries from 25 countries
- Mélanie Matranga won the inaugural Frieze Artist Award 2014

=== Frieze Art Fair 2015 ===
- October 14–17
- 164 galleries from 27 different countries participated.
- 55,000 was the number of visitors this year.
- Rachel Rose won the Frieze Artist Award 2015

=== Frieze New York 2016 ===
In 2016, David Horvitz hired a pickpocket to place sculptures in the pockets of attendees of the annual Frieze Art Fair. This was part of “Frieze Projects” a program of 6 commissioned interactive activities at the fair. Said Horvitz, “Imagine how much money is concentrated there, among collectors and galleries—and then there’s this person walking around who’s basically a trained thief,”

=== Frieze Art Fair 2017 ===
- October 5–8

=== Frieze Art Fair 2018 ===
- October 4–7
- Camden Arts Centre Emerging Artist Prize at Frieze won by Wong Ping

=== Frieze Art Fair 2019 ===
- Regents Park
- October 3–6
- 160 exhibitors from 36 countries
- 40,000 square meters

=== Frieze Los Angeles 2019 ===
- Inaugural Los Angeles Edition
- February 15–17
- Presented at Paramount Pictures Studios

=== Frieze New York 2020 ===
- Cancelled in light of global health concerns regarding COVID-19 (coronavirus)

=== Frieze Art Fair 2021 ===
- Regents Park
- October 13–17
- 159 exhibitors
- £524 per square meter, £241-£338 per square meter in Focus

=== Frieze Masters Art Fair 2021 ===
- Regents Park
- October 13–17
- 132 exhibitors
- £631 per square meter

=== Frieze New York 2021 ===
- The Shed Manhattan
- May 5–9
- 64 exhibitors
- Admission $55–$265

=== Frieze Seoul 2022 ===
- COEX World Trade Center
- September 2–5
- 110 exhibitors

=== Frieze New York 2023 ===
- The Shed Manhattan
- May 17–21, 2023
- 68 Exhibitors
- Frieze Artadia Prize Introduced
  - Winner: Jessica Vaughn

=== Frieze Seoul 2023 ===
- COEX World Trade Center
- September 6–9, 2023
- 121 exhibitors

=== Frieze Seoul 2024 ===
- COEX World Trade Center
- September 4–7, 2024
- 110 exhibitors

== Frieze Sculpture Park ==
The Frieze Sculpture Park has been curated since 2012 by Clare Lilley of Yorkshire Sculpture Park, with historic pieces joining the contemporary collection.

== Outset / Frieze Art Fair Fund to benefit the Tate Collection ==
Outset Contemporary Art Fund was founded by Candida Gertler and Yana Peel in 2003 as a philanthropic organization dedicated to supporting new art. The charitable foundation focuses on bringing private funding from its supporters and trustees to public museums, galleries, and art projects. In 2003, Outset established the world's first acquisitions fund connected to an art fair. This ongoing collaboration with Tate and Frieze proved to be a cornerstone in the foundation's program of institutional acquisitions.

== See also ==
- Art Basel – Series of annual art fairs held by a Switzerland-based organization
- Art Cologne – Annual art fair in Cologne, Germany
- Design Miami – International design fair
- EXPO Chicago – Annual international art exhibition
- Frieze – Contemporary art magazine
- London Design Festival – Annual arts event in the United Kingdom
- The Armory Show – Art fair in New York City
