= Jessica Vaughn =

American sculptor and installation artist

- Born: 1983 (age 42–43); Chicago, Illinois
- Education: Carnegie Mellon University; University of Pennsylvania

Jessica Vaughn (born 1983) is an American sculptor and installation artist. She primarily employs the use of discarded materials to engage with histories of site and mass production.

== Education ==
Vaughn received a degree in Social History and Art from Carnegie Mellon University in 2006 and a Master of Fine Arts with an emphasis on Time Based Media from the University of Pennsylvania in 2011. She is an alumna of the Whitney Museum of American Art’s Independent Study Program as well as the Skowhegan School of Painting and Sculpture. The programs were completed in 2013 and 2015 respectively.

== Career ==
Vaughn's most recent work is titled The Internet of Things. Vaughn is the first recipient of the Frieze Artadia Prize, a new initiative between Frieze New York and Artadia. Vaughn's commission explores the structures that exist and proliferate under what she terms late-stage capitalism. Using the US Postal System as a vehicle to explore sites of publicized violence, commerce, and entertainment; Vaughn sent letters to sites such as Disneyland, malls, public parks, and the site of Trayvon Martin's death. The trace of the letter's journey through the mail system is the point of departure for works in the exhibition.

In 2021 Vaughn was the recipient of a Creative Capital grant for a project called Working Procedures. The project remains in progress and explores the common structures that direct our understanding of resource circulation in institutions, labor, and space.

In 2019 Vaughn was awarded a grant from the Graham Foundation to complete the work Depreciating Assets: Variable Dimensions. Vaughn, published her first book under the same title with Printed Matter in 2021. The text continues themes of her practice including labor, corporate office culture, and the effects of diversity practices in the workplace. The book includes photo copies of governmental reports, images of stacked postal mail bins, and documents relating to Vaughn's own past employment.

Vaughn was the subject of a solo show at The ICA Philadelphia in 2021. The exhibition, which was also supported in part by the Graham foundation, was curated by Meg Onli. Our Primary Focus Is To Be Successful included sculptures, photographs, video, and paintings. The presentation juxtaposes the effects and forces of minimalism as an aesthetic influence on modular office planning and affirmative action and labor integration policies on the culture of the workplace.
