= Matthew Slotover =

British publisher

- Born: December 1968 (age 57); London, United Kingdom
- Occupations: Entrepreneur, publisher
- Known for: Co-founding art and media company Frieze
- Spouse: Emily King

Matthew Slotover OBE (born 1968) is an English publisher and entrepreneur. He co-founded Frieze, a media and events company that has a focus on the art scene and that also produces the annual Frieze Art Fair. in 2021 he co-founded Toklas restaurant, London, and in 2022 he opened Fort Road Hotel, Margate.

== Early life ==
Slotover was born in London and grew up in South Kensington. He attended St Paul's School, London and then studied Psychology at Oxford University.

His paternal family (originally the Zlotovers) emigrated from Lithuania in the 1930s and settled in Newcastle. Slotover's father, Robert Slotover manages classical musicians including the composer Sir Harrison Birtwistle; his mother Jill Slotover is a children's book editor. Matthew's maternal grandfather, Richard Kravitz was an American magazine publisher who introduced Esquire and DC Comics to the UK.

He first became interested in contemporary art after visiting the YBA art exhibition Modern Medicine, in 1990.

== Life and career ==
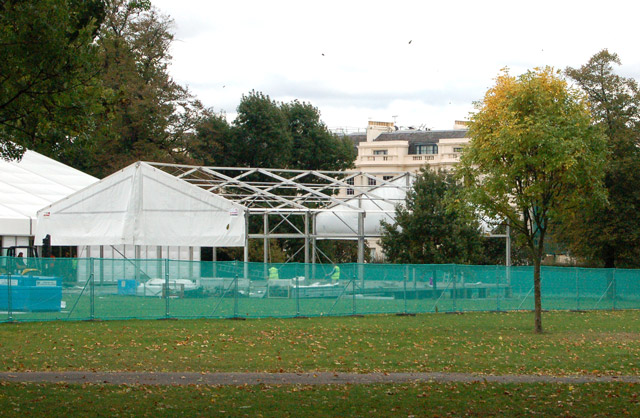
Marquees being erected in Regents Park in early October 2009 for the Frieze Art Fair

Slotover launched Frieze in June 1991 with Tom Gidley as co-editor. The pilot issue featured the first ever magazine interview with Damien Hirst, with a detail of a Hirst butterfly painting on the cover. Amanda Sharp joined Frieze in July 1991. In 1999, he founded Counter Editions, a low-cost, high-volume edition company, with Carl Freedman and Neville Wakefield.

Slotover is chair of Margate's Turner Contemporary, and serves on the board of Sadlers Wells. In 2021 with Caius Pawson he co-founded Murmur, a charity to combat the climate crisis via the arts.

He was a judge on the Turner Prize in 2000. And in 1993, he curated a section of the Aperto at the Venice Biennale, which included Damien Hirst, Mat Collishaw and Rirkrit Tiravanija.

Through Frieze, Slotover published the books: What the Butler Saw - The Selected Writings of Stuart Morgan; All Tomorrow's Parties - Photographs of Andy Warhol’s Factory, by Billy Name; and Designed by Peter Saville, a retrospective of Saville's graphic design.

In 2009, Slotover received an honorary degree from University of the Arts London.

In 2010, Slotover debated whether "art fairs are about money" with Louisa Buck, Matthew Collings, and Jasper Joffe for the motion and against the motion Norman Rosenthal, Richard Wentworth, Matthew Slotover. Joffe claims that his criticisms of Frieze Art Fair led to his work being banned from the fair in 2010. Frieze replied that Resonance FM had hung a number of works, including Joffe's, against their agreement with the fair, and that to ensure a high quality level, artworks in the fair are included only via the galleries in the fair who are selected by the selection committee.

In 2010, Slotover and Sharp were placed jointly at number 41 in the ArtReview "Power 100", a list of influential people in fine arts.

In May 2011, Slotover and Sharp announced the launch of two new art fairs - Frieze New York, and Frieze Masters. Frieze Los Angeles was launched in 2019, followed by Frieze Seoul in 2021. Frieze is now owned by Endeavor.

Slotover and Sharp were both appointed Officer of the Order of the British Empire (OBE) in the 2012 New Year Honours for services to the visual arts.

In 2021 he co-founded Toklas restaurant, London, with Frieze co-founder Amanda Sharp.

In 2022 he opened Fort Road Hotel, Margate with Gabriel Chipperfield and Tom Gidley.

== Personal life ==
Slotover is married to design historian Emily King.

In April 2017, the couple unsuccessfully applied for planning permission to build a townhouse just off Barnsbury Square in Islington, North London. They would have had to make a £50,000 contribution to affordable housing in the borough, if the plans had been approved, but the application was rejected on the grounds that the plans constituted an under-use of the land, and over concerns regarding the destruction of nearby trees. In 2019 the planning rejection was overturned on appeal.
