= Amanda Sharp =

Amanda Sharp (born in 1969) is an English publisher and entrepreneur, who joined Frieze in July 1991 and, with Matthew Slotover, co-founded Frieze Art Fair in October 2003.

== Life and career ==
Sharp grew up in London, where at the age of 12 she met Frieze co-founder Matthew Slotover at a bar mitzva. She encountered Slotover again at Oxford University, where both were studying, dabbling in writing and editing for university publications.

Slotover launched Frieze magazine in June 1991, which Sharp joined in July that year. They co-founded Frieze Art Fair in October 2003, expanding it to New York in 2011. The duo were both appointed as Officers of the Order of the British Empire (OBE) in the 2012 New Year Honours List for services to the visual arts.
