= Nicola Lees =

British curator and museum director

- Born: London, United Kingdom
- Education: Goldsmiths College (BA); Royal College of Art (MA)
- Occupations: Museum director, curator

Nicola Lees is a British art curator and museum director. She is currently the Nancy and Bob Magoon Artistic Director and CEO of the Aspen Art Museum in Aspen, Colorado. Prior to the Aspen Art Museum, she held leadership and curatorial roles at institutions including 80 Washington Square East at New York University, Frieze Foundation, Serpentine Gallery, and Irish Museum of Modern Art.

== Early life and education ==
Lees was born and raised in London. She holds a BA with honors in Fine Art and Art History from Goldsmiths College, London, and an MA in Curating Contemporary Art from the Royal College of Art, London.

== Career ==
=== Irish Museum of Modern Art ===
Lees began her career at the Irish Museum of Modern Art (IMMA), where she worked on exhibitions featuring artists including Philippe Parreno, Miroslaw Balka, Nalini Malani, Alex Katz, Georgia O'Keeffe, Alexander Calder, and Joan Miró.

=== Serpentine Galleries ===
From 2008 to 2013, Lees was Senior Curator of Public Programs at the Serpentine Galleries. She launched Serpentine Cinema and co-curated the Serpentine Marathon series.

=== Frieze Foundation ===
Between 2013 and 2015, Lees was the Curator at the Frieze Foundation commissioning over 40 site-specific works and collaborating with organizations like the Liverpool Biennial.

=== 80 Washington Square East ===
Between 2016 and 2020, Lees was Director and Curator at 80 Washington Square East Galleries at New York University. She organized exhibitions featuring artists including Duane Linklater, Lyle Ashton Harris, Lutz Bacher, Diamond Stingily, John Giorno, Harun Farocki, and Louise Lawler.

=== Aspen Art Museum ===
Lees joined the Aspen Art Museum as artistic director and CEO in 2020. The museum has since hosted exhibitions with artists including John Chamberlain, Nairy Baghramian (2023), Precious Okoyomon (2021–2022), Andy Warhol (2021–2022).

In 2025, Lees announced AIR, a 10-year, $20 million initiative to elevate artists' role as leaders. AIR launched in July 2025 with a closed-door, artist-only retreat, followed by a public festival, which included keynote addresses, interdisciplinary dialogues, newly commissioned work, and performances. Participating artists included Matthew Barney, Werner Herzog, Caroline Polachek, Maya Lin, and Paul Chan.

Lees also reintroduced the Youth Art Expo, a biannual exhibition that gathers over 1,000 artworks made by K-12 grade students from the Extended Roaring Fork Valley and includes mentorship opportunities with internationally recognized artists.
