= Keiji Uematsu =

Japanese sculptor (born 1947)

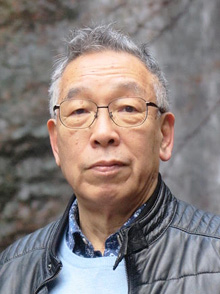
- 2021@Minoo-park
- Born: March 26, 1947 (age 79); Kobe, Japan
- Education: Department of Fine Arts, Kobe University
- Known for: Sculpture, Contemporary Art
- Notable work: Cutting Axis-Longitude-Latitude
- Awards: the 38th Teijiro Nakahara Award, Japan, 2013
- Elected: Japan's representative artist of the 43rd Venice Biennale, 1988

Keiji Uematsu (born 1947) is a Japanese sculptor and contemporary artist.

== Biography ==
=== From boyhood to Univ. ===
Keiji Uematsu was born on March 26, 1947, in Kobe, Japan. His father drew illustrations and lettered in the printing factory. His eldest son died shortly after birth, Keiji was the second first son grew up watching his job, and the next son Eiji later became an artist using soil as a material. Keiji loved painting and making models, and reading the science magazine for the schoolkids also. He became interested in the wonders of science, went often to the museums of the science or the natural history. He thought he wanted to grasp the mechanism of the wonder of the earth or the space from the primitive perspective. This is related to his later artistic work. His father did not allow him to go on to art college, so he entered the art department of the Faculty of Education, Kobe University, graduated in 1969, became a teacher of the arts and crafts at a public school.

=== Beginning of artist activity ===
While teaching at the public elementary school and the technical high school, he created his own artworks and presented Transparence - Iron at the 1st Contemporary International Sculpture Exhibition (The Hakone Open-air Museum, Kanagawa, 1969). In the same year he held his first solo exhibition at Galerie 16 in Kyoto, presented Tranceparence - H_{2}O. He also exhibited at the Kyoto Biennale 1972.

=== Leap overseas ===
He was selected for Japan: Tradition und Genenwart exhibition (Städtische Kunsthalle Düsseldorf, Düsseldorf), sent the work in 1974, October he received the 2nd Kobe City Cultural Encouragement Award. He also appeared in a small role of the famous indie film I Can't Wait Getting Dark! (directed by Kazuki Ohmori). In September 1975 he went to West Germany for the destination of Düsseldorf, where the activities of artists are active. From December 1976 to 1977 he held the first solo exhibition in Europe Skulptur, Foto, Video, Film (Moderna Museet Stockholm, Sweden). Since then, he has presented many works at museums and galleries in Europe. His first solo exhibition in N.Y. Installation, Axis-Latitude-Longitude was held in 1981 at P.S.1 (the annex of MoMA). He was invited by Fondation Cartier pour L'Art, and exhibited at Sculptures in Paris from 1985 to 1986 the open-air work Situation-Triangle for the first time in 14 years. After this he produced many open-air sculptures in Europe, Japan and South Korea.

=== Dual base of artist's life ===
He established a new base in Nishinomiya, Kobe in March 1986, since then he continued to work going back and forth between West Germany and Japan. Due to the Great Hanshin-Awaji Earthquake in 1995 he lost Nishinomiya base, moved to Minoo-city of Osaka. He was selected as a Japanese national artist along with Shigeo Toya and Katsura Funakoshi, for the 43rd Venice Biennale 1988, presented his work Inversion-Vertical space at the Japan Pavilion. In the 1990s he continued vigorous production activities. His first solo exhibition in a Japanese museum Behind the Perception was held at Otani Memorial Museum, Nishinomiya, 1997.

=== Activities of the new century ===
In 2003 at Kitakyushu Municipal Museum of Art, he was held solo exhibition of photo works mainly Thinking about the Body and Eyes: Photos, Films from the 70's to the Present. In 2006 at Otani Memorial Museum, Nishinomiya the exhibition Keiji Uematsu, The Garden of Time was held. Even in the 21st century, he continues to hold solo exhibitions almost twice a year. In 2013, he won the 38th Teijiro Nakahara Award for his work Cutting Axis-Longitude-Latitude. He was selected for Spotlight category of the art fair of London Frieze Masters 2014, presented the 1970's photo works and sculputures. In 2016 he exhibited his works at Tate Modern, London Performing for the Camera and solo at Simon Lee Gallery Invisible Force. In 2021, for the first time in 15 years at the Japanese museum he presented the new works Keiji Uematsu: Ways of Touching the Invisible - Intuition at Ashiya City Museum of Art and History.

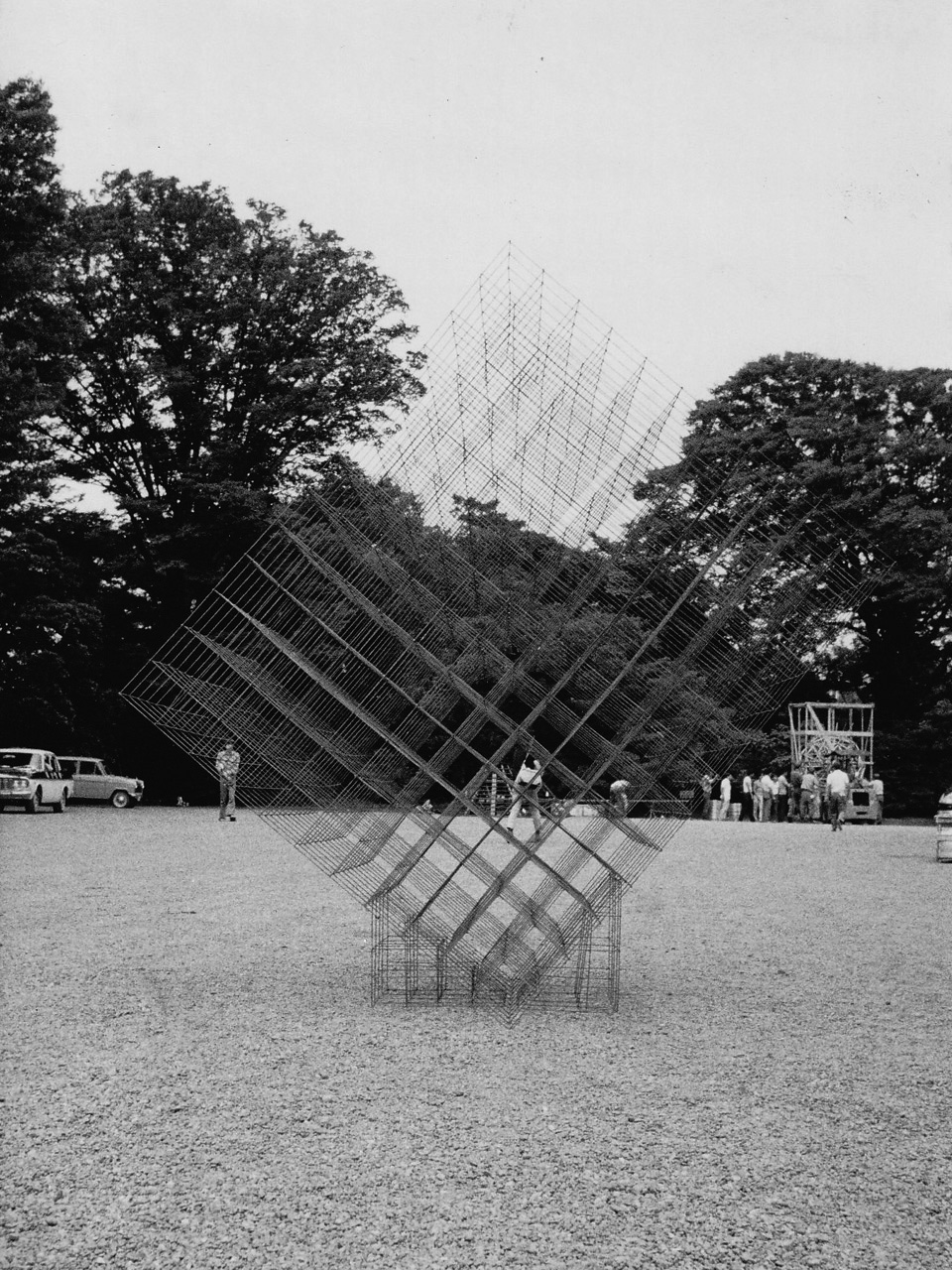
Transparence-Iron, 1969.

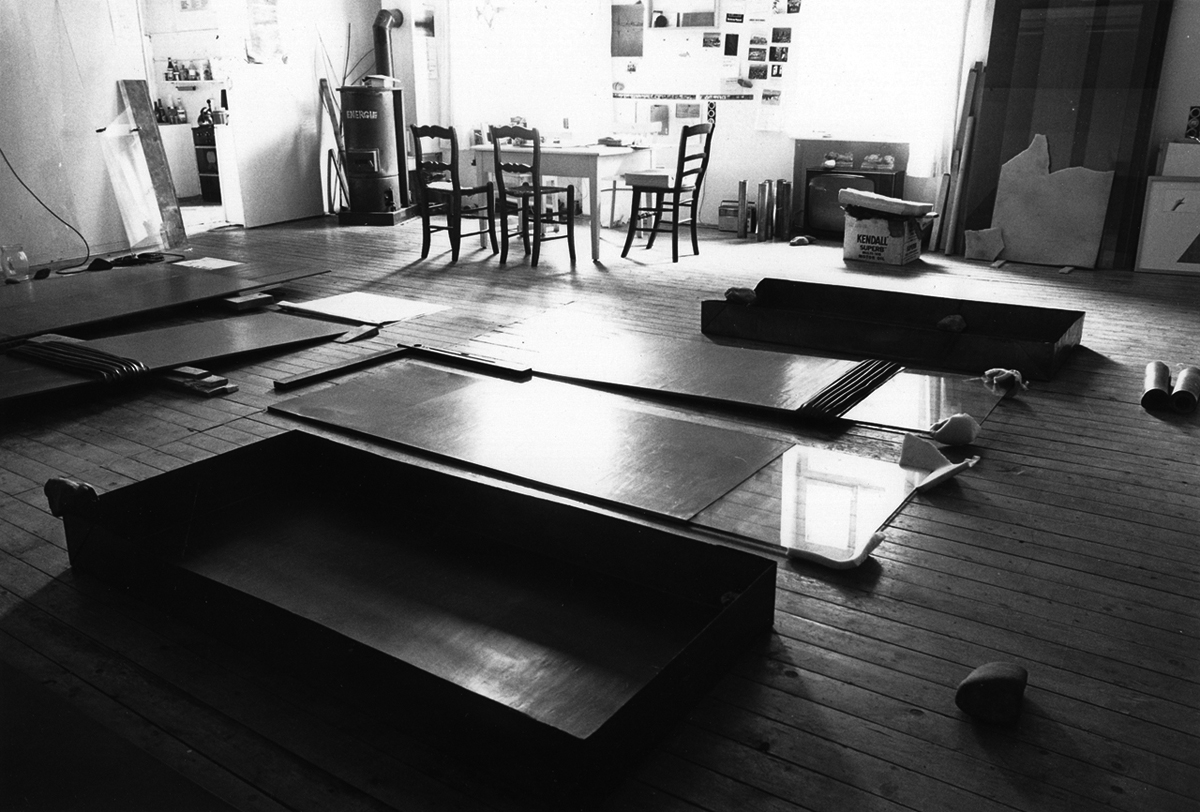
Studio, Düsseldorf, 1977.

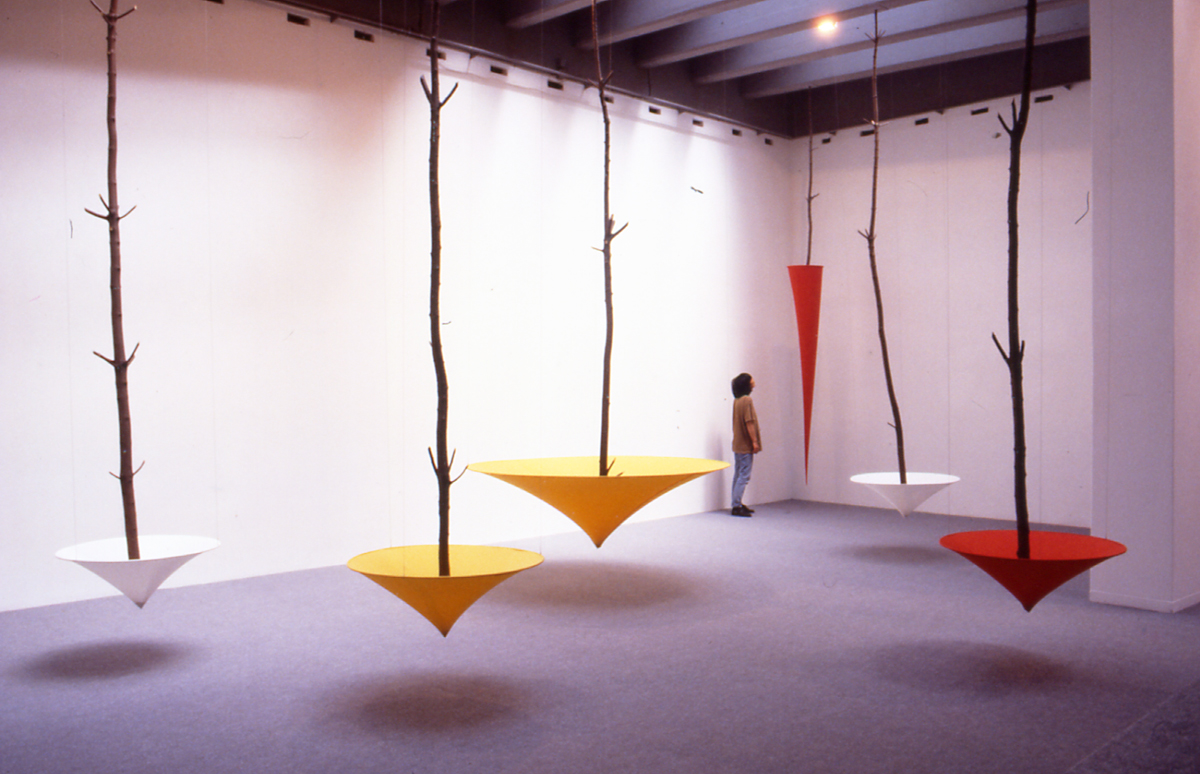
Inversion - Vertical space, 1988.

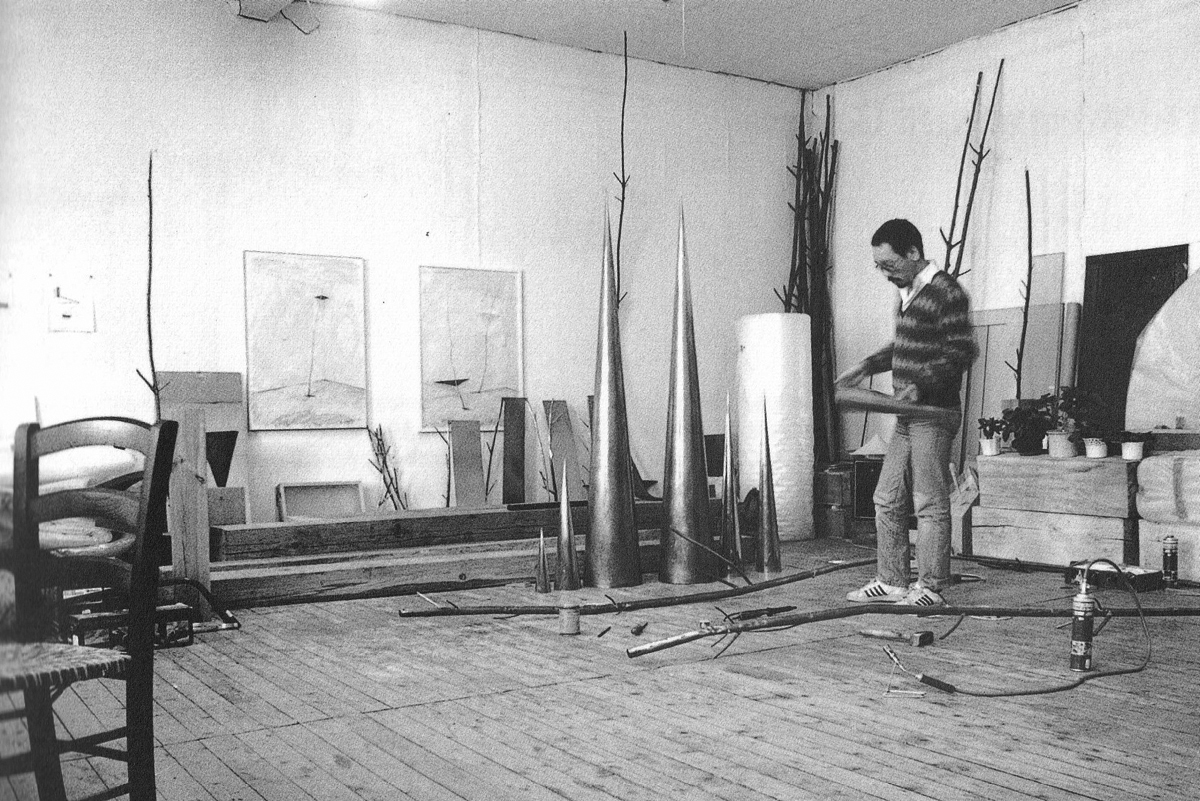
Studio, Düsseldorf, 1991.

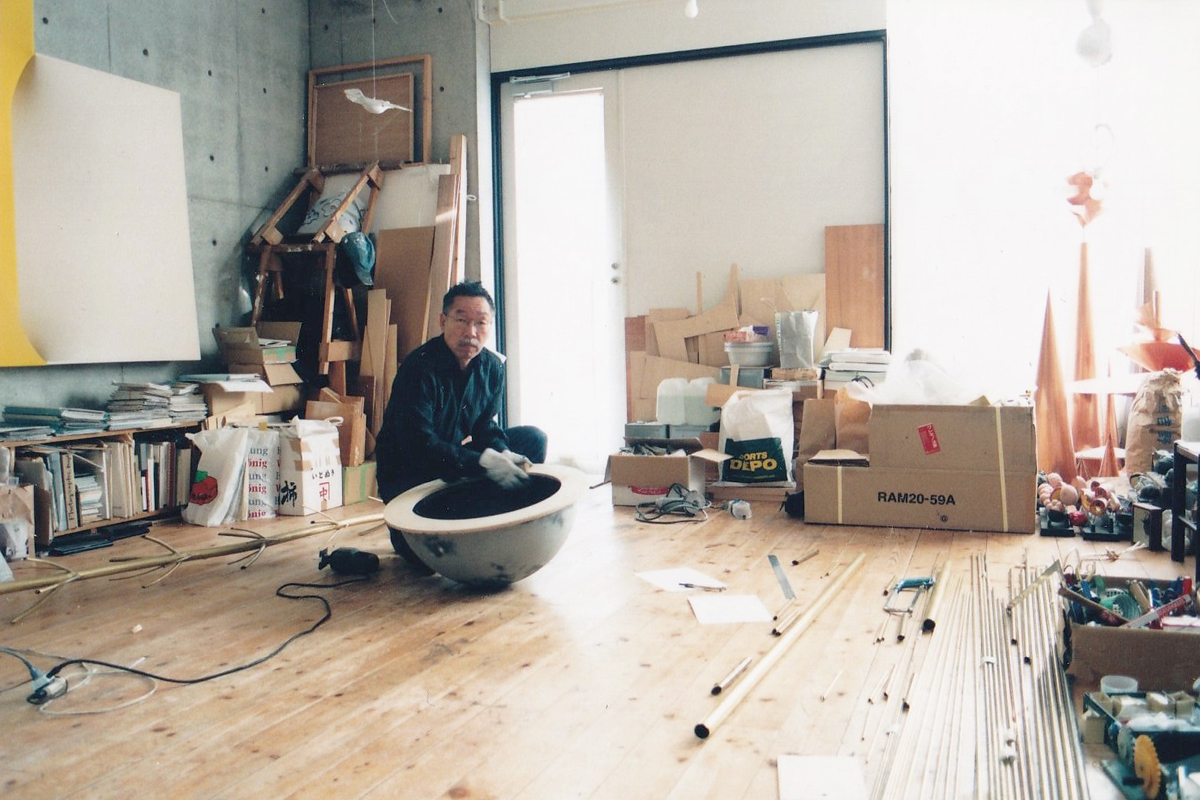
Studio, Minoo, 2006.

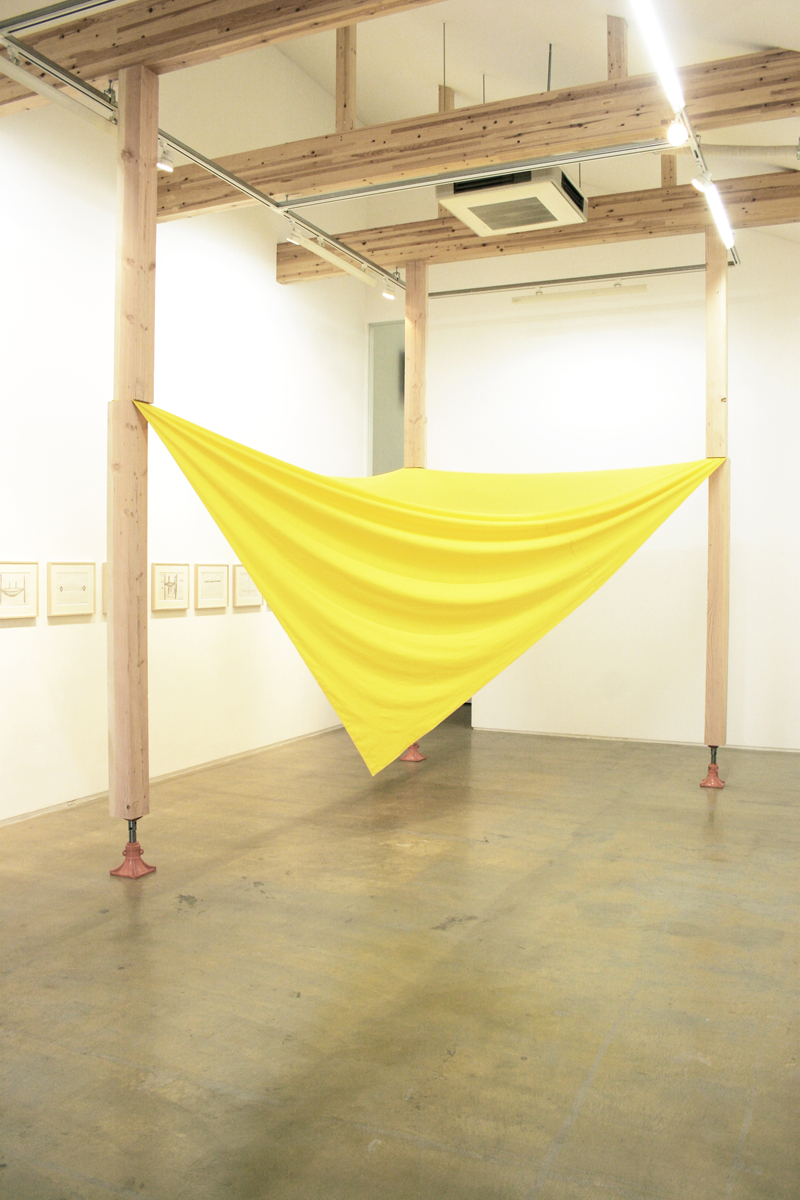
Cutting Axis-Latitude-Longitude, 2012.

== Style and methods ==
His works are expressed in a variety of ways, including images (photographs, films, videos), performances (and their image recordings), prints, sculptures, and installations.

The production of the work is called "job (= project)", and the drawing that describes the idea of the project is also presented as an independent work.
His work of sculpture or installation is a seemingly unstable structure that combines geometric volumes (cones, spirals) of stone, copper, wood, etc. "I want to express the existence of something invisible, like the universe, with a work in which the entire structure would collapse without one element."

As materials for sculptures and installation works, cloth, stone, glass, iron, stainless steel, copper, bronze, brass, lumber (mainly Douglas fir), and natural wood in their solid state are often used.

His style looks like an abstract, but what is expressed in his work is the embodiment of invisible forces such as gravity.

First in 1971, then in 1972, or even in 1991, he wrote: "What I want to do is to make visible existence, visible connections and visible relations appear more clearly. And to cause non-visible existence, non-visible connections and non-visible relations to appear. And to cause visible existence, visible connections and visible relations not to appear.", "What shall I now do with the world (cosmos) which denies man understanding and where these three relations comprise antinomies? Shall I find a new meaning in the world? How to shape relations between people? These are questions which deeply concern me."

These words expresses the basic concept from the earliest days of his artist's activities.

== Exhibitions ==
=== Select solo exhibitions ===
- 1974: Photographs and Films, Gallery Cheap Thrills, Helsinki, Finland
- 1975: Galerie St. Petri, Lund, Sweden
- 1976: Photographs and Films, Gallery Cheap Thrills, Helsinki, Finland
- 1976: Moderna museet, Stockholm, Sweden
- 1977: Hetzler+Keller gallery, Stuttgart, Germany
- 1977: Situation Interval, New Reform, Aalst, Belgium
- 1977: Ausschnitte 1, Städtische Kunsthalle Düsseldorf, Germany
- 1979: Installation, Vor Ort Arbeitsgalerie, Hamburg, Germany
- 1979: Skulptur, Foto, Heidelberger Kunstverein, Germany
- 1980: Cultuurhuis de Warande, Turnhout, Belgium
- 1980: International cultural Center, Antwerp, Belgium
- 1980: Städtische Galerie im Lenbachhaus+Kunstform, München, Germany
- 1980: Installation Axis-Latitude-Longitude, P.S.1, Project Studios 1, New York, USA
- 1981: Installations and Drawings, Baudoin Lebon, Paris, France
- 1981: Skupturen-Zeichnungen-Fotos, Galerie Löhrl, Mönchengladbach, Germany
- 1982: Cathédrale Saint-Trophime d'Arles, Arles, France
- 1983: Installation, Baudoin Lebon, Paris, France
- 1984: Centrum BeeldendeKunst Rotterdam, The Netherlands
- 1985: Project - Drawings and Installations, Galerie Löhrl, Mönchengladbach, Germany
- 1986: Installation, Baudoin Lebon, Paris, France
- 1989: Project, Kunstraum Neuss, Germany
- 1989: Skulpturen und Zeichnungen, Galerie Kiki Maier-Hahn, Düsseldorf, Germany
- 1989: Skulpturen und Zeichnungen, Galerie Löhrl, Mönchengladbach, Germany
- 1989: GeleZaal, Gent, Belgium
- 1990: Sculptures, Waβermann Galerie, München, Germany
- 1991: Dortmunder Kunstverein, Germany
- 1991: Waβermann Galerie, Köln, Germany
- 1991: Baudoin Lebon in FIAC, Grand - Palais, Paris, France
- 1992: Baudoin Lebon, Paris, France
- 1992: Ursula Blickle Stiftung, Kraichtal, Germany
- 1993: The Breathing Space, Waβermann Galerie, München, Germany
- 1993: Skulpturen und Zeichnungen, Galerie Löhrl, Mönchengladbach, Germany
- 1994: It's Possible, Skulpturen und Zeichnungen, Stadtmuseum Siegburg, Germany
- 1995: Invisible Structure, Galerie Beatrice Wassermann, München, Germany
- 1997: Behind the Perception, Edwin-Scharff-Haus, Neu-Ulm, Germany
- 2001: Baudoin Lebon, Paris, France
- 2003: Axis-Latitude-Longitude, Waβermann Galerie, Munchen, Germany
- 2004: Falling Water - Rising Water, Baudoin Lebon, Paris, France
- 2005: Axis-Latitude-Longitude, Kunstlerverein Marlkasten, Düsseldorf, Germany
- 2008: Yearning for What is Floating, Baudoin Lebon, Paris, France
- 2009: Yearning for What is Floating, Le Cafe Francais Art Gallery, Brussels, Belgium
- 2011: Baudoin Lebon (with vladimir skoda), Paris, France
- 2014: Frieze Masters: Spotlight, Regent's Park, London, UK
- 2016: Invisible Force and Seeing, Jacobihaus, Kunstlerverein Malkasten, Düsseldorf, Germany
- 2016: Invisible Force, Simon Lee Gallery, London, UK
- 2016: Seeing/Measuring/..., Baudoin Lebon, Paris, France
- 2018: Invisible Force, Galerie Löhrl, Mönchengladbach, Germany
- 2019: Keiji Uematsu: Invisible Force, Simon Lee Gallery, New York, USA

== Works ==
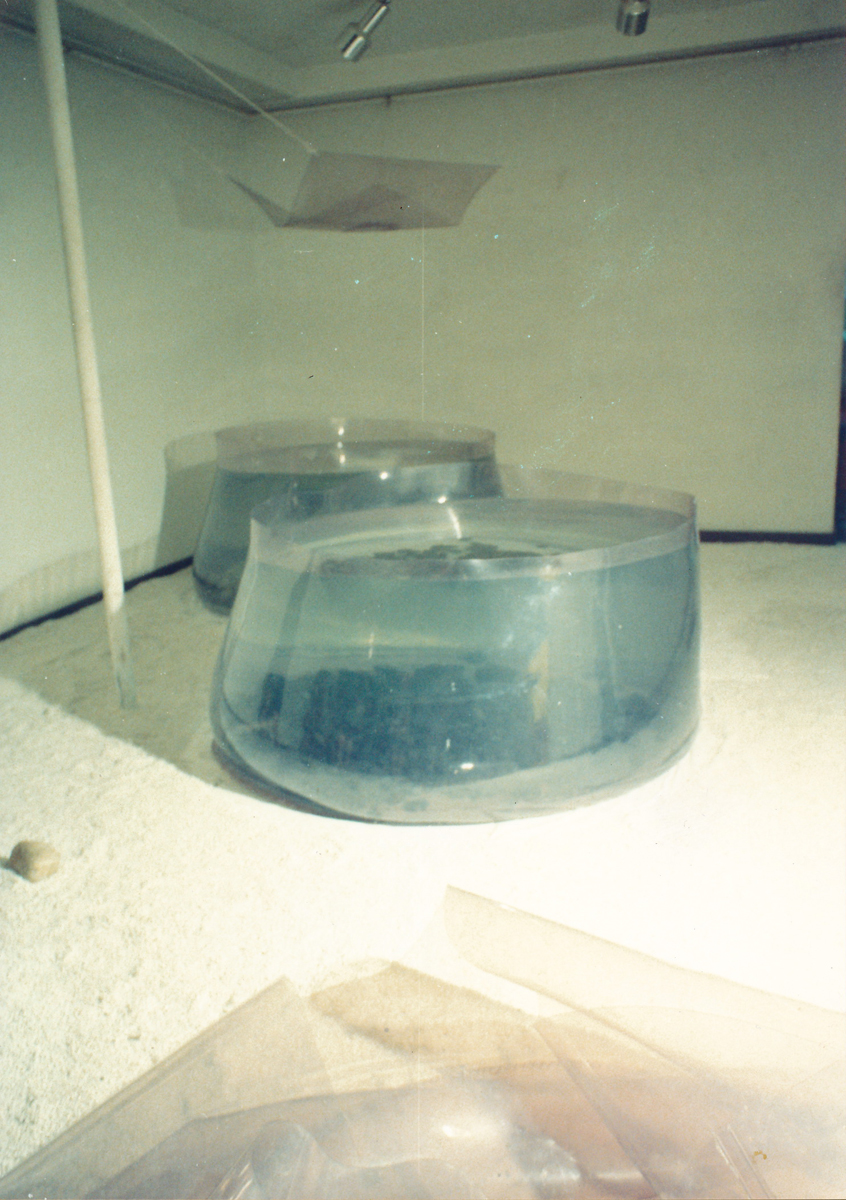
Transparence-H_{2}O, 1969.

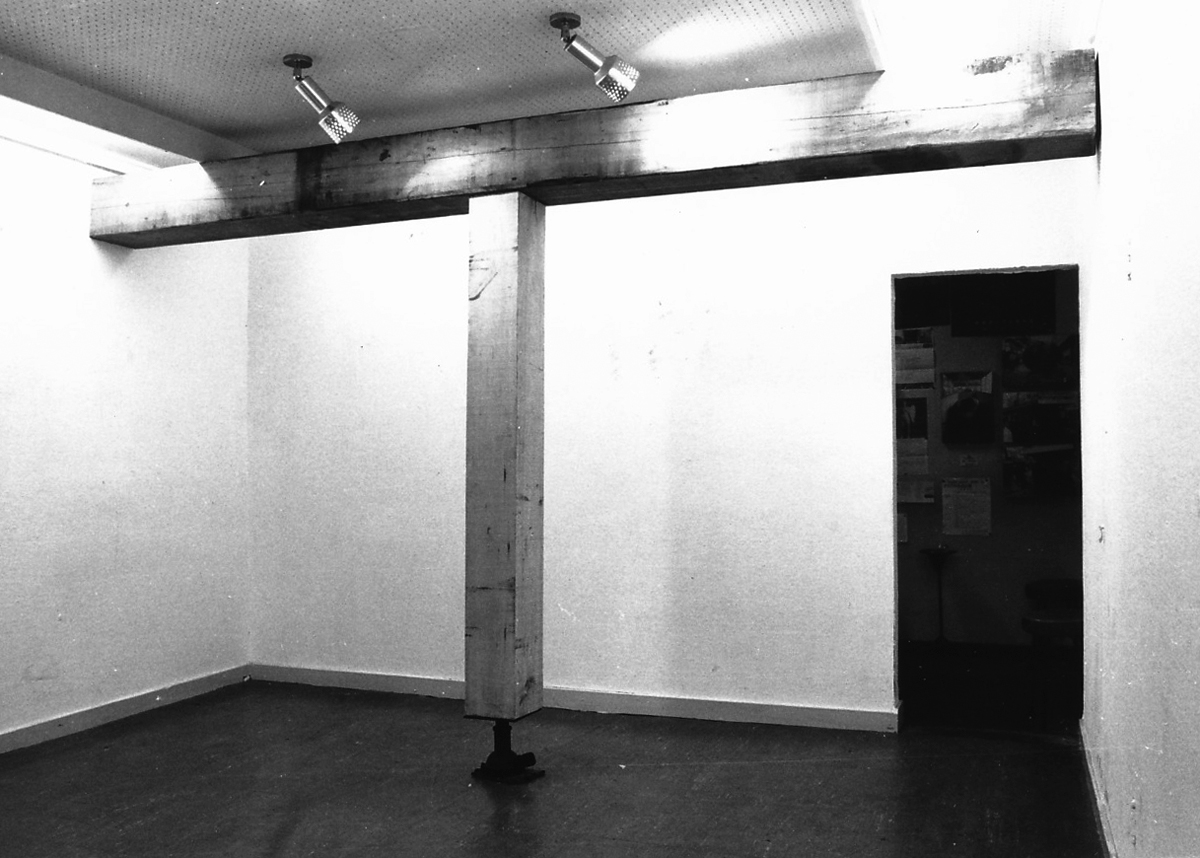
Cutting, 1971.

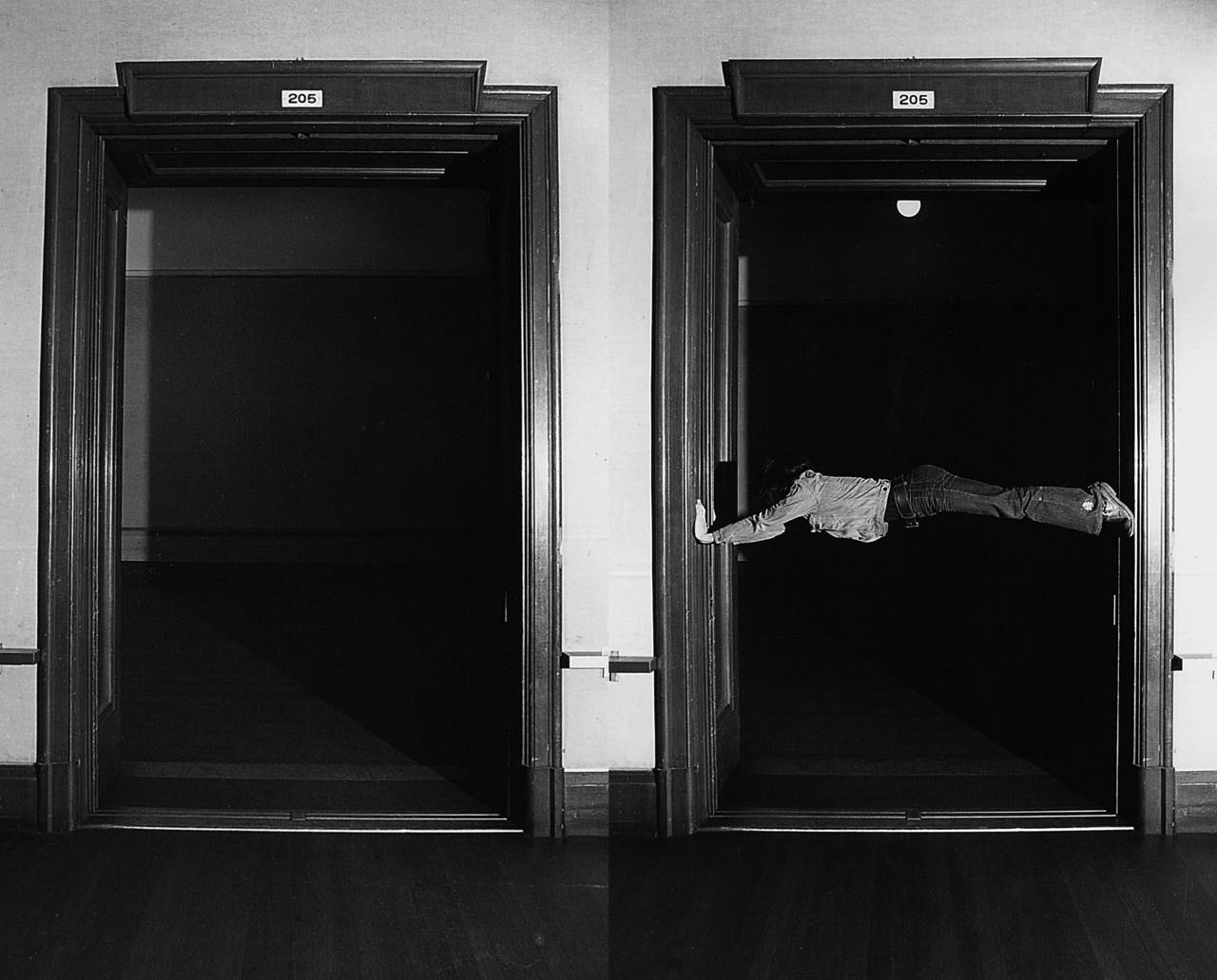
Horizontal position, 1973.

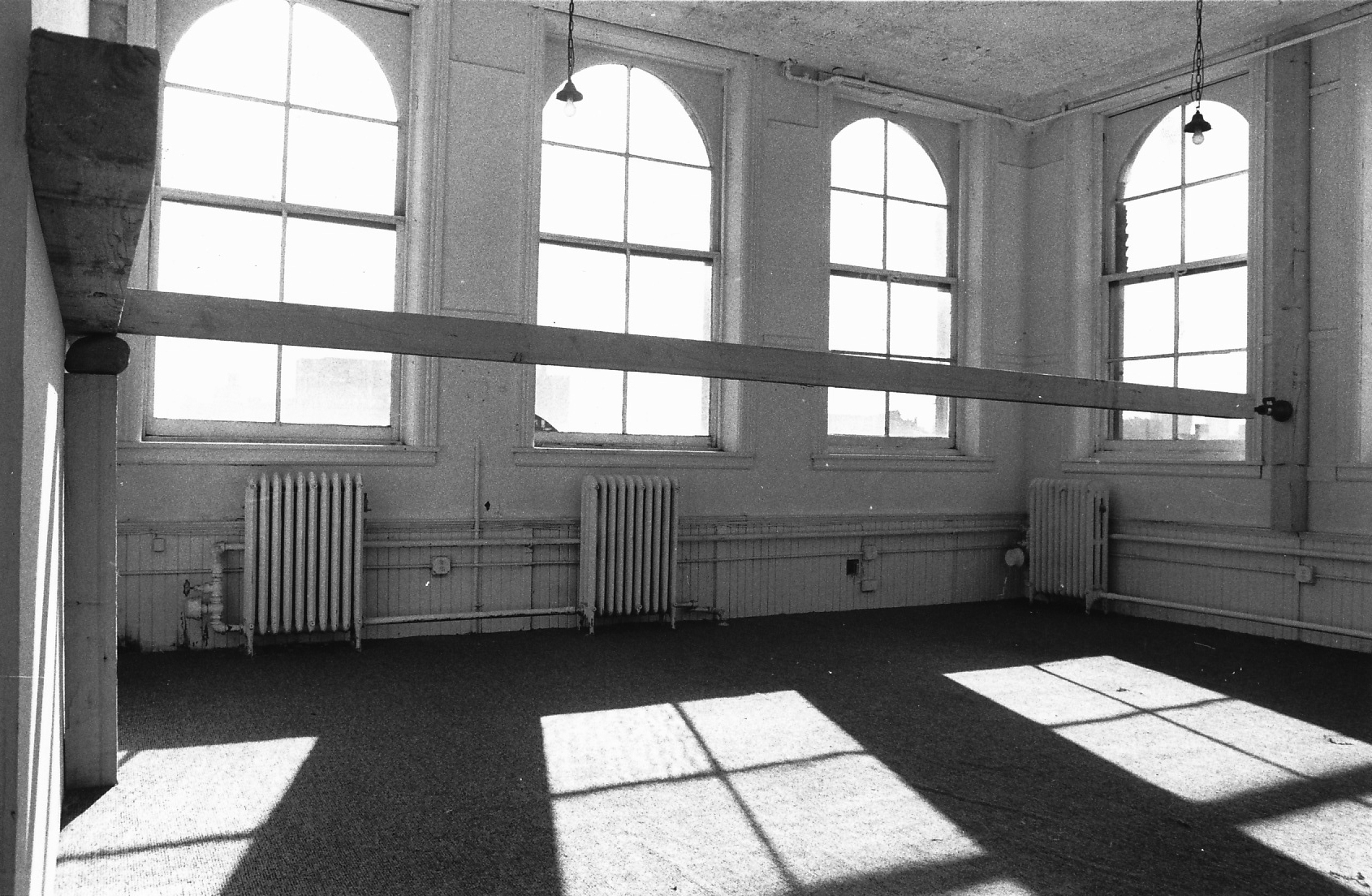
Axis-Latitude-Longitude, 1980.

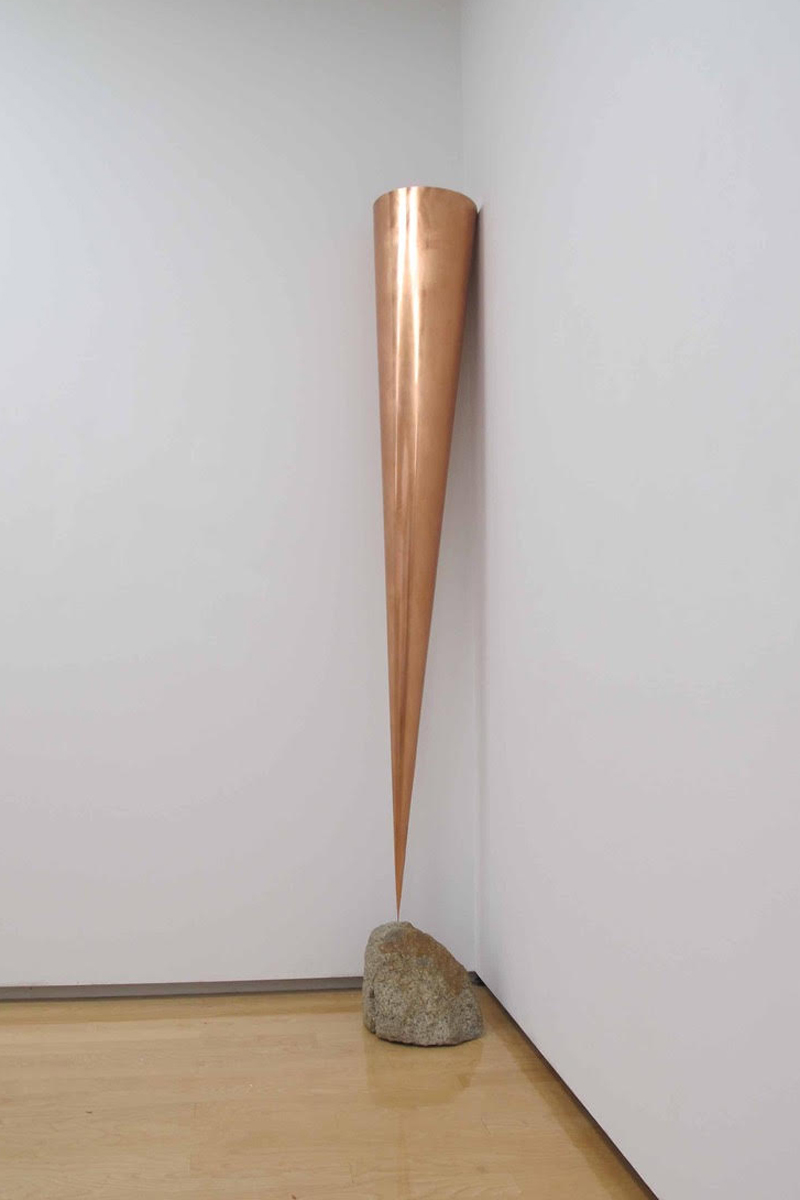
Corner piece I - Inversion vertical space, 1988.

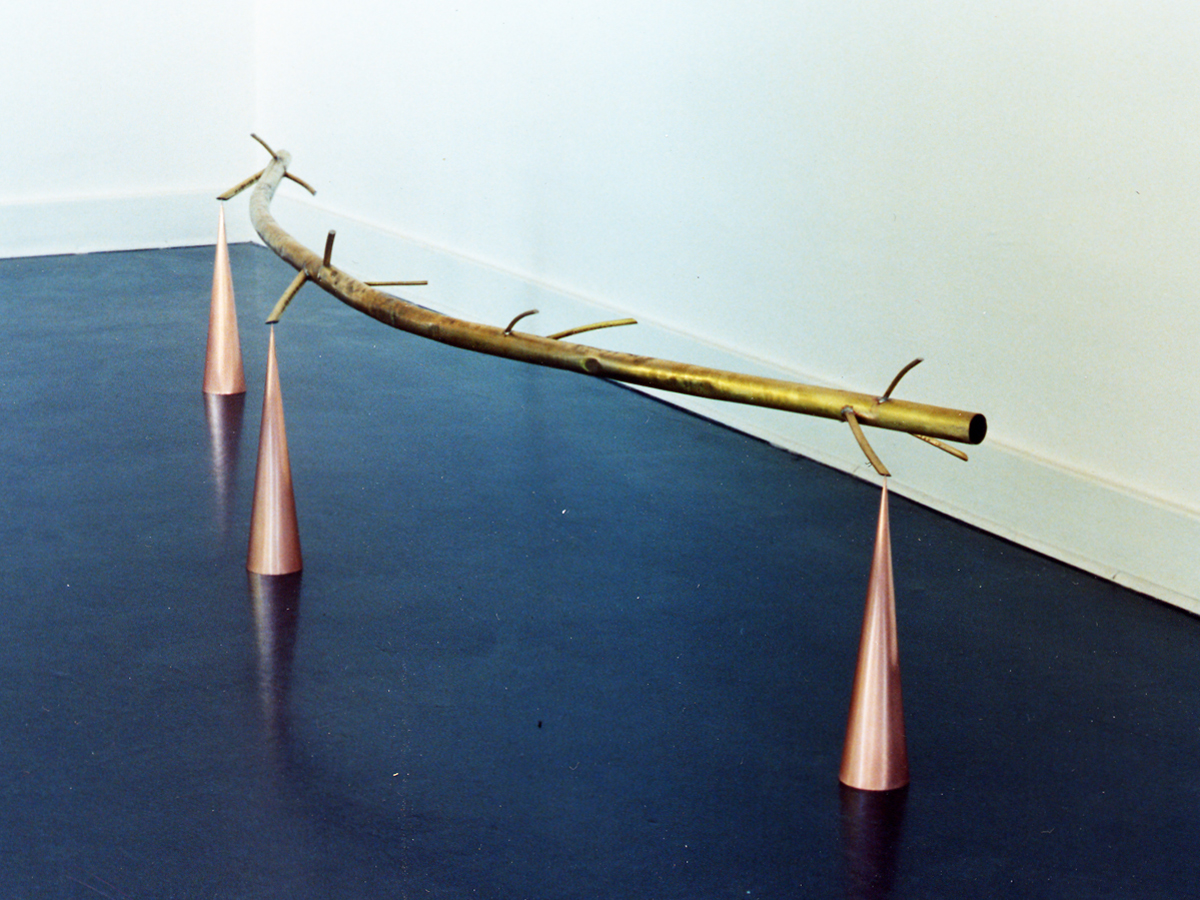
Situation - Floating space, 1989.

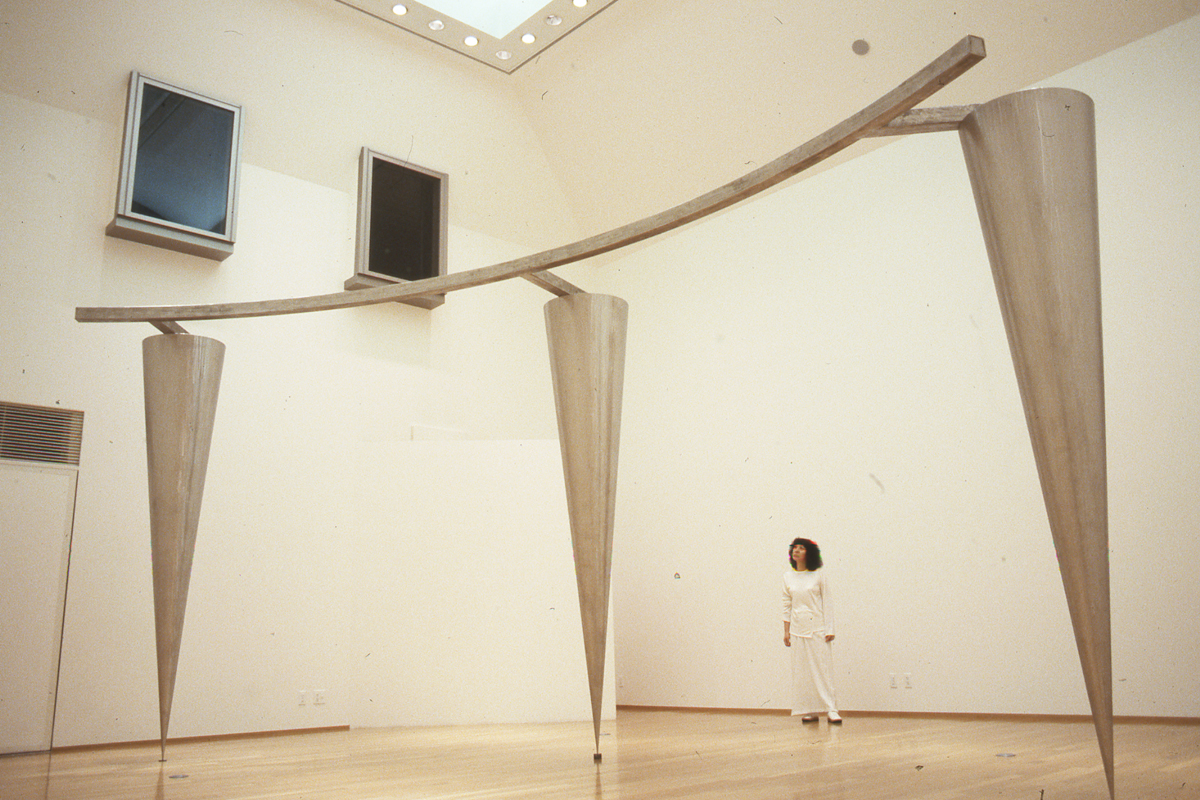
Axis-Longitude-Latitude, 1999.

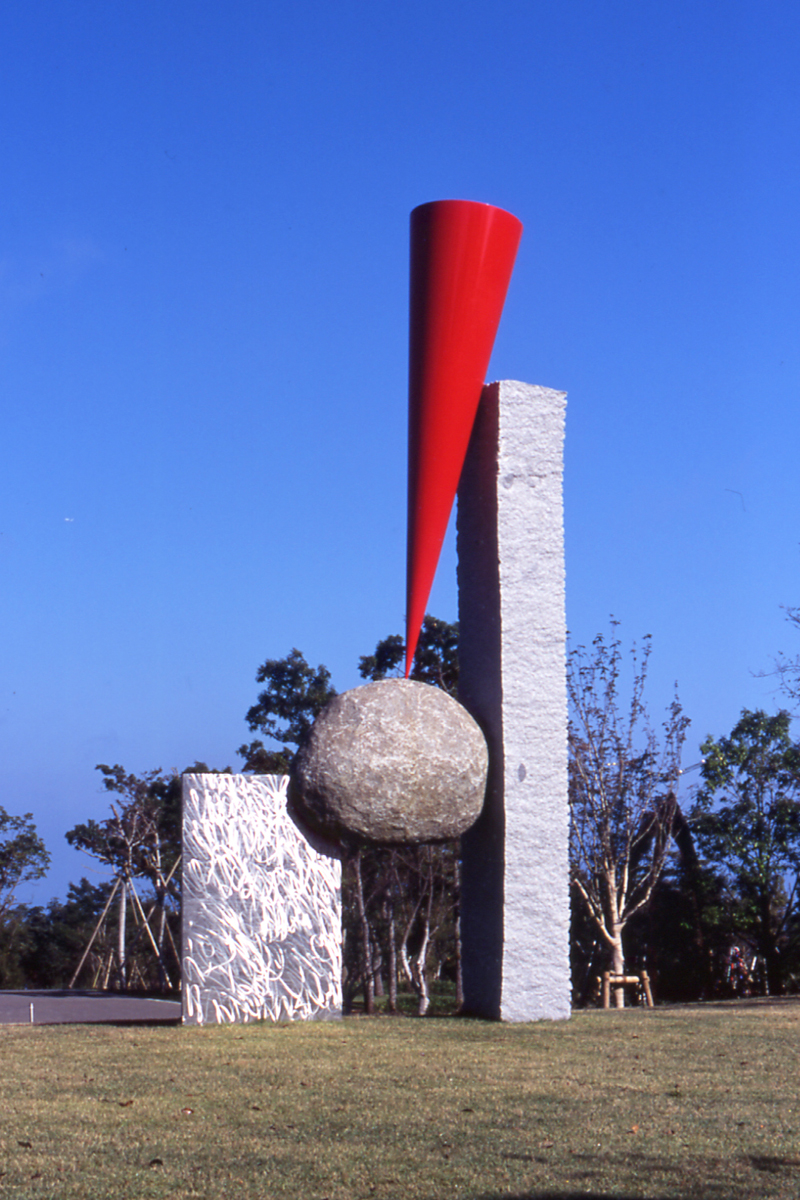
Floating form - Red, 2000.

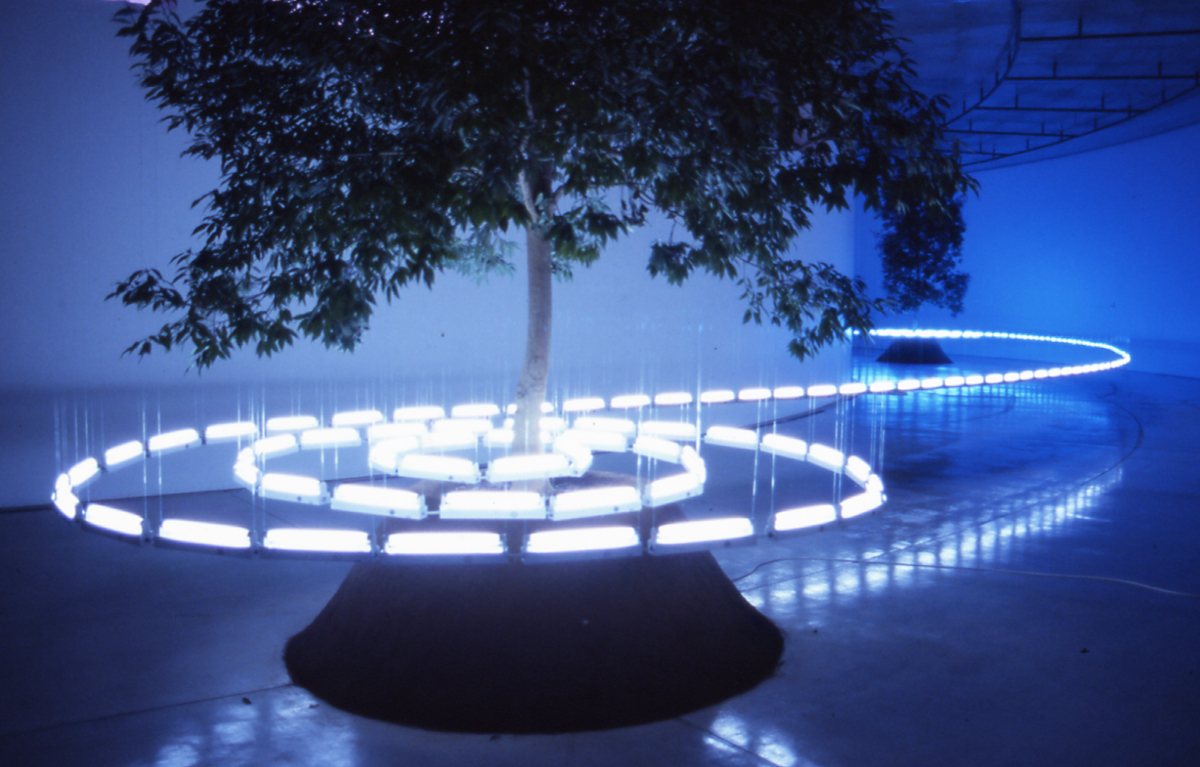
With a tree - Touch of Spiral, 2003.

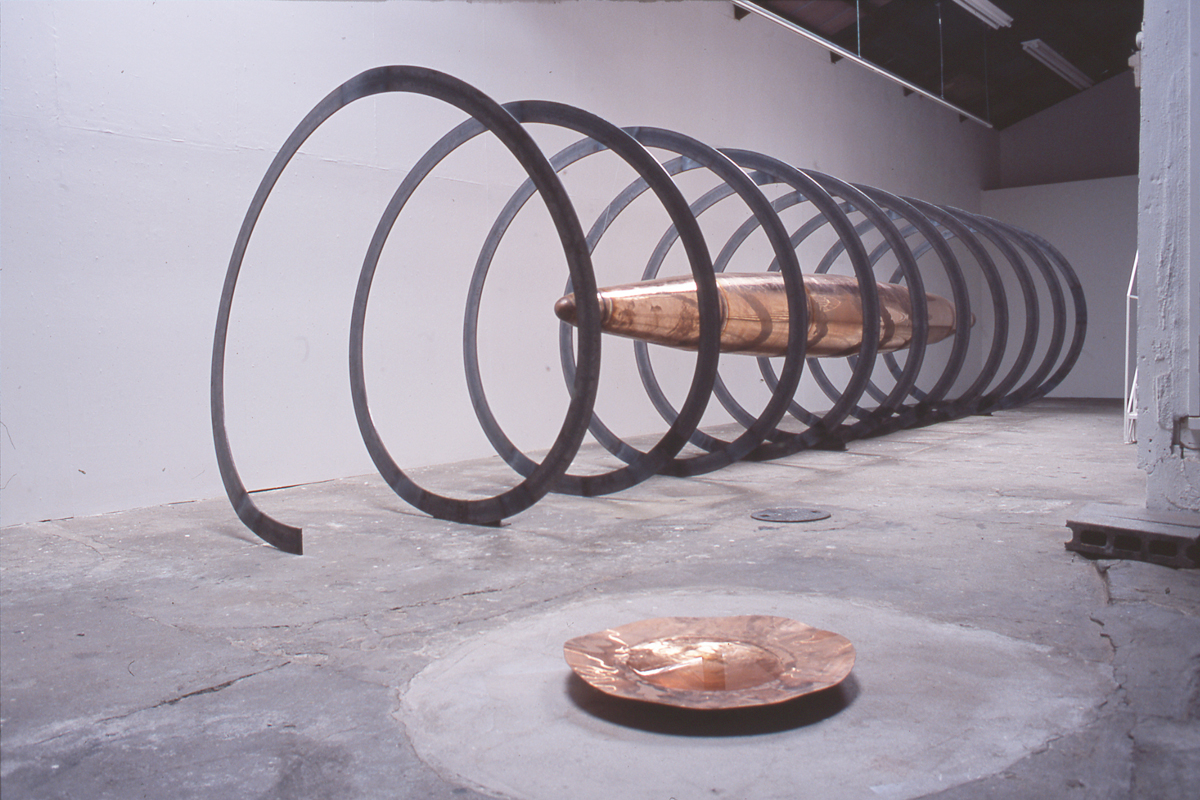
Touch of Spiral, 2007.

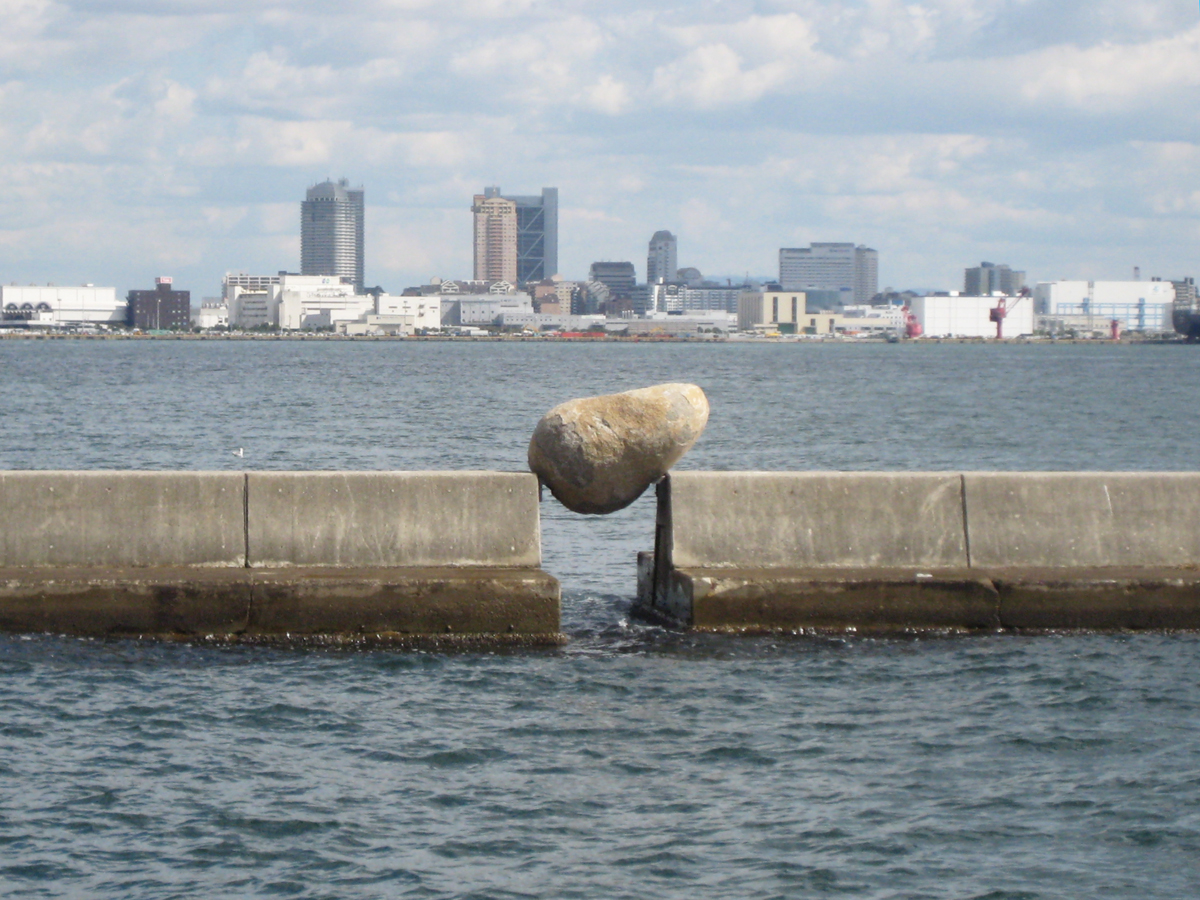
In between - form II, 2009.

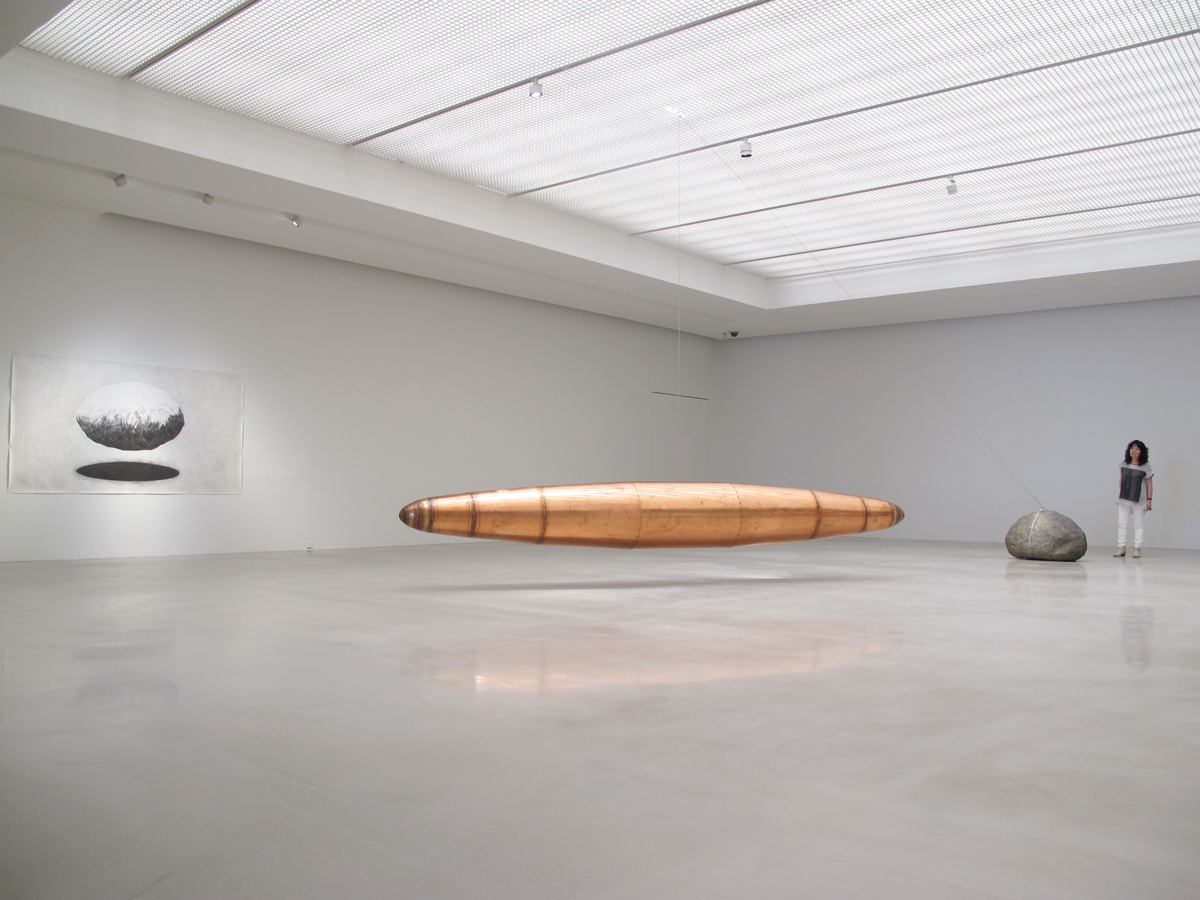
Floating form - Invisible axis, 2015.

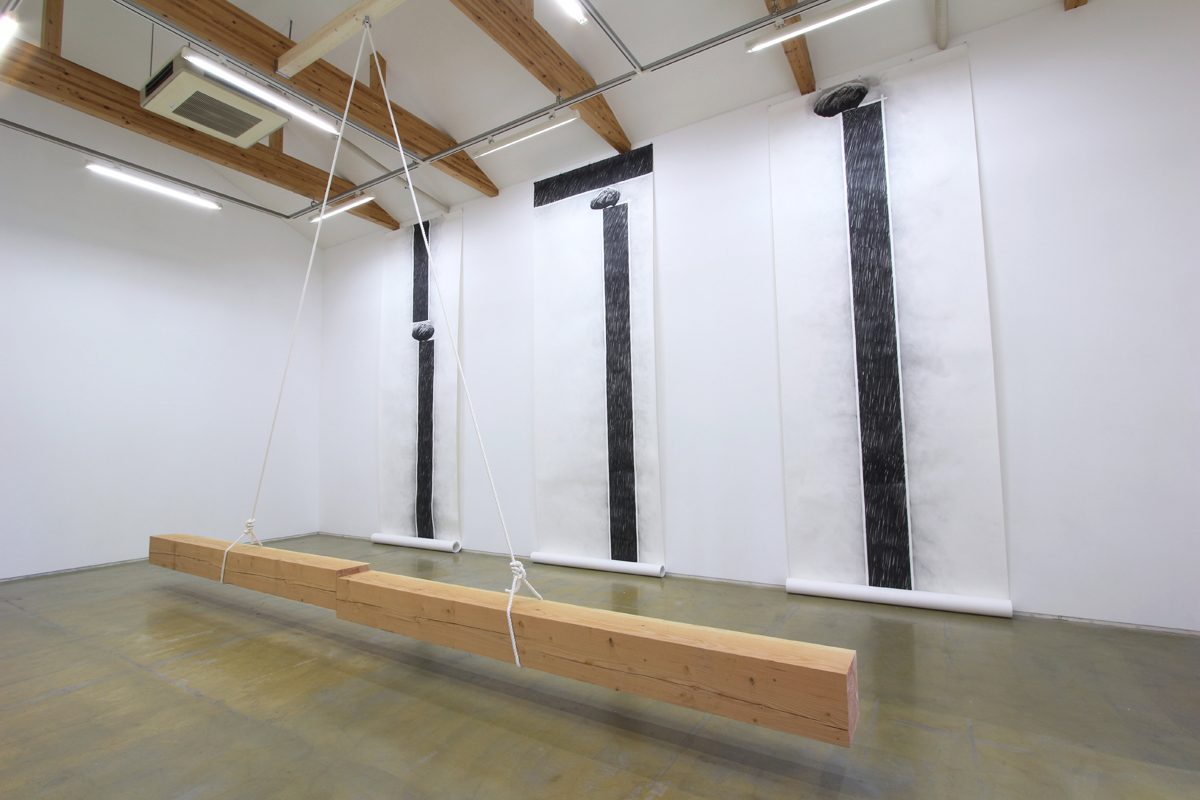
Cutting triangle, 2017.

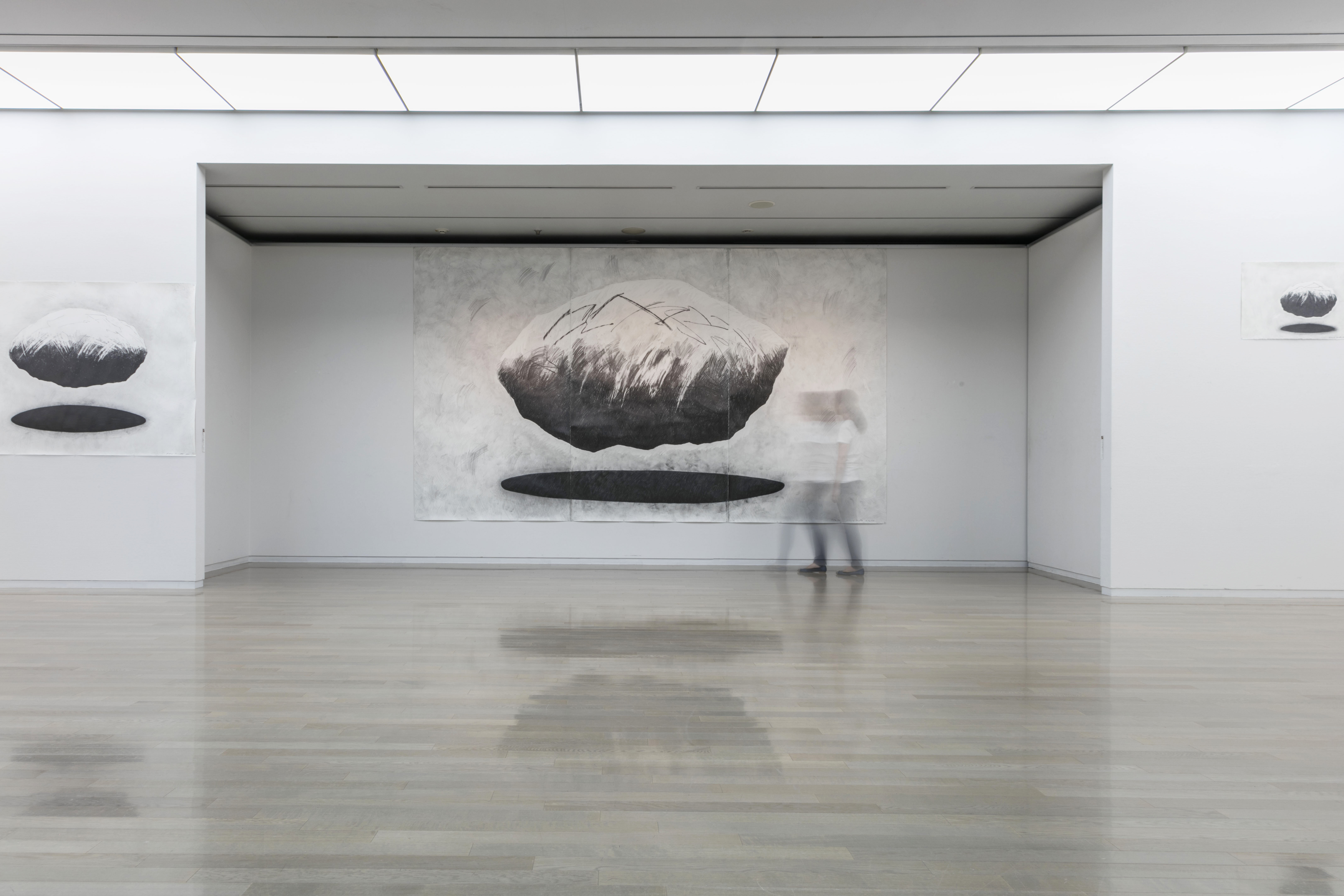
Floating stone, 2017.

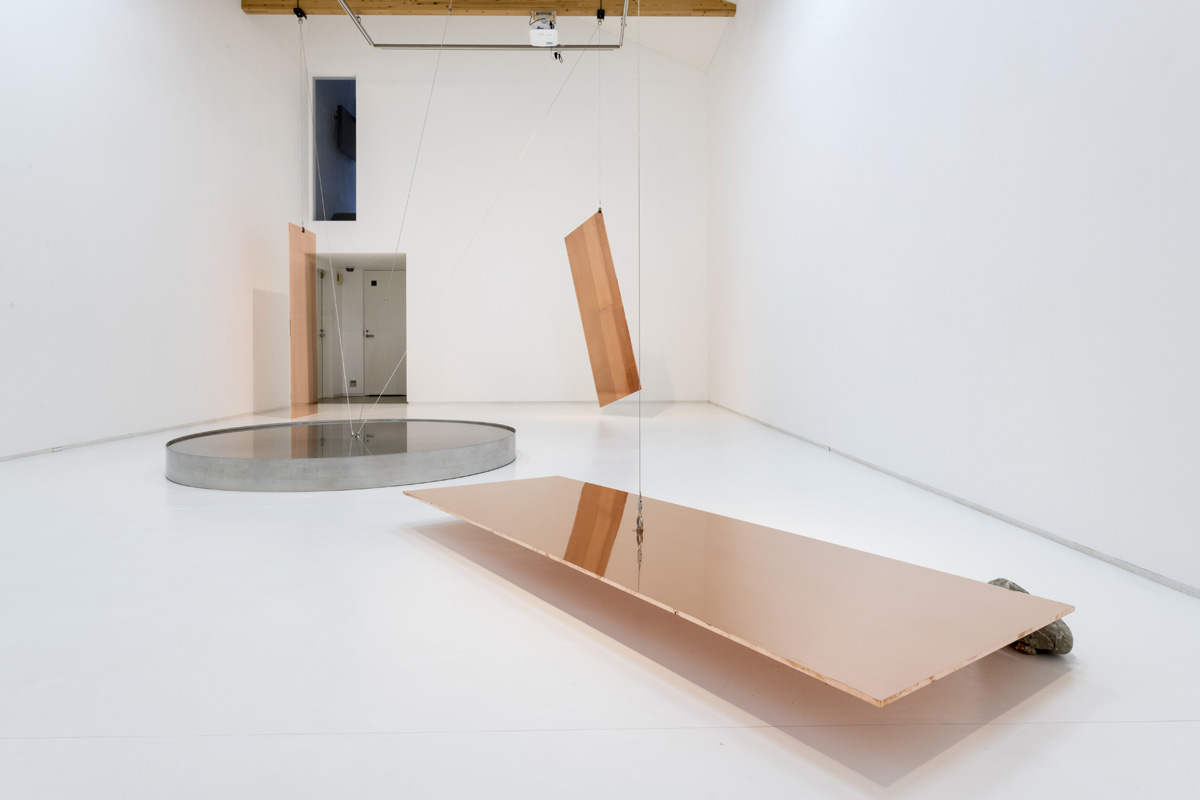
Invisible axis - Horizontal /Vertical inclination, 2019.

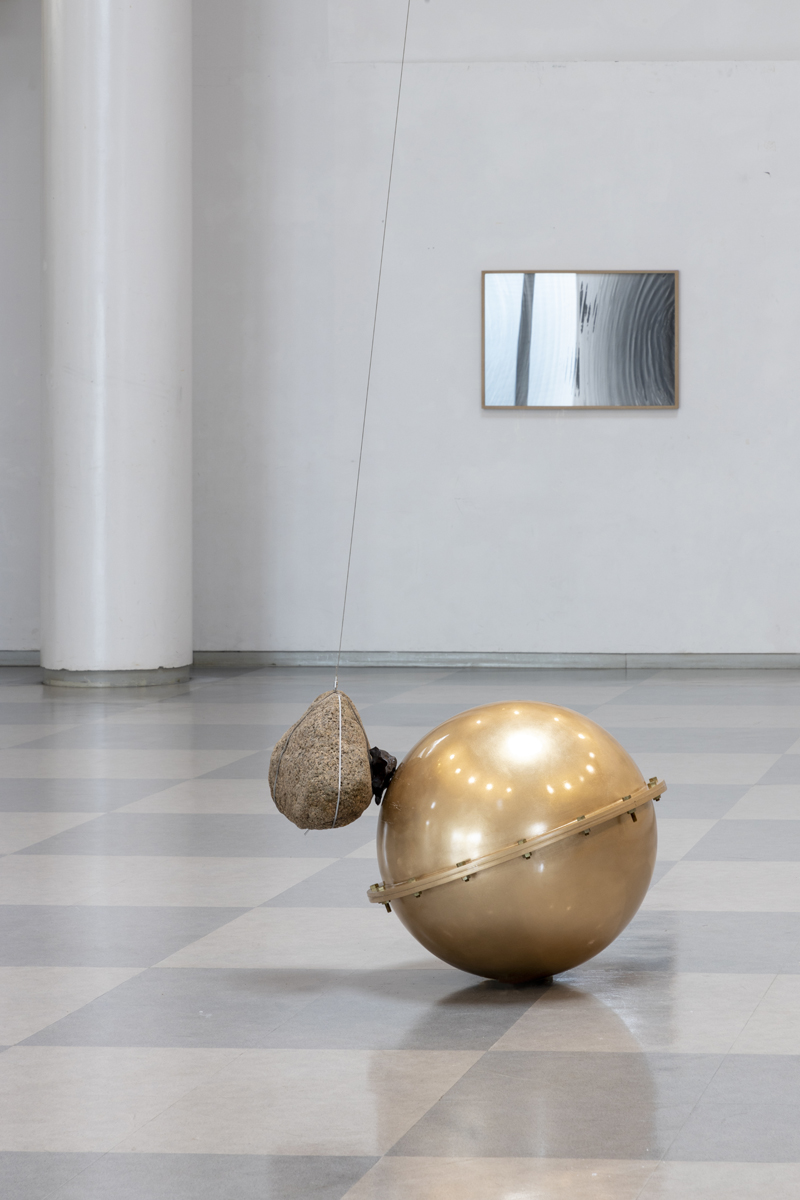
In between friction - Gift from cosmos, 2021.

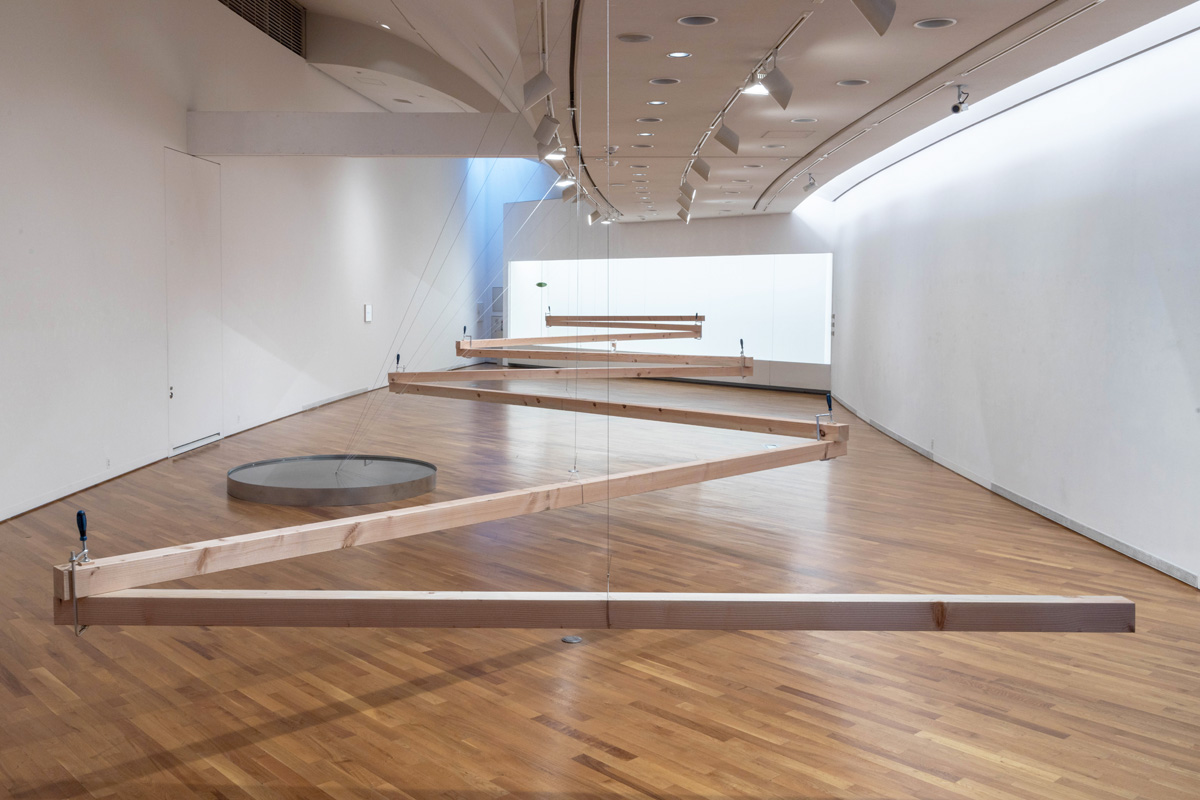
Invisible force - Axis-Longitude-Latitude, 2021.

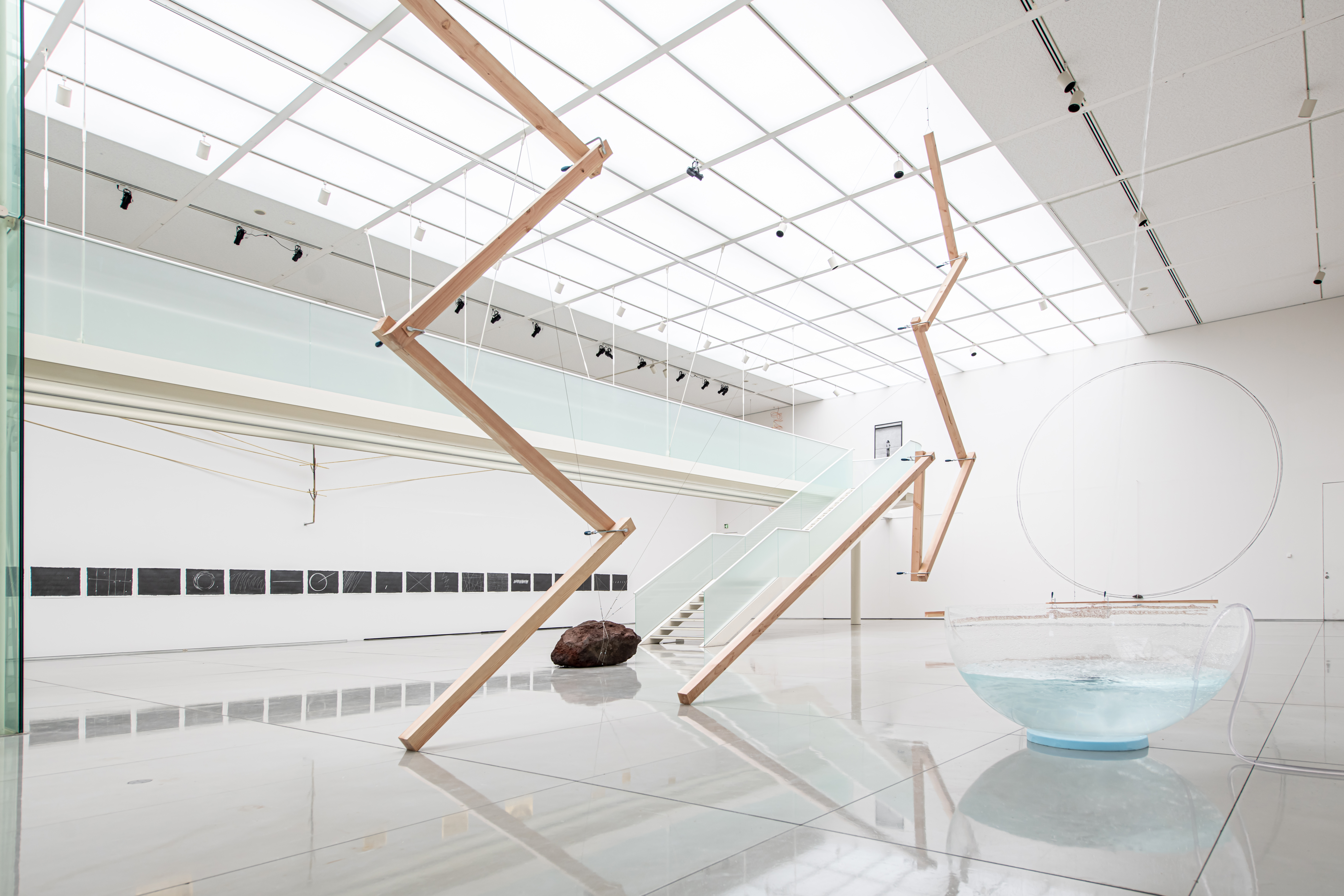
Invisible Force - Between Heaven and Earth, 2022.

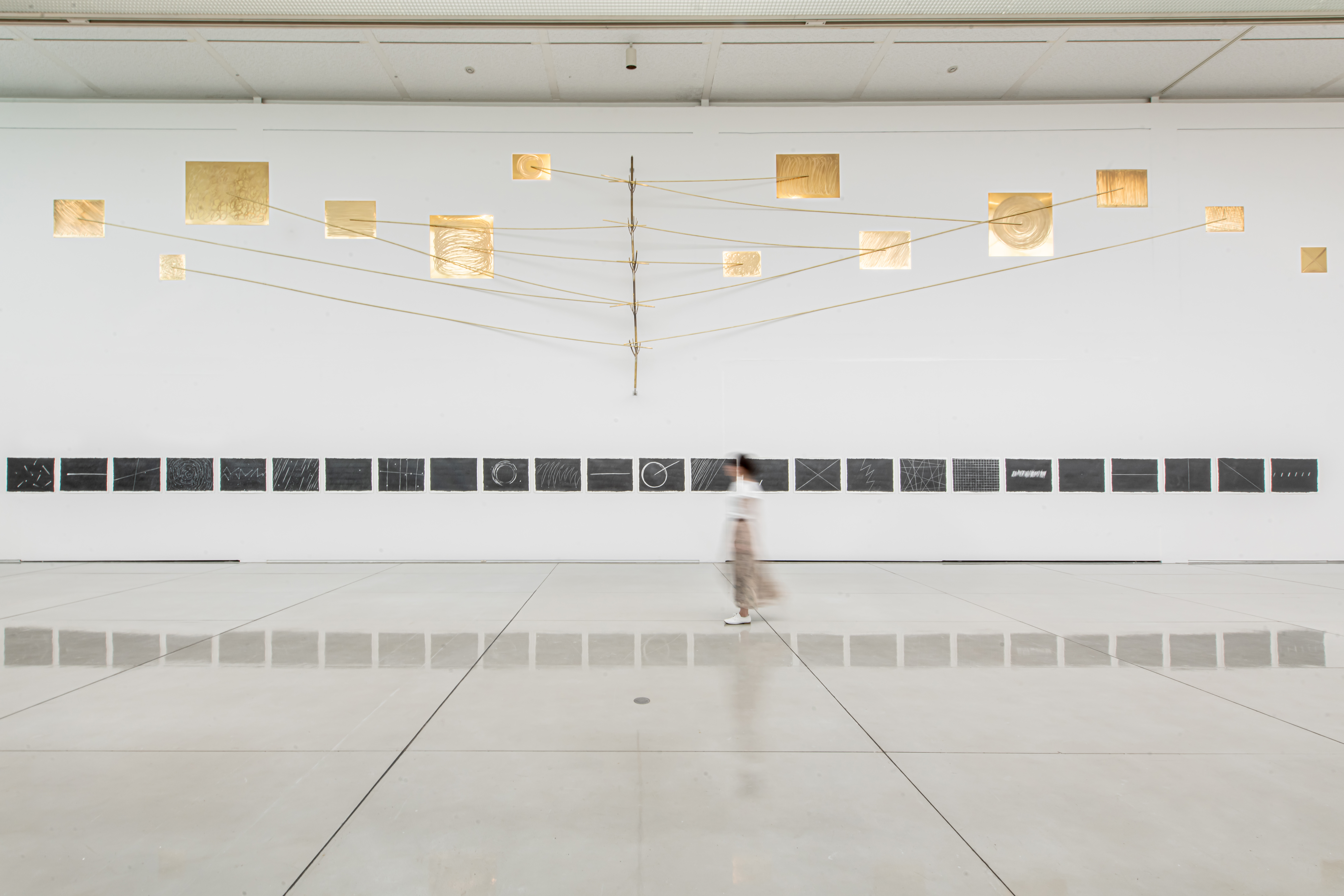
With a Branch - Touching the Energy, 2022.

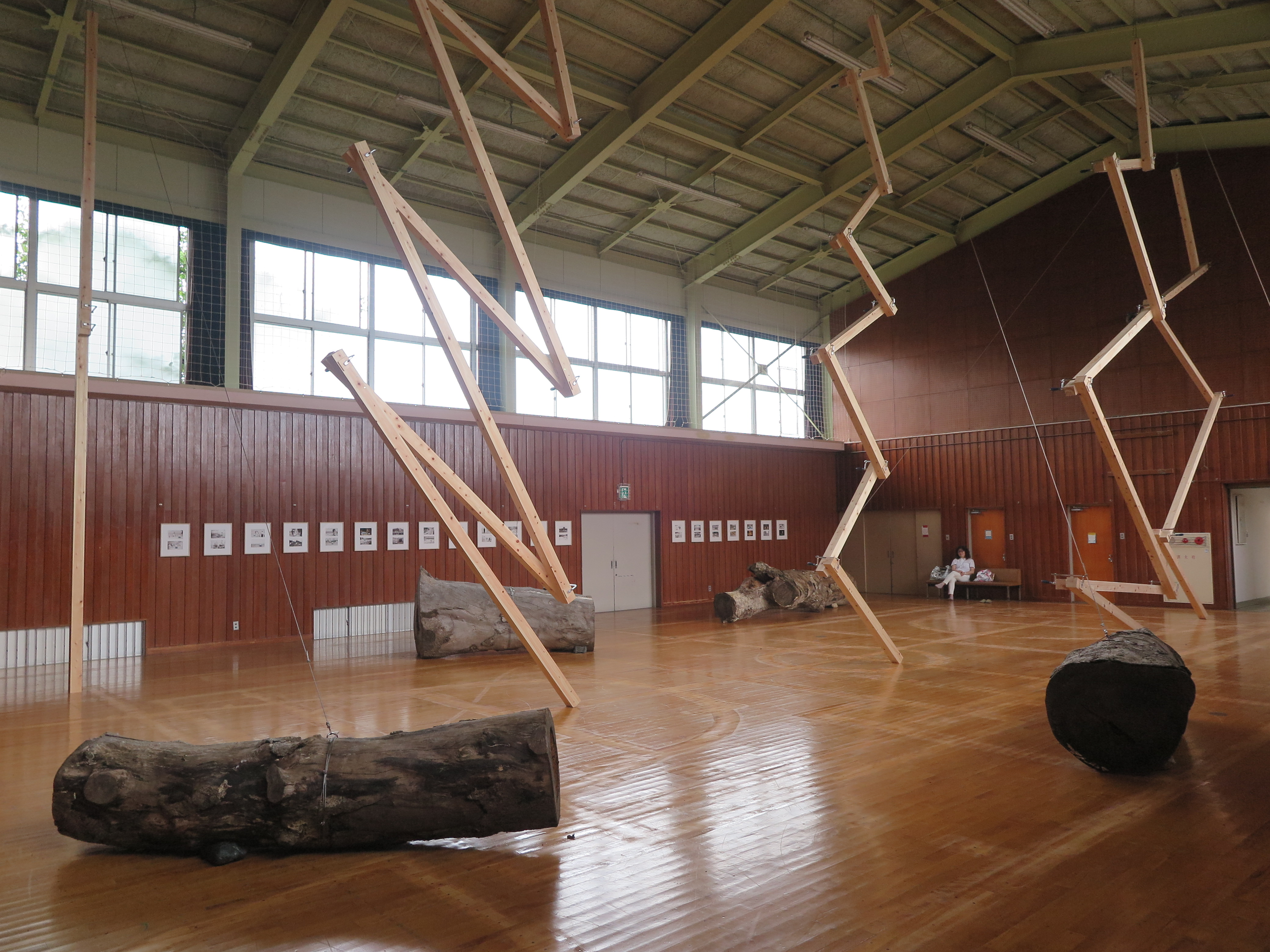
Invisible Energy - Between Heaven and Earth and Sea, 2023.

== Public collections ==
- Wilhelm-Hack-Museum, Germany
- Museum für Kunst und Gewerbe, Hamburg, Germany
- Kunsthalle Bremen, Germany
- Städtische Galerie im Lenbachhaus, Munich, Germany
- Museum Wiesbaden, Hesse, Germany
- Daimler Art Collection, Berlin, Germany
- Cartier Foundation for Contemporary Art, Paris, France
- Musée des Arts Décoratifs, Paris, France
- Musée Reattu, Arles, France
- Maison Elsa Triolet Aragon, St-Arnoult en Yvelines, France
- LA CHAPELLE art contemporain, Clairefontaine, France
- Collection Pinault, France
- Moderna Museet, Stockholm, Sweden
- Museum Voorlinden, Wassenaar, The Netherlands
- Bvlgari Collection, N.Y., USA / Rome, Italy
- Museum of Modern Art, New York City, New York, USA
- The Museum of Fine Arts, Houston, USA
