= Aspen Art Museum =

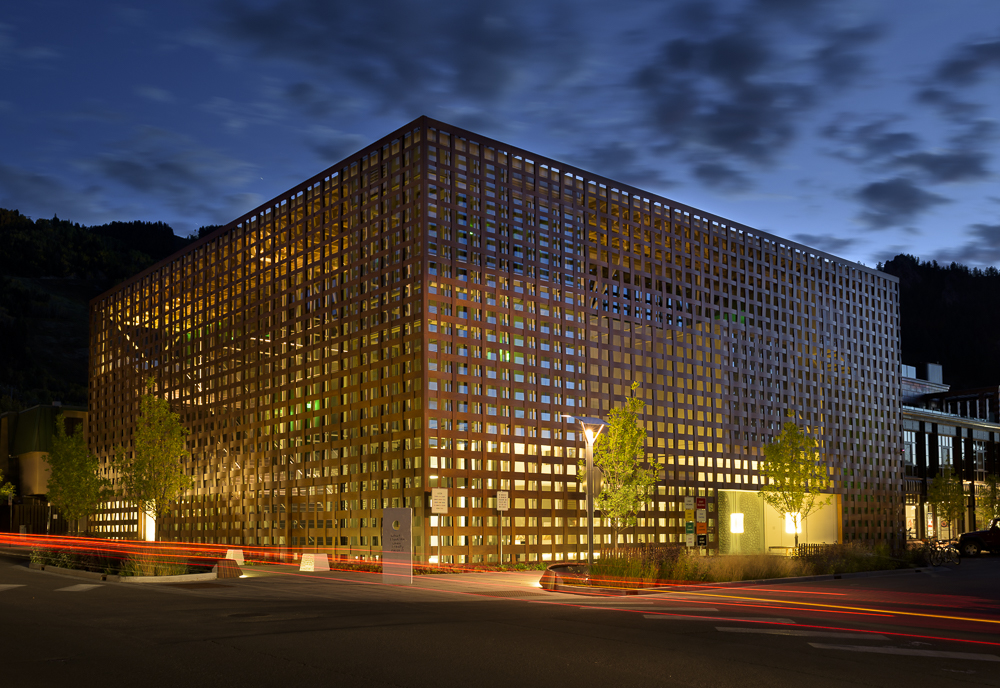
- Aspen Art Museum Building designed by architect Shigeru Ban
- Established: 1979
- Location: 637 E. Hyman Avenue; Aspen, Colorado; United States
- Coordinates: 39°11′37″N 106°49′00″W
- Type: Art museum
- Accreditation: American Alliance of Museums
- Website: www.aspenartmuseum.org

Founded in 1979, the Aspen Art Museum is a non-collecting contemporary art museum located in Aspen, Colorado, United States. Its current Artistic Director and CEO is Nicola Lees who was appointed in 2020.

Aspen Art Museum exhibitions include drawings, paintings, sculptures, multimedia installations and electronic media. The museum offers various learning programs and lectures with artists, curators, and academics.

== Programming ==
=== AIR ===
In 2025, the Aspen Art Museum announced a new, ten-year initiative, inspired by the history of the International Design Conference (IDCA), conceived by Nicola Lees called AIR that launched the following July. The inaugural edition comprised a public festival and a private retreat, both of which took place during Aspen Art Week, and included keynotes, dialogues, performances, and commissions by artists, including, Matthew Barney, Werner Herzog, Paul Chan (artist), Caroline Polachek, and Maya Lin, among many others. In 2026, AIR again featured keynotes, dialogues, performances, commissions, and exhibitions by artists, including Camille Henrot, Morgan Bassichis, Los Thuthanaka, Adrián Villar Rojas, Lyle Ashton Harris, Ivan Cheng, Julie Dash, and Miranda July.

=== Exhibitions ===
As a non-collecting institution, the Museum focuses its resources into commissioning and developing ambitious exhibitions with living artists. In 2021, the artist Precious Okoyomon was invited to transform the Museum's rooftop, installing a mix of indigenous plants with sculptural elements.

== Building ==
Previously housed in a converted hydroelectric plant at 590 North Mill Street, the Aspen Art Museum (AAM) opened its new facility to the public at 637 East Hyman Avenue on August 9, 2014, . The building is designed by architect Shigeru Ban, recipient of the 2014 Pritzker Architecture Prize. It is Ban's first US museum to be constructed. The 33,000-square-foot, four-level facility houses eight exhibition spaces: six gallery spaces, a rooftop sculpture garden, and an outdoor commons. There are five main architectural features within the building's design plan: Grand Stair, Moving Glass Room Elevator, Woven Wood Screen, Wood Roof Truss and Walkable Skylights.

== Accreditation ==
The Aspen Art Museum is accredited by the American Alliance of Museums. The museum is a member institution of the Association of Art Museum Directors (AAMD), which represents directors of art museums throughout the United States, Canada, and Mexico. In March 2009, the AAM joined other Aspen area businesses through becoming certified under a jointly run City of Aspen Environmental Health Department and Canary Initiative “ZGreen” program. Environmental efforts undertaken by the AAM through the ZGreen program include recycling, composting, and zero waste events.

== Residency programs ==
The AAM's Distinguished Artist in Residence Program was first established in 2006. The Aspen Art Museum’s annual artist in residency program brings artists to Aspen, Colorado, to work on creating a new body of work, which will ultimately be exhibited in the AAM galleries. Artists in residence hold a gallery walkthrough and a lecture as part of their residency.
