= Frieze (magazine) =

Contemporary art magazine

frieze
- Cover of issue 247 (November–December 2024)
- Editor: Andrew Durbin
- Categories: Art magazine
- Frequency: 8 issues per year
- Publisher: Ari Emanuel
- Founder: Amanda Sharp; Matthew Slotover; Tom Gidley
- First issue: 1991; 35 years ago
- Company: Frieze Publishing Ltd.
- Country: United Kingdom
- Based in: London, New York, Berlin
- Language: English
- Website: frieze.com/editorial
- ISSN: 0962-0672

Frieze is an international contemporary art magazine, published eight times a year from London.

The publication is part of the London and New York–based media and events company Frieze. Frieze comprises two publications, frieze magazine and Frieze Week, as well as international art fairs in London, Los Angeles, New York and Seoul. Its permanent exhibition space, No.9 Cork Street, is located in Mayfair, London.

Frieze was part of IMG Worldwide, which was owned by Endeavor, before ownership was transferred to MARI.

== History ==
Frieze was founded in 1991 by Amanda Sharp and Matthew Slotover, with artist Tom Gidley. The inaugural issue featured a Damien Hirst butterfly painting as its cover, and the magazine became closely linked with the Young British Artists movement of the 1990s. Sharp and Slotover ceased direct involvement in editorial decisions in 2001. In 2003, the year that the Frieze Art Fair was founded, Sharp and Slotover assumed the roles of Publishing Directors of the magazine, and Directors of the fair.

From April 2011 to fall 2016, Frieze published Frieze d/e—a bilingual German/English quarterly magazine with its own editorial team and independent content. The magazine was edited and produced in Berlin.

In 2016, Endeavor acquired a reported 70%-controlling stake in Frieze, which includes its publishing, art fair and music interests. Simon Fox, formerly CEO of Reach plc, was appointed Frieze's first CEO on 2 April 2020.

In 2019, long-time Frieze editorial director and author, Jennifer Higgie, stepped down from the magazine. Former New York–based senior editor, Andrew Durbin, was then appointed editor in chief.
