= List of British recording studios =

This is a list of notable recording studios in the United Kingdom, arranged in alphabetical order by studio.

== A ==
- AIR Studios - Lyndhurst Hall, London, England
- Abbey Road Studios - St. John's Wood, London, England
- Acer Studios - Greater Manchester, England
- Angel Recording Studios - London, England
- Associated Independent Recording (also known as AIR) - Westminster, London, England
- Astoria Studio - Richmond upon Thames, London, England

== B ==
- Basing Street Studios - London, England
- Blackwing Studios - London, England
- Boatyard Music & Film Studio - Wales
- Brighton Electric - Brighton, England
- Britannia Row Studios - London, England
- British Grove Studios - London, England

== C ==
- Cargo Studios - Greater Manchester, England
- Castle of Doom Studios - Glasgow, Scotland
- CaVa Studios - Glasgow, Scotland
- Chipping Norton Recording Studios - Oxfordshire, England

== E ==
- Eden Studios - London, England
- Eel Pie Studios - London, England

== F ==
- Fairview Studios - Willerby, Hull, England
- The Farm - Chiddingfold, England
- Forbidden London - London, England

== G ==
- Gooseberry Sound Studios - London, England

== H ==
- Headley Grange - East Hampshire, England

== I ==
- IBC Studios - London, England
- Island Studios - London, England

== K ==
- Konk Studios - London, England

== L ==
- Livingston Recording Studios - London, England

== M ==
- The Manor Studio - Oxfordshire, England
- Mayfair Studios - London, England
- Metropolis Group - London, England
- Miloco Studios - London, England
- Monnow Valley Studio - Rockfield, Monmouth, Wales
- Morgan Studios - London, England
- Motor Museum - Liverpool, England

== N ==
- Nemo Studios - London, England

== O ==
- Olympic Studios - London, England

== R ==
- RAK Studios - London, England
- Real World Studios - Box, England
- Ridge Farm Studio - West Sussex, England
- RG Jones Recording Studios - London - Morden, Surrey
- Rockfield Studios - Monmouth, Wales
- Ronnie Lane's Mobile Studio
- Roundhouse Studios - London, England

== S ==
- Sarm Studios - London, England
- Sawmills Studio, Golant - Cornwall, England
- Sound Techniques - London, England
- Strawberry Studios (also known as Inner City Studios) - Stockport, England
- Sphere Studios - London, England / Los Angeles, USA

== T ==
- The Church Studios - London, England
- Toe Rag Studios - Hackney, London, England
- Trident Studios - London, England
- Townhouse Studios - London, England

== W ==
- Wessex Sound Studios - Highbury New Park, London
- The Wool Hall - Beckington, near Bath, Somerset

== See also ==
- List of U.S. recording studios
