= Vivienne Westwood =

British fashion designer (1941–2022)

Dame Vivienne Westwood DBE RDI FRSA
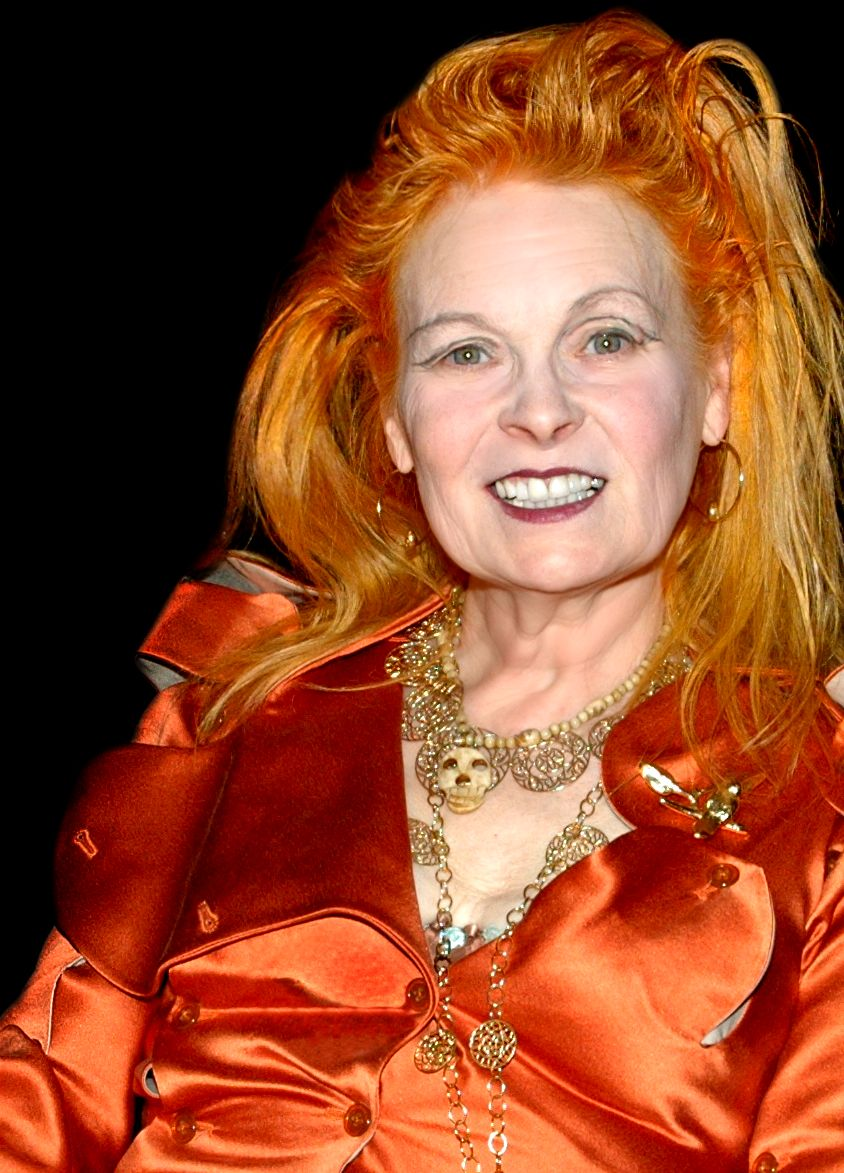
- Westwood in 2008
- Born: Vivienne Isabel Swire; 8 April 1941; Hollingworth, Cheshire, England
- Died: 29 December 2022 (aged 81); Clapham, London, England
- Education: University of Westminster
- Occupations: Primary school teacher; fashion designer; businesswoman; activist
- Label: Vivienne Westwood
- Spouses: Derek Westwood (m. 1962; div. 1965); Malcolm McLaren (m. 1967; div. 1980); Andreas Kronthaler (m. 1993)
- Children: Benjamin Westwood, Joseph Corré
- Awards: British Fashion Designer of the Year (1990, 1991, 2006)

Dame Vivienne Isabel Westwood (née Swire; 8 April 1941 – 29 December 2022) was an English fashion designer and businesswoman, largely responsible for bringing modern punk and new wave fashions into the mainstream. In 2022, Sky Arts ranked her the 4th most influential artist in Britain of the past 50 years.

Westwood came to public notice when she made clothes for the boutique that she and Malcolm McLaren ran on King's Road, which became known as Sex. Their ability to synchronise clothing and music shaped the 1970s UK punk scene, which included the Sex Pistols, a band managed by McLaren. She viewed punk as a way of "seeing if one could put a spoke in the system".

Westwood opened four shops in London and eventually expanded throughout Britain and the world, selling a varied range of merchandise, some of which promoted her political causes such as the Campaign for Nuclear Disarmament, climate change and civil rights groups.

== Life and career ==
=== Early years ===
Westwood was born in Hollingworth, Cheshire, on 8 April 1941. She grew up in nearby Tintwistle, and was the daughter of Gordon Swire and Dora Swire (née Ball), who had married two years previously, two weeks after the outbreak of the Second World War. At the time of Vivienne's birth, her father was employed as a storekeeper in an aircraft factory; he had previously worked as a greengrocer.

In 1958, her family moved to Harrow, Greater London. Westwood took a jewellery and silversmith course at Harrow Art School (now part of the University of Westminster) but left after one term, saying: "I didn't know how a working-class girl like me could possibly make a living in the art world". After taking a job in a factory and studying at Trent Park Teacher Training College, she became a primary-school teacher. During this period, she created her own jewellery, which she sold at a stall on Portobello Road.

In 1962, she met Derek Westwood, an apprentice at the Hoover factory, in Harrow. They married on 21 July 1962; Westwood made her own wedding dress. In 1963, she gave birth to a son, Benjamin.

=== Malcolm McLaren ===
Westwood's marriage to Derek ended after she met Malcolm McLaren. Westwood and McLaren moved to Thurleigh Court in Clapham, where their son Joseph Corré was born in 1967. Westwood continued to teach until 1971 and also created clothes which McLaren designed. McLaren became manager of the punk band the Sex Pistols, and subsequently the two garnered attention as the band wore Westwood's and McLaren's designs.

=== Punk era ===
Westwood was one of the architects of the punk fashion phenomenon of the 1970s, saying "I was messianic about punk, seeing if one could put a spoke in the system in some way". Westwood's emergence as a designer who made garments that reflected the economic, social, and political contexts of 1970s Britain coincided with a disillusioned youth, who developed a unique style of dress and musical expression which was instantly identifiable through its aesthetic and sound.

Westwood's boutique, originally managed with McLaren, was a meeting place for early members of the London punk scene. The boutique regularly changed names and interior design through the 1970s to fit with collections and design inspirations. It remains in its original location at 430 Kings Road, Chelsea, London (under the name Worlds End since 1980, following a short period of closure in the 1980s) to this day.

McLaren and Westwood were keen entrepreneurs, and their designs sold in their boutique – named Let It Rock, Too Fast To Live Too Young To Die, Sex, and subsequently Seditionaries – helped to define and market the punk look at the exact moment that it exploded in popularity on the streets of London. Westwood's designs during the Punk Era and thereafter were informed by historicism; the V&A describing Westwood as "a meticulous researcher". Westwood began challenging gender norms and promoting experimentation in her designs, which at the outset were created in collaboration with McLaren.

Initially, Westwood created garments referencing the dress of the 1950s Teddy Boys, which were worn by McLaren. Upon opening Let It Rock in 1971, the first incarnation of Westwood and McLaren's boutique, early creations for the shop incorporated such influences reminiscent of the youth subculture fashions of the 1950s. Inspired by the rebellious nature of the 1950s youth, Let It Rock referenced the clothing, music, and décor of the immediate postwar era.

In 1972, Let It Rock was refashioned into Too Fast To Live Too Young To Die, in homage to the death of James Dean. Though design references for garments retailed under Too Fast To Live Too Young To Die focussed on the rocker aesthetic of the 1960s, the boutique still sold Teddy Boy inspired garments under the Let It Rock label. The new politically leaning design inspirations for Too Fast To Live Too Young To Die were conveyed through Westwood's sleeveless T-shirts, bearing various statements such as 'PERV' and 'ROCK', created using a combination of safety pins, chicken bones, and glitter glue.

Two years later, in 1974, Westwood and McLaren's boutique was re-modelled, and reopened as Sex. Pieces sold in Sex were intentionally abrasive and challenging, with designs grounded in fetish and sado-masochism, seeking to provoke a comfortable middle class and inspire young punks into political action by challenging the status quo. Garments retailed at Sex included skirts and dresses made from rubber as well as t-shirts with pornographic material printed on them. The clothes often had large intentional rips in them and sizeable zippers incorporated into the garments.

Sex became a meeting point at the centre of the punk scene, and transformed into Seditionaries in 1976. Clothing retailed at Seditionaries (Seditionaries: Clothes for Heroes) retained the familiar references of Sex, including historicism, the challenging of gender norms, and fetish. However, Seditionaries pieces were made from different cloths and fibres. The development of Westwood signatures – bondage trousers covered with straps to restrict, 'unravelling' loose-knit jumpers made of mohair, and long-sleeved tops fashioned from soft muslins, which featured graphic screen printed designs and fastenings to the sleeves to give the effect of a straight-jacket – during this period quickly became archetypal punk staples.

Westwood also inspired the style of punk icons, such as Viv Albertine, who wrote in her memoir, "Vivienne and Malcolm use clothes to shock, irritate and provoke a reaction but also to inspire change. Mohair jumpers, knitted on big needles, so loosely that you can see all the way through them, T-shirts slashed and written on by hand, seams and labels on the outside, showing the construction of the piece; these attitudes are reflected in the music we make. It's OK to not be perfect, to show the workings of your life and your mind in your songs and your clothes."

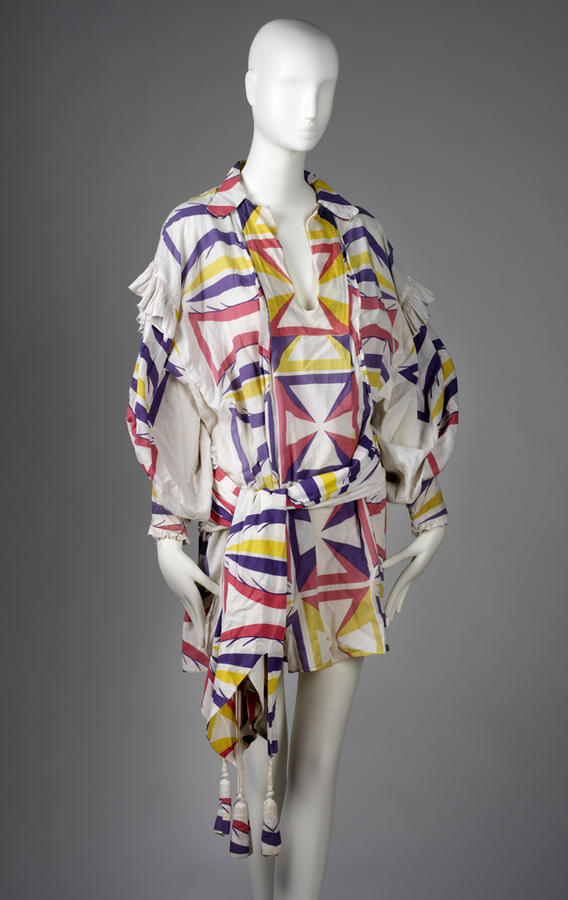
Vivienne Westwood and Malcolm McLaren hand screen-printed cotton dress and sash, Pirate collection, 1981. Museum of Art Rhode Island ,Design, tl 2008-2.

Westwood was disenchanted with the direction that adoptees had taken punk in, many of them uninterested in punk's political values, viewing the style of the movement as a marketing opportunity instead of a medium for radical change; with the dissolution of the Sex Pistols, Westwood's inspiration for her eponymous line shifted instead to the 18th century. She was particularly influenced by Pirates and the Incroyables and merveilleuses, a radical movement amongst nobles who had survived the French Revolution which referenced the guillotine to which many had lost family members.

=== Fashion collections ===
Westwood's designs were independent and represented a statement of her own values. She collaborated on occasion with Gary Ness, who assisted Westwood with inspirations and titles for her collections.

McLaren and Westwood's first fashion collection to be shown to the media and potential international buyers was Pirate, combining 18th and 19th century dress, British history and textiles with African prints. This was the first time in which Westwood explored her inspiration of historic sources in current day couture, the Pirate runway had featured both rap and an array of ethnic music. Subsequently, their partnership, which was underlined by the fact that both their names appeared on all labelling, produced collections in Paris and London with the thematic titles Savages (shown late 1981), Buffalo/Nostalgia Of Mud (shown spring 1982), Punkature (shown late 1982), Witches (shown early 1983) and Worlds End 1984 (later renamed Hypnos, shown late 1983). After the partnership with McLaren was dissolved, Westwood showed one more collection under the Worlds End label: Clint Eastwood (late 1984–early 1985).

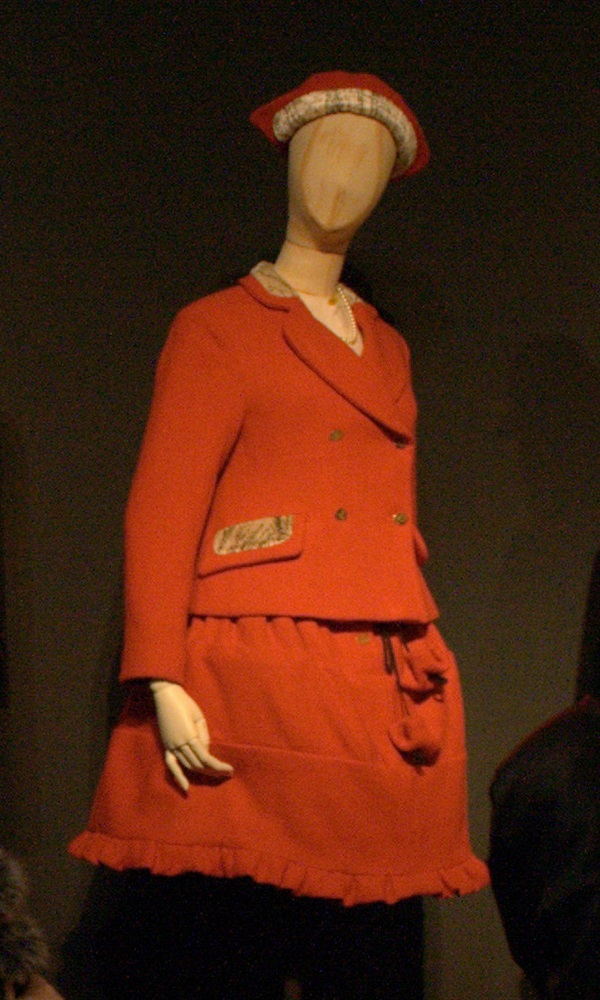
The 'Mini-Crini,' 1985–87

She dubbed the period 1981–85 "New Romantic" (during which time she created the famous look of the band Adam and the Ants) and 1988–91 as "The Pagan Years" during which "Vivienne's heroes changed from punks and ragamuffins to Tatler girls wearing clothes that parodied the upper class". From 1985 to 1987, Westwood took inspiration from the ballet Petrushka to design the mini-crini, an abbreviated version of the Victorian crinoline. Its mini-length, bouffant silhouette inspired the puffball skirts widely presented by more established designers such as Christian Lacroix. The mini-crini was described in 1989 as a combination of two conflicting ideals – the crinoline, representing a "mythology of restriction and encumbrance in woman's dress", and the miniskirt, representing an "equally dubious mythology of liberation". Westwood continued her research in fashion history by studying garments found in museum collections, which are evident through her incorporations of neck ruffs, corsets, bustles, breeches, and paniers in her various collections. Works from the artists Jean-Antione Watteau, Anthony van Dyck, and François Boucher have been used as inspiration for several pieces of Westwood's garments including scarves, corsets, and leggings.

For Autumn-Winter 1987/88, Westwood showcased the 'Harris Tweed' collection which launched her long-standing relationship with the Scottish cloth, Harris tweed, and the Harris Tweed Authority. The collection is often credited as being instrumental in reviving its use as a fashion fabric, thereby boosting the local industry. In the collection, she had also adopted the use of the Orb logo, an orb resembling the sovereign's orb with a satellite ring around it like the rings of Saturn. This sparked controversy as it was similar to the Orb trade mark of the Harris Tweed Authority (then the Harris Tweed Association).

Following her death, the Harris Tweed Authority released the following statement:

In the late 1980's Vivienne Westwood commenced use of a logo which, we consider, acknowledged her connections with and affection for our cherished cloth. Whilst that may not have been well received by everyone in the Harris Tweed® industry, subsequently both brands have very successfully collaborated to their mutual benefit. We hope and expect that collaboration will continue for many years to come.

In 2007, Westwood was approached by the Chair of King's College London, Patricia Rawlings, to design an academic gown for the college after it had successfully petitioned the Privy Council for the right to award degrees. In 2008, the Westwood-designed academic dresses for King's College were unveiled. On the gowns, Westwood commented: "Through my reworking of the traditional robe I tried to link the past, the present and the future. We are what we know."

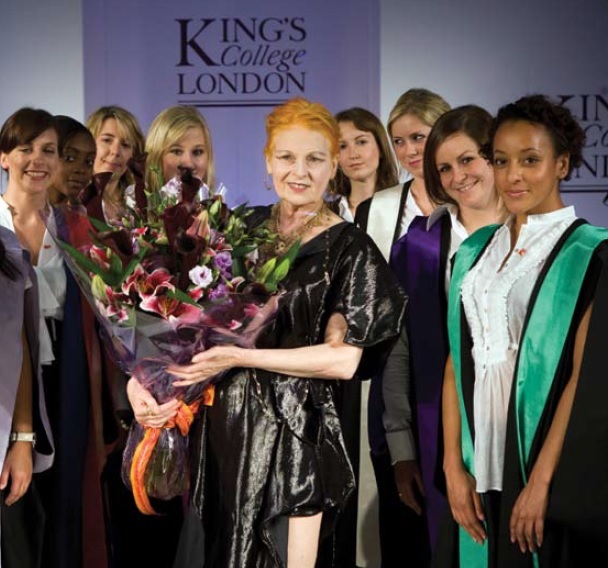
Academic dress of King's College London in different colours, designed and presented by Westwood in 2008

In July 2011, Westwood's collections were presented at The Brandery fashion show in Barcelona.

Westwood worked closely with Richard Branson to design uniforms for the Virgin Atlantic crew. The uniform for the female crew consisted of a red suit, which accentuated the women's curves and hips, and had strategically placed darts around the bust area. The men's uniform consisted of a grey and burgundy three-piece suit with details on the lapels and pockets. Westwood and Branson were both passionate about using sustainable materials throughout their designs to reduce the impact on the environment and so used recycled polyester.

== Vivienne Westwood companies ==
In March 2012, Vivienne Westwood Group reached agreement to end a long-standing UK franchise relationship with Manchester-based Hervia, which operated seven stores for the fashion chain. The deal brought to a conclusion a legal dispute, which included Hervia issuing High Court proceedings for alleged breach of contract, after Westwood sought to end the franchise deal before the agreed term. The subsequent transition of some of the Hervia stores to Westwood, along with cost-savings, was credited for a jump in Vivienne Westwood Ltd's pre-tax profits by nearly a factor of 10, to £5 million from £527,683 the previous year.

The next year, the company announced: "Over the last year margins have been under pressure due to the nature of wider retail conditions."

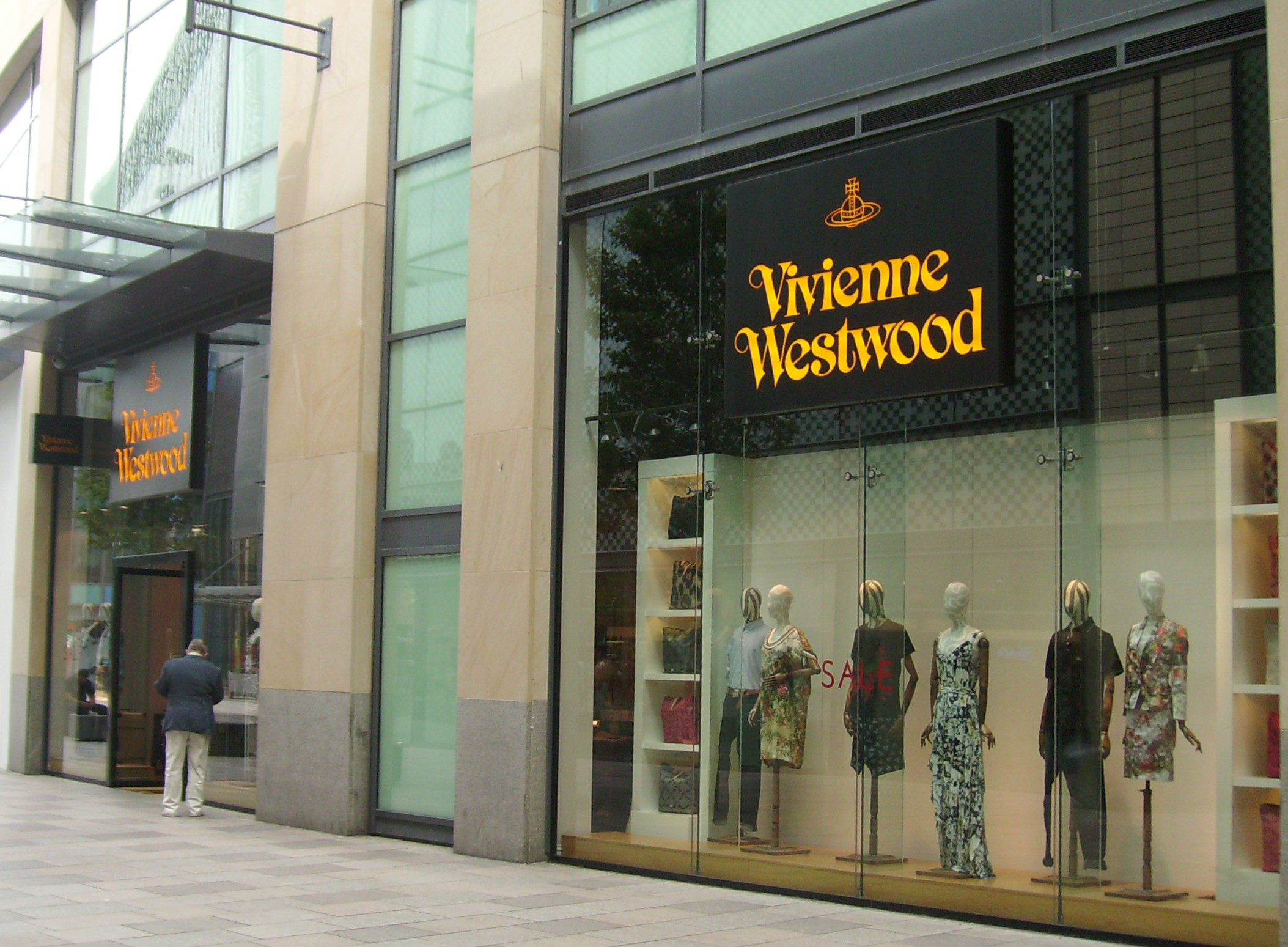
Vivienne Westwood store in Cardiff in 2014

Shortly after, Westwood announced she would cease further expansion of her business as a way of tackling environmental and sustainability issues.

In March 2015, the company announced that it would open a three-story outpost in midtown Manhattan in New York City. This was followed by a new 3,200-square-foot (300 m^{2}) shop in a building also housing the company's offices and showrooms in Rue Saint-Honoré in Paris, opening in early 2016.

As of December 2015, Vivienne Westwood Ltd operated 12 retail stores in the UK, including an outlet store in Bicester Village. There were 63 Westwood shops worldwide including nine in China, nine in Hong Kong, 18 in South Korea, six in Taiwan, two in Thailand, and two in the United States.

In 2025, the Vivienne Westwood website lists 102 store locations in 17 countries.

=== Tax fine and perception ===
In August 2011, Westwood's company Vivienne Westwood Ltd agreed to pay £350,000 in tax plus interest of £144,112, due in 2009, to HM Revenue and Customs (HMRC) for underestimating the value of her brand. Her UK business had sold the rights to her trademarks to Luxembourg-based Latimo, which she controlled, for £840,000 in 2002. After examining the deal, HMRC argued that the brand had been undervalued. The £2 million valuation triggered additional taxes.

Accounts for Vivienne Westwood Ltd showed that since 2011, the company had continued to pay £2 million a year to offshore company Latimo for the right to use Westwood's name on her own fashion label. Latimo, which Westwood controlled as the majority shareholder in her companies, was set up in 2002. Such arrangements, while legal, were against the Green Party policy to eliminate use of tax havens such as Luxembourg. In March 2015, Westwood said, "It is important to me that my business affairs are in line with my personal values. I am subject to UK tax on all of my income". Later in 2015, she said that she had restructured her corporate tax arrangements to try to align them with the Green Party's policy.

=== Criticism by Eluxe Magazine over sustainability of Westwood clothing ===
In 2013, sustainable luxury fashion publication Eluxe Magazine accused Westwood of using the green movement as a marketing tool because some of Westwood's fashion and accessories lines are made in the People's Republic of China. These were found to include PVC, polyester, rayon and viscose, all derived from harmful chemicals. Eluxe wrote that, despite Westwood's statements that consumers should 'buy less', her company produces nine collections a year compared to the average designer's two. Eluxe accused Westwood of using unpaid interns in her fashion house and making them work over 40 hours per week and wrote that some interns complained about their treatment by the fashion house.

== Notable clients and commissions ==
In 1993, Westwood designed many of the colorful suits and outfits Duran Duran wore during their tour for The Wedding Album, as well as those that appeared in the three videos for that album: "Ordinary World", "Come Undone" and "Too Much Information".

Dita Von Teese wore a purple Westwood gown for her formal wedding ceremony when she married Marilyn Manson in 2005.

Marion Cotillard wore a Westwood red satin strapless dress at the London premiere of her film Public Enemies in 2009. In 2013, she wore a Westwood Couture pink and ivory striped dress at the Chopard lunch in Cannes.

In 2011, Princess Eugenie wore three Westwood designs for the pre-wedding dinner, the wedding ceremony and the after-wedding party at the wedding of Prince William and Catherine Middleton.

Pharrell Williams wore a Westwood Buffalo hat that was originally in Westwood's 1982–83 collection to the 2014 56th Annual Grammy Awards. The hat was so popular that it inspired its own Twitter account. Williams was first seen wearing a similar Westwood Buffalo hat in 2009.

Dua Lipa wore custom Westwood on the red carpet of the 2021 Brit Awards.

In Final Fantasy XV, Lunafreya Nox Fleuret's wedding dress was designed by Westwood.

=== Sex and the City ===
Westwood's designs were featured in the 2008 film adaptation of the television series Sex and the City. In the film, Carrie Bradshaw becomes engaged to long-term lover Mr. Big. Being a writer at Vogue, she is invited by her editor to model wedding dresses, including a design made by Westwood. The dress is subsequently sent to Carrie as a gift, with a handwritten note from Westwood herself ("Dear Carrie, I saw your photo from the Vogue shoot. This dress belongs to you! Love, Vivienne Westwood"), and Carrie decides to use the Westwood gown. The wedding dress has also been described as one of the movie's most iconic features, leading Westwood to approach the producers about being involved in making a sequel. A version of the dress was subsequently made available for purchase on Net-a-porter, and sold out in a matter of hours. It was available as a knee-length version.

== Political involvement ==
In April 1989, Westwood appeared on the cover of Tatler dressed as Prime Minister Margaret Thatcher. The suit that Westwood wore had been ordered for Thatcher but not yet delivered. The cover, which bore the caption "This woman was once a punk", was included in The Guardian list of the best ever UK magazine covers.

In September 2005, Westwood joined forces with the British civil rights group Liberty and launched exclusive limited design T-shirts and baby wear bearing the slogan I AM NOT A TERRORIST, please don't arrest me. She said she was supporting the campaign and defending habeas corpus. "When I was a schoolgirl, my history teacher, Mr. Scott, began to take classes in civic affairs. The first thing he explained to us was the fundamental rule of law embodied in habeas corpus. He spoke with pride of civilisation and democracy. The hatred of arbitrary arrest by the lettres de cachet of the French monarchy caused the storming of the Bastille. We can only take democracy for granted if we insist on our liberty", she said. The sale of the £50 T-shirts raised funds for the organisation. Westwood stated on television in 2007 that she had transferred her long-standing support for the Labour Party to the Conservatives, due to concerns about civil liberties and human rights.

On Easter Sunday 2008, she campaigned in person at the biggest Campaign for Nuclear Disarmament demonstration in ten years, at the Atomic Weapons Establishment, Aldermaston, Berkshire.

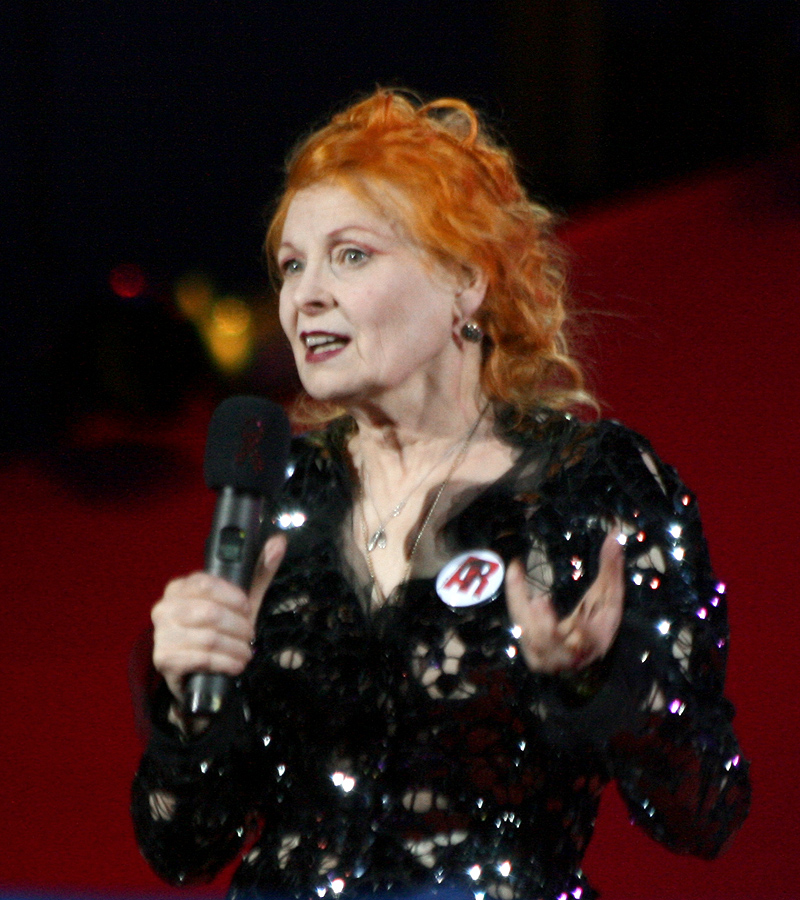
Westwood at the Life Ball in Vienna in 2011

The next year, she cut off her hair to highlight the dangers of climate change. She also appeared in a PETA ad campaign to promote World Water Day and vegetarianism, drawing attention to the meat industry's water consumption.

In 2014, Westwood bought a controlling interest in the equity crowdfunding platform Trillion Fund, which was dissolved in 2019.

In January 2015, Westwood stated her support of the Green Party: "I am investing in the Green Party because I believe it is in the best interests of our country and our economy". It was reported that she had donated £300,000 to fund the party's election campaign. In February 2015, Westwood was announced as the special guest on the Greens' We Are The Revolution campaigning tour of English universities in such cities as Liverpool, Norwich, Brighton and Sheffield. On the eve of the tour, Westwood was excluded from appearing by the youth wing of the Green Party due to her avoidance of UK corporate tax, which contravened party policy on usage of off-shore tax havens. She later condemned this as "a wasted opportunity" for the Greens. "I wasn't pure enough for them", she wrote in her online diary. Subsequently, Westwood switched her support to campaigning on behalf of Nigel Askew, the 'We are the Reality Party' candidate opposing UKIP leader Nigel Farage in the Kent constituency of Thanet South. Askew polled 126 votes in the election.

In June 2017, Westwood endorsed Labour leader Jeremy Corbyn for the 2017 general election. She said, "I'm excited about the Labour Party manifesto because it's all about the fair distribution of wealth." She added "Jeremy clearly wants to go green and creating a fair distribution of wealth is the place to start, from there we can build a green economy which will secure our future." In November 2019, along with other public figures, Westwood signed a letter supporting Corbyn that described him as "a beacon of hope in the struggle against emergent far-right nationalism, xenophobia and racism in much of the democratic world" and endorsed him in the 2019 UK general election.

=== Active Resistance manifesto ===
In a 2007 interview, Westwood spoke out against what she perceived as the "drug of consumerism". She said: "I don't feel comfortable defending my clothes. But if you've got the money to afford them, then buy something from me. Just don't buy too much" in response to claims that anti-consumerism and fashion contradict each other.

Later, Westwood created a manifesto called Active Resistance to Propaganda, which she said deals with the pursuit of art in relation to the human predicament and climate change. She claimed that her manifesto "penetrates to the root of the human predicament and offers the underlying solution. We have the choice to become more cultivated and therefore more human – or by muddling along as usual we shall remain the destructive and self-destroying animal, the victim of our own cleverness." The manifesto was read by Westwood at a number of venues including the London Transport Museum and distributed after readings as a booklet. It was then written in the form of a play and staged at the Bloomsbury Ballroom by Forbidden London and Dave West on 4 December 2009. It starred Michelle Ryan and a number of other British actors.

Westwood's manifesto was criticized by eco-activists who claimed that despite her calls to save the environment, she herself made no concessions to making her clothing or her business eco-friendly.

=== Julian Assange and WikiLeaks ===
Westwood was a longtime supporter of Julian Assange and WikiLeaks, and called for his release from custody. In June 2013, Westwood dedicated one of her collections to Chelsea Manning and at her fashion show she and all her models wore large image badges of Manning with the word "Truth" under her picture. In 2012, she used her appearances at London Fashion Week to push for Assange's release by presenting "I am Julian Assange" t-shirts. She visited him several times during his political asylum at the Ecuadorian Embassy in London and in Belmarsh Prison after his arrest in April 2019. In July 2020, she protested outside London's Old Bailey court against Assange's possible extradition to the United States by wearing a yellow pantsuit and suspending herself in a giant birdcage. Describing herself as the canary in the coal mine, she said she was "half-poisoned already from government corruption of law and gaming of the legal system by government".

For Assange's wedding to Stella Moris in March 2022 in Belmarsh Prison, the groom wore an outfit based on a Scottish kilt and the bride a dress with a graffiti application, both designs by Westwood and her husband, Austrian fashion designer Andreas Kronthaler.

== Books ==
Westwood was also a noted author or co-author of books, such as Fashion in Art: The Second Empire and Impressionism, in which she explored the worlds of fashion and the arts and the links between them.

Vivienne Westwood Opus 2008 limited edition was published for London Fashion Week 2008, documents Westwood's work and is also a unique work of art. The book measures 35.4 by 25.2 inches (90 cm × 64 cm), weighs 44 pounds (20 kg), with a total limited edition of 900. There are 9 different covers and titles each numbered 1 to 100: manifesto, cockroach propaganda, pirate squiggle, propaganda eyes, I am expensive, AR-Vivienne Westwood, innocent, active resistance to propaganda and union jack. The Opus contains 97 large-format Polaroid photographs, each measuring 19.7 by 23.6 inches (50 cm × 60 cm). The subjects include Westwood, her friends and models, including Naomi Campbell, Kate Moss, Jerry Hall, Georgia May Jagger, the Sarah, Duchess of York, Tim Burton, Bob Geldof, Jasmine Guinness, and Helena Bonham Carter.

== Legacy and recognition ==
In the 1992 Birthday Honours, Westwood was appointed an Officer of the Order of the British Empire (OBE) for services to fashion design. She received her medal from Queen Elizabeth II at Buckingham Palace; at the ceremony, Westwood wore nothing but sheer tights with a reinforced bikini top under her skirt, which was later captured by a photographer in the courtyard of the Palace. Westwood later said, "I wished to show off my outfit by twirling the skirt. It did not occur to me that, as the photographers were practically on their knees, the result would be more glamorous than I expected," and added: "I have heard that the picture amused the Queen." Westwood advanced from OBE to Dame Commander of the same Order (DBE) in the 2006 New Year Honours "for services to British fashion", and earned the award for British Designer of the Year on three occasions.

She was a Fellow of the Royal Society of Arts (FRSA).

Westwood was awarded a Fellowship at King's College London in 2007, and in 2008 she designed 20 new academic gowns and hoods for King's students to wear at their graduation ceremonies. In 2008, Heriot-Watt University awarded Westwood an honorary degree of Doctor of Letters for her contribution to the industry and use of Scottish textiles.

In January 2011, Westwood was featured in a Canadian-made television documentary called Vivienne Westwood's London in which she takes the viewer through her favourite parts of London, including the Courtauld Institute of Art, the Wallace Collection, Whitechapel (accompanied by Sara Stockbridge), Hampton Court, the London Symphony Orchestra, Brixton Market and Electric Avenue, and the National Gallery.

In 2012, Westwood was among the British cultural icons selected by artist Sir Peter Blake to appear in a new version of his most famous artwork – the Beatles' Sgt. Pepper's Lonely Hearts Club Band album cover – to celebrate the British cultural figures of his life that he most admires. Also in 2012, Westwood was chosen as one of The New Elizabethans to mark the Diamond Jubilee of Queen Elizabeth II. A panel of seven academics, journalists and historians named Westwood among a group of 60 people in the UK "whose actions during the reign of Elizabeth II have had a significant impact on lives in these islands and given the age its character". A tartan outfit designed by Westwood featured on a commemorative UK postage stamp issued by the Royal Mail in 2012, celebrating Great British Fashion.

In October 2014, the authorised biography Vivienne Westwood by Ian Kelly was published by Picador. Paul Gorman described it as "sloppy" and "riddled with inaccuracies" on the basis of multiple errors in the book including misspelling the names of popular rock stars "Jimmy" Hendrix and Pete "Townsend" and misidentifying the date of the Sex Pistols' first concert and McLaren's age when he died. Regarding Gorman's claims, Picador publisher Paul Baggaley told The Bookseller: "We always take very seriously any errors that are brought to our attention and, where appropriate, correct them." A spokesman for Macmillan Publishers, which published an Australian edition of the biography, confirmed that the matter was being handled by the publisher's lawyers.

In 2016, the Metropolitan Museum of Art in New York, acquired a Tits t-shirt, designed by McLaren and sold at Seditionaries between 1976 and 1980.

In 2018, a documentary film about Westwood, called Westwood: Punk, Icon, Activist, premiered. The next year, Isabel Sanches Vegara wrote and Laura Callaghan illustrated Vivienne Westwood, one of the series, Little People, Big Dreams, published by Frances Lincoln Publishing.

In 2022, the documentary Art Lovers Unite! starring Vivienne Westwood, directed by Patrick J. Thomas and Dacob, had its world premiere at the Melbourne Documentary Film Festival in Australia.

From 28 March – 6 September 2026, the Bowes Museum exhibited Vivienne Westwood: Rebel – Storyteller – Visionary, featuring her designs from the 1980s to 2000s.

== Personal life ==
Westwood had two children. Ben Westwood (born 1963) is her son with first husband Derek Westwood; he is a photographer of erotica. Her second son, Joseph Corré (born 1967) with second husband Malcolm McLaren, is the founder of lingerie brand Agent Provocateur. Cora Corré, activist and model, is her granddaughter.

Westwood married her former fashion student, Andreas Kronthaler, in 1992.

For 30 years, Westwood lived in an ex-council flat on Nightingale Lane, Clapham. In 2000, Kronthaler convinced her to move into a Queen Anne style house in Clapham built in 1703. She was a keen gardener and a vegetarian. She identified spiritually as a Taoist.

=== 80th birthday ===
To celebrate her 80th birthday, Westwood was commissioned by CIRCA, an art platform founded in 2020 by British-Irish artist Josef O'Connor, to present a new video work on the Piccadilly Lights screen in Piccadilly Circus, London. In the ten-minute film created with her brother, the punk icon performed a rewritten rendition of "Without You" from My Fair Lady to offer a stark warning of societal indifference to the looming environmental catastrophes, a call against the arms trade, and its link to climate change: "I have a plan 2 save the World. Capitalism is a war economy + war is the biggest polluter, therefore Stop War + change economy 2 fair distribution of wealth at the same time: NO MANS LAND. Let's be clear, U + I can't stop war just like that. But we can stop arms production + that would halt climate change cc + financial Crash. Long term this will stop war". In an interview with The Guardian, her husband Andreas Kronthaler was quoted as saying, "It was a beautiful day because for once she let herself enjoy it."

=== Death ===
Westwood died in Clapham, London, on 29 December 2022, aged 81.

Former Sex Pistols bass guitarist Glen Matlock paid tribute to Westwood on Twitter, stating that it was "a privilege to have rubbed shoulders with her in the mid '70s at the birth of punk and the waves it created that still resound today for the disaffected." Chrissie Hynde, singer and guitarist of The Pretenders, who had previously been employed as a shop assistant by Westwood and McLaren at Sex during the 1970s, tweeted: "Vivienne is gone and the world is already a less interesting place." Others who paid tribute to Westwood on social media included singer Simon Le Bon from Duran Duran, Boy George, comedian Russell Brand, former Frankie Goes to Hollywood singer Holly Johnson, pop band Bananarama, singer and multimedia artist Yoko Ono, singer Paul McCartney, and the fashion house Alexander McQueen.

Former co-leader of the Green Party MP Caroline Lucas said of Westwood: "Such a legend, a huge inspiration, brilliantly creative and always a committed activist for people and planet – my thoughts are with her family and friends – RIP."

In January 2023 a private funeral was held at Christ Church in Tintwistle, Derbyshire, the village where Westwood grew up, where the church was decorated with 45 metres (148 ft) of MacLeod Harris Tweed tartan, worth around £45,000. A memorial service for Westwood was held, at Southwark Cathedral in London, on 16 February 2023.

== Portraits of Vivienne Westwood ==
The National Portrait Gallery holds 18 images of Westwood taken between 1990 and 2014, including those by Mario Testino, Jane Bown, Juergen Teller, Anne-Katrin Purkiss, and Martin Parr.

== Portrayals ==
Vivienne Westwood was portrayed by Talulah Riley in the 2022 miniseries Pistol.
