= CIRCA (art platform) =

Video screen in Piccadilly Circus, London

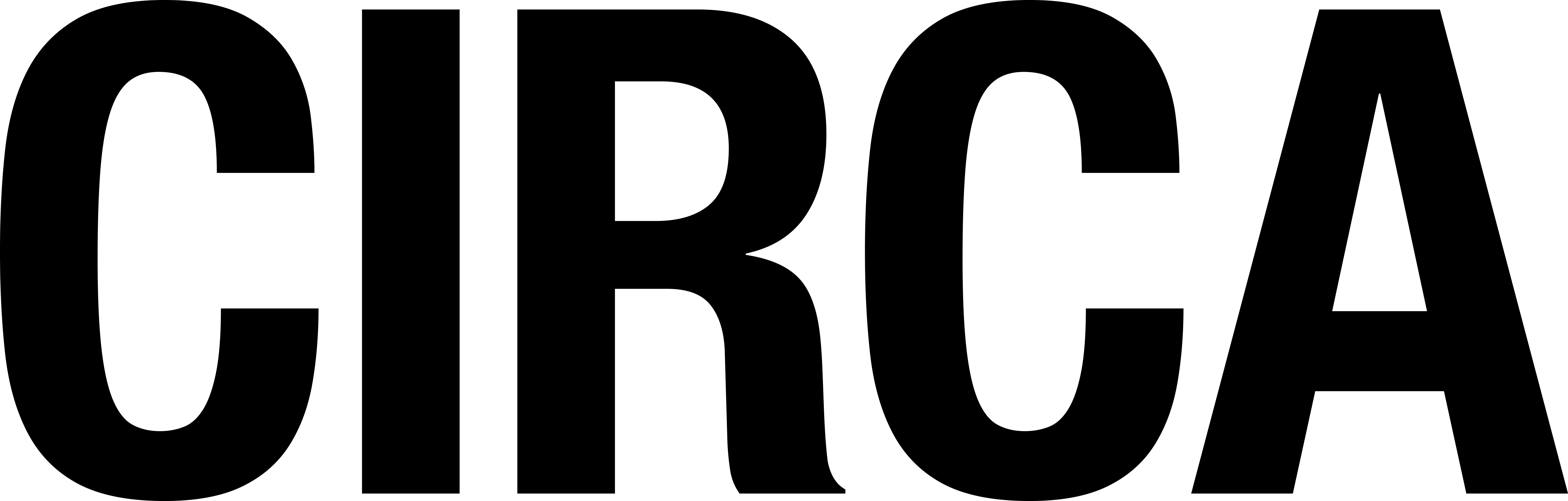
- Founded: October 2020
- Headquarters: Piccadilly Circus, London
- Area served: Worldwide (London, New York, Seoul, Tokyo, Berlin, Milan, Los Angeles, Melbourne)
- Founder: Josef O'Connor
- Industry: Art & Culture
- Website: circa.art

CIRCA is a cultural platform that combines art and technology to present digital art in public spaces. It produces daily broadcasts on the Piccadilly Lights in London. CIRCA commissions artists to create works that interrupt commercial advertising, aiming to encourage public reflection and dialogue. Revenue from the sale of artist editions is used to support a range of initiatives, including public art projects, scholarships, grants, and the annual CIRCA PRIZE.

== History ==
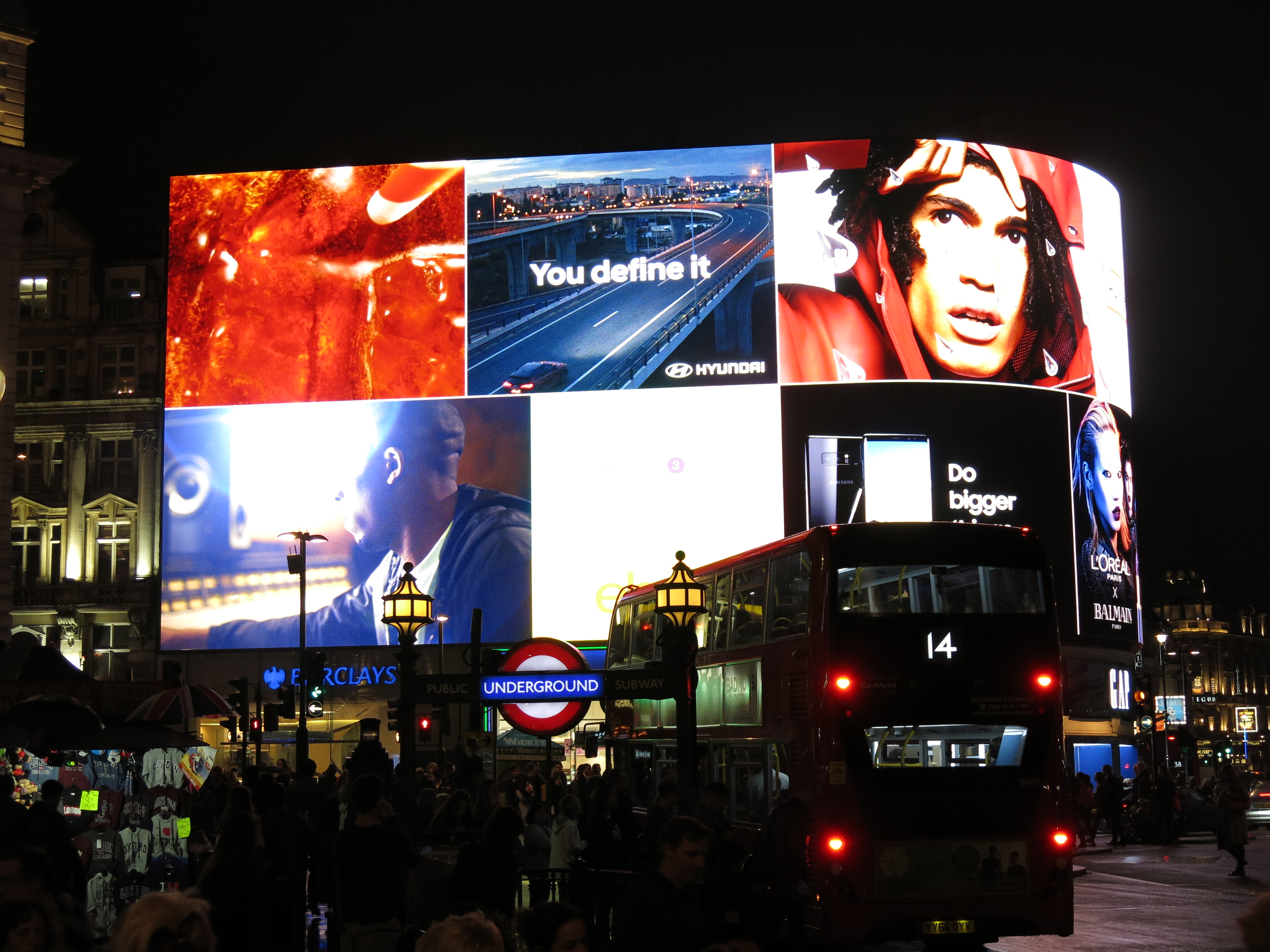
The 4K display billboards at Piccadilly Circus

CIRCA was established in 2020 by British-Irish artist Josef O'Connor. It has a free public art program which is presented in partnership with Europe's largest screen, Piccadilly Lights, and distributed across a global network of billboard screens in Tokyo and Seoul. The daily public art program pauses the advertisements across a global network of screens for three minutes every evening. They commission new work to fill the space that considers the world in response to the present year: circa 2020, 2021, etc. It is said to be the largest digital art exhibition in Europe.

The first artist to fill the three-minute daily slot was Ai Weiwei, who is quoted as saying in an interview with The Art Newspaper that "CIRCA 20:20 offers a very important platform for artists to exercise their practice and to reach out to a greater public”. Other notable artists and curators whose works have been exhibited as part of the CIRCA programs include Yoko Ono, Marina Abramović, Cauleen Smith, Eddie Peake, Patti Smith, James Barnor,Vivienne Westwood David Hockney, Alvaro Barrington and Anne Imhof.

== #Circaeconomy ==
Each month, the exhibiting artist creates a print sold online to support the #CIRCAECONOMY initiative. Launched with Ai Weiwei in October 2020, a percentage of the profits from each print is circulated back into helping build an economy that commissions new public art in the community, to nurture more diverse cultural industries and support emerging artists.

In May 2021, CIRCA partnered with Dazed to launch 'Class of 2021' a new global arts initiative awarding one emerging artist with a #CIRCAECONOMY cash prize of £30,000 generated from the sale of artist prints.

Profits have also been used to support institutions, including Chisenhale Gallery and The Showroom with no-strings cash grants. Since launching in October 2020, CIRCA has distributed over £500,000 in cash grants, scholarships and donations. Following their collaboration with Yoko Ono in March 2022, CIRCA donated £300,000 to the United Nations Central Emergency Response Fund.

== Programme ==
Since its launch in October 2020, CIRCA has commissioned new-media work from emerging and established artists every month. The work is often socially involved and motivated by the desire to engage with public discourse and debate. For three minutes each day, a monthly rotating digital art program pauses the commercial advertisements on London's iconic Piccadilly Lights, Seoul's K-Pop Square and Tokyo's Yunika Vision.

On the occasion of British artist David Hockney presenting his iPad drawing “Remember you cannot look at the sun or death for very long,” in May 2021, a total of 85 screens, including New York Times Square and Pendry West Hollywood joined CIRCA in presenting the largest digital art exhibition in the world.

The CIRCA public art program is free to attend and presented at the same time every evening - 20:20 throughout the year 2020 and 20:21 throughout the year 2021, and so forth. It is also streamed on the CIRCA website.

=== CIRCA 20:20 ===
- October – Ai Weiwei
- November – Cauleen Smith with The Showroom
- December – Eddie Peake
- New Years' Eve - Anne Imhof

=== CIRCA 20:21 ===
- January – Patti Smith
- February – Tony Cokes
- March – Emma Talbot with Collezione Maramotti
- April – James Barnor with Serpentine Galleries
- 8 April - Vivienne Westwood
- May – David Hockney
- June – Nikita Gale with Chisenhale Gallery
- July – London Zeitgeist Group Show: Alvaro Barrington, Larry Achiampong, Matt Copson, Hannah Quinlan & Rosie Hastings
- August – Sojung Jun with Seoul Museum of Art
- September - CIRCA PRIZE 2021
- October - Where Do We Go From Now?
- November - Hetain Patel
- December - AA Bronson & General Idea

=== CIRCA 20:22 ===
- January – Arca
- February – Kandis Williams with Pompey Commitment
- March – Yoko Ono with Serpentine Galleries
- April – Simon Fujiwara
- May – Agnes Denes
- June/August - Marina Abramović
- September – London Zeitgeist Group Show: Alvaro Barrington, Larry Achiampong, Matt Copson, Hannah Quinlan & Rosie Hastings and Anne Imhof
- August – Sojung Jun with Seoul Museum of Art
- September - CIRCA PRIZE 2022
- 1-4 October - Shirin Neshat
- October - Laure Prouvost
- November - Michèle Lamy
- December - Douglas Gordon

=== CIRCA 20:23 ===
- January – Dalai Lama
- February – Anne Imhof
- March – Pussy Riot
- April – Laurie Anderson
- May/June – Frank Bowling
- June/August - Dick Jewell
- September – CIRCA PRIZE 2023 Cemile Sahin for her movie Four Ballads for my Father – Spring (2022)
- October – Gilbert & George
- November – Alfredo Jaar
- December – Olaolu Slawn

== Notable events ==
- August–September 2020: Fine art students from the 'Class of 2020' whose graduation shows were cancelled due to COVID-19 were exhibited on the Piccadilly Lights screen for two months, in the build up to the official launch. Over 60 students were exhibited on the 4K screen - one graduate student each day.
- 31 October 2020: On Halloween night Chinese artist Ai Weiwei set a record on Piccadilly Lights as his film 'CIRCA 2020' became the longest-ever single piece of content to be displayed on the giant illuminated billboard. Ai Weiwei's film ran for just over an hour, pausing the regular advertisements at precisely 20:20 GMT, joining together the 30 parts of his month-long CIRCA residency.
- 1 January 2021: CIRCA commissioned two live performances from Patti Smith to help put an end to 2020 and beckon in the new year. The New Years Eve screening in Piccadilly Circus was eventually cancelled due to COVID-19 restrictions but the performance was still broadcast for free via the Circa YouTube Channel on 31 December to an audience of over 1.5million people around the world: “Some of the work I did in my bedroom, some in a recording studio and some at my desk,” says Smith in an interview with The Guardian. “I had to teach myself how to use Photo Booth on my computer and film myself reading a poem. I'm sure there are 14-year-olds who can do this in five minutes but it took me quite a while. But I got there and I'm so proud of myself.”
- April 2021: The CIRCA and Serpentine Galleries collaborative presentation of James Barnor's work on the Piccadilly Lights screen completes a journey that began more than half a century ago, when Barnor photographed BBC Africa Service presenter Mike Eghan against the backdrop of Piccadilly's neon signs in 1967. That electrifying image was the inspiration behind Ferdinando Verderi's Italian Vogue cover, with Barnor remote-shooting model Adwoa Aboah standing in the exact same location to create a present reflection on the past.
- April 2021: To celebrate her 80th Birthday, British fashion designer Vivienne Westwood was commissioned by CIRCA to present a new video work created with her brother titled 'Don't Buy a Bomb' an 'anti-war' message presented for ten minutes on the Piccadilly Lights screen. In the ten-minute film, the punk icon performed a rewritten rendition of "Without You" from My Fair Lady to offer a stark warning of societal indifference to the looming environmental catastrophes, a cry against the arms trade, and its link to climate change. "I have a plan 2 save the World. Capitalism is a war economy + war is the biggest polluter, therefore Stop War + change economy 2 fair distribution of wealth at the same time: NO MANS LAND. Let's be clear, U + I can't stop war just like that. But we can stop arms production + that would halt climate change cc + financial Crash. Long term this will stop war."
- 1 May 2021: British artist David Hockney's 2.5minute iPad drawing of a sunrise titled “Remember you cannot look at the sun or death for very long,” was broadcast by CIRCA across digital billboard screens in London's Piccadilly Circus, New York's Times Square and prominent locations in Los Angeles, Tokyo and the largest outdoor screen in Seoul.
