= Maria Isabel Sánchez Vegara =

Children's book author

Maria Isabel Sánchez Vegara is the creator and author behind the bestselling children's biography series, Little People, BIG DREAMS. The series is published by Frances Lincoln Children's Books, an imprint of The Quarto Group.

== Biography ==
Sánchez Vegara grew up in Barcelona, Spain in the 1970s. From a young age, she started reading the work of Spanish poet, Gloria Fuertes, whose writing inspired her to one day follow in similar footsteps. However, she studied advertising at university and started her career working as a copywriter and creative director. Then in 2012, after twenty years in the advertising industry, she self-published her first book: a creative journal for adults called ME. The Book of Your Life. She printed one thousand copies and sold them over the course of a year.

It was the birth of her twin nieces, Alba and Claudia, that inspired her to write children's books. After struggling to find any books for them about real-life heroines, the idea behind the series was born. The books were first released in Spain in 2014 as Pequeña&GRANDE by Alba Editorial and then in English in 2016 under the Little People, BIG DREAMS brand. In 2019, after hearing there were lots of little boys also enjoying the books, she decided to start writing the stories of influential men too.

Since then, she has published over 100 Little People, BIG DREAMS books. A notable success was the King Charles book which took top spot in the UK Official Top 50 charts for two weeks in a row after the Queen Elizabeth book broke the top ten. She also worked with ther publisher to produce a new range of Happy Meals which included abridged versions of her books. In 2025, it was announced that she is co-authoring a book of Palestinian fables, called Under the Olive Moon, with Nour Ferwana a mother from Gaza, to be published in October 2026.

While The Quarto Group publishes the series, Sánchez Vegara remains highly involved in the editorial process, acting as creative director. She helps to decide which influential people to feature and she chooses the illustrators for each title, often trying to find a commonality between the artist and the figure they are drawing. 2026 marks the tenth anniversary of the series.

Sánchez Vegara still lives in near Barcelona with her partner.
