= Tomoaki Suzuki =

Japanese artist (born 1972)

Tomoaki Suzuki (born 1972) is a Japanese artist born in Ibaraki, Japan. He trained in figurative sculpture at Tokyo Zokei University. The artist then completed an MA in Fine Art at Goldsmiths, University of London, and another in Sculpture at City & Guilds Art School.

== Work ==
His practice specialises in creating urban portraits, carved into lime wood on a miniature scale and then painted. He often searches his local neighbourhoods for young people dressed distinctively to use as models. His work engages with the changing face of fashion and youth culture, investigating the methods people use to establish their individuality.

In 2012 Suzuki's sculpture Carson was exhibited on the High Line in New York. The artist has been exhibited internationally at major institutions, such as the Art Institute of Chicago, National Gallery of Victoria, the Barbican, and at the Palais de Tokyo, Paris. A selection of sculptures from the artist's exhibition at Corvi-Mora was included in the 2017 Royal Academy Summer Exhibition.
