= Corvi-Mora =

Art gallery in London

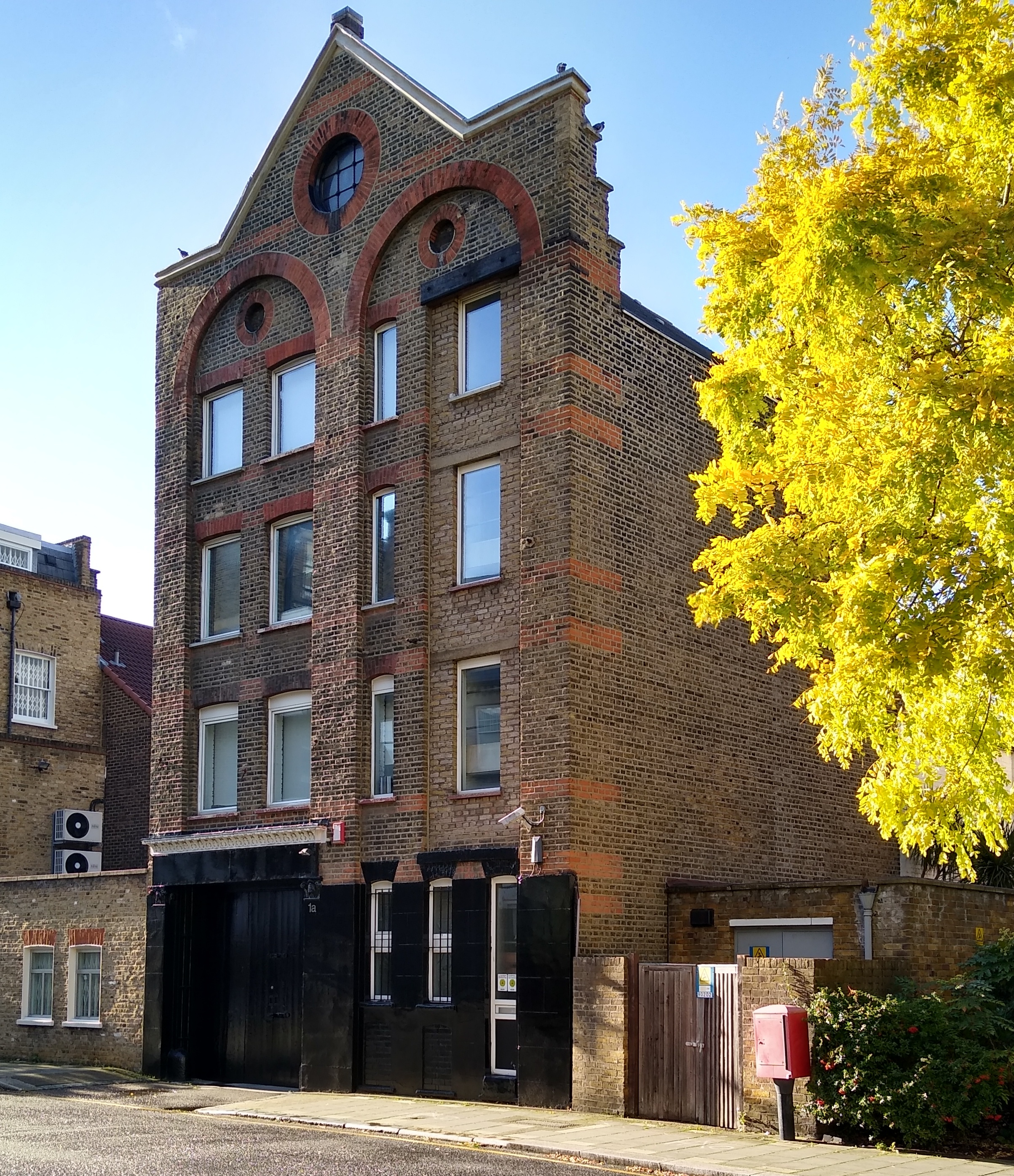
- Established: 19 January 2000; 26 years ago
- Location: London, SE11
- Coordinates: 51.491168°N 0.108423°W
- Type: Art Gallery, Modern Art, Contemporary Art
- Founder: Tommaso Corvi-Mora
- Public transit access: Kennington; Elephant & Castle
- Website: www.corvi-mora.com

Corvi-Mora is a contemporary art gallery based in Kennington, South London. The gallery represents emerging and established international artists including Turner Prize nominees Roger Hiorns and Lynette Yiadom-Boakye.

== History ==
Corvi-Mora was founded by Tommaso Corvi-Mora in 2000 at premises in London's Warren Street after the closure of the gallery Robert Prime which he founded in partnership with Gregorio Magnani in 1995. Corvi-Mora moved to a space on Kempsford Road in 2004 with the contemporary art gallery greengrassi.

Notable exhibitions include Sorrow for A Cipher by Lynette Yiadom-Boakye in 2016, Roger Hiorns in 2004 and 2015, The Commune Itself Becomes a Super State by Liam Gillick in 2007, Rachel Feinstein in 2007, and Richard Hawkins in 2009.

The gallery currently represents over 30 artists, including Dominique Gonzalez-Foerster, Lynette Yiadom-Boakye, Alvaro Barrington, Jennifer Packer, Brian Calvin and Tomoaki Suzuki.
