= Robert Prime =

Coordinates: 51.5242°N 0.1395°W

Robert Prime was a gallery in London in the late 1990s. Founded by Tommaso Corvi-Mora and Gregorio Magnani, it held the first exhibitions in London of artists including Dominique Gonzalez-Foerster, Isa Genzken, Philippe Parreno and General Idea. It also hosted the first exhibitions of artists including Rachel Feinstein, Martin Maloney, Vydia Galstaldon and Jean-Michel Wicker. The gallery closed in December 1999.
