= Boatyard Music & Film Studio =

- Parent company: Tanyard Youth Project Ltd.
- Founded: November 2009
- Status: Active
- Country of origin: Wales, United Kingdom
- Location: Pembroke
- Official website: http://www.boatyardstudio.org.uk

Boatyard Music & Film Studio is a youth and community facility in Pembroke, Pembrokeshire, Wales. It is operated by the Tanyard Youth Project and was built with funds from the National Lottery's Big Lottery Fund.

== History and overview ==
In April 2009, the Tanyard received £367,807 in grant money to buy the building, renovate it, and equip the studio with the latest music technology equipment. The grant also funded a Music and Film Technician's post for three years. In July 2009, James Harding took up this post and oversaw the building work and equipment installation.

The studio opened its doors for the first time to the youth of the Tanyard Youth Project in November 2009. In April 2010, Jonathan Thomas from the Ospreys (rugby team), opened the studio officially during an open public event. Shortly after the studio featured in the National Lottery's BIG Magazine

Since opening in November 2009, the Boatyard has played a role in over 400 young peoples and 100 adults lives through music and film activities. It has to date produced 12 short films from various genres all of which are available to watch on its website (listed below) and via YouTube.

In June 2011, the Boatyard Studio was nominated for a The National Lottery's Good Causes Awards for "Best Arts Project." Out of eight hundred and fifty projects nominated for the award the Boatyard Studio made it into the final ten. This nomination gained the studio and the studio attention with newspapers such as the Western Telegraph, the Milford Mercury and the South Wales Argus. The studio was also mentioned on Real Radio and BBC Radio One as part of a public vote campaign.
