= Brenda Rawnsley =

British arts campaigner

- Born: 31 July 1916; Oxford, Oxfordshire
- Died: 25 June 2007 (aged 90); Milford on the Sea, Hampshire

Brenda Rawnsley (31 July 1916 – 25 June 2007) was a British arts campaigner who devised and managed the innovative School Prints scheme that provided artwork to primary schools. She was decorated for her services during the Second World War.

== Early life ==
Brenda Mary Rawnsley (née Hugh-Jones) was born on 31 July 1916 in Oxford, Oxfordshire. She was educated at Queen Anne's School, Caversham, before winning a scholarship to the University of Oxford.

== Career ==
=== Second World War ===
In 1939, Rawnsley enlisted in the ATS Officer Cadet training unit, but soon left to work for the Ministry of Economic Warfare in London. In 1941 she became a Women's Auxiliary Air Force officer and was posted abroad, working in Heliopolis, RAF Ramleh in Palestine, Alexandria and Algiers. Later, in England, she worked with Duncan Sandys forecasting the course of flying bombs (V1s) and rockets (V2s). In June 1945 she undertook an intelligence mission to a German bomb factory in the Harz Mountains. In 1945 Rawnsley, by now a Squadron Leader, left the service with several medals.

=== The School Prints ===
In 1935, Rawnsley's future husband, Derek Rawnsley, had founded Picture Hire Limited and School Prints Limited. The former loaned original works to private homes while School Prints Ltd hired reproductions to secondary Schools. During the war, following Derek's death in 1943, School Prints Ltd was managed by Derek's assistant, Dorothy Bland.

In 1945, Rawnsley took over the running of School Prints Ltd and took advice from art historian Herbert Read. She started a new project to commission original lithographs to rent to primary Schools. In 1946 she sent letters to a large number of British artists: “We are producing a series of auto-lithographs … for use in schools, as a means of giving school children an understanding of contemporary art. By keeping the price as low as possible, we are able to bring this scheme … within reach of all Education Authorities.”

The selected artists were asked to produce a lithograph using no more than six colours, to help with mass production. Artists in the first two series of prints produced in 1946 and 1947 included John Nash (Harvesting, 1947), Feliks Topolski (This England, 1946), John Skeaping, David Gentleman, Edwin La Dell (Tower of London, 1945), Hans Feibusch, L.S. Lowry (Punch and Judy, 1946), Michael Rothenstein, Julian Trevelyan (Harbour, 1946) and John Tunnard. The lithographs were printed from stone or zinc plates by Thomas Griffiths and the Baynard Press.

In 1947, Rawnsley flew to France and convinced Pablo Picasso (Composition, 1948) Georges Braque, Henri Matisse, Fernand Léger and Raoul Dufy to produce lithographs for the School Prints scheme. The 'European series' was launched in 1949, consisting of six prints, the final artist being Henry Moore (Sculptural Objects, 1949).

This series was produced using innovative plastic lithographic plates called Plastocowell, which were developed by the printers W. S. Cowell Ltd.'s of Ipswich. The resulting plastic sheets are now in the collection of the Tate.

Unlike the earlier lithographs the more modernist series wasn't popular with schools and ultimately led to the later financial failure of School Prints Ltd, but at its peak there were 4,000 schools subscribed to the scheme. Alongside the lithographic commissions, Rawnsley continued with the original business of hiring reproductions of well-known paintings to schools. In the 1950s this was expanded to industry and then to hospitals.

In the 1970s, The Observer, through Observer Art, which sold prints to its readers, agreed to sell all the remaining European prints and in 1989 the remaining School Prints stock was bought by Merivale Editions.

=== Later life ===
Rawnsley was elected to the position of Master of the Fine Art Trade Guild (1961–62). Later Brenda Rawnsley moved to Stradishall in Suffolk and worked as a librarian before retiring to Milford on Sea for the last 20-years of her life.

== Personal life ==
Rawnsley (née Hugh-Jones) married Flt Lt Derek Rawnsley in February 1941 but he died in an accident in February 1943. In 1949 Rawnsley married Geoffrey Keighley and they had one son before the marriage was dissolved in 1952.

== Death and legacy ==
Rawnsley died in Milford on Sea, Hampshire on 25 June 2007.

The School Prints have become highly collectible. In 2007, Rawnsley and the School Prints featured in an exhibition at Pallant House Gallery, Art of the Classroom: School Prints 1946-49.

=== The Hepworth Wakefield's School Prints ===
In 2018 The Hepworth Wakefield, inspired by Rawnsley's School Prints scheme, launched a 5-year project, School Prints, commissioning artists including Rose Wylie, Peter Blake and Linder Sterling to produce prints which are then donated to local primary schools. In 2020, in partnership with the Turner Contemporary the scheme was extended to local Margate schools. The fourth edition of the project in 2021 featured six black artists to support the teaching of black histories. The artists were Hurvin Anderson, Alvaro Barrington, Frank Bowling, Lubaina Himid, Claudette Johnson and Yinka Shonibare.
