= Little People, Big Dreams =

Children's book series

- Author: Maria Isabel Sánchez Vegara
- Language: English
- Genre: Children's literature
- Publisher: The Quarto Group
- Published: Since 2016; 10 years ago
- Website: littlepeoplebigdreams.com

Little People, Big Dreams is a series of children's books by Maria Isabel Sánchez Vegara. The series explores the lives of notable people, from designers and artists to scientists and activists. The books are told as a story with illustrations from over 70 different artists. A section containing facts, photos and a timeline is shown at the back of the book. As of 2023, the collection includes over 100 books and sold over 15 million copies worldwide.

== List of books ==
Little People, Big Dreams Book Collection
Title	Illustrator	ISBN (US)	ISBN (UK)	Format	Size	Publish Date
Hayao Miyazaki	Momoko Abe	-	-	-	-	2026
Ed Sheeran	Mariajo Ilustrajo	-	-	-	-	2026
Erno Rubik	Ben Javens	-	-	-	-	2026
Alexander Hamilton	Anna Aronson	-	-	-	-	2026
Cristiano Ronaldo	João Fazenda	-	-	-	-	2026
William Shakespeare	Andrea Stegmaier	-	-	-	-	2026
Leonardo da Vinci	Ana Albero	-	-	-	-	2026
Rihanna	Niña Mata	-	-	-	-	2026
Beatrix Potter	Sara Rhys	-	-	-	-	2026
Oprah Winfrey	Sera Laterell	9781836007500	9781836007494	Hardcover, 32 pages	27.5 cm W | 700 g Wt	January 13, 2026
Steven Spielberg	Keith Negley		9781836007456	, 32 pages	27.5 cm W | 700 g Wt	October 9, 2025
Chris Hoy	Edita Hajdu		9781805700418	Hardback, 32 pages	27.5 cm W | 700 g Wt	October 9, 2025
Louis Braille	Ana Albero		9781836007401	Hardback, 32 pages	27.5 cm W | 700 g Wt	September 4, 2025
Virginia Woolf	Audrey Day		9781836007203	Hardback, 32 pages	27.5 cm W | 700 g Wt	August 7, 2025
Bob Marley	Subi Bosa		9781836007166	Hardback, 32 pages	27.5 cm W | 700 g Wt	July 10, 2025
Yves Saint Laurent	Klas Fahlén		9781836006619	Hardback, 32 pages	27.5 cm W | 700 g Wt	June 5, 2025
Mary Earps	Ana Gómez		9781836006572	Hardback, 32 pages	27.5 cm W | 700 g Wt	May 8, 2025
William Kamkwamba	Kirsti Beautyman		9781836005186	Hardback, 32 pages	27.5 cm W | 700 g Wt	April 10, 2025
Harry Styles	Lizzie Knott		9781836005148	Hardback, 32 pages	27.5 cm W | 700 g Wt	April 3, 2025
Yayoi Kusama	Ryoko Ichikawa		9780711292963	Hardback, 32 pages	Published: February 6, 2025	February 6, 2025
David Beckham	Fernando Martín		9780711298163	Hardback, 32 pages	27.5 cm W | 700 g Wt	January 23, 2025
Patrick Mahomes	Guilherme Karsten		9781836005070	Hardback, 32 pages	Published: January 23, 2025	January 23, 2025
Katherine Johnson	Jemma Skidmore		9781836001768	Hardback, 32 pages	Published: January 9, 2025	January 9, 2025
Mikaela Shiffrin	Anastasia Ryzhkova	9781805701552	9781805701545	Hardback, 32 pages	445 x 296.50 cm (H x W)	January 8, 2025
Mary Kom	Jen Khatun In	9780711298101	9780711298095	Hardback, 32 pages	9.449in x 7.677in / 240mm x 195mm	October 3, 2024
Salvador Dalí	Mariona Tolosa Sisteré	9781836000204	9781836000198	Hardback, 32 pages	9.449in x 7.677in / 240mm x 195mm	October 3, 2024
Antoine de Saint-Exupéry	Martin Le Lapin	9780711292062	9780711292055	Hardback, 32 pages	9.449in x 7.677in / 240mm x 195mm	October 3, 2024
Vincent van Gogh	Alette Straathof	9780711292024	9780711292017	Hardback, 32 pages	9.449in x 7.677in / 240mm x 195mm	September 5, 2024
Leonard Cohen	Agathe Bray-Bourret		9780711294721	Hardback, 32 pages	27.5 cm W | 700 g Wt	August 8, 2024
Stan Lee	Ana Albero Be		9780711292093	Hardback, 32 pages	9.449in x 7.677in / 240mm x 195mm	July 4, 2024
Rafa Nadal	Rocio Ledesma	9780711298613	9780711298606	Hardback, 32 pages	9.449in x 7.677in / 240mm x 195mm	June 6, 2024
Usain Bolt	Karen Crosbie		9780711291973	Hardback, 32 pages	9.449in x 7.677in / 240mm x 195mm	June 6, 2024
Beyoncé	Jade Orlando		9780711292130	Hardback, 32 pages	9.449in x 7.677in / 240mm x 195mm	April 4, 2024
Taylor Swift	Borghild Fallberg Inspire		9780711295087	Hardback, 32 pages	9.449in x 7.677in / 240mm x 195mm	April 4, 2024
Kylie Minogue	Rebecca Gibbon		9780711292734	Hardback, 32 pages	9.449in x 7.677in / 240mm x 195mm	March 7, 2024
Lenny Henry	Diane Ewen		9780711285408	Hardback, 32 pages	9.449in x 7.677in / 240mm x 195mm	February 8, 2024
Tenzing Norgay	Bandana Tulachan		9780711285705	Hardback, 32 pages	9.449in x 7.677in / 240mm x 195mm	February 1, 2024
Sally Ride	Alona Millgram Be		9780711291508	Hardback, 32 pages	9.449in x 7.677in / 240mm x 195mm	January 4, 2024
Leo Messi	Florencia Gavilán		9780711290570	Hardback, 32 pages	9.449in x 7.677in / 240mm x 195mm	October 5, 2023
Princess Diana	Archita Khosla	9780711283077	9780711283060	Hardback, 32 pages	9.449in x 7.677in / 240mm x 195mm	September 7, 2023
Olive Morris	Aurelia Durand	9780711285675	9780711285668	Hardback, 32 pages	9.449in x 7.677in / 240mm x 195mm	June 8, 2023
Vanessa Nakate	Olivia Amoah	9780711285453	9780711285446	Hardback, 32 pages	9.449in x 7.677in / 240mm x 195mm	April 13, 2023
King Charles	Matt Hunt	9780711286696	9780711286689	Hardback, 32 pages	9.449in x 7.677in / 240mm x 195mm	April 6, 2023
Amanda Gorman	Queenbe Monyei Meet	9780711284456		Paperback, 32 pages	9.5in x 7.6in / 241.3mm x 193.04mm	April 6, 2023
David Hockney	Ana Albero Read	9780711285491	9780711285484	Hardback, 32 pages	9.449in x 7.677in / 240mm x 195mm	April 6, 2023
Lewis Hamilton	Fernando Martín Meet	9780711283169	9780711283152	HB, 32 pages	9.449in x 7.677in / 240mm x 195mm	March 9, 2023
Louis Pasteur	Shelly Laslo	9780711283138	9780711283121	Hardback, 32 pages	9.449in x 7.677in / 240mm x 195mm	March 9, 2023
Shakira	Laura Diez As	9780711283107	9780711283091	Hardback, 32 pages	9.449in x 7.677in / 240mm x 195mm	February 9, 2023
Freddie Mercury	Ruby Taylor Meet	9780711271081	9780711271067	Hardback, 32 pages	9.449in x 7.677in / 240mm x 195mm	February 9, 2023
Hedy Lamarr	Maggie Cole From the critically acclaimed	9780711246690	9780711246683	Hardback, 32 pages	9.449in x 7.677in / 240mm x 195mm	January 5, 2023
Terry Fox	T	9780711276628	9780711276604	Hardback, 32 pages	9.449in x 7.677in / 240mm x 195mm	November 1, 2022
Anna Pavlova	Sue Downing	9780711271128	9780711271104	Hardback, 32 pages	9.449in x 7.677in / 240mm x 195mm	November 1, 2022
Dwayne Johnson	Lirios Bou Born	9780711281554	9780711281547	Hardback, 32 pages	9.449in x 7.677in / 240mm x 195mm	October 4, 2022
Helen Keller	Sam Rudd In	9780711259546	9780711259522	Hardback, 32 pages	9.449in x 7.677in / 240mm x 195mm	October 4, 2022
Queen Elizabeth	Melissa Lee Johnson In this book from the critically acclaimed	9780711274501	9780711274495	Hardback, 32 pages	9.449in x 7.677in / 240mm x 195mm	September 27, 2022
Mae Jemison	Janna Morton In	9780711270954	9780711270930	Hardback, 32 pages	9.449in x 7.677in / 240mm x 195mm	September 13, 2022
Nikola Tesla	Alexander Mostov From	9780711270831	9780711270817	Hardback, 32 pages	9.449in x 7.677in / 240mm x 195mm	September 6, 2022
Laverne Cox	Olivia Daisy Coles	9780711270916	9780711270893	Hardback, 32 pages	9.449in x 7.677in / 240mm x 195mm	September 6, 2022
Marcus Rashford	Guilherme Karsten In this book from the highly acclaimed	9780711270992	9780711270978	Hardback, 32 pages	9.449in x 7.677in / 240mm x 195mm	September 6, 2022
Wilma Mankiller	Alexandra Bowman In	9780711271203	9780711271180	Hardback, 32 pages	0.384in x 0.311in / 9.75mm x 7.9mm	August 30, 2022
Neil Armstrong	Christophe Jacques In	9780711271036	9780711271012	Hardback, 32 pages	9.449in x 7.677in / 240mm x 195mm	August 16, 2022
Elvis Presley	Ana Albero In	9780711270879	9780711270855	Hardback, 32 pages	9.449in x 7.677in / 240mm x 195mm	July 12, 2022
David Attenborough	Mikyo Noh Meet		9780711266599	Board book, 24 pages	4.98 in x 6.14 in / 126.5 mm x 156 mm	July 5, 2022
Alexander von Humboldt	Sally Agar In	9780711271241	9780711271227	Hardback, 32 pages	9.449in x 7.677in / 240mm x 195mm	June 28, 2022
J. R. R. Tolkien	Aaron Cushley In this book from the highly acclaimed	9780711257870	9780711257856	Hardback, 32 pages	9.449in x 7.677in / 240mm x 195mm	April 26, 2022
Florence Nightingale	Kelsey Garrity-Riley In this book from the highly acclaimed	9780711270794	9780711270770	Hardback, 32 pages	9.449in x 7.677in / 240mm x 195mm	April 12, 2022
Harry Houdini	Juliana Vido Meet	9780711259454	9780711259447	Hardback, 32 pages	9.449in x 7.677in / 240mm x 195mm	April 12, 2022
Gloria Steinem	Lucila Perini Meet	9780711270756	9780711270732	Hardback, 32 pages	9.449in x 7.677in / 240mm x 195mm	February 1, 2022
Nelson Mandela	Alison Hawkins Meet	9780711257917	9780711257894	Hardback, 32 pages	9.449in x 7.677in / 240mm x 195mm	January 4, 2022
Pablo Picasso	Teresa Bellon Meet	9780711259508	9780711259485	Hardback, 32 pages	9.449in x 7.677in / 240mm x 195mm	January 4, 2022
Michael Jordan	Lo Harris Meet	9780711259386	9780711259362	Hardback, 32 pages	9.449in x 7.677in / 240mm x 195mm	December 7, 2021
Albert Einstein	Jean Claude Meet	9780711257580	9780711257566	Hardback, 32 pages	9.449in x 7.677in / 240mm x 195mm	November 9, 2021
Charles Dickens	Isobel Ross	9780711258969	9780711258945	Hardback, 32 pages	9.449in x 7.677in / 240mm x 195mm	November 9, 2021
Yoko Ono	Momoko Abe	9780711259300	9780711259287	Hardback, 32 pages	9.449in x 7.677in / 240mm x 195mm	November 9, 2021
Kamala Harris	Lauren Semmer Meet	9780711265820	9780711265813	Hardcover, pages	9.449in x 7.677in / 240mm x 195mm	September 7, 2021
Marilyn Monroe	Ana Albero Meet	9780711257795	9780711257771	Hardcover, pages	9.449in x 7.677in / 240mm x 195mm	September 7, 2021
Steve Jobs	Aura Lewis Buy this book	9780711266568	9780711266551	Board book, 24 pages	x / x	August 24, 2021
Greta Thunberg	Anke Weckmann Buy this book	9780711266582	9780711266575	Board book, 24 pages	x / x	August 24, 2021
Martin Luther King Jr.	Mai Ly Degnan Buy this book	9780711266544	9780711266537	Board book, 24 pages	6in x 5in / 152.4mm x 127mm	August 10, 2021
Iris Apfel	Kristen Barnhart Meet	9780711259003	9780711258983	Hardcover, 32 pages	9.449in x 7.677in / 240mm x 195mm	August 3, 2021
Rosalind Franklin	Naomi Wilkinson Meet	9780711259577	9780711259560	Hardcover, 32 pages	7.68 in x 9.45 in / 195 mm x 240 mm	August 3, 2021
Ruth Bader Ginsburg	Judit Orosz Meet	9780711264700	9780711264687	Hardcover, pages	9.449in x 7.677in / 240mm x 195mm	August 3, 2021
Michelle Obama	Mia Saine Meet	9780711259423	9780711259409	Hardcover, 32 pages	7.68 in x 9.45 in / 195 mm x 240 mm	July 20, 2021
Mindy Kaling	Roza Nozari Meet	9780711259263	9780711259249	Hardcover, 32 pages	7.68 in x 9.45 in / 195 mm x 240 mm	July 6, 2021
RuPaul	Wednesday Holmes Meet	9780711246812	9780711246805	Hardcover, pages	9.449in x 7.677in / 240mm x 195mm	May 4, 2021
Andy Warhol	Timothy Hunt Meet	9780711257955	9780711257931	Hardcover, pages	Published: May 4, 2021	May 4, 2021
Earth Heroes	Anke Weckmann Meet	9780711261396	9780711261389	SB, 96 pages	9.921in x 8.425in / 252mm x 214mm	April 20, 2021
Hans Christian Andersen	Maxine Lee-Mackie Meet	9780711259348	9780711259324	Hardcover, 32 pages	7.68 in x 9.45 in / 195 mm x 240 mm	April 6, 2021
Mary Anning	Popy Matigot Meet	9780711255548	9780711255517	Hardcover, pages	9.449in x 7.677in / 240mm x 195mm	March 2, 2021
Malala Yousafzai	Manal Mirza Meet	9780711259041	9780711259027	Hardcover, pages	9.449in x 7.677in / 240mm x 195mm	March 2, 2021
Stevie Wonder	Melissa Lee Johnson	9780711257757	9780711257733	Hardback, 32 pages	9.449in x 7.677in / 240mm x 195mm	February 23, 2021
Megan Rapinoe	Paulina Morgan Meet	9780711257832	9780711257818	Hardcover, pages	9.449in x 7.677in / 240mm x 195mm	February 16, 2021
Prince	Cachetejack Meet Prince	9780711254398	9780711254374	Hardcover, pages	9.449in x 7.677in / 240mm x 195mm	January 5, 2021
Charles Darwin	Mark Hoffman Meet	9780711257719	9780711257696	Hardcover, pages	9.449in x 7.677in / 240mm x 195mm	January 5, 2021
Captain Tom Moore	Christophe Jacques Meet	9780711262096	9780711262072	Hardback, 32 pages	9.449in x 7.677in / 240mm x 195mm	December 15, 2020
John Lennon	Octavia Bromell Meet	9780711257672	9780711257658	Hardback, 32 pages	9.449in x 7.677in / 240mm x 195mm	December 8, 2020
Black Voices	Lisbeth Kaiser Meet	9780711262539	9780711262522	SB, 96 pages	9.921in x 8.425in / 252mm x 214mm	November 3, 2020
Elton John	Sophie Beer Meet	9780711258402	9780711258389	Hardback, 32 pages	9.449in x 7.48in / 240mm x 190mm	October 13, 2020
Louise Bourgeois	Helena Perez Garcia	9780711246904	9780711246898	Hardback, 32 pages	9.449in x 7.677in / 240mm x 195mm	October 6, 2020
Ayrton Senna	Alex G Griffiths	9780711246720	9780711246713	Hardback, 32 pages	9.449in x 7.677in / 240mm x 195mm	October 6, 2020
Ernest Shackleton	Olivia Holden Meet	9780711245716	9780711245709	Hardback, 32 pages	9.449in x 7.677in / 240mm x 195mm	September 1, 2020
Pele	Camila Rosa Meet	9780711245730	9780711245747	Hardback, 32 pages	9.449in x 7.677in / 240mm x 195mm	September 1, 2020
Corazon Aquino	Ginnie Hsu Meet	9780711246843	9780711246836	Hardback, 32 pages	9.449in x 7.677in / 240mm x 195mm	August 4, 2020
Aretha Franklin	Amy Blackwell Meet	9780711246867	9780711246874	Hardback, 32 pages	9.449in x 7.677in / 240mm x 195mm	August 4, 2020
Jean-Michel Basquiat	Luciano Lozano Meet	9780711245808	9780711245792	Hardback, 32 pages	9.449in x 7.677in / 240mm x 195mm	June 16, 2020
Dolly Parton	Daria Solak Meet	9780711246256	9780711246249	Board book, 24 pages	0.24in x 0.197in / 6.1mm x 5mm	June 16, 2020
Wilma Rudolph	Amelia Flower Meet	9780711246270	9780711246263	Board book, 24 pages	6.1in x 5in / 154.94mm x 127mm	June 16, 2020
Coloring Book	Lisbeth Kaiser Grab	9780711261365	9780711261358	Paperback, 32 pages	11in x 8.5in / 279.4mm x 215.9mm	June 2, 2020
Jesse Owens	Anna Katharina Jansen	9780711245839	9780711245822	Hardback, 32 pages	0.384in x 0.307in / 9.75mm x 7.8mm	June 2, 2020
Mahatma Gandhi	Albert Arrayas Meet	9780711246096	9780711246089	Board book, 24 pages	6.142in x 4.98in / 156mm x 126.5mm	May 26, 2020
David Bowie	Ana Albero Meet	9780711246119	9780711246102	Board book, 24 pages	6.142in x 4.98in / 156mm x 126.5mm	May 26, 2020
Billie Jean King	Miranda Sofroniou Meet	9780711246935	9780711246928	Hardback, 32 pages	9.449in x 7.677in / 240mm x 195mm	May 5, 2020
Alan Turing	Ashling Lindsay Meet	9780711246782	9780711246775	Hardback, 32 pages	9.449in x 7.677in / 240mm x 195mm	April 7, 2020
Bob Dylan	Conrad Roset Meet	9780711246751	9780711246744	Hardback, 32 pages	9.449in x 7.677in / 240mm x 195mm	April 7, 2020
Maria Montessori	Raquel Martín Meet	9780711245938	9780711245921	Board book, 24 pages	0.244in x 0.197in / 6.2mm x 5mm	March 3, 2020
Vivienne Westwood	Laura Callaghan Meet	9780711245952	9780711245945	Board book, 24 pages	6.2in x 5in / 157.48mm x 127mm	March 3, 2020
Astrid Lindgren	Linzie Hunter Meet	9780711252172	9781786037626	Hardback, 32 pages	0.374in x 0.303in / 9.5mm x 7.7mm	March 3, 2020
Evonne Goolagong	Lisa Koesterke Meet	9780711245860	9780711245853	Hardback, 32 pages	0.374in x 0.303in / 9.5mm x 7.7mm	March 3, 2020
Frida Kahlo Doll and Book Set	Gee Fan Eng	9780711248861	9780711248878	Board book, 24 pages	6.5in x 8in / 165.1mm x 203.2mm	March 3, 2020
Muhammad Ali	Brosmind Meet Muhammad	9780711245891	9780711245884	Board book, 24 pages	6.142in x 4.98in / 156mm x 126.5mm	February 4, 2020
Stephen Hawking	Matt Hunt Meet	9780711245914	9780711245907	Board book, 24 pages	6.142in x 4.98in / 156mm x 126.5mm	February 4, 2020
Inspiring Writers	Lisbeth Kaiser Meet	9780711243217	9780711243200	SB, 96 pages	9.921in x 8.425in / 252mm x 214mm	October 1, 2019
Mary Shelley	Yelena Bryksenkova Meet	9781786037480	9781786037473	Hardback, 32 pages	9.8in x 8in / 248.92mm x 203.2mm	October 1, 2019
Zaha Hadid	Asun Amar Meet	9781786037459	9781786037442	Hardback, 32 pages	9.8in x 8in / 248.92mm x 203.2mm	October 1, 2019
Bruce Lee	Miguel Bustos Meet	9781786037893	9781786033352	Hardback, 32 pages	9.449in x 7.677in / 240mm x 195mm	August 6, 2019
Rudolf Nureyev	Eleonora Arosio Meet	9781786037916	9781786033369	Hardback, 32 pages	9.449in x 7.677in / 240mm x 195mm	August 6, 2019
Josephine Baker	Agathe Sorlet Meet	9780711243156	9780711243149	Board book, 24 pages	6.142in x 4.98in / 156mm x 126.5mm	August 6, 2019
Jane Goodall	Beatrice Cerocchi Meet	9780711243170	9780711243163	Board book, 24 pages	6.142in x 4.98in / 156mm x 126.5mm	August 6, 2019
Lucy Maud Montgomery	Anuska Allepuz Meet	9780711243194	9780711243187	Board book, 24 pages	6.142in x 4.98in / 156mm x 126.5mm	August 6, 2019
Jane Austen	Katie Wilson Meet	9780711243071	9780711243064	Board book, 24 pages	6.142in x 4.98in / 156mm x 126.5mm	June 6, 2019
Georgia O'Keeffe	Erica Salcedo Meet	9780711243095	9780711243088	Board book, 24 pages	6.142in x 4.98in / 156mm x 126.5mm	June 6, 2019
Harriet Tubman	Pili Aguado Meet	9780711243118	9780711243101	Board book, 24 pages	6.142in x 4.98in / 156mm x 126.5mm	June 6, 2019
Ella Fitzgerald	Bàrbara Alca Meet	9781786032577	9781786032584	Board book, 24 pages	6.142in x 4.98in / 156mm x 126.5mm	February 7, 2019
Ada Lovelace	Zafouko Yamamoto Meet	9781786032591	9781786032607	Board book, 24 pages	156in x 126.5in / 3962.4mm x 3213.1mm	February 7, 2019
Emmeline Pankhurst	Ana Sanfelippo Meet	9781786032614	9781786032621	Board book, 24 pages	6.142in x 4.98in / 156mm x 126.5mm	February 7, 2019
Rosa Parks	Marta Antelo Meet	9781786032638	9781786032645	Board book, 24 pages	6.142in x 4.98in / 156mm x 126.5mm	February 7, 2019
Simone de Beauvoir	Christine Roussey Meet	9781786032324	9781786032935	Hardback, 32 pages	9.5in x 7.6in / 241.3mm x 193.04mm	October 4, 2018
L. M. Montgomery	Anuska Allepuz Meet	9781786032331	9781786032959	Hardback, 32 pages	9.5in x 7.6in / 241.3mm x 193.04mm	October 4, 2018
Emmeline Pankhurst Book and Paper Doll Gift Edition Set	Ana Sanfelippo Meet	9781786034007	9781786034052	Kit, 32 pages	10.118in x 8.268in / 257mm x 210mm	September 6, 2018
Marie Curie Book and Paper Doll Gift Edition Set	Frau Isa Meet	9781786034014	9781786034045	Kit, 32 pages	10.118in x 8.268in / 257mm x 210mm	September 6, 2018
Anne Frank	Sveta Dorosheva Meet	9781786032294	9781786032928	Hardback, 32 pages	9.5in x 7.6in / 241.3mm x 193.04mm	August 2, 2018
Mother Teresa	Natascha Rosenberg Meet	9781786032300	9781786032904	Hardback, 32 pages	9.5in x 7.6in / 241.3mm x 193.04mm	August 2, 2018
Georgia O'Keeffe	Erica Salcedo Meet	9781786031228	9781786031211	Hardback, 32 pages	0.374in x 0.299in / 9.5mm x 7.6mm	June 7, 2018
Coco Chanel	Ana Albero Meet	9781786032454	9781786032461	Board book, 24 pages	6.142in x 4.98in / 156mm x 126.5mm	March 15, 2018
Frida Kahlo	Gee Fan Eng	9781786032478	9781786032485	Board book, 24 pages	6.142in x 4.98in / 156mm x 126.5mm	March 15, 2018
Amelia Earhart	Mariadiamantes Meet Amelia	9781786032522	9781786032515	Board book, 24 pages	6.142in x 4.98in / 156mm x 126.5mm	March 15, 2018
Marie Curie	Frau Isa Meet	9781786032539	9781786032546	Board book, 24 pages	6.142in x 4.98in / 156mm x 126.5mm	March 15, 2018
Maya Angelou	Leire Salaberria Meet	9781786032492	9781786032508	Board book, 24 pages	156in x 126.5in / 3962.4mm x 3213.1mm	March 1, 2018
Audrey Hepburn	Amaia Arrazola Meet	9781786030535	9781786036841	Hardback, 32 pages	9.5in x 7.6in / 241.3mm x 193.04mm	September 7, 2017
Agatha Christie	Elisa Munso Meet	9781847809605	9781847809599	Hardback, 32 pages	9.5in x 7.6in / 241.3mm x 193.04mm	March 2, 2017
Steve Irwin	Sonny Ross	9780711285651	9780711285613	Hardback, 32 pages	9.449in x 7.677in / 240mm x 195mm	
