= Alvaro Barrington =

British artist

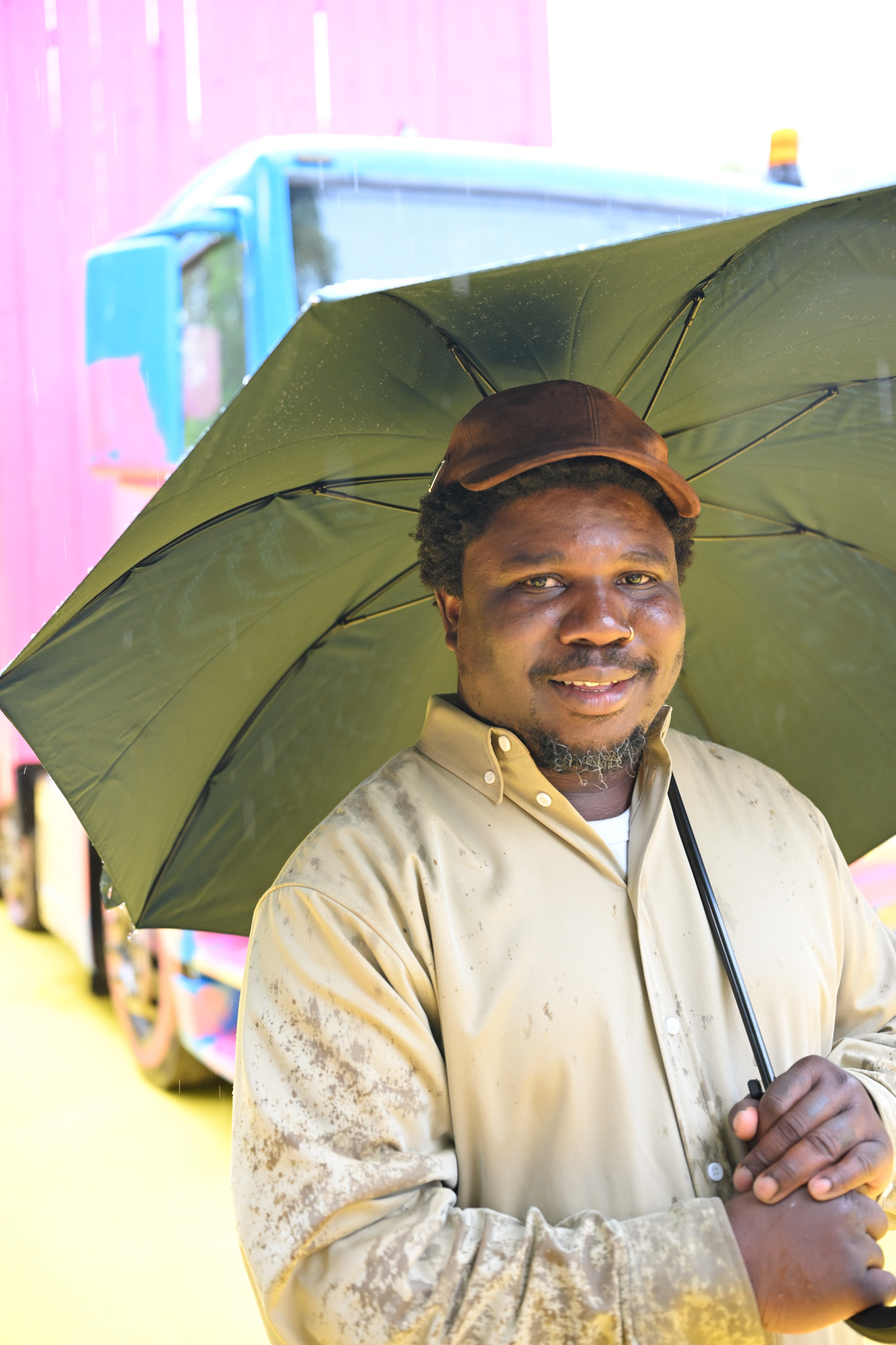
- Born: 1983 (age 42–43); Caracas, Venezuela
- Movement: Contemporary Art

Alvaro Barrington (born 1983) is a London-based artist. Primarily a painter, Barrington often incorporates yarn, wood and other media into his work.

== Early life and education ==
Alvaro Barrington was born on 1 February 1983 in Caracas, Venezuela, the son of a Grenadian mother and Haitian father. He grew up in Grenada and then from aged 8 lived in Brooklyn, New York. Barrington attended Fiorello H. LaGuardia High School and then trained at Hunter College in New York. In 2015, he moved to London and studied at the Slade School of Fine Art, completing his MFA in 2017.

== Career ==
Barrington is an artist who uses a variety of media in his paintings including wood and textiles. His work often includes Caribbean motifs, such as hibiscus and yams, and is known to rely on influences spanning art history and contemporary influences such as the prevalence of hip hop music in his youth. Barrington describes his work as being "concerned with celebrating communities in the way that they celebrate themselves, and the diverse cultural languages in which we celebrate ourselves". Barrington takes an uncommon approach to artist representation, working with multiple galleries around the world to present different strands of his work.

Barrington's first solo exhibition, at MoMA PS1 in 2017, was a re-creation of his whole London studio in the New York gallery. His first UK exhibition was Condo at Emalin in London in January 2018.

In 2019 Barrington co-curated Artists I Steal From with Julia Peyton-Jones. It featured the works of 48 artists selected by Barrington including Willem de Kooning, Cy Twombly and Katharina Grosse, alongside one of his own mixed-media pieces, Unc you the Plug (2019). Later that year Barrington collaborated with the carnival organisation United Colours of Mas, to design a float for the Notting Hill Carnival. Barrington's 2019 exhibition, GARVEY: SEX LOVE NURTURING FAMALAY, references the Jamaican political activist Marcus Garvey. It was accompanied by a publication GARVEY!.

Barrington was one of six black artists selected for the 2021 The Hepworth Wakefield's School Prints, the fourth year of a project that places free art in local primary Schools. His contribution was titled Grandma’s Hands (2020). Barrington's nostalgic Wave Your Flags exhibitions in 2021 featured paintings of the hibiscus flower in the colours of different Caribbean flags, in sculptured frames of reclaimed wood and corrugated steel. Exhibitions were presented in the UK at The Tabernacle (Wave Your Flags), at Sadie Coles HQ (Wave Your Flags II) and in the USA, as the inaugural project of Saint Georges Project (Wave Your Flags: Labor Day). Barrington's first solo show at a UK institution (non-commercial gallery) was Spider the Pig, Pig the Spider at the South London Gallery, it coincided with him being one of 31 contributors to Mixing It Up: Painting Today at London's Hayward Gallery.

In 2024, Alvaro Barrington displayed Grace at Tate Britain. The a three-part exhibition, dedicated to the themes of "Caribbean childhood," "carnival," and "urban realities," explores the artist's journey from his childhood in Grenada to his experiences in New York across the length of the Tate's Duveen Galleries. Grace was accompanied by a soundscape, evoking rain on the tin roof of Barrington’s grandmother's house in Grenada, including broadcasts from Hackney-based NTS Radio, enhancing the immersive recreation of the artist's childhood environment.

Barrington's work was featured in the group show Get in the Game: Sports, Art, Culture, which traveled from the San Francisco Museum of Modern Art, California, to the Pérez Art Museum Miami, Florida, in 2026.

=== Individual exhibitions ===
A selection of Barrington's solo exhibitions:

- Grace, Tate Britain, London, UK (2024)
- Island Life, Nicola Vassell, New York, USA (2023)
- They Got Time: YOU BELONG TO THE CITY, Thaddaeus Ropac, Paris, France (2023)
- Grandma’s Land, Sadie Coles HQ, London, UK (2023)
- The House of St Barnabas, London, UK (2023)
- Things That Are Real: Alvaro Barrington x Dean Cross, Cement Fondu, Sydney, Australia (2023)
- Human Nature, Mendes Wood DM, São Paulo, Brazil (2023)
- 91–98 jfk–lax border, Blum & Poe, Los Angeles, USA (2022)
- La Vie en Rose, Galerie Thaddeus Ropac, Salzburg, Austria (2022)
- Spider the Pig, Pig the Spider, South London Gallery, London, UK (2021)
- Wave Your Flags: Labor Day, Saint Georges Project, New York (2021)
- You don't do it for the man, men never notice. You just do it for yourself, you're the fucking coldest, Thaddaeus Ropac, Paris, France (2021)
- Garvey 2 –They eyes were watching God, Corvi-Mora, London, UK (2020)
- The Shop at Sadie Coles, London, UK (2020)
- Garvey: Sex Love Nurturing Famalay’, Sadie Coles HQ, London, UK (2019)
- Artists I Steal From, Galerie Thaddeus Ropac, London, UK (2019)
- A Taste of Chocolate, Galerie Thaddaeus Ropac, London, UK (2018)
- Condo London, Emalin, London, UK (2018)
- Alvaro Barrington, MoMA PS1, New York, USA (2017)

=== Group exhibitions ===
A selection of exhibitions that Barrington has contributed to:

- Mixing It Up: Painting Today, Hayward Gallery, London, UK (2021)
- Tt X AB "The Lot Show", a collaboration with Tessa Farrell, Mendes Wood DM, New York, US (2021)
- 'Trust Ur Global Stranger' video work commissioned by CIRCA and curated by Norman Rosenthal London, Piccadilly Circus (2021)
- School Prints, The Hepworth Wakefield, Wakefield, UK (2021)
- Tempest, Tanya Leighton, Berlin, Germany and Sadie Coles HQ, London, UK (2021)
- No horizon, no edge to liquid, Zabludowicz Collection, London, UK (2020)
- Landscapes of the South, Mendes Wood DM, New York, USA (2020)
- 100 Drawings from Now, The Drawing Center, New York, USA (2020)
- TALL BOYS & A DOUBLE ESPRESSO, a collaboration with Teresa Farrell, collectively known as Tt X AB, Emalin, London, UK (2019)
- Natura Naturans, Mendes Wood DM, New York, USA (2018)
- Hog's Curve, Halsey McKay, East Hampton, USA (2018)
- The Way Things Run (Der Lauf der Dinge) Part 1: Loose Ends Don't Tie, PS120, Berlin, Germany (2018)
- Woven, Rental Gallery, East Hampton, NY, USA (2017)
- The Sleeping Procession, Cass Sculpture Foundation, West Sussex, UK (2017)
