= Josef O'Connor =

British artist and curator (born 1990)

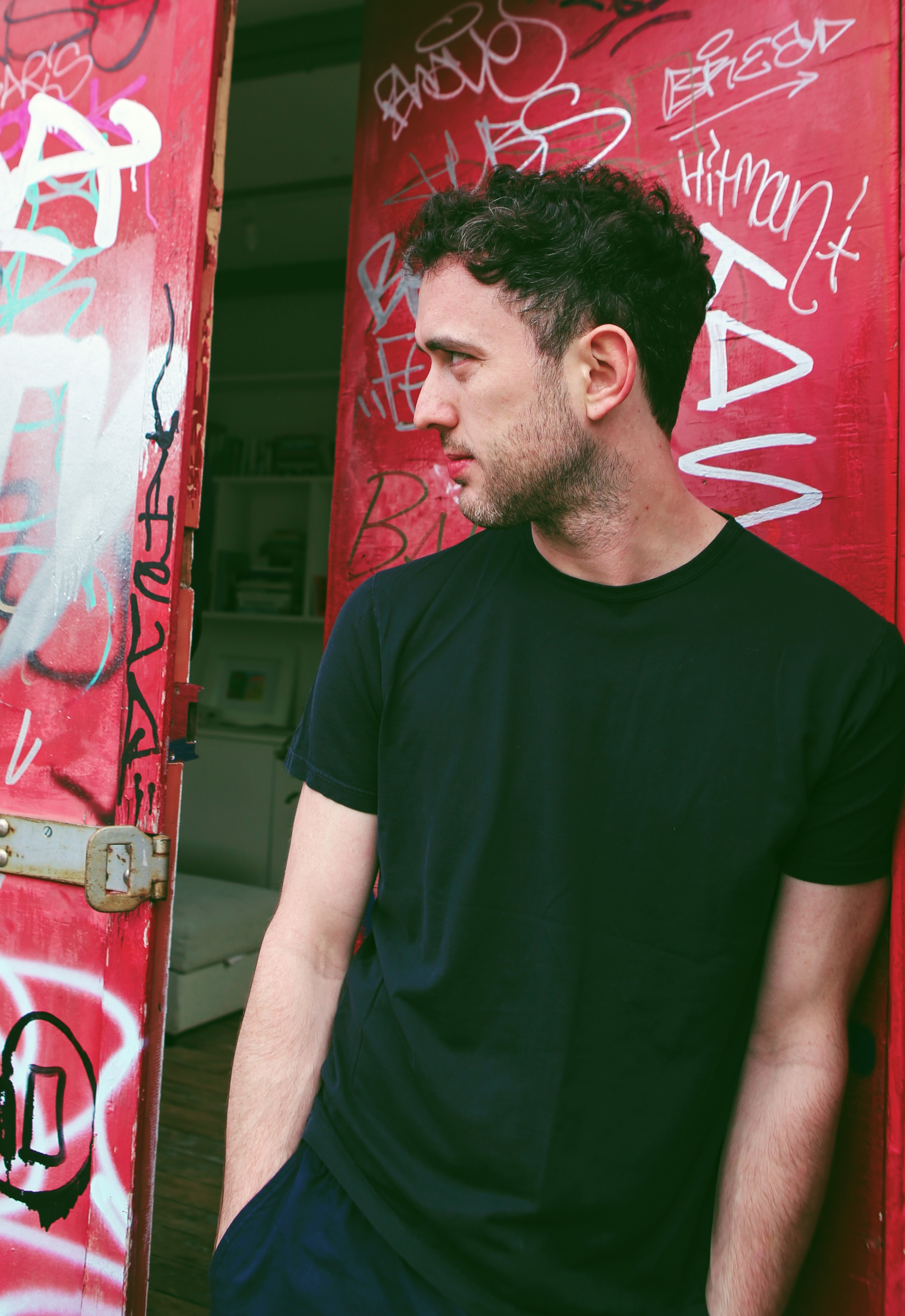
- O'Connor in 2021
- Born: Josef O’Connor; 20 January 1990 (age 36); London, England
- Known for: Artist & Curator
- Notable work: CIRCA
- Website: josefoconnor.com

Josef O'Connor (born 20 January 1990) is a British-Irish artist and curator. His multi-disciplinary works include interactive media and digital content. He is the founder and artistic director of CIRCA.

== Life and work ==
Josef O’Connor was born in 1990 in London, England. He sold his first painting at the age of 13. He was educated at Cardinal Vaughan Memorial School and Tiffin Boys School before dropping out at 18.

In 2007, O'Connor launched the digital art platform "Pollocks" in an attempt to challenge the traditional gallery model, by providing a virtual space for young creatives to upload and share their work online.

In 2008, starting with the re-appropriation of empty retail space on London's Carnaby Street, O’Connor invited members of the public to contribute to the evolution of "Blank Canvas". The performance ran for two weeks, with live musical performances from Laura Marling and Ladyhawke. Other notable contributors included Annie Lennox, Levi Palmer, Marc Quinn and photographer Rankin. Later in the year, O’Connor exhibited alongside Marlene Dumas as part of the Free Art Fair at The Barbican Centre in London.

Inspired by the 2008 financial crisis, O’Connor presented 'Worthless', a live art installation that parodied the iconic retail giant Woolworths, the public was encouraged to submit a 'worthless' item and have it transformed into a work of art. Once transformed, participants were invited to buy back the works, for the sum of money that they believed it was worth.

To celebrate the Chinese New Year of the Tiger, O’Connor was commissioned to curate a series of art installations across the UK. Developing a concept in response to the elements of the Chinese Zodiac, O'Connor brought together a program that involved site-specific sculpture, performance and musical collaborations with William Orbit and Joe Rush. The project launched with O’Connor commissioning Creatmosphere to light up Brighton's iconic West Pier with 3D mapping and laser technology. The structure was illuminated by computer-controlled laser drawings to make it appear and disappear on the horizon. The image of the illuminated pier featured on the cover of the Evening Standard and Brighton and Hove Official Calendar, 2010.

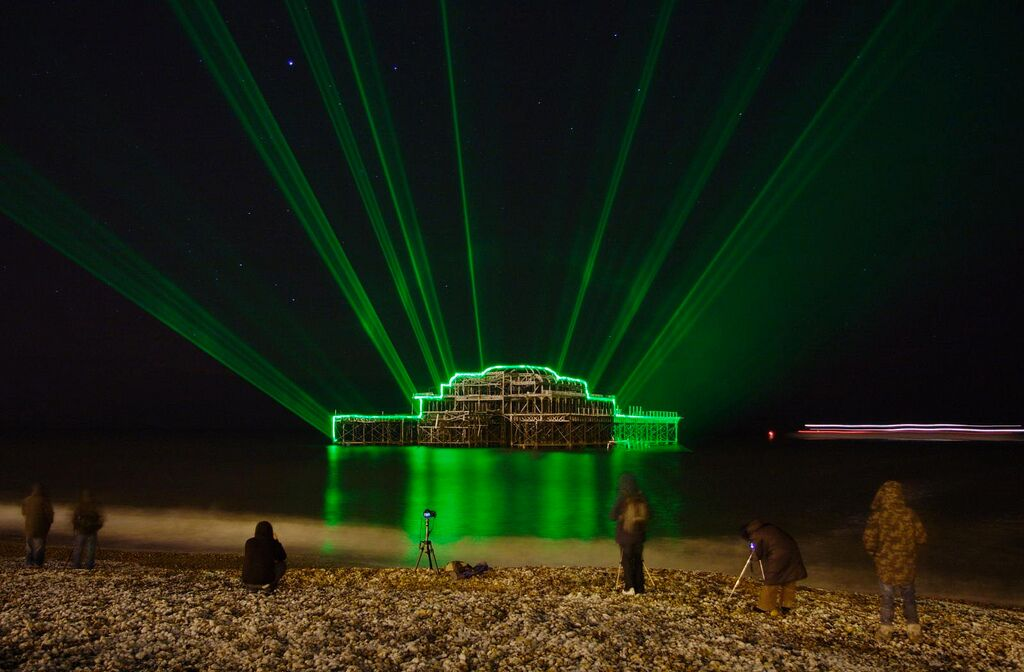
The West Pier illuminated with lasers (2010) curated by Josef O'Connor

In response to the 2010 General Election, O’Connor launched ‘Billbored’- a non-partisan viral art initiative that allowed the general public, artists and designers to submit a digital billboard artwork featuring their personal political slogans and manifestos for change. Designs were projected in a guerilla campaign onto famous London landmarks, including Big Ben, Tate Modern, St Paul's Cathedral and The Bank of England.

To commemorate Summer Solstice in 2010, O’Connor created a large-scale aerial sculpture that was architecturally constructed from over 5,000 helium balloons that were each illuminated by flashing L.E.D lights.

In 2012, O'Connor entered into the Gagosian Gallery's 'Spot Challenge'. Utilizing social media with the #AVERAGEJOE hashtag, he crowdfunded £10,000 in a week to fund a trip around the world and making a global community of 286 shareholders the unlikely winners of a Damien Hirst Spot Print. O’Connor's multidisciplinary artwork is currently being made into a film.

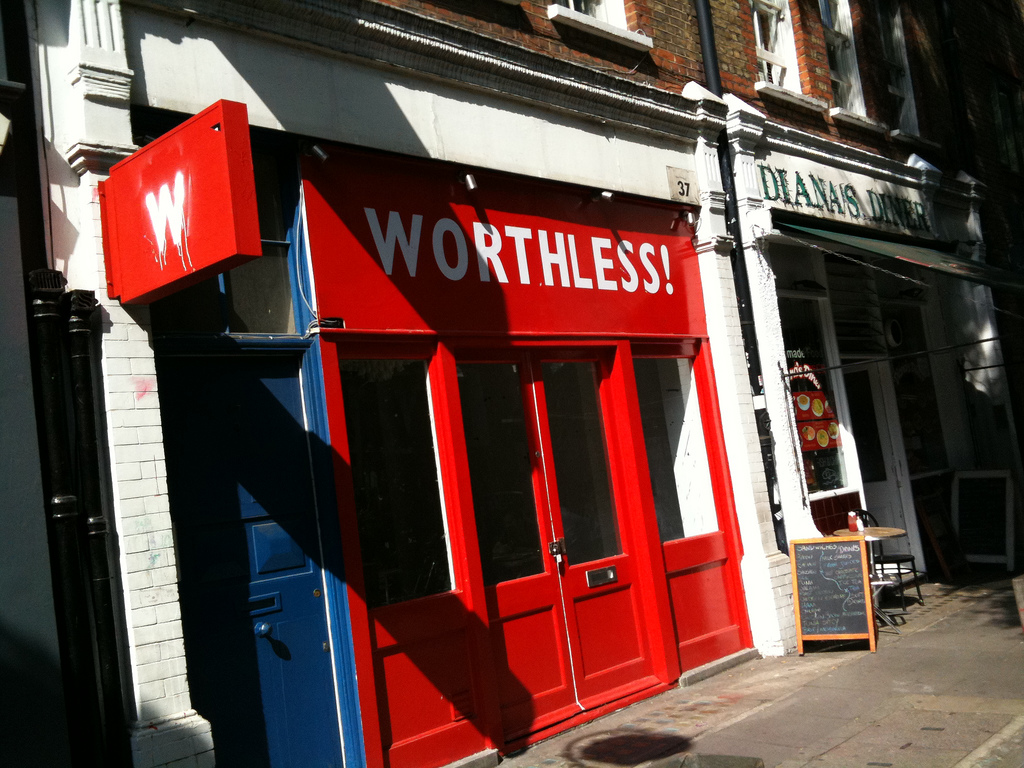
The exterior of 'Worthless' by artist Josef O'Connor (2009) in London.

== CIRCA ==
In October 2020, expanding on themes of connectivity and possibility consistent within his practice, O'Connor launched CIRCA, a platform dedicated to showcasing digital art in the public sphere on London's Piccadilly Lights screen.

Every evening at 20:20 GMT, the adverts on Europe's largest billboard were paused for two minutes to take a non-commercial break devoted to art. He described his goal with the platform in an interview with Soho House, saying "By pausing commercial adverts, we’re essentially pausing capitalism and using that time to present new and meaningful ideas to help guide us all forward."

After initially approaching the site owners, Landsec, via Twitter to propose a one-off project, O'Connor established the digital art platform as a daily incarnation on the iconic billboard screen. The first artist commissioned by Circa to present work on the screen was Ai Weiwei. The Chinese artist created a 60-minute film that played in 2-minute instalments throughout the month. On 31 October 2020, a world record was set when O'Connor arranged for Ai Weiwei's 70-minute film to be shown on the screen.

In May 2021, O'Connor commissioned British artist David Hockney to create a digital artwork titled “Remember you cannot look at the sun or death for very long,” The work was shown on a global network of outdoor screens in London's Piccadilly Circus, Times Square in New York and Pendry West Hollywood in LA, Coex K-Pop Square (the largest LED screen in Korea), and Yunika Vision in Tokyo, Japan.

== Recognition ==
In 2012, O’Connor was selected as one of the Top 25 inspiring talents from London's 1000 most influential people list, in association with Burberry and the Evening Standard.

In 2013, O’Connor was publicly voted into The Guardian's 100 most influential and innovative people working across arts, culture and the creative industries in the UK, alongside artists Jeremy Deller and Mike Nelson.
