= Forbidden London =

Coordinates: 51°30′30″N 0°8′13″W

Forbidden London (or Forbidden London Clubs) was a public relations company based at 91 Jermyn Street in the London district of St James's between 2008 and 2012 during which time it was owned by James Wilson and David West. The company promoted the nightlife sector, particularly by utilising the Internet to attract guests to events at leading nightclubs in Soho and Mayfair. Rivals at the time of the inception of Forbidden London included London Parties, operated by Nick House – future partner in Mahiki; and Met Parties.

The company was notable for staging the first performance of Vivienne Westwood's Active Resistance to Propaganda manifesto at the Bloomsbury Ballroom on Friday 4 December 2009. The performance starred Vivienne Westwood and Michelle Ryan. As the company was based above the nightclub and Russian restaurant at 91 Jermyn Street, both owned by David West, the company was named in online conspiracy theories related to the poisoning of Alexander Litvinenko. This escalated following the unlawful killing of David West although the two incidents were found to be unconnected.

In 2010 Forbidden London organised Raef Bjayou's 007 party for UK TV show Party Wars at Amika nightclub in High Street Kensington. Raef came second in the show.

In 2011 Forbidden London was nominated for Best Entertainment by Spear's for their Design for Living Awards 2011.

In August 2011 Forbidden London announced 1000 job opportunities for young people in London.

On 23 October 2017, the 60th anniversary of the Hungarian Revolution of 1956, it was announced on the Forbidden London Facebook page that the brand would relaunch.
