= Eddie Peake =

British artist

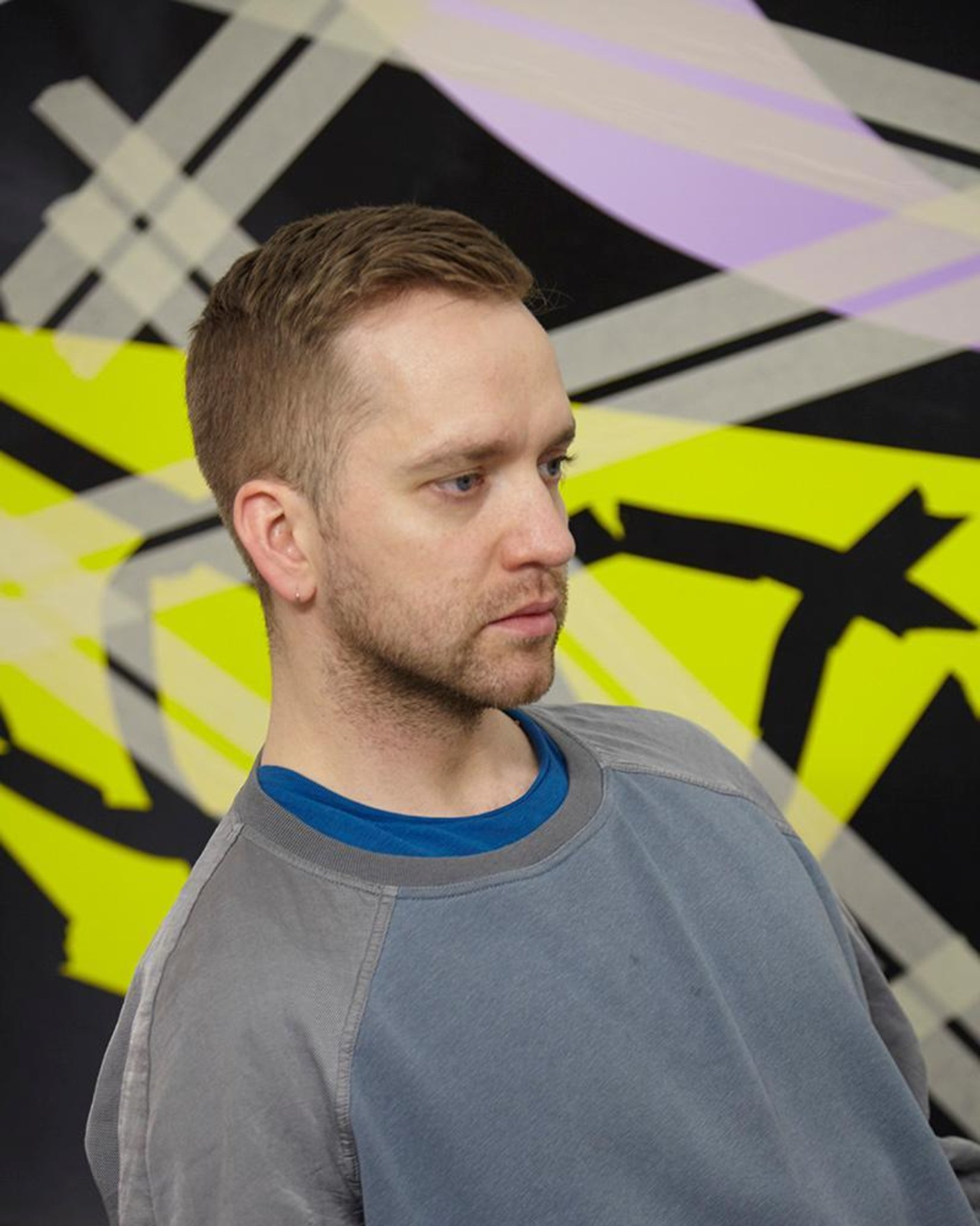
- Peake in 2017
- Born: 1981 (age 44–45); London, UK
- Education: Slade, UCL, London, 2001-2006. Bezalel, Jerusalem, (Exchange programme) 2004. Yale, Norfolk, USA, (Exchange programme) 2005. Royal Academy Schools, London, 2010-2013.
- Website: eddiepeake.com

Edward Caspar Erasmus Peake (born 1981) is a British artist. His work includes performance, video, photography, painting, sculpture and installation. His art focuses on "implicit drama within relationships between people", and "how things like desire, sexuality and depression impact on them".

== Biography ==
Peake was born in 1981 at London to artist Phyllida Barlow and poet Fabian Benedict Peake. His grandparents are writer Mervyn Peake and artist Maeve Gilmore. He has four siblings, including artist Florence Peake. He is a member of the prominent Darwin–Wedgwood family.

Peake took residency at the British School at Rome from 2008 to 2009, and graduated from the Royal Academy Schools in 2013.

== Publications ==
Peake designed the cover for A Short Affair, and a unique artwork inside the book created in response to Will Self’s new short story Civilisation.

== Exhibitions and collections ==
Selected solo exhibitions include:

- 2018 – White Cube, London
- 2015 – Barbican Art Gallery, London
- 2013 – Focal Point Gallery, Southend, UK

Selected group exhibitions include:

- 2018 – Heide Museum of Modern Art, Melbourne
- 2017 – Museum of Contemporary Art Chicago
- 2017 – Zabludowicz Collection, London
- 2016 – Eastside Projects, Birmingham, UK
- 2015 – Fondazione Memmo, Rome
- 2013 – Ujazdowski Castle Center for Contemporary Art, Warsaw
- 2012 – Museo d’Arte Contemporanea di Roma

Performance projects include:

- 2017 – Fiorucci Art Trust Volcano Extravaganza, Naples and Stromboli
- 2015 – Palais de Tokyo, Paris
- 2014 – Institute of Contemporary Arts, London
- 2013 – Performa13, New York
- 2012 – David Roberts Art Foundation, London
- 2012 – The Tanks at Tate Modern, London in conjunction with the Chisenhale Gallery, London
- 2012 – Royal Academy of Arts, London
- 2012 – Cell Project Space, London
