= Western Telegraph =

Welsh regional newspaper

- Type: Weekly newspaper
- Format: Tabloid
- Owner: Newsquest
- Editor: Clare Snowdon
- Founded: 1854
- Political alignment: Independent
- Headquarters: Western Tangiers, Fishguard Road, Haverfordwest
- Circulation: 4,240 (as of 2023)
- Sister newspapers: Milford Mercury, Tivyside Advertiser
- ISSN: 0962-659X
- Website: www.westerntelegraph.co.uk

The Western Telegraph is a Welsh regional newspaper covering Pembrokeshire and bordering Carmarthenshire. Founded in 1854 as the Haverfordwest & Milford Haven Telegraph, it is published weekly in print with an online edition. The newspaper is published by Newsquest.

== History ==
The newspaper was the highest selling weekly title in Wales, averaging 25,627 sales during the second half of 2007. Following the trend of similar titles in Wales, this figure was down 3.5% from the previous year.

The Western Telegraph marked its 150th anniversary in 2004 with a supplement highlighting some of the stories covered by the paper. The paper was given a royal seal of approval by the Queen as part of the anniversary celebrations.

In 2017, the Western Telegraph was named Best Weekly Newspaper in Wales at the Wales Media Awards, held in Cardiff.

It was also nominated in the Sports Journalist of the Year category.

In 2018, the paper was again named Best Weekly Newspaper in Wales, by the WMA's panel of judges.
