= Ridinghouse =

British book publisher

- Founded: 1995
- Founders: Karsten Schubert and Thomas Dane
- Country of origin: United Kingdom
- Headquarters location: London, UK
- Distribution: Cornerhouse and RAM
- Publication types: Books
- Official website: ridinghouse.co.uk

Ridinghouse was founded in 1995 as a British book publisher specialising in art.

== Company history ==
Ridinghouse was established by Karsten Schubert (with Charles Asprey and Thomas Dane) as a stand-alone publisher alongside its founders' gallery activities. The company publishes art writing and criticism, art history, and individual artists' work and specific projects. Since 2005, the company's list has grown and now produces from 14 to 16 publications annually.

Ridinghouse has published books in association with Whitechapel Gallery, Arnolfini, Thames & Hudson, Galerie Max Hetzler, Art Monthly, Tel Aviv Museum of Art, Haus der Kunst, Leeds Art Gallery, Kettle's Yard, The Photographers' Gallery, Musée d'Art Moderne de la Ville de Paris and the J. Paul Getty Museum.

Notable published artists include Bridget Riley, John Stezaker, Richard Deacon, Glenn Ligon, Mel Bochner, Gillian Wearing, Anya Gallaccio, Fred Wilson, Michael Landy and Alison Wilding. Selected writers include Dave Hickey, Michael Bracewell, Brian Dillon, Briony Fer, Mark Godfrey, David Campany, Dawn Adès and Penelope Curtis.

== Distributor ==
Ridinghouse's publications are distributed by Cornerhouse in the UK and Europe, and by RAM Publications + Distribution, Inc. in North America.
