= New British Sculpture =

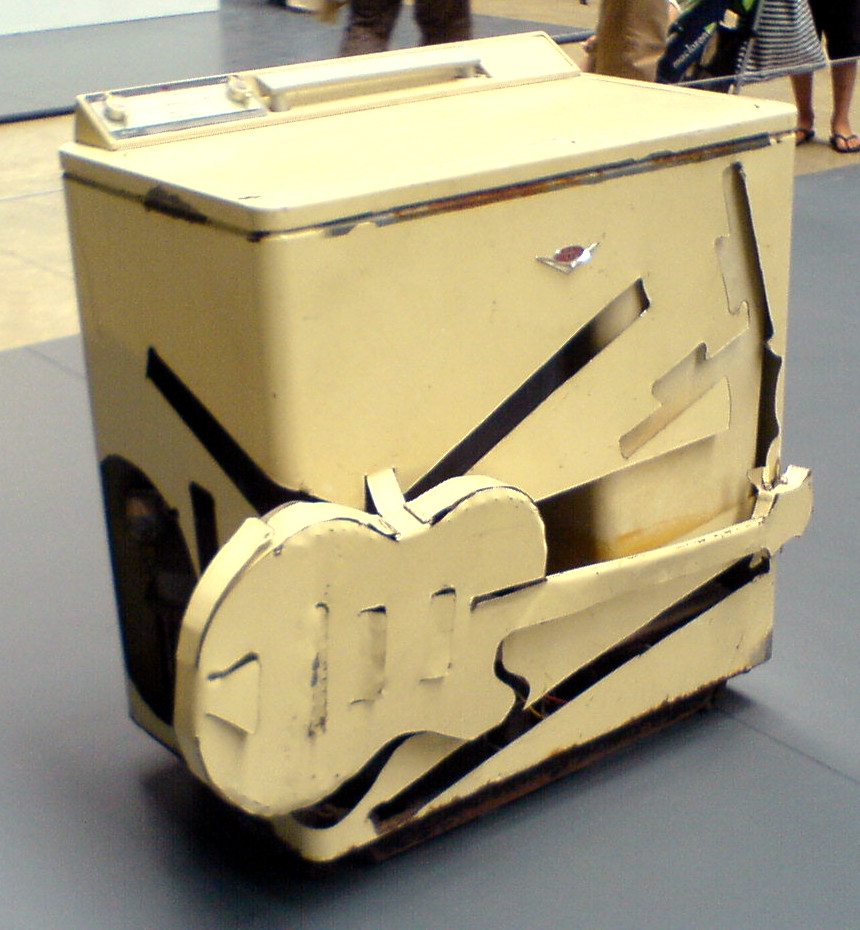
- Twin Tub With Guitar (1981) by Bill Woodrow
- Years active: early 1980s
- Location: United Kingdom
- Major figures: Stephen Cox, Tony Cragg, Barry Flanagan, Antony Gormley, Richard Deacon, Shirazeh Houshiary, Anish Kapoor, Alison Wilding, Bill Woodrow.

New British Sculpture is the name given to the work of a group of artists, sculptors and installation artists who began to exhibit together in London, England, in the early 1980s, including Tony Cragg, Richard Deacon, Shirazeh Houshiary, and Richard Wentworth.

Tim Woods has characterized the movement by identifying four major themes, "(a) a synthesis of pop and kitsch, (b) a bricolage (assemblage) of the decaying UK urban environment and the waste of consumer society, (c) an exploration of the way in which objects are assigned meanings, and (d) a play of colour, wit and humour." An early champion was art dealer Nicholas Logsdail who exhibited many of the artists at his Lisson Gallery.

== Artists ==
- Edward Allington
- Stephen Cox
- Tony Cragg
- Grenville Davey
- Richard Deacon
- Barry Flanagan
- Anthony Gormley
- Shirazeh Houshiary
- Anish Kapoor
- Julian Opie
- Boyd Webb
- Richard Wentworth
- Rachel Whiteread
- Alison Wilding
- Bill Woodrow
