= Sarah Cunningham =

Sarah Cunningham may refer to:

- Sarah Todd Cunningham (1894–1963), American politician
- Sarah Cunningham (actress) (1918–1986), American actress
- Sarah Jane Cunningham (born 1967), British-born American television writer and producer
- Sarah Cunningham (painter) (1993–2024), British painter
