= MAMCO =

Art museum in Geneva, Switzerland

Museum of Modern and Contemporary Art

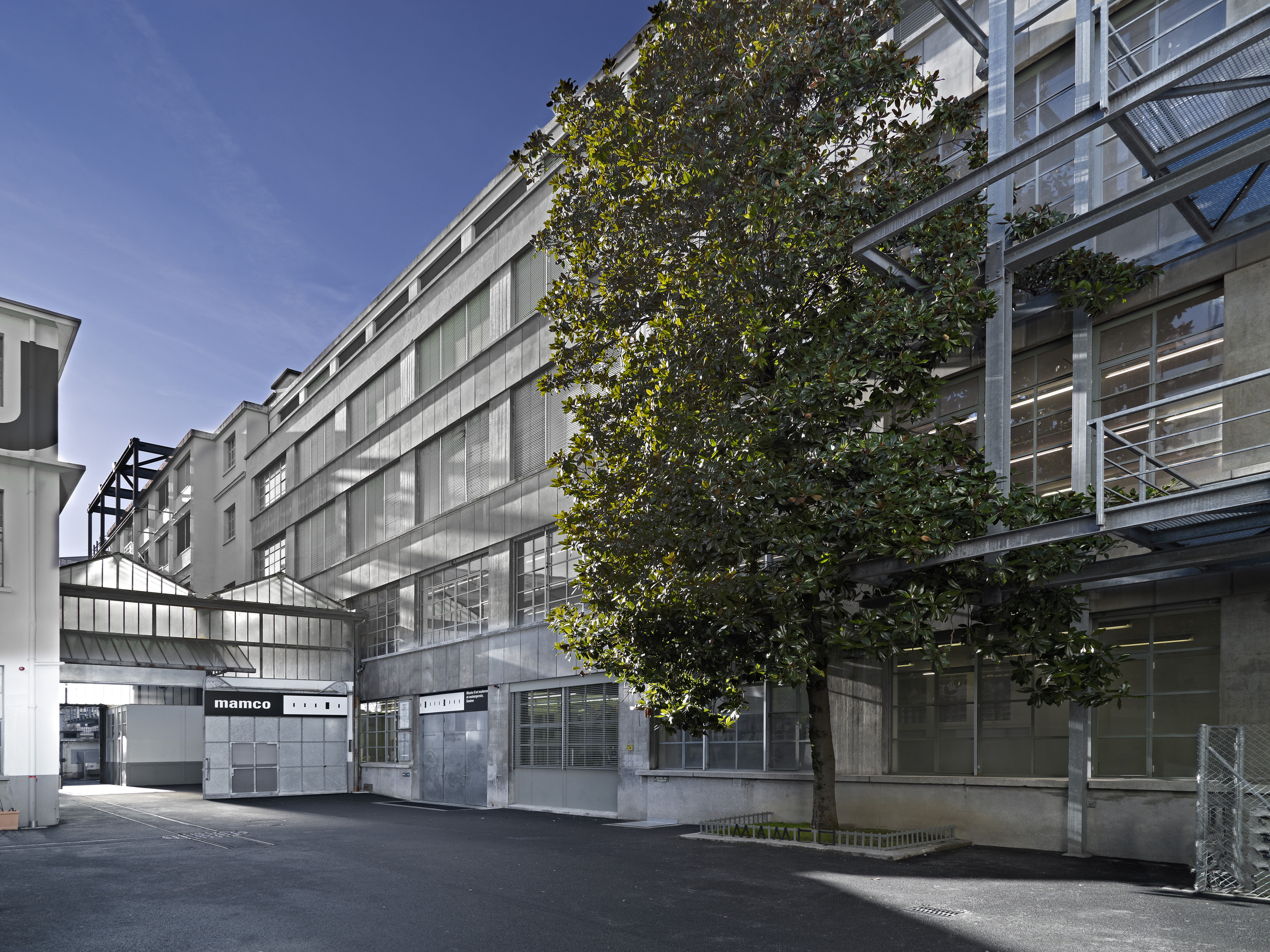
- Interactive fullscreen map
- Established: 22 September 1994; 31 years ago
- Location: Rue des Vieux-Grenadiers 10; Plainpalais, Geneva, Switzerland
- Coordinates: 46°11′56″N 6°08′15″E
- Type: Art museum
- Visitors: 58'886 (2024)
- Director: Lionel Bovier
- Public transit access: Bus: Lines 2, 19 and 35 stop Bains; line 1 stop École-Médecine; Tramway: stop Plainpalais
- Website: www.mamco.ch

The Museum of Modern and Contemporary Art (French: Musée d'art moderne et contemporain; MAMCO) is the contemporary art museum of Geneva, which opened in 1994. The building is a former factory building, with 3500 m^{2} of exhibition space, it is the largest contemporary art museum of Switzerland.

With the museum being under renovation between 2025 and 2028, MAMCO has continued its exhibition programme through off-site collaborations with partner institutions, including MAMCO x SOMA, MAMCO x Société des Arts, Dial-A-Poem Switzerland at the Bains des Pâquis, and Quickkopy Conceptualism with HEAD-Genève.

== Exhibitions ==
Since opening in 1994, MAMCO has organised over 450 temporary exhibitions, collection displays and collaborative projects focused on modern and contemporary art. Its recent programme has included thematic surveys such as Inventaire and Land Art & Earthworks, summer "special edition" group exhibitions, and solo or focused presentations devoted to artists including Olivier Mosset, Christian Marclay, Jeremy Deller, Julia Wachtel, Gordon Matta-Clark, Mierle Laderman Ukeles, General Idea, Ian Burn, Emma Reyes, Tishan Hsu, Lynn Hershman Leeson, Paul Thek, Erica Pedretti and Paul Neagu.

== Collection ==
MAMCO's collection comprises almost 6,000 works created between the second half of the 20th century and the beginning of the 21st century, with about half of the holdings available through the museum's online catalogue. The museum has particularly strong collection of works by Siah Armajani, John M Armleder, Tobias Kaspar, Guy de Cointet, Sylvie Fleury, Olivier Mosset, Steven Parrino, Philippe Thomas and Franz Erhard Walther. It also includes substantial groups of works by Louise Lawler, Christian Marclay, Maurizio Nannucci, Nam June Paik and General Idea, alongside works by Helen Frankenthaler, Gordon Matta-Clark and Frank Stella.

The collection has grown mainly through donations, bequests and targeted acquisitions rather than through a standing acquisitions budget. Since 2017, MAMCO has also expanded its holdings through its In Course of Acquisition project at artgenève, which the museum said had brought around sixty works into the collection by 2026.

== Directors ==
- Christian Bernard (1994-2015 )
- Lionel Bovier (2016-present)

== See also ==
- List of museums in Switzerland
- Plainpalais
