= Roderick Coyne =

English artist and sculptor

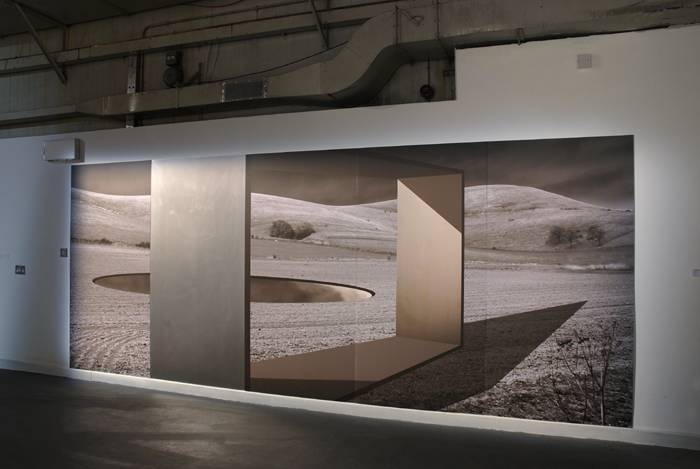
From Floor to Sky 2010 at P3 Galleries

Roderick Coyne (born 1945, in Buckinghamshire) is an English artist and sculptor.

== Education ==
Coyne studied at Folkestone School of Art (1964–66), in the sculpture departments of Saint Martin's School of Art (1966–69) and the Royal College of Art (1969–72) alongside Richard Wentworth, Alison Wilding and Ismail Saray. During his studies he showed works in a major open air sculpture show in Holland Park (1972), with contemporary artists including early generation sculptors - Brian Kneale, Bernard Meadows, Kenneth Armitage, and new generation sculptors -Tim Head, Carl Plackman, Ismail Saray. Other early 'site specific' exhibitions included Trinity College, Cambridge (1971). He is a member of the Royal College of Art Society, the association of former graduates of the Royal College of Art. He contributed a number of articles concerning art education practice.

== Teaching ==
Coyne taught on the 'A' Course of the sculpture department at Saint Martin's School of Art from 1972 to 1980. He was also a visiting lecturer at Chelsea School of Art, Ravensbourne College of Art and Design, and Newport College of Art.

== Exhibitions ==
From 1980, the site-specific sculpture of Coyne's early work developed into large-scale photographically-based installations involving a synthesis of projection and print. (BBC Billboard Project 1993, ‘A’ Gallery London 1996, Whitechapel Open 1996, Chapter Arts Cardiff 1997, Royal West of England Academy 1999.) Recent work involves the use of non-photographic materials in the construction of the picture plane. Peter Kardia, Hester Westley and Malcolm Le Grice edited an exhibition catalog published by AC Black (London).

He exhibited works in the Royal Academy Summer Exhibition, 2010.

More recent exhibitions saw a shift in his approach from installations to painted panels of works based on themes around nature and environment. In 2013 his exhibition "Crossing Fields" shown at AND eventSpace, London the first series of painted panels mixed with photographic prints were shown. This was followed in 2015 the exhibition "Aground" held at the Sassoon Gallery, Folkestone. See images from this impressive installation. In the same year at 43 Inverness Street Gallery "Overlaid Landscapes" consisting of a series of photographic and painted panels were installed on two floors of the gallery.

== Gallery ==
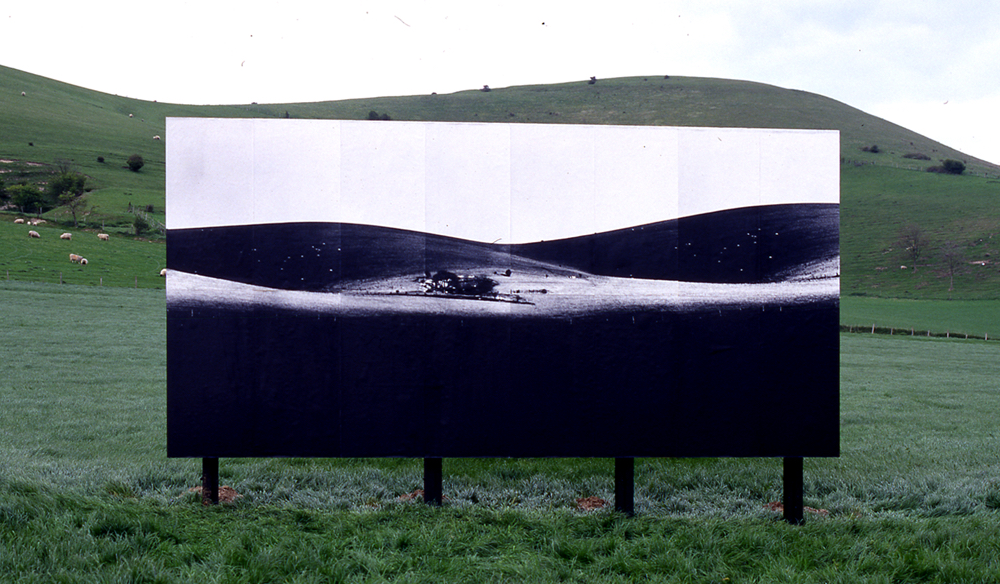
'BBC Billboard Project' - Mt Caburn, East Sussex 1993

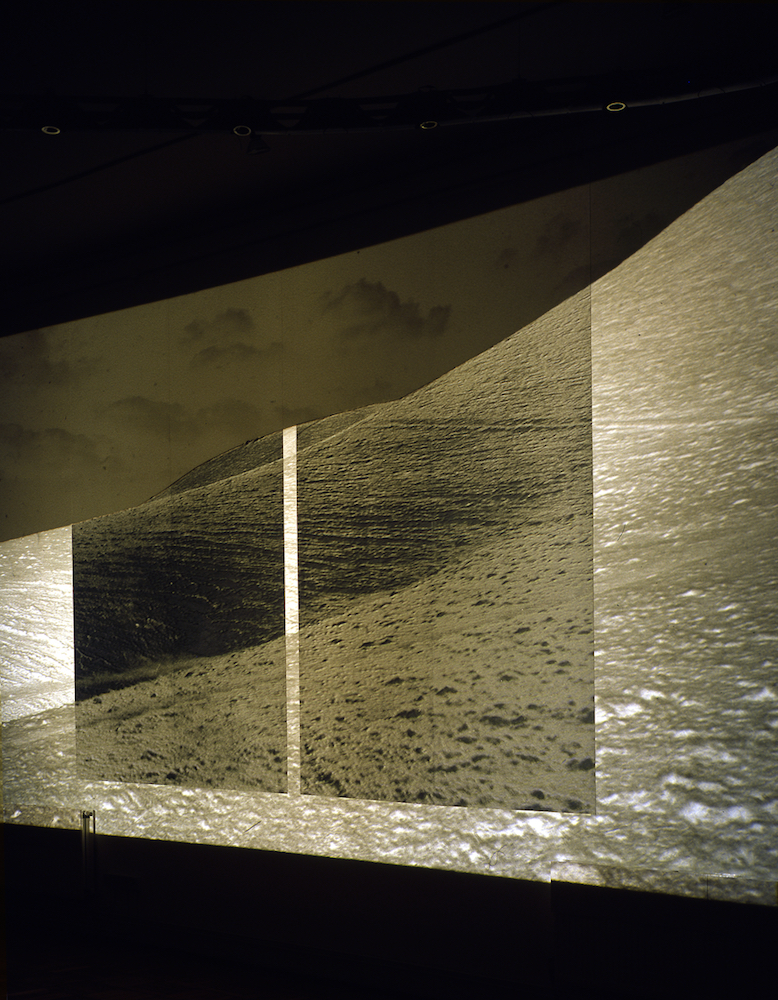
'Panelled Landscape' - A Gallery, London 1996 - Photographic negative projection over positive print - 3.6 x 5m

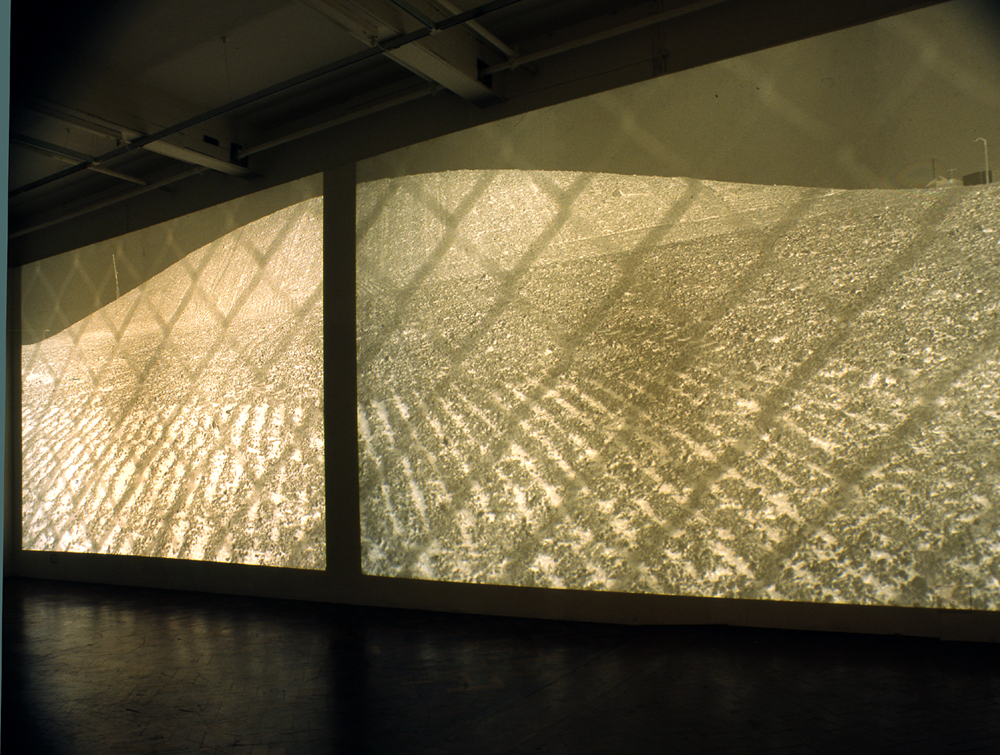
'Barrow' - Chapter Arts, Cardiff 1997 - Photographic projection - 3 x 7.3m

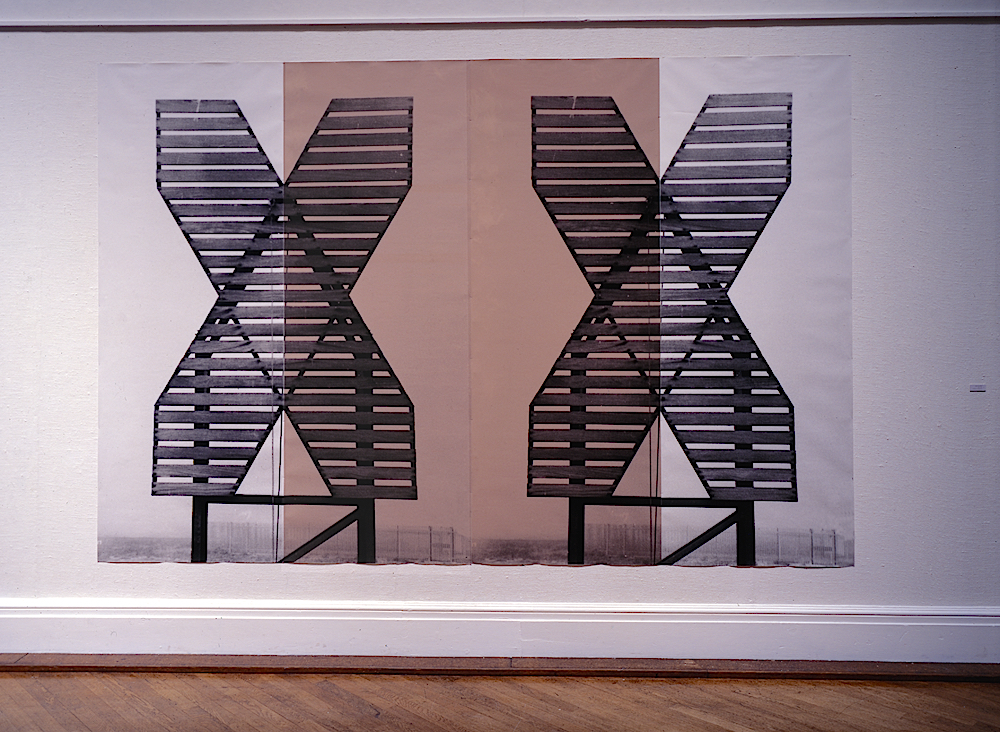
Seamark' - Royal West of England Academy. Bristol 1999 - fixed and unfixed photographic print - 2.3 x 3.5m

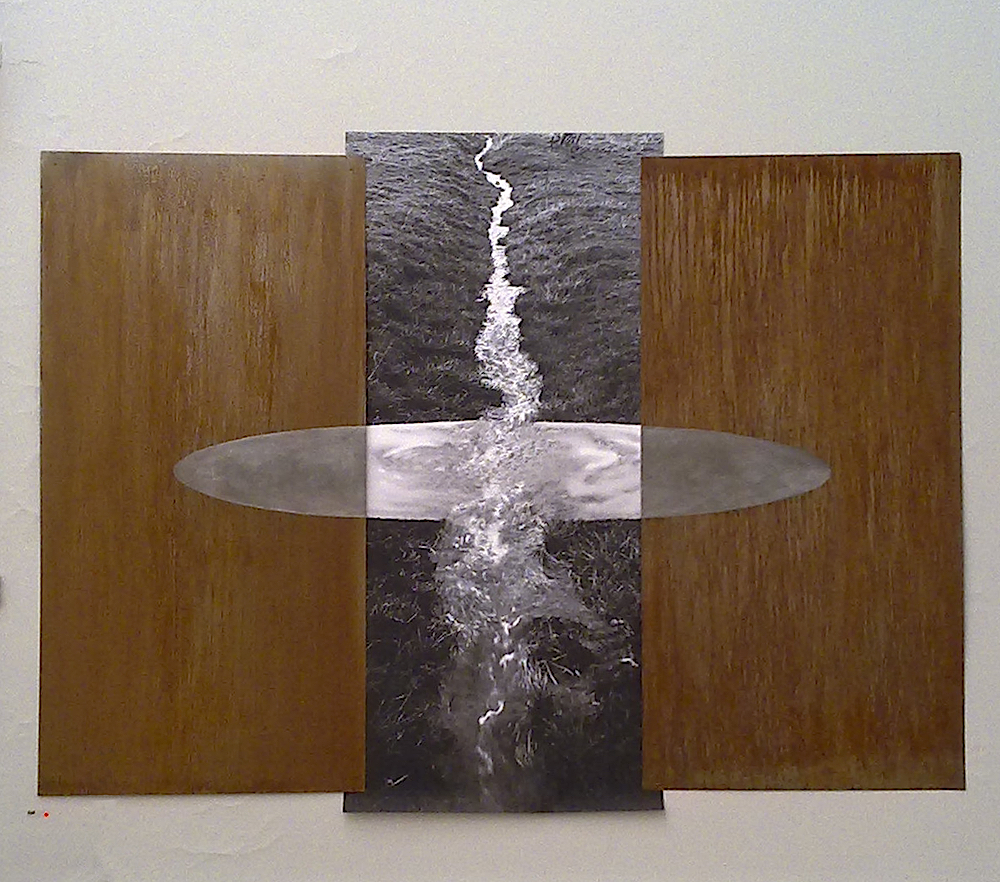
'Skein'- Royal Academy 2010- Photographic print and rusted mild steel-200 cm x 280 cm

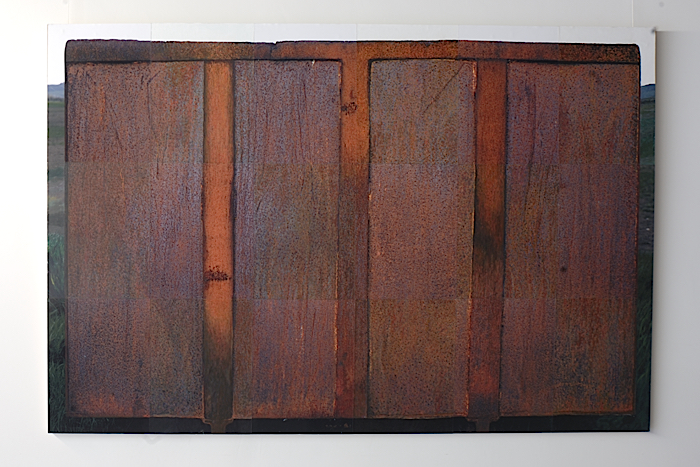
'Curtain'-AND Event Space, London 2013 - 18 alternate panels of photograph and paint-120 cm x 180 cm

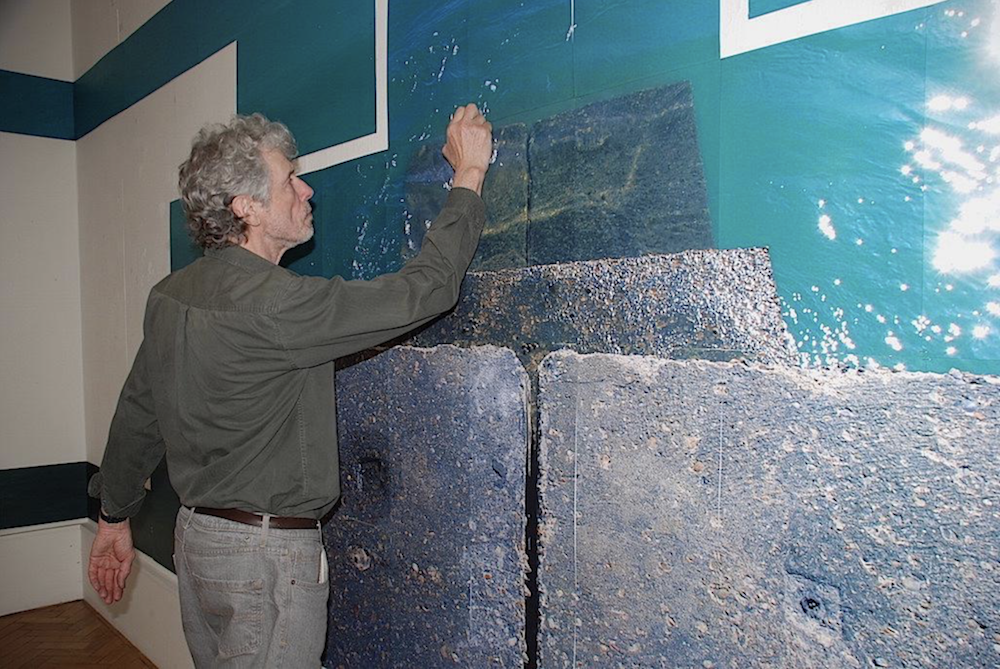
Artist preparing the installation "Aground" at the Sassoon Gallery, Folkestone, 2015
