= Bill Woodrow =

British sculptor

Bill Woodrow RA
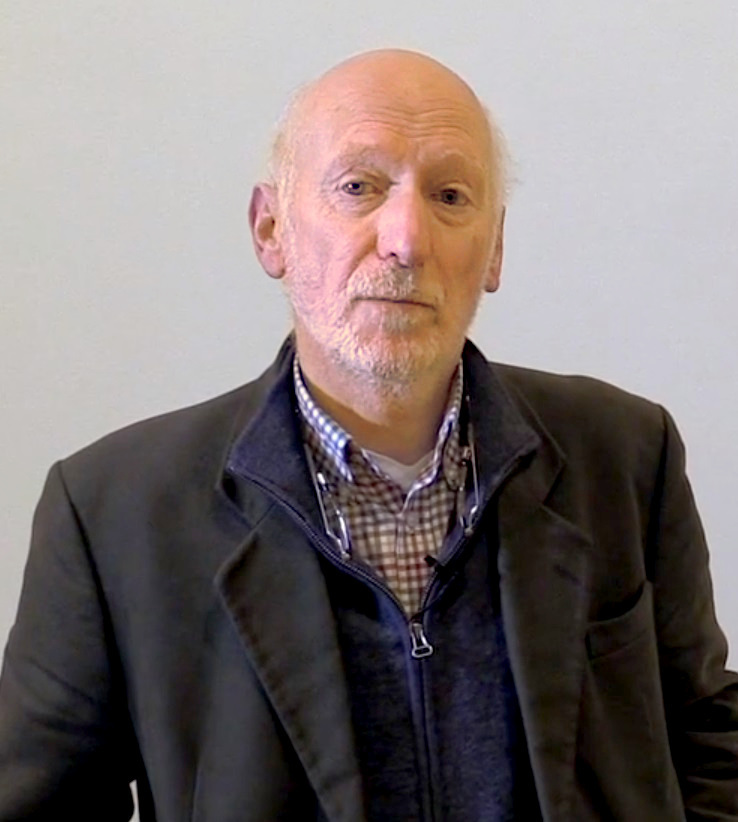
- Woodrow in 2013
- Born: 1 November 1948 (age 77) near Henley-on-Thames, Oxfordshire, England, UK
- Education: Winchester College of Art (1967–1968), Central Saint Martins College of Art and Design (1968–1971), Chelsea School of Art (1971–1972)
- Known for: Sculpture
- Movement: New British Sculpture
- Elected: Royal Academician (2002)
- Website: www.billwoodrow.com

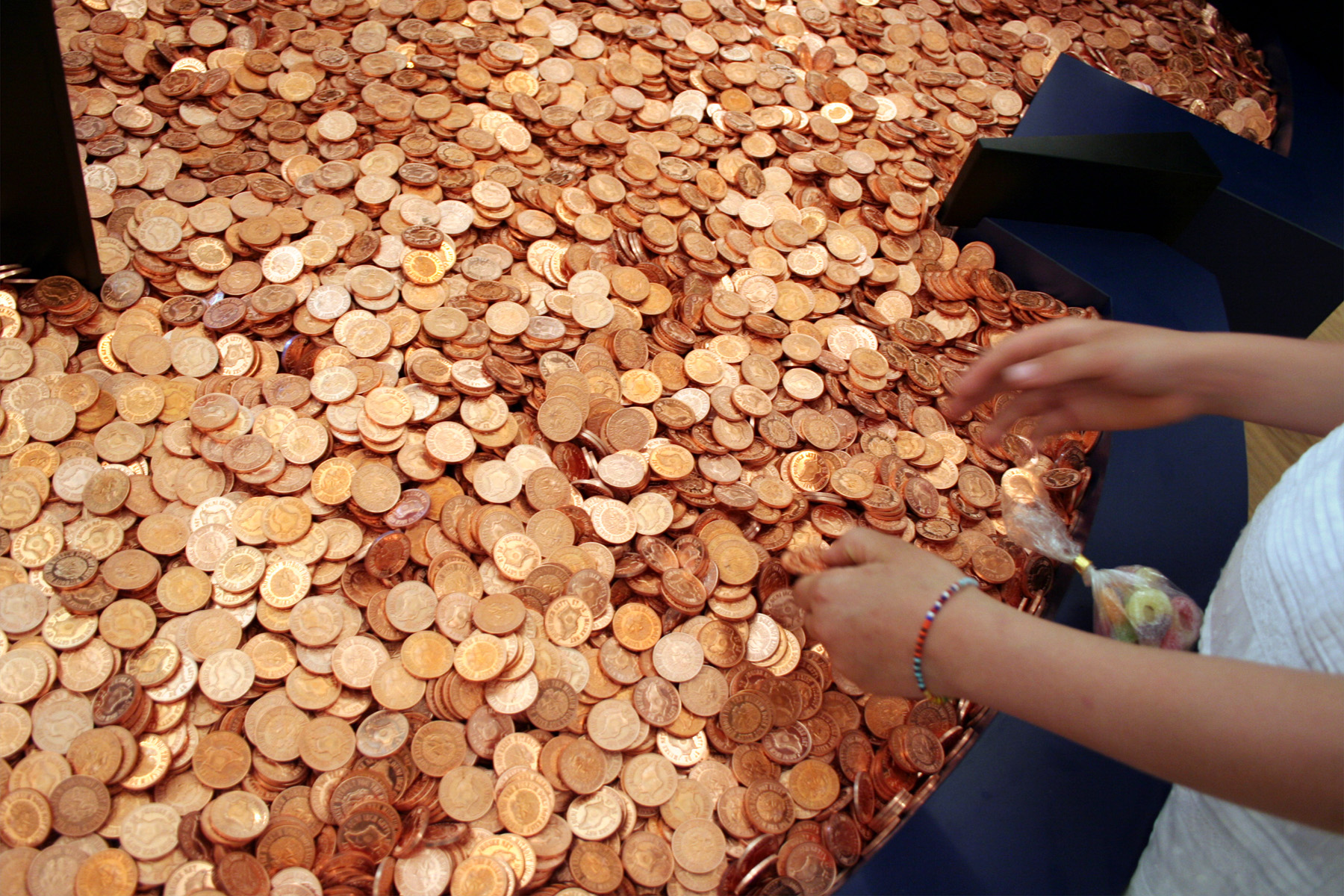
Pond (2006) by Woodrow at the Mudam (Grand Duke Jean Museum of Modern Art in Luxembourg)

Bill Woodrow (born 1 November 1948) is a British sculptor.

== Early years and education ==
Bill Woodrow was born on 1 November 1948 near Henley-on-Thames, Oxfordshire. He received his education at the Winchester College of Art (1967–1968), the Central Saint Martins College of Art and Design in London (1968–1971), and the Chelsea School of Art (1971–1972).

== Artistic career ==
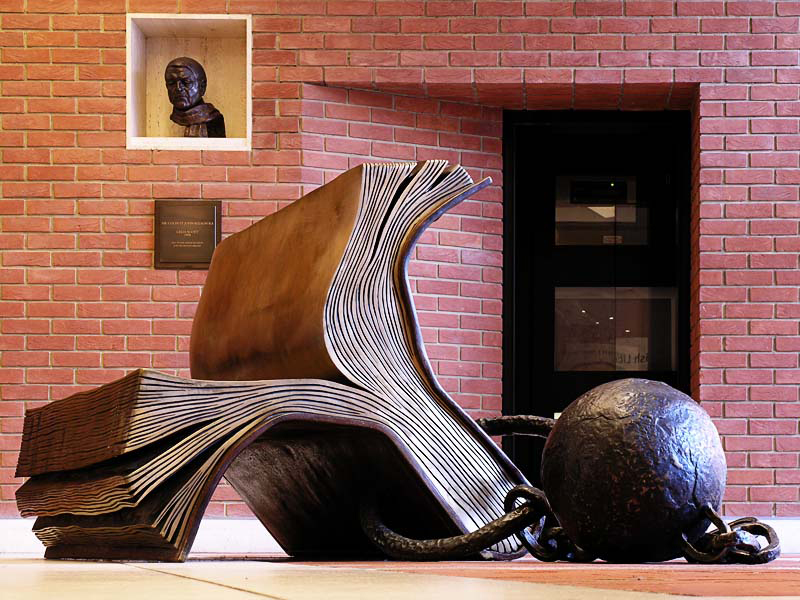
Woodrow's Sitting on History (1995) was purchased for the British Library by Carl Djerassi and Diane Middlebrook in 1997. The sculpture, with its ball and chain, refers to the book as the captor of information from which we cannot escape.

Woodrow was one of a number of British sculptors to emerge in the late 1970s on to the international contemporary art scene, together with fellow artists like Richard Deacon and Tony Cragg. Materials found in dumps, used car lots and scrap yards formed the raw materials for his early works; by partly embedding them in plaster, he made them seem as if they had been excavated. Subsequently, he turned to large consumer goods like cars and refrigerators. While their original structures could still be discerned, he cut portions out of them and reattached the portions to the main structures so that they appeared to be connected through umbilical cords. He held his first solo exhibition at Whitechapel Art Gallery in London in 1972.

Woodrow's works often featured a narrative element, and in the 1990s when he began to make work in bronze, stories remained an important element of his sculptures. A seminal work was In Awe of the Pawnbroker (1994), in which the meaning of the pawnbroker's symbol was unravelled. This sculpture has a number of elements that add up to what is virtually an installation. One of three artists selected to make a sculpture for the Fourth Plinth in Trafalgar Square, London, in 2000, Woodrow chose to explore a recurring theme in his work – the destruction of the planet and the insistent strength of nature over man – in the piece entitled Regardless of History.

== Major exhibitions ==
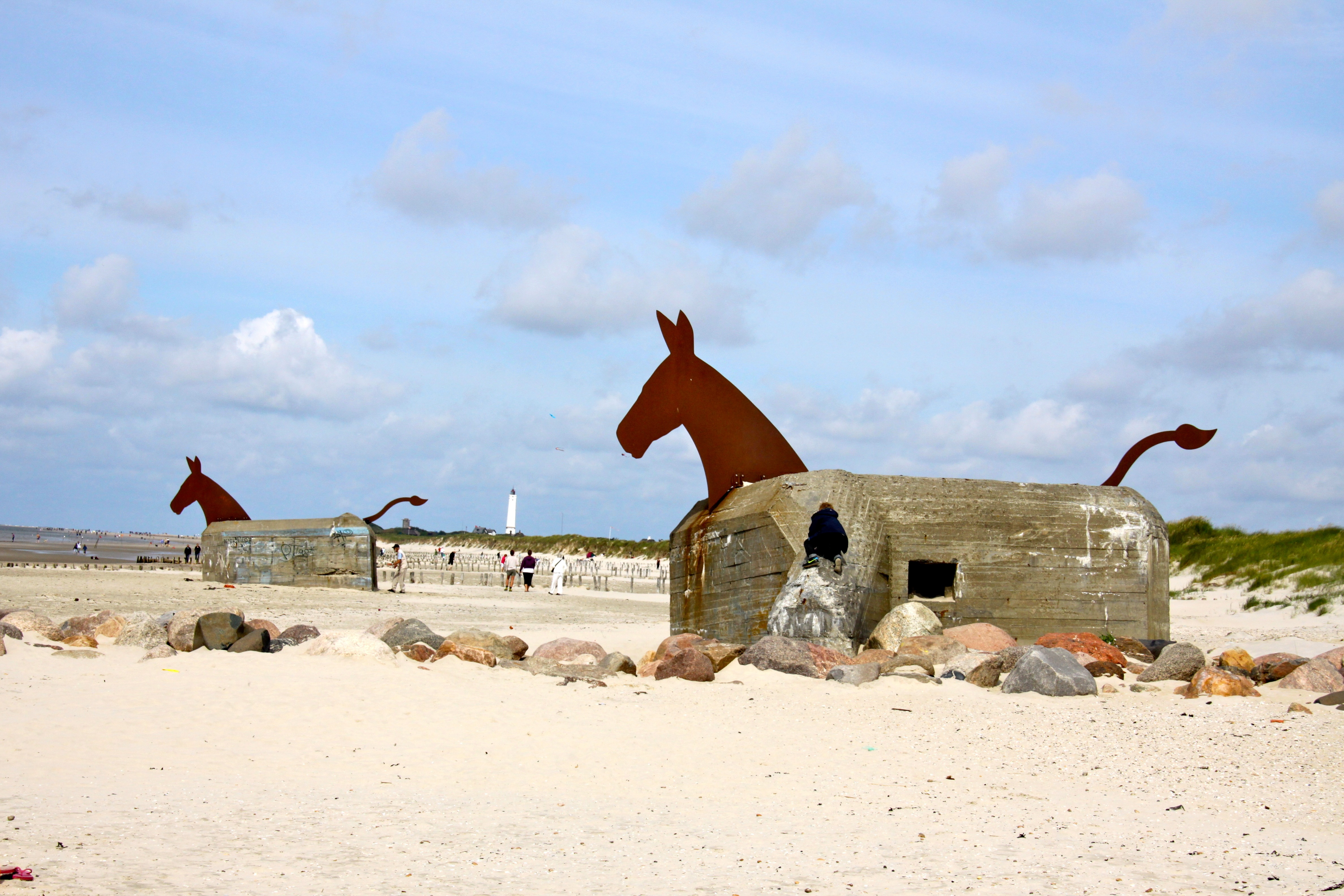
Bunker/Mule (1995) in Blåvand-Oksby, Denmark

Important solo shows by Woodrow include the XXI São Paulo Art Biennial (Brazil, 1991); Fool's Gold, an exhibition of bronze sculptures at the Tate Modern (London, UK, 1996); and Bee Keeper at the South London Gallery (2001). Several exhibitions at the Royal Academy of Arts in London have featured his works, including Earth: Art of a Changing World (2009) and Modern British Sculpture (2011). Between 30 March and 29 September 2013, Woodrow curated the exhibition Here, There and Somewhere in Between at Hatfield House in Hatfield, Hertfordshire. A joint project between the historic country house and the Royal Academy, the show included Woodrow's piece Endeavour: Cannon Dredged from the First Wreck of the Ship of Fools as well as works by Michael Craig-Martin, Richard Deacon and Gary Hume. A major retrospective of his work was held at the Royal Academy between 7 November 2013 and 16 February 2014.

== Awards and honours ==
Woodrow was a finalist for the Turner Prize in 1986, and was elected a Royal Academician in the sculpture category in May 2002.
