= Karsten Schubert =

German-born British art dealer (1961–2019

- Born: 12 August 1961; Berlin, Germany
- Died: 30 July 2019 (aged 57)
- Occupations: artists' representative, gallery proprietor and publisher
- Known for: Karsten Schubert Limited; Ridinghouse

Karsten Schubert (12 August 1961 – 30 July 2019) was a German art dealer and publisher working in London.

== Career ==
Before opening his own gallery, Schubert worked at the Lisson Gallery.

=== Karsten Schubert London ===
Schubert ran Karsten Schubert London, initially in collaboration, and with the backing of, Richard Salmon, from 1986 to 1991. His first exhibition was of the sculptor Alison Wilding, that he continued to show until his death.

His 1988 group show of Ian Davenport, Gary Hume and Michael Landy was one of the first commercial gallery shows of artists that would later come to be known as Young British Artists (YBA). The gallery quickly came to represent many of the YBA artists and several non-British artists. In addition to the exhibition programme the gallery also contributed to the publication of a series of catalogues and books which offered an overview of the YBA scene.

The gallery relocated from Charlotte Street to smaller premises in Foley Street, continuing its exhibition and publishing programme. Rachel Whiteread's 1996 departure from the gallery (to Anthony d'Offay) triggered a reorientation of Schubert's activities. He became a private artists' representative and art dealer working with a select number of artists of whose art he particularly liked, most famously Bridget Riley.

In 2007, the company moved to premises on Golden Square in Soho then, in January 2014 moved to Lexington Street, Soho. That same year, Schubert co-organised an exhibition of Bridget Riley's work at David Zwirner Gallery in London.

=== Other ===
Schubert was a trustee of Space, London. He was also a faculty member of the Fine Arts programme, for 2015–2016, at the British School at Rome.

== Personal life ==
In 2015, Schubert was diagnosed with medullary thyroid cancer. In July 2019, he died aged 57 from the disease.

== Bibliography ==
- Technique Anglaise: Current Trends in British Art. Karsten Schubert; Thames and Hudson, 1989.
- The Curator's Egg. London: Ridinghouse, 2000.
- About Carl Andre. London: Ridinghouse, 2008. Edited by Paula Feldman, Alistair Rider, Karsten Schubert.
- Robert Ryman: Critical Texts Since 1967. London: Ridinghouse, 2009. Edited by Vittorio Colaizzi and Karsten Schubert.
- Bridget Riley: Complete Prints. London: Ridinghouse, 2012. Edited by Karsten Schubert.
- Room 225–6. London: Ridinghouse, 2015. His first novel, set in London.
