= Richard Wentworth (artist) =

British artist, curator and teacher (born 1947)

- Education: Hornsey College of Art and Royal College of Art
- Known for: Sculpture, Photography
- Movement: New British Sculpture
- Website: www.lissongallery.com/artists/richard-wentworth

Richard Wentworth CBE (born 1947) is a British artist, curator and teacher.

== Life and career ==
Wentworth was born in Samoa—then a province of New Zealand—in 1947. He studied art at Hornsey College of Art in North London from 1965, then at the Royal College of Art, where he was a contemporary of Zoë Wanamaker and Tony Scott.

Between 1971 and 1987, Wentworth taught at Goldsmiths College, and his influence is claimed in the work of the Young British Artists. From 2002 to 2010, Wentworth was 'Master of Drawing' at the Ruskin School of Drawing and Fine Art, Oxford University, and from 2009 to 2011, he was the head of the Sculpture department at The Royal College of Art, London.

In August 2014, Wentworth was one of 200 public figures who signed a letter to The Guardian opposing Scottish independence in the run-up to September's referendum on that issue.

=== Making Do and Getting By ===
Since the early 1970s, Wentworth has been capturing chance encounters of oddities and discrepancies in the modern landscape in the ongoing photographic series Making Do and Getting By. Mundane snapshots and fragments of the modern landscape are elevated to an analysis of human resourcefulness and improvisation, whereby amusing oddities that would otherwise go unnoticed become the subject of intense contemplation.

=== New British Sculpture ===
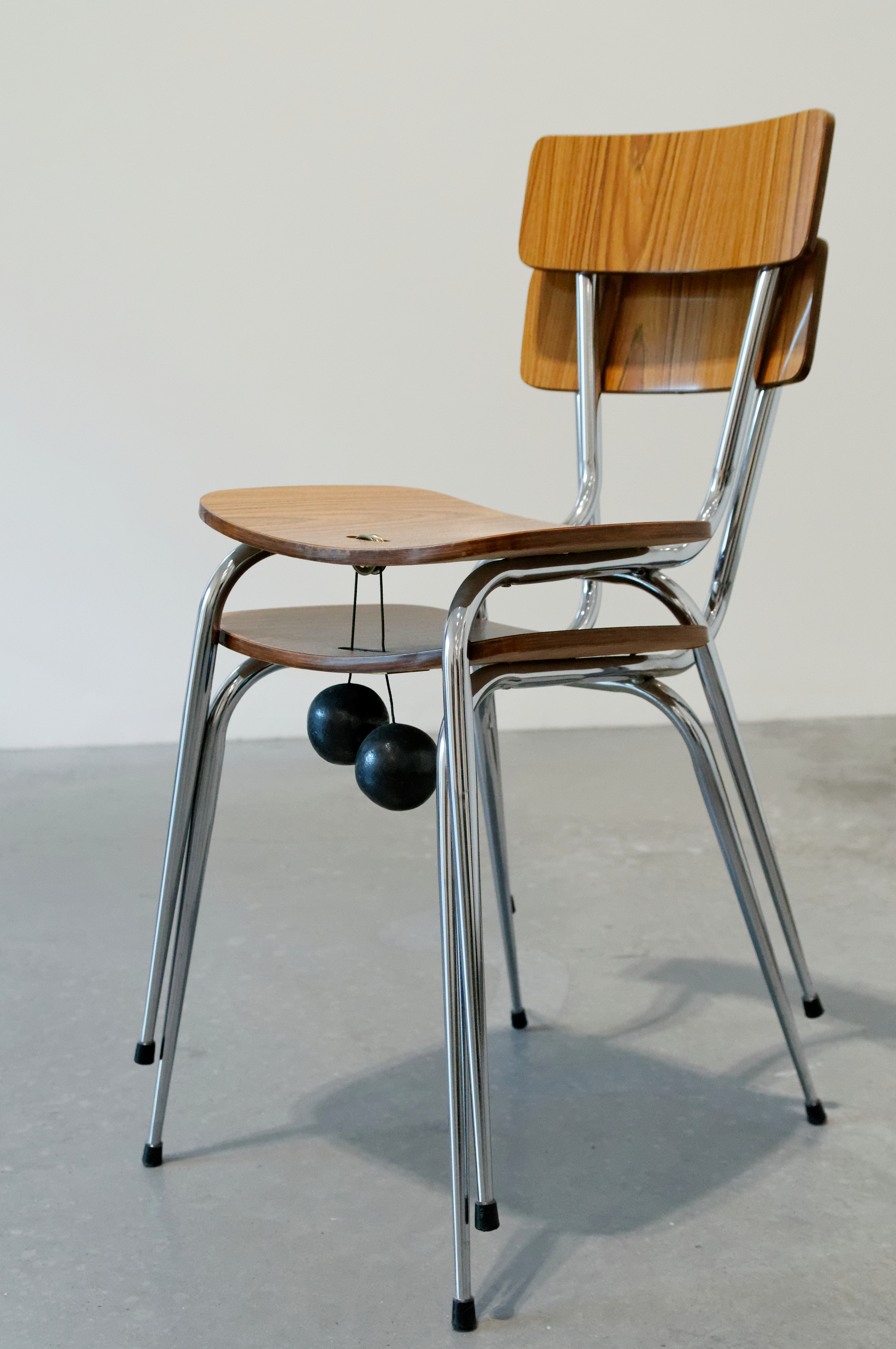
Siege, 1983–1984, Tate Modern

In the early 1980s, Wentworth became identified with the New British Sculpture movement. Wentworth's interest is the juxtaposition of materials and found elements that do not belong together. In the work Shower, Wentworth attached a small propeller to an ordinary table, creating the impression that the furniture is about to take flight. For his 1995 solo show at the Lisson Gallery, he created False Ceiling, a flock of books suspended by wire from the gallery's ceiling. For Art and Sacred Places in Winchester Cathedral, he created Recall, which speculated how the structure of the Cathedral might have been supported during its construction. Wentworth is also interested in the coincidences of urban life. His ongoing series of photographs, Making Do and Getting By (1974 onwards), captures the ways in which people modify their local environment. In April 2010, Wentworth participated in a sculpture exhibition curated by Peter Kardia entitled "From Floor to Sky," alongside artists Roderick Coyne and Alison Wilding.

== Exhibitions ==
Wentworth has lived for a number of years in the Kings Cross area of London. In 2002, he realised the Artangel project An Area of Outstanding Unnatural Beauty, in which he took over a plumbing supply shop in the area for three months, converting it into a base for visitors to explore and engage with the area.

In 1996, his Marking the Parish Boundaries along the River Tees in County Durham was the first public art project funded by the National Lottery.

Major solo presentations include upcoming major exhibition of new works at Far Far Gallery, UK (September 2026),Galerie Azzedine Alaïa, Paris, France (2017), Bold Tendencies, Peckham, London, UK (2015), Black Maria with Gruppe, Kings Cross, London, UK (2013), Whitechapel Gallery, London, UK (2010), 52nd Venice Biennale, Venice, Italy (2009), TATE, Liverpool, UK (2005), Artangel, London, UK (2002), Bonner Kunstverein, Bonn, Germany (1998), Stedelijk Museum, Amsterdam, the Netherlands (1994), Serpentine Gallery, London, UK (1993).

== Curatorial projects ==
In July 2009, he curated the Lisson Gallery's Summer show, oule to Braid, featuring a large number of works from his personal collection and that of Lisson director Nicholas Logsdail.

In 2000, together with Fischli & Weiss and Gabriel Orozco, he worked in "Aprendiendo menos" (Learning Less), curated by Patricia Martín and presented in Centro de la Imagen, Mexico City. Three different perspectives through photography, where the artists are a means to portray street findings within the urban landscape, its surroundings and its objects.

In 1998 - 99, he curated Thinking Aloud, a national Touring exhibition organised by the Hayward Gallery at Kettle's Yard, Cambridge and Camden Arts Centre, London, that explored the creative process and the profligate nature of mass production and consumerism.

== Honours ==
Wentworth was appointed Commander of the Order of the British Empire (CBE) in the 2011 New Year Honours for services to art.
