= Lisson Gallery =

Contemporary art gallery

Coordinates: 51.5208807°N 0.1691616°W

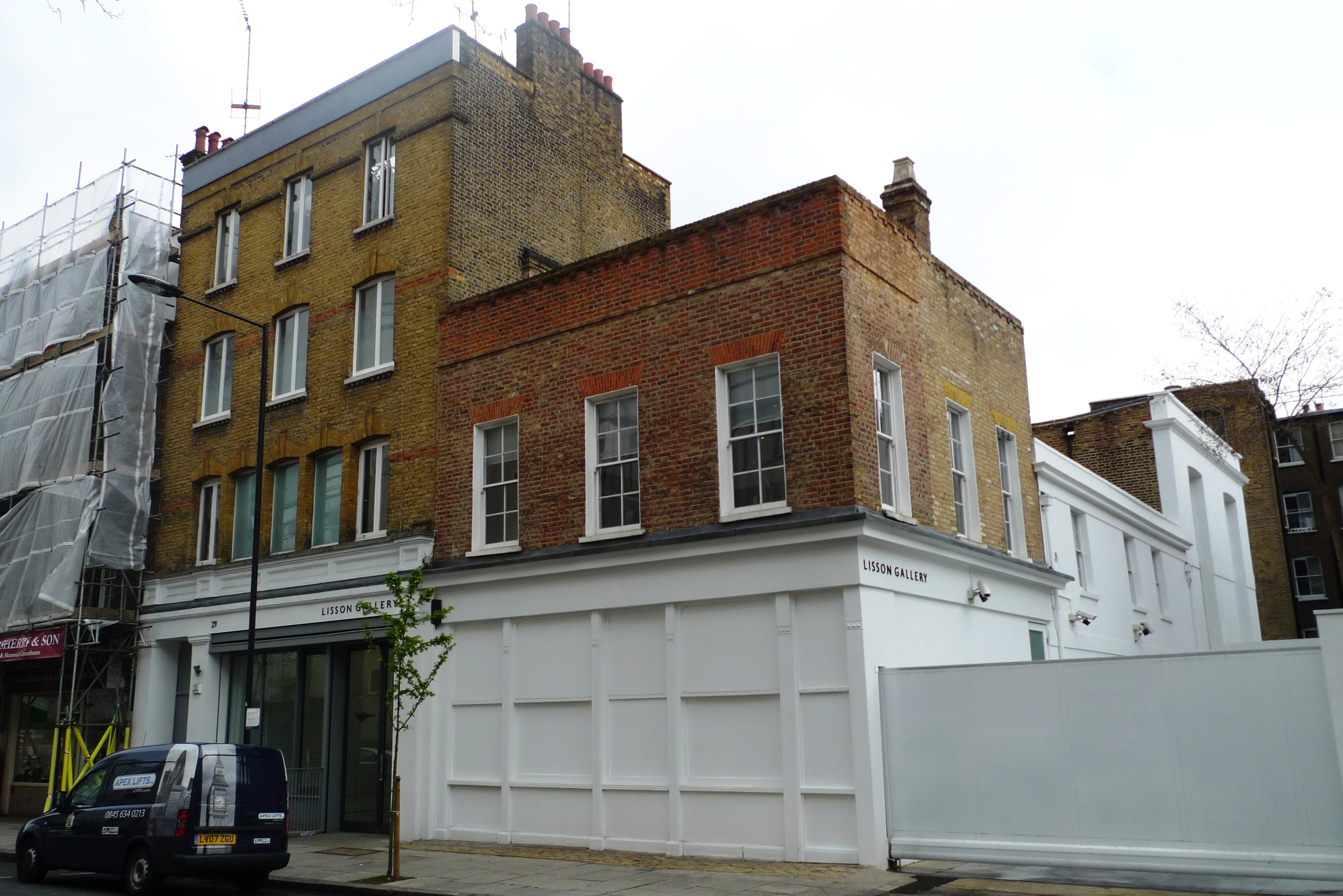
The Lisson Gallery

Lisson Gallery is one of the longest-running international contemporary art galleries in the world, with locations in London, New York, Los Angeles, and Shanghai. The gallery was founded by Nicholas Logsdail in 1967 on Bell Street in Lisson Grove, London.

The gallery represents nearly 80 global artists, including Marina Abramović, Rodney Graham, Yu Hong, Anish Kapoor, Julian Opie, Laure Prouvost, and Ai Weiwei. Fourteen Lisson Gallery artists have been nominated for the Turner Prize, five of whom—Richard Deacon, Anish Kapoor, Tony Cragg, Grenville Davey and Douglas Gordon—have won.

== History and prominence ==
Lisson Gallery's first exhibition, held in April 1967, was a group show of five young artists, including Derek Jarman and Keith Milow. The gallery soon became one of a small number of pioneering galleries in the UK, Europe and the United States to champion artists associated with Minimalism and Conceptual Art.

Within the gallery's first five years, it showed Carl Andre, Sol LeWitt, Donald Judd, Robert Ryman, Dan Graham, Mira Schendel, Lygia Clark, and Yoko Ono. In the 1980s, Lisson exhibited many of the artists who became known as the New British Sculptors, including Anish Kapoor and Richard Deacon.

Lisson Gallery's 15,000 sq ft (1,400 m^{2}) London spaces were designed by Tony Fretton in 1986 and 1992. The founder's son, Alex Logsdail, joined the gallery in 2009 and took charge of its US expansion. A purpose-built 8,500 sq ft (790 m^{2}) space beneath the High Line in New York, designed by StudioMDA and Studio Christian Wassmann, was opened in 2016.

An exhibition by Carmen Herrera inaugurated the New York space (May–June 2016). By 2020, the gallery had expanded into the 5,000 sq ft (460 m^{2}) space adjacent to its first New York location.

In 2017, Lisson Gallery celebrated its 50th anniversary with the launch of a major publication featuring its exhibition history. In 2019, Lisson expanded into Asia, with the opening of a permanent space in Shanghai. Permanent spaces in Beijing and Los Angeles followed in 2021. From 2011 until 2017, the gallery operated a branch in Milan, Italy. Lisson opened temporary spaces in East Hampton andon London's Cork Street in 2020, followed by one in the Tianjin Free-Trade Zone in China in 2021.

== Artists ==
Among others, Lisson Gallery has been representing the following living artists:

- Marina Abramović
- Ai Weiwei
- Kelly Akashi (since 2023)
- John Akomfrah
- Allora & Calzadilla
- Olga de Amaral
- Art & Language
- Cory Arcangel
- Dana Awartani
- Tony Bechara
- Garrett Bradley
- Daniel Buren
- Gerard Byrne (artist, born 1969)
- Estate of Antonio Calderara
- Elaine Cameron-Weir
- Estate of Roy Colmer
- Tony Cragg
- Sarah Cunningham (painter)
- Dexter Dalwood
- Richard Deacon (sculptor)
- Ding Yi (artist)
- Nathalie Djurberg and Hans Berg
- Spencer Finch
- Ceal Floyer
- Ryan Gander
- Dan Graham
- Rodney Graham
- Van Hanos
- Hugh Hayden
- Carmen Herrera
- Estate of Susan Hiller
- Estate of Channa Horwitz
- Dom Sylvester Houedard
- Shirazeh Houshiary
- Tishan Hsu
- Leiko Ikemura
- Oliver Lee Jackson
- Christian Jankowski
- Estate of Peter Joseph
- Anish Kapoor
- Josh Kline (artist)
- Estate of John Latham (artist)
- Christopher Le Brun
- Lee Ufan
- Sol LeWitt
- Li Ran
- Liu Xiaodong
- Richard Long (artist)
- Robert Mangold
- Jason Martin (artist)
- Haroon Mirza
- Tatsuo Miyajima
- Jonathan Monk
- Otobong Nkanga
- Estate of Hélio Oiticica
- Julian Opie
- Tony Oursler
- Giulio Paolini
- Dalton Paula
- Joyce Pensato
- Jack Pierson
- Bernard Piffaretti
- Joanna Pousette-Dart
- Laure Prouvost
- Lucy Raven
- Pedro Reyes
- Fred Sandback
- Carolee Schneemann Foundation
- Sean Scully
- Wael Shawky
- Leon Polk Smith Foundation
- Hiroshi Sugimoto
- Cheyney Thompson
- Estate of Tunga (artist)
- Lawrence Weiner
- Richard Wentworth (artist)
- Masaomi Yasunaga
- Yu Hong
- Zhao Gang
