= Ann Dancing =

Sculpture created by the artist known as Julian Opie

Coordinates: 39°46′21″N 86°9′7″W

- Artist: Julian Opie
- Year: 2007
- Type: LED sculpture; Four light emitting display panels (LEDs); paint, aluminum, glass, and lights.
- Dimensions: 189 cm × 86 cm × 86 cm (74.5 in × 34 in × 34 in); dimensions omit the base
- Location: Indianapolis Cultural Trail, Indianapolis, Indiana

Ann Dancing is an artwork created in 2007 by Julian Opie (born 1958, London) an English artist and former trustee of the Tate. The electronic sculpture is located in Indianapolis, Indiana. It was removed from its base on August 20, 2008, for repairs, and was returned on October 31 of that year.

== Description ==
The sculpture consists of four rectilinear panels of light-emitting diode (LED) screens that each display the same animated image in orange of a woman on all four panels. The woman, "Ann," is wearing a sheath dress and sways from side to side in a dancing motion. Ann either has pointed feet or is wearing high-heeled shoes. She appears to have no clear hairstyle.

== History and location ==
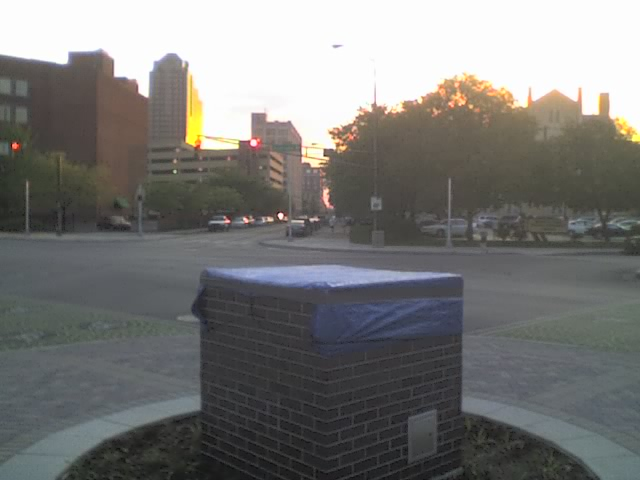
The artwork was removed from its podium in August 2008 for repairs.

The sculpture was installed at the intersection of Massachusetts Avenue, Alabama Street, and Vermont Street in Indianapolis from January to February, 2008. The sculpture is located directly in front of the Tavern at the Point (formerly Old Point Tavern) and was the first artwork installed on the Indianapolis Cultural Trail at a total expense of $150,000.

The sculpture is visible in the Google Maps Street View, but only from the middle of the intersection

I am really happy that ‘Ann Dancing’ will be in Indianapolis and become part of the street fabric. As I sit in my studio in London I think of her endlessly dancing for the passing traffic."

—Julian Opie, 2008.
