= John Stezaker =

British conceptual artist

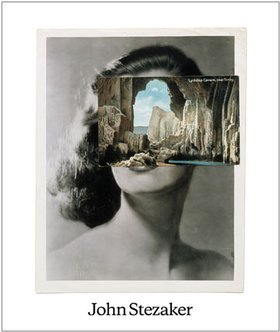
- Stezaker, Whitechapel Gallery monograph, 2011 (featuring XXXV, 2007)
- Born: 1949 (age 76–77); Worcester, England
- Education: Slade School of Art (London)
- Known for: Conceptual art

John Grenville Stezaker (/ˈstɛzəkər/ STEZ-ə-kər; born 1949) is a British conceptual artist.

== Early life and education ==
Stezaker was born in Worcester and started to collect images from a young age. He had considered becoming a policeman because the uniforms were his favourite colour - light blue. He says that he hated school.

Stezaker attended the Slade School of Art in London in his early teens, he graduated with a Higher Diploma in Fine Art in 1973. After the first year, he gave up painting for film. He says he was "completely antisocial" whilst there and wanted to just stay in his studio.

== Work and Career ==
Originally, Stezaker said that he wanted to create a "cubism of photography".

In the early 1970s, he was among the first wave of British conceptual artists to react against what was then the predominance of Pop art. Colin ell wrote in The Daily Telegraph in 2007 that Stezaker "is now being hailed as a major influence on the Young British Art movement," in reference to Young British Artists.

Recognition and solo exhibitions were rare for Stezaker for sometime. However, in the mid-2000s, his work was rediscovered by the art market and he is now collected by several international collectors and museums. Charles Saatchi was one of his early collectors in the mid-2000s. In 2012, to the dislike of many photographers, Stezaker won the Deutsche Börse Photography Prize.

His work is surreal in tone and is often made using collage and the appropriation of pre-existing images such as postcards, film stills, and publicity photographs. Art historian Julian Stallabrass said that "The contrast at the heart of these works [by Stezaker] is not between represented and real, but between the unknowing primitives of popular culture, and the conscious, ironic artist and viewer of post-modern images." One work included in an exhibition at Salama-Caro Gallery, London, in 1991, depicted an image of a punch clock together with the caption "Why Spend Time on an Exhibition Like This?"

Stezaker stated that "My ideal is to do very little to the images, maybe just one cut: the smallest change or the most minimal mutilation. What I do is destructive, but also an act of deliberate passivity."

In his series Masks he positioned Victorian-era postcards over the top of film-stars from the 1940s and 50s. Tim Jonze, of The Guardian, states that "Masks typically hide our faces, but these reveal something deeply unsettling. About what, exactly, Stezaker is still unsure."

Some of Stezaker's work is about combining male and female forms and transgender. For example, in his series Marriage, he combines the faces of male and female film stars. Stezaker traces this interest back to when he was invited to the Royal Vauxhall Tavern for a trans karaoke night and felt a sense of identification saying: "Who knows, in a different age, I might have wanted to be a girl."

Stezaker has also made films, usually consisting of still images and text.

Until 2006, Stezaker was Senior Tutor in Critical and Historical Studies at the Royal College of Art in London.

He works from his studio in St Leonards-on-Sea.

== Personal life ==
Stezaker is married to painter, Virginia Villalba.

Stezaker has ankylosing spondylitis, a form of arthritis, which he is trying to treat with shiatsu massage. In 2014, he had a heart attack and underwent triple bypass surgery. He has been told to slow down his work by his doctor, but says that when he stops he goes into a depression and the only solution is to start working again.

== Solo exhibitions ==
- Works, 1969–1971, Sigi Krauss Gallery, London, 1970. Catalogue available.
- Beyond Art for Art’s Sake: a Propus Mundus, Nigel Greenwood Gallery, London, 1972. Catalogue available.
- The Museum of Modern Art Oxford, 1973
- Galerie Decembre, Munster, 1974
- Galleria Lia Rumma, Rome, 1974
- Galleria Lia Rumma, Naples, 1974
- Nigel Greenwood Gallery, London, 1975
- Galerie Éric Fabre, Paris, 1975
- Nigel Greenwood Gallery, London, 1976
- Trois Oeuvres [Three Works], Galerie Éric Fabre, Paris, 1976. Catalogue available.
- Dream Allegories. John Stezaker Collages 1976-1977. Nigel Greenwood Gallery, London, 1977. Catalogue available.
- Galerie Éric Fabre, Paris, 1977
- Schema Gallery, Florence, 1977
- Spectro Arts Workshop, Newcastle, UK, 1977
- Fragments, The Photographers' Gallery, London, 1978. Catalogue available.
- Collages, 1977–1978, Ikon Gallery, Birmingham, 1978. Catalogue available.
- Southampton City Museum, Southampton, UK, 1978
- Galerie Éric Fabre, Paris, 1979
- Werke 1973-1978, Kuntsmueum Luzern, Kunstmuseum, Lucerne, Switzerland, 1979. Catalogue available.

== Selected publications ==
- John Stezaker: Marriage. Ridinghouse, 2007. With an essay by Cecilia Järdemar.
- John Stezaker: Masks. Ridinghouse in association with The Approach, 2008.
- The 3rd Person Archive, John Stezaker. Koenig Books, 2009.
- John Stezaker: Tabula Rasa. Ridinghouse in association with The Approach, 2010.
- John Stezaker: Silk Screens. Ridinghouse, 2010. Caoimhín Mac Giolla Léith.
- John Stezaker. Ridinghouse, 2011. Published to accompany an exhibition at Whitechapel Gallery, London
- John Stezaker: Film Still. Ridinghouse, 2011. With text and interview between David Campany and the artist.
- John Stezaker: Nude and Landscape. Ridinghouse in association with Rosenwald-Wolf Gallery, Philadelphia, 2013.
- John Stezaker: One on One. Ridinghouse in association with Tel Aviv Museum of Art, 2013.
