= Vincent Mauger =

French contemporary sculptor (born 1976)

Vincent Mauger (born in 1976, Rennes, France) is a French contemporary sculptor, who lives and work near Nantes.

== Education and Works ==
After graduating from the École nationale supérieure des Beaux-Arts of Paris and Angers (prof. Richard Deacon), he achieved his formation by a PhD at the National School of Fine Arts of Nantes.

His work is mostly composed by sculptures, drawings, videos that intend to materialize what could be a mental space. In his site-specific installations, he opposes the exhibition space with the mental perception of another space, leading the visitor through a confusing experience, for example at the Centre d'Art de la Maréchalerie of Versailles in 2013. He takes inspiration from mathematics, computer generated imagery but also from architecture and urbanism. His materials for sculpture and installation are often modular simple construction material such as bricks, concrete blocks, wood, glass or pvc tubes. He is currently represented by the Galerie Bertrand Grimont in Paris.
