= Edward Allington =

British artist and sculptor

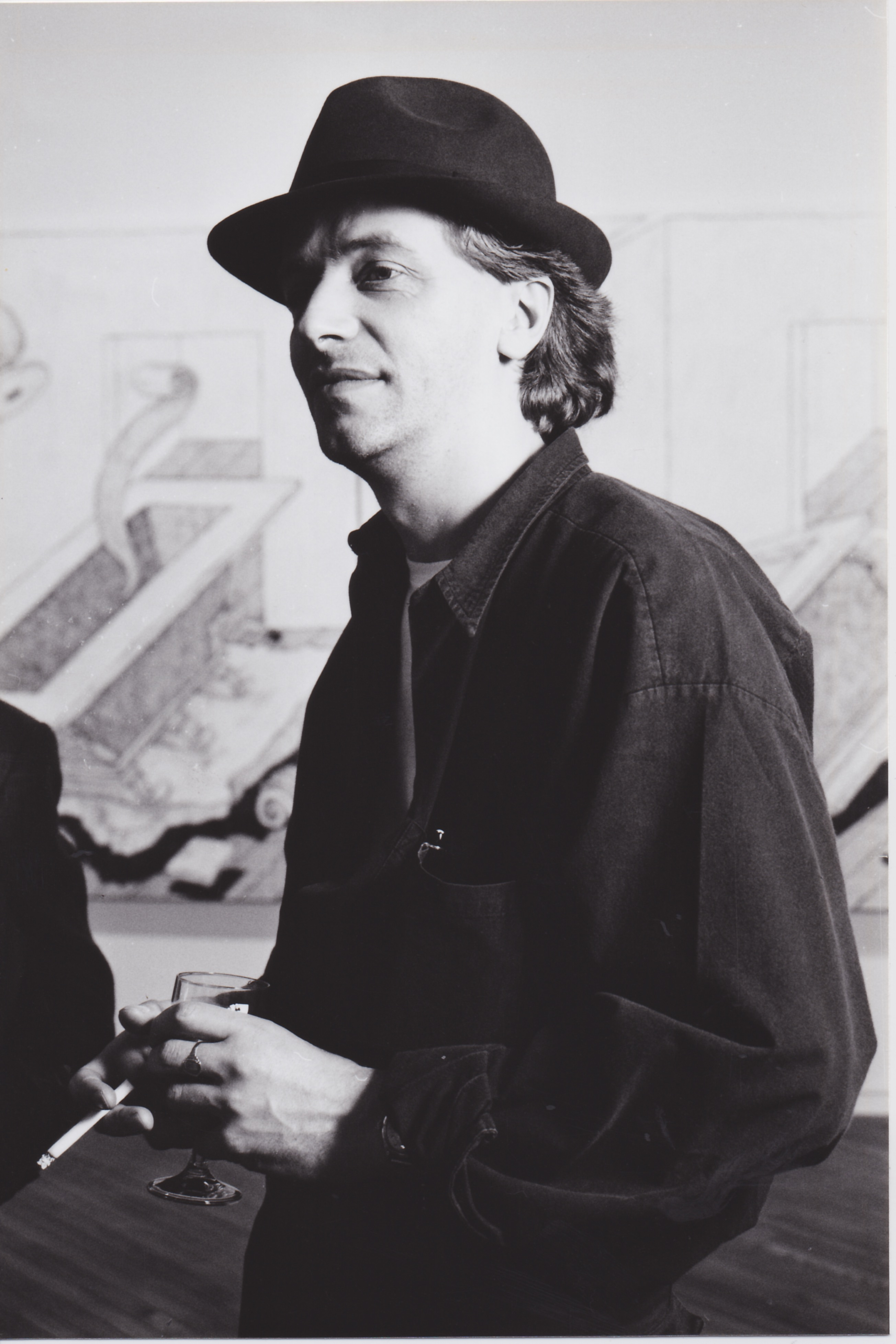
- Allington in early 1990s
- Born: Edward Thomas Allington; 24 June 1951; Troutbeck Bridge, Westmorland
- Died: 21 September 2017 (aged 66)
- Education: Lancaster College of Art, Central School of Art and Design, Royal College of Art
- Website: http://www.edwardallington.com/

Edward Thomas Allington (24 June 1951 – 21 September 2017) was a British artist and sculptor, best known for his part in the 1980s New British Sculpture movement.

== Biography ==
Born at Troutbeck Bridge, Westmorland, to Ralph Allington and his wife, Evelyn, Allington studied at Lancaster College of Art from 1968 to 1971, at the Central School of Art and Design in London from 1971 to 1974 and at the Royal College of Art from 1983 to 1984. He was a fellow at Exeter College of Art and Design 1975–77. He won the John Moores Liverpool Exhibition Prize in 1989, was Gregory Fellow in Sculpture at University of Leeds 1991–93 and Research Fellow in Sculpture at Manchester Metropolitan University in 1993. He received a fine art award to work at the British School at Rome in 1997. His work was included in the group exhibition 'Objects and Sculpture' at the Institute of Contemporary Arts in 1981 and 'The Sculpture Show' at The Hayward Gallery 1983. He exhibited widely in America, Japan and Europe.

Allington's work was influenced by his interest in the classical world of Greece and Rome and often included references to architectural details and ancient artefacts. His illusionistic drawings were often created on found ledgers and used oblique projection. He exhibited in museums and art galleries throughout the world and is represented in major national and international collections. Allington lived and worked in London and was a Professor and Head of Graduate Sculpture at the Slade School of Fine Art, University College London.

== Major collections ==
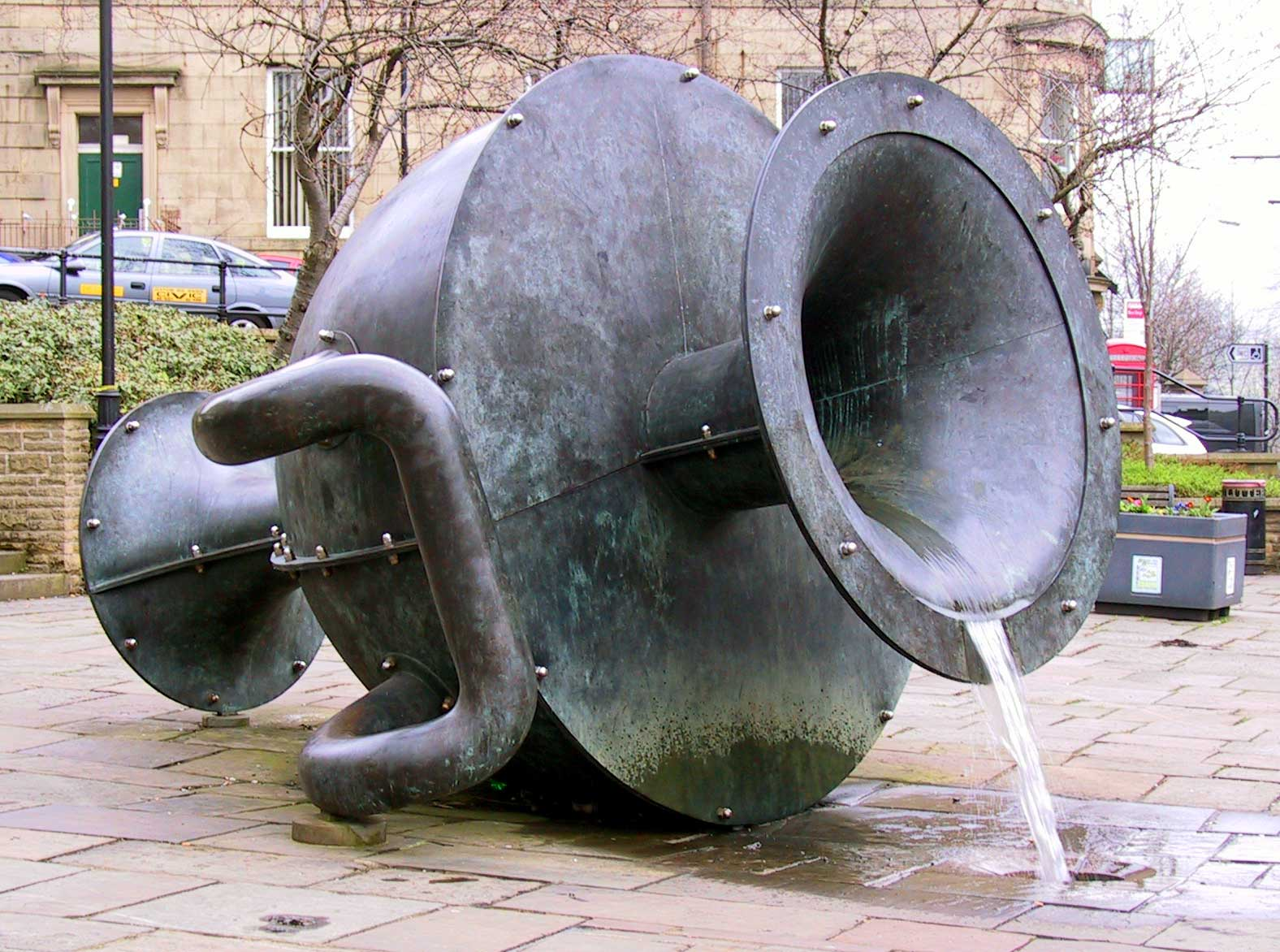
Edward Allington's sculpture Tilted Vase in Ramsbottom

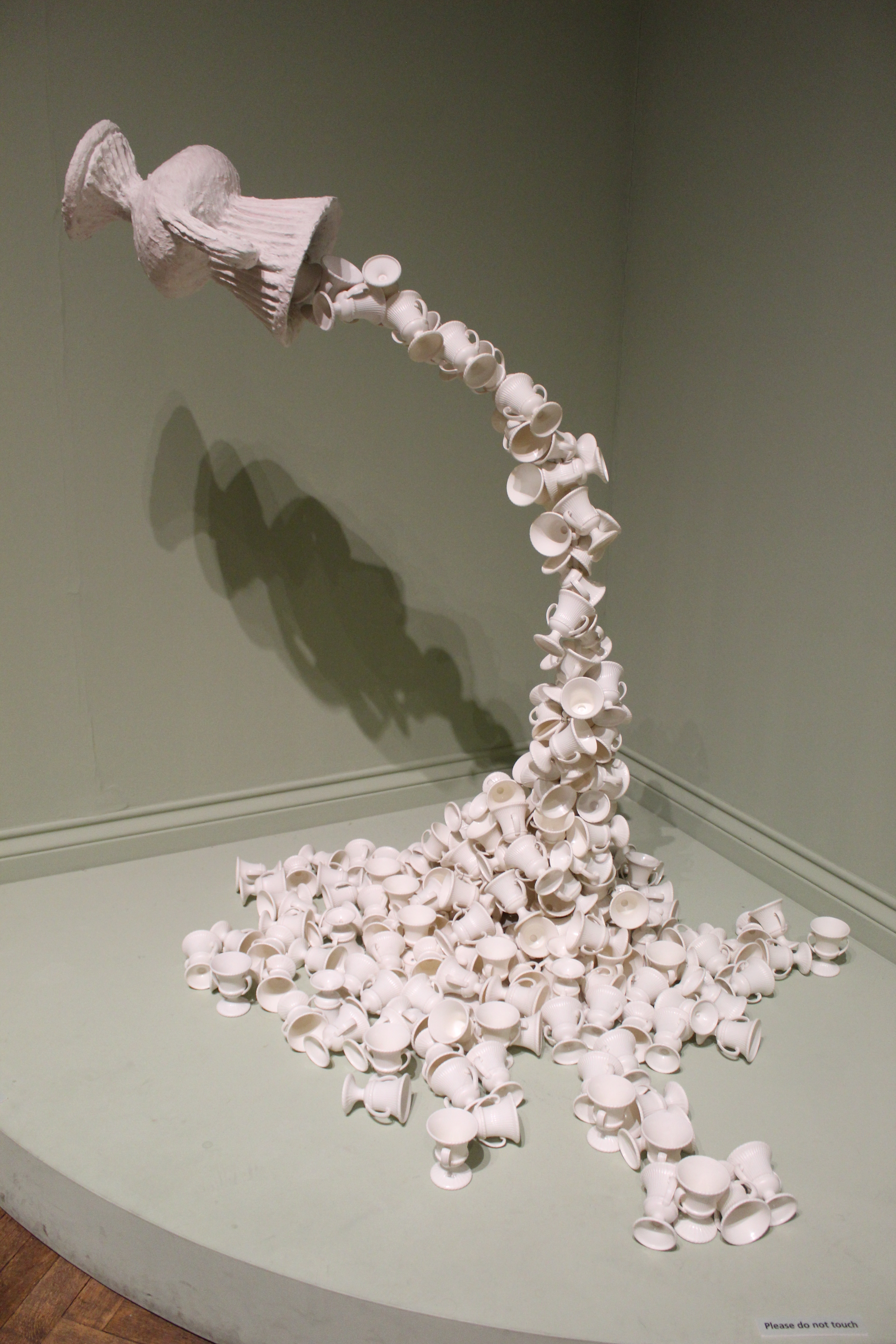
One Unforgiving Minute, Manchester Art Gallery

- The Tate Gallery
- The Victoria and Albert Museum
- The Irish Museum of Modern Art
- The Nagoya Prefectural Museum, Japan
- Leeds Art Gallery, Leeds

== Public works ==
- Fallender Tempel (Falling Temple), ca. 1990, Saarbrücken, Römerbrücke Power Plant
- Fallen Pediment (Piano) 1994 Cass Sculpture Foundation, Goodwood, West Sussex
- The Tilted Vase 1998 Ramsbottom Greater Manchester
- Three Doors, One Entrance 1999 Milton Keynes Theatre foyer. Milton Keynes
- Cochlea 2000 Jesus College, Cambridge
- The Algorithm 2005 University College Hospital, London

== Publications ==
- Edward Allington. (1983). Edward Allington: Drawing towards sculpture. Lisson Gallery.
- Edward Allington. (1984). In Pursuit of Savage Luxury. Midland Group.
- Edward Allington. (1985). Edward Allington: Bronzes & drawings. Lisson Gallery London. ISBN 978-0947830038.
- Edward Allington. (1999). Method for Sorting Cows: Essays 1993–97. Manchester Metropolitan University, Faculty of Art. ISBN 978-1900756037.
- Edward Allington. (2003). Edward Allington Site Projects. Bury Art Gallery & Museum. ISBN 978-0953891528.
- Edward Allington. (2005). Re Views: Artists and Public Space. Black Dog Publishing Ltd. ISBN 978-1904772200.
