= Shelagh Wakely =

British sculptor and experimental artist

- Born: Shelagh Barton Worthington; 22 October 1932
- Died: 19 March 2011 (aged 78)
- Education: Chelsea College of Art
- Known for: Sculpture

Shelagh Wakely (22 October 1932 – 19 March 2011) was a British sculptor and experimental artist.

Wakely was born in Madingley, Cambridgeshire in 1932. She studied painting and screen-printing at the Chelsea College of Art in the late 1950s. She also studied at the Royal College of Art and won a Rome Award to The British School At Rome in 1990. She began her career as a textile designer.

Her work is included in the collections of the Tate Museum and the British Council.
