= Julian Opie =

British artist

- Born: 1958 (age 67–68); London, England
- Education: Goldsmith's School of Art
- Known for: Painting; Sculpture
- Notable work: Reclining Nude (Gateshead Millennium Bridge, England); Ann Dancing (Indianapolis, USA, 2007)

Julian Opie (/ˈoʊpi/; born 1958) is a visual artist of the New British Sculpture movement.

== Life and education ==
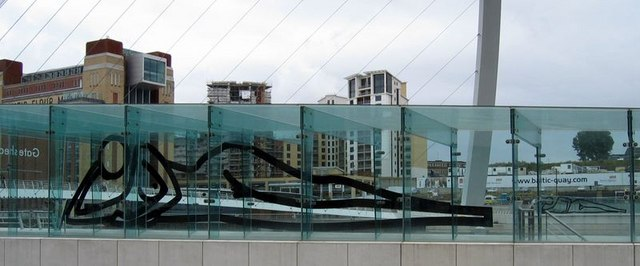
Opie's Reclining Nude at Gateshead Millennium Bridge

Opie was born in London in 1958 and raised in the city of Oxford. He attended The Dragon School and then Magdalen College School, Oxford, from 1972 to 1977. He graduated in 1982 from Goldsmiths, University of London, where he was taught by conceptual artist and painter Michael Craig-Martin. He was a Sargant Fellow at The British School at Rome in 1994.

== Work ==
Julian Opie’s artwork is similar to pop art. Portraits and animated walking figures, rendered with minimal detail in black line drawing, are hallmarks of the artist's style. His themes have been described as "engagement with art history, use of new technology, obsession with the human body" and "work with one idea across different media". Similarly, the national art critic of The Australian, Christopher Allen, laments Opie's "limited repertoire of tricks" and described his work as "slight and ultimately commercial, if not actually kitsch". When asked to describe his approach, Opie said "I often feel that trying to make something realistic is the one criterion I can feel fairly sure of. Another one I sometimes use is, would I like to have it in my room? And I occasionally use the idea, if God allowed you to show Him one [portrait] to judge you by, would this really be it?"

In 2007, the four-sided LED sculpture Ann Dancing was installed in Indianapolis, United States, as the first artwork on the Indianapolis Cultural Trail. Opie has also created a monument to singer Bryan Adams.

=== Public projects ===
Opie has presented many public projects in cities around the world, notably in the Dentsu Building in Tokyo (2002), City Hall Park in New York (2004), Mori Building, Omotesando Hills in Japan (2006), River Vltava in Prague (2007), Phoenix Art Museum USA (2007), Dublin City Gallery in Ireland (2008), Seoul Square in South Korea (2009), Regent's Place in London (2011), Calgary, Canada (2012), The Lindo Wing, St Mary's Hospital, London (2012) and more recently permanent installations at SMETS in Belgium, PKZ in Zürich and Carnaby Street, London, UK.

=== Commissions ===
One of Opie's most notable commissions was the design of an album cover for British pop band Blur in 2000, for which he received a Music Week CADS award. In 2006, he created an LED projection for U2's Vertigo world tour, and in 2008 Opie created a set design for Wayne McGregor's ballet Infra for the Royal Opera House in London. In 2010, he was commissioned by the National Portrait Gallery, London, to create a portrait of the inventor and engineer Sir James Dyson, titled James, Inventor. In 2019, for his former school Magdalen College School, Oxford, he created a digital screen showing two children in school uniform running.

== Public collections ==
Six of Opie's portraits are in the collection of the National Portrait Gallery, London: four portraits of the band members of Blur executed in colour print on paper, one of inventor and engineer Sir James Dyson rendered by inkjet on canvas, and a self-portrait, Julian with t-shirt, executed on an LCD screen with computer software. More than two dozen of Opie's portraits, landscapes, and other works are in the collection of the Tate and six works are in the collection of the Museum of Modern Art, New York. Other collections include Victoria and Albert Museum, Arts Council and the British Council in London; ICA Boston; Essl Collection in Vienna; IVAM in Spain; the Israel Museum in Jerusalem and Takamatsu City Museum of Art in Japan.
