= Sarah Todd Cunningham =

Politician in Hawaii Territorial Legislature

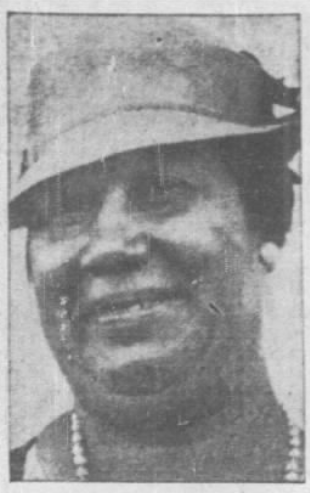
- Cunningham, in a 1936 campaign announcement

Member of the Hawaii Territorial Senate representing the 1st District
- In office 1937–1940
- In office 1943–1944

Personal details
- Born: April 9, 1894; Hilo, Hawaii
- Died: May 8, 1963 (aged 69); Napa, California
- Political party: Democratic Party of Hawaii (1926–1937); Hawaii Republican Party (after 1937)
- Spouse: Thomas M. Cunningham
- Children: 6

Sarah Todd Cunningham (April 9, 1894 – May 8, 1963) was an American politician who served in the Hawaii Territorial Senate.

== Early life ==
Sarah Todd Cunningham was born in Hilo, Hawaii, on April 9, 1894. Her father, William A. Todd, was a supervisor of Hawaii County and a fire chief for the Hawaiʻi Fire Department. He was born in Kailua-Kona. Her mother, Sarah Cook, was born in Hanalei on the island of Kauai.

She attended school in Hawaii, beginning her education in Hilo before attending Central Intermediate School and President William McKinley High School in Honolulu. She began working as a typesetter for the Hawaii Herald at age 16. She met Thomas M. Cunningham in 1916 while he was working as a timekeeper for Onomea Sugar Company; they were married the same year or in 1924. As of July 1936, the couple had six children.

== Career ==
=== Early career ===
Cunningham worked as a switchboard operator for the Hawaii Telephone Company for seven years, becoming a Chief Operator. She worked at City Transfer for 10 years as a bookkeeper and stenographer, and served as Acting Postmaster at the Hilo Post Office for 13 months. She began her involvement in politics in 1926, serving as an assistant campaign manager for the Democratic Party of Hawaii.

=== In the legislature ===
Cunningham was elected to the Hawaii Territorial Senate to represent the 1st District as a Democrat with her term beginning in 1937. She was the first woman senator from the island of Hawaii and was elected with more votes than any other senatorial candidate from the island that year except for James Campsie. The Honolulu Star-Bulletin described her as "self-educated, energetic, pleasant-speaking, and quick-acting", and favorably characterized her as capable and committed. She was one of three new members of the Territorial Senate, while 11 incumbents were reelected.

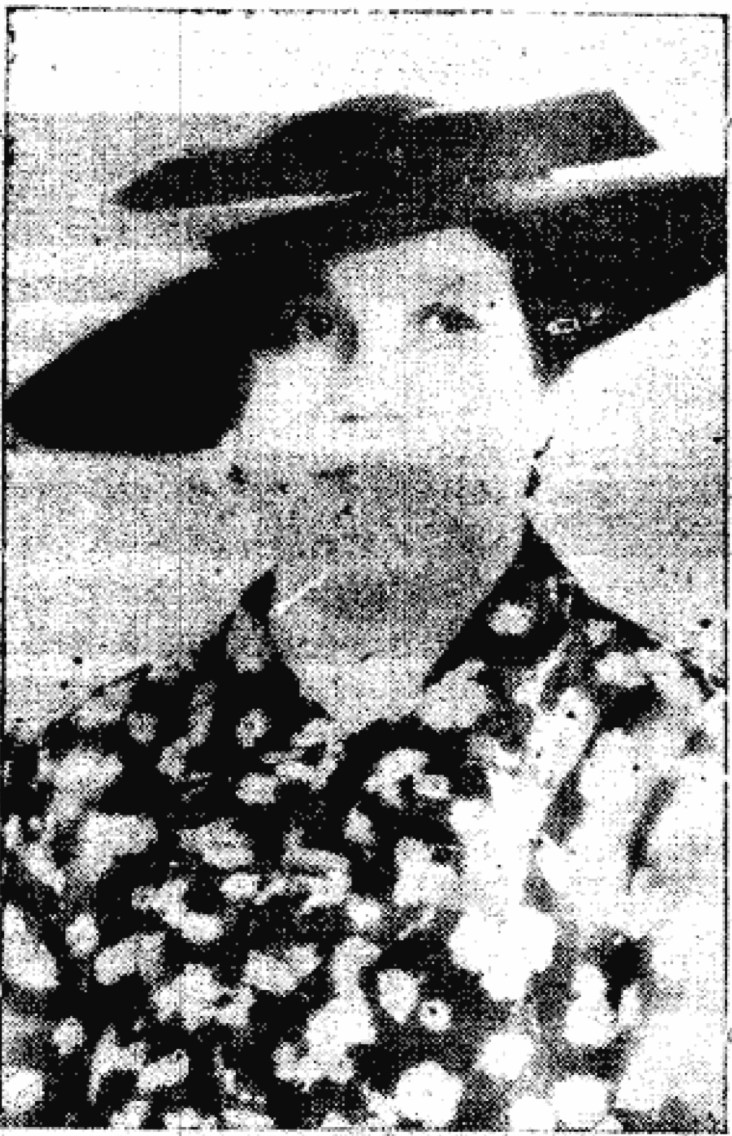
Cunningham, in a 1936 campaign announcement

While she was elected as a Democrat, Cunningham snubbed local Democratic leadership during her campaign, and her legislative activity aligned her with the Republican faction in the Territorial Senate. Her vote gave the Republicans a majority. The Honolulu Advertiser reported that this enabled them to pass several legislative items that benefited Cunningham's district, praising her "political sagacity" and describing her as an "example of what women can do in public and business life".

In 1937, Cunningham proposed consolidating two circuit courts on Hawaii Island, and eliminating a district court she said had an obsolete building that would cost too much to repair.

In 1939, Cunningham introduced a bill to eliminate personal property tax on Hawaii Island. It passed through the Territorial Senate on April 15, 1939, with 11 votes in favor and 4 against. She presented the bill to the Hawaii Tribune-Herald as a counterpart to a gas tax measure introduced by Territorial Senator Harry H. Holt, which she said would provide enough money to make the property tax unnecessary. Territorial Representative Henry Lai Hipp spoke against the bill, saying he didn't "believe that county obligations can be met" if the tax was removed.

Cunningham was reelected in the same district as a Republican for the term beginning in 1939. She was voted out in the 1940 election. She was again elected as a Republican for a two-year unexpired term beginning in 1943.

In 1943, Cunningham voted against legislation to establish a police commission for Hawaii Island. The legislation passed the Territorial Senate with 13 in support and 2 opposing. The Tribune-Herald noted that both she and Territorial Senator William H. Hill had previously supported police commission legislation, and questioned whether their opposition was a concession in return for their historical support by the "police machine". The newspaper also stated that Hill was in an ongoing feud with Charles Silva, another Territorial Senator from Hawaii Island, and expressed concern that Cunningham was siding with Hill and leaving the island's delegation "irrevocably split in equal halves"; it concluded by calling on the members to "put aside personal grievances and bickering".
