= Alison Wilding =

English artist

- Born: 1948 (age 77–78); Blackburn, Lancashire, U.K.
- Known for: Sculpture

Alison Mary Wilding OBE, RA (born 7 July 1948) is an English artist noted for her multimedia abstract sculptures. Wilding's work has been displayed in galleries internationally.

== Life ==
Wilding was born in Blackburn, Lancashire. Between 1966 and 1967 she studied at the Nottingham College of Art, then at the Ravensbourne College of Art and Design in Chislehurst from 1967 to 1970 and, from 1970 to 1973, the Royal College of Art in London. Her artistic career gained momentum in the 1980s when she was part of a group of sculptors including Anthony Gormley and Richard Deacon.

Wilding was appointed an Officer of the Order of the British Empire (OBE) in the 2019 New Year Honours, for services to art.

Since 2018 she has been the Eranda Professor of Drawing at the Royal Academy Schools. She lives and works in London, and has been represented by Karsten Schubert for over 30 years.

== Career and work ==
Alison Wilding, Untitled (Angry Drawing IV), 1988, charcoal, oil crayon and gouache on paper, 420 × 593 mm

Wilding's interest in sculpture was established during her time at the Nottingham College of Art. Her early influences include Constantin Brâncusi and ideas of simple construction.

She has used traditional materials, often found as reused, such as wood, stone and bronze, alongside others like steel, wax, silk, and rubber. These are often used in unusual combinations: Stormy Weather (1987), for example, is made from pigment, beeswax and oil rubbed into galvanised steel. Of her eclectic media, Wilding has said "I like stuff and not particular materials." Wilding's work typically includes two opposing materials purposed with representing positive and negative forces, creating a balance within the art. She maintains that she is conscious of waste and does not like to produce work that will not be displayed.

Wilding self-archives her work, personally giving them unique numbers and descriptions that are logged in small black notebooks. The notebooks also contain key details of her work, such as early designs and logs of her making progress. She has expressed that she would like the books to be destroyed rather than leave them to an institution despite requests from organisations such as the Henry Moore Institute.

In addition to sculpture, Wilding has also produced a variety of artworks on paper. On drawings, she says: 'The thing I like about drawings is that they can float. You don’t think about gravity. They do something really different. That is the freedom and pleasure of drawing for me. You are not weighed down by the material world in the same way. So, maybe, they are more imaginative.'

Wilding's approach to her work is often active and arbitrary, basing her decisions on her current time and place. She also takes a strictly non-political approach to her work, claiming; 'I don’t think art is going to change anyone’s life, not in the way film can do'.

Wilding's first solo exhibition was displayed at the Serpentine Gallery in 1985. She was subsequently exhibited at the Museum of Modern Art in New York in 1987.

In 1991, a major retrospective of Wilding's work, Alison Wilding: Immersion – Sculpture from Ten Years, was held at Tate Liverpool. She was nominated for the Turner Prize in 1988 (and later in 1992) and received a Henry Moore Fellowship for the British School at Rome in 1988. In 1999 she was made a Royal Academician. Her only large-scale public artwork "Ambit" was installed in the River Wear at Sunderland in 1999, taking the form of a necklace of stainless-steel tubes floating in the river, and lit up from underwater at night. It was subsequently exhibited in the Manchester Ship Canal. It was scrapped in 2014.

Wilding won a Paul Hamlyn award in 2008. In the same year she won the Charles Wollaston Award presented by the Royal Academy for the most distinguished work in their summer exhibition.

== Exhibitions, awards, and collections ==
=== Solo exhibitions ===
- Young Friends of the Tate Gallery, Tate Gallery, London, UK (1970)
- Alison Wilding and Shelagh Wakely (with Shelagh Wakely), AIR Gallery, London, UK (1976)
- Sculpture (with Shirazeh Houshiary), Kettle's Yard, Cambridge, UK (1982)
- Salvatore Ala Gallery, New York, USA (1983)
- Serpentine Gallery, London, UK (1985)
- Salvatore Ala Gallery, Milan Italy (1985)
- New Sculpture, Salvatore Ala Gallery, New York, USA (1986)
- New Sculpture, Richard Salmon Ltd, London, UK (1986)
- Galleri Lång, Malmö, Sweden (1986)
- Projects: Alison Wilding, Museum of Modern Art, New York, USA (1987)
- Into the Brass, Richard Salmon Ltd, London, UK (1987)
- Sculptures, Karsten Schubert, London, UK (1987)
- Sculpture, Asher/ Faure Gallery, Los Angeles, USA (1988)
- Alison Wilding: 1987–98, Karsten Schubert, London, UK (1988)
- Alison Wilding, Hirschl & Adler Modern, New York, USA (1989)
- Skulptura, Moderna Galerija, Ljubljan, Yugoslavia (1989)
- Sculptures, Karsten Schubert, London, UK (1990)
- Immersion, Sculpture from Ten Years, Tate Gallery, Liverpool, UK (1991)
- Exposure, Henry Moore Foundation Studio, Halifax, UK (1991)
- Alison Wilding, Asher/ Faure Gallery, Los Angeles, CA, USA (1992)
- Bare, Newlyn Art Gallery, Penzance and Ikon Gallery, Birmingham, UK (1993)
- Recent Sculptures, Karsten Schubert, London, UK (1993)
- Air and Angels (with Anthony Gormley), ITN Building, London, UK (1994)
- Ambit, The Mattress Factory Art Museum, Pittsburgh PA, USA (1994)
- New Sculptures and Etchings, Karsten Schubert, London, UK (1995)
- Echo, Angel Row Gallery, Nottingham, UK (1995)
- Harbour, Alison Wilding's Studio, Tannery Arts, London, UK (1995)
- Echo, Douglas Hyde Gallery, Dublin, Ireland, Karsten Schubert, London (1996)
- Sculptures, Musée des Beaux-Arts et de la Dentelle de Calais, Calais, France (1996)
- A Project, Robert Miller Gallery, New York (1997)
- Territories, The Edmonton Art Gallery, York University, York, Canada (1997)
- Intensities, Abbot Hall Museum and Art Gallery, Kendal, UK (1997)
- Alison Wilding, New Art Centre, Roche Court Sculpture Park, Salisbury, UK (1997)
- Ambit, City Library, Art Centre, Sunderland, UK (1997)
- Artanspennine '98, Chapel of St John the Evangelist, Skipton Castle, Skipton, Yorkshire, UK (1998)
- Northern Art Gallery for Contemporary Art, Sunderland, UK (1998)
- Ambit, Panns Bank Public Art Project, Civic Centre, Sunderland, UK (1998)
- New Art Centre, Roche Court, Wiltshire, UK (2000)
- Contract, Henry Moore Foundation Studio, Dean Clough, Halifax, UK (2000)
- Template Drawings, Karsten Schubert, London, UK (2002)
- Alison Wilding: Migrant, Peter Pears Gallery and Snape Maltings, Aldeburgh, UK (2003)
- Alison Wilding: New Drawings, The Drawing Gallery, London, UK (2005)
- Alison Wilding: Sculpture, Betty Cunningham Gallery, New York (2005)
- Vanish and Detail, Fred, London, UK (2005)
- North House Gallery, Manningtree, Essex, UK (2006)
- Rupert Wace Ancient Art, London (2006)
- Acanthus asymmetrically, Offer Waterman, Mayfair, London, UK (2008)
- Tracking, Karsten Schubert, London, UK (2008)
- Chamber Works, Benveniste Contemporary, Madrid, Spain (2010)
- All Cats are Grey..., Karsten Schubert, London, UK (2010)
- How the Land Lies, New Art Centre, Salisbury, UK (2011)
- Alison Wilding: Art School Drawings from the 1960s and 1970s, Karsten Schubert, London, UK (2011)
- Alison Wilding: Drawing, 'Drone 1-10', Karsten Schubert, London, UK (2012)
- Deep Water, The Whitworth Art Gallery, Manchester, UK (2013)
- Alison Wilding, Tate Britain, Milbank, London (2013)
- Arena Redux, Art House Foundation, London, UK (2016)
- Acanthus asymmetrically, Offer Waterman, Mayfair, London (2017)
- Alison Wilding, The Whitworth Gallery, Manchester, UK (2018)
- Right Here and Out There, De La Warr Pavilion, Bexhill-on-Sea, UK (2018)
- Arena, Leeds Art Gallery, UK (2018)
- Alison Wilding: On the Edge, Jesus College, Cambridge, UK (2019)
- Doors Closing, Doors Opening, Betty Cunningham Gallery, Lower East Side, New York (2020)
- Mesmer, Again, Karsten Schubert, London, UK (2020)

=== Group exhibitions ===
- Clare Court, Trinity College, Cambridge, UK (1973)
- Space Studios, London, UK (1975)
- Six Sculptors, Riverside Studios, London, UK (1978)
- New Sculpture: A Selection, Ikon Gallery, Birmingham, UK (1979)
- 55 Wapping Artists, Wapping, London, UK (1979)
- Eight Artists: Women: 1980, Acme Gallery, London, UK (1980)
- Whitechapel Open, Whitechapel Gallery, London, UK (1980)
- Wapping Artists 1980, Open Studio Exhibition, Wapping, London, UK (1980)
- GLAA Awards 1981, Woodland Art Gallery, London, UK (1981)
- Wapping Artists 1981, Wapping, London, UK (1981)
- Le Sculpture/La Sculpture, The Drawing Schools Gallery, Eton College, Windsor, UK (1982)
- Wapping Artists Open Studio Exhibition, Wapping, London, UK (1982)
- Collazione Inglese, Scuola di San Pasquale, Venice, Italy (1982)
- Sculpture in the Garden, Camden Arts Centre, London, UK (1982)
- XVII Paris Biennale, Musée d'Art Moderne de la Ville de Paris, Paris, France (1982)
- Sarah Broadpiece, Richard Wentworth, Alison Wilding, St Paul's Gallery, Leeds (1982)
- Figures and Objects, John Hansard Gallery, University of Southampton, Southampton, UK (1983)
- Whitechapel Open, Whitechapel Gallery, London, UK (1983)
- Tolly Cobold/ Eastern Arts 4th National Exhibition, Fitzwilliam Museum, Cambridge; Christchurch Mansion, Ipswich; Museum of Modern Art, Oxford; Barbican Art Gallery, London; Talbot Rice Art Centre, Edinburgh; and Leeds City Art Gallery, Leeds, UK (1983)
- The Sculpture Show, Serpentine Gallery and The Southbank Centre, London, UK (1983)
- Transformations: New Sculpture from Britain, 17th Biennale de Sao Paulo, Museu de Arte Moderna, Rio de Janeiro, Brazil; Museo de Arte Moderna, Mexico City, Mexico; Fundação Calouste Gulbenkian, Lisbon, Portugal (1983)
- Collazione Inglese, Scuola di San Pasquale, Venice, Italy (1984)
- The British Art Show, Arts Council of Great Britain, touring to City of Birmingham Museum and Art Gallery; Royal Scottish Academy Edinburgh; Mappin Art Gallery; Sheffield, Southampton Art Gallery, UK (1984)
- Summer Exhibition, Salvatore Ala, New York, USA (1986)
- Jeffrey Dennis, Alan Green, Alison Wilding, Third Eye Centre, Glasgow, UK (1986)
- Between Object and Image, Palacio de Velázquez, Madrid; Fundación Caja de Pensiones, Barcelona; Museo de Bellas Artes, Bilbao, Spain (1986)
- Sculpture: Nine Artists from Britain, Louisiana Museum of Modern Art, Humlebaek, Denmark (1986)
- Prospect '86: An International Exhibition of Contemporary Art, Frankfurter Kunstvereins, Steinernen Haus am Romerberg, Schirn Kunsthalle, Frankfurt, Germany (1986)
- Third Generation Women, Canterbury Fringe Festival, Canterbury, UK (1986)
- Domenico Bianchi, Antony Gormley, Roberto Pace, Alison Wilding, Salvatore Ala Gallery, Milan, Italy (1986)
- Starlit Waters: British Sculpture, 1968–88, Tate Gallery, Liverpool, UK (1988)
- British Now: Sculpture et Autres Dessins, Musée d’Art Contemporain de Montréal, Montreal, Canada (1988)
- Brittanica: 30 Ans de Sculpture, Musée des Beaux-Artes André Malraux, Le Havre; L'Ecole D'Architecture de Normandie, Darnétal; Musée D'Évrex, Ancien Éveche, Évrex, France (1988)
- Cinquièmes Ateliers Internationaux des Pays de la Loire, Abbaye Royale de Fontevraud, Fontevraud, France (1988)
- British Art: The Literate Link, Asher/Faure Gallery, Los Angeles, CA, USA (1988)
- Changing Group Exhibition: Gunther Forg, Thomas Grunfeld, Bob Law, Thomas Locher, Ed Ruscha, Tony Tasset, Alison Wilding, Karsten Schubert, London, UK (1988)
- Seriös, Gallerie Wanda Reiff, Maastricht, The Netherlands (1988)
- Vanitas, Norwich School of Art Gallery, Norwich, UK (1988)
- Edinburgh International: Reason and Emotion in Contemporary Art, Royal Scottish Academy, Edinburgh, UK (1988)
- Lead, Hirschl & Adler Modern, New York, USA (1988)
- Viewpoint: British Art of the 80s, Musée Royaux d’Art et d’Histoire, Brussels, Belgium (1988)
- Current Affairs: British Painting and Sculpture in the 1980s, Museum of Modern Art, Oxford, UK, and toured by the British Council to Muscarnok, Budapest, Hungary; Narodni Galerie, Prague, Czech Republic; Zachęta National Gallery of Art, Warsaw, Poland (1988)
- Art Brittiskt 1980: Tal, Liljevalchs Konsthall, Stockholm, Sweden and Sarah Hildén Museum, Tampere, Finland (1988)
- Beelden en Banieren, Fort Asperen, Acquoy, The Netherlands (1988)
- Atlantic Sculpture, Art Centre, College of Design, Pasadena, CA, USA (1988)
- Vessel, Serpentine Gallery, London, UK (1988)
- Twentieth Century British Sculpture, New Art Centre, Roche Court Sculpture Park, Salisbury, UK (1988)
- D. De Cordova, L. Ford, P. Randall-Page, S. Johnson, K. MacCarthy, H. Stylianides, M. Pennie, V. Woropay, A. Wilding, Chelsea School of Art, Manresa Road Gallery, London, UK (1988)
- Casting an Eye: Curated by Richard Deacon and Alison Wilding, Cornerhouse Manchester, Manchester UK (1988)
- Second Istanbul Biennale, Istanbul, Turkey (1989)
- All That Matters: Richard Deacon, Tom Dean, Remo Salvadori, Alison Wilding, Art Gallery of Windsor, Ontario; Mendel Art Gallery, Saskatoon; Saidye Bronfman Centre, Montréal, Canada (1989)
- Britse Sculptuur: British Sculpture 1960–1988, Museum van Hedendaagse Kunst, Antwerp, Belgium (1989)
- Sculpture Anglaise 1960–88, Centre Régional d’Art Contemporain Midi-Pyrénées, Cedex, France
- Now for the Future: Purchases for the Arts Council Collection since 1984, Hayward Gallery, London UK (1990)
- Rebecca Horn, Willi Kopf, Richard Long, Alison Wilding, Centre d' art Contemporain du Domaine de Kerguéhennec, Bignan, France (1990)
- Sculptors' Drawings, Bellas Artes, Santa Fe, NM, USA (1991)
- The Lick of the Eye, Shoshana Wayne Gallery, Santa Monica, CA, USA (1991)
- Pulsió (Louise Bourgeois, Pepe Espaliu, Alison Wilding), Sala d’Exposicions de la Fundació La Caixa, Barcelona, Spain (1991)
- Traces of the Figure, City Museum and Art Gallery, Stoke on Trent and Cartwright Hall, Bradford, UK (1992)
- Whitechapel Open 1992, Whitechapel Gallery, London, UK (1992)
- Summer Group Show, Karsten Schubert, London, UK (1992)
- New Art Centre, Roche Court Sculpture Park, Salisbury, UK (1992)
- Fifth Anniversary Exhibition, Karsten Schubert, London, UK (1992)
- The Tuner Prize 1992: Grenville Davey, David Tremlett, Damien Hirst, Alison Wilding, Tate Gallery, London, UK (1992)
- Les Collections du Fonds Régional d’Art, Contemporain des Pays de la Loire au Musée des Beaux-Arts de Nantes, Nantes, France (1992)
- Recent British Sculpture, Arts Council of Great Britain Touring Exhibition, UK (1993)
- Cámaras de Fricción: Pedro Cabrita Reis, Sophie Calle, Alison Wilding, Juan Usle, Galería Luis Adelantado, Valencia, Spain (1993)
- Hindsight: Selected Works Made for the Henry Moore Sculpture Trust Studio 1989–93, The Henry Moore Sculpture Trust Studio, Halifax, UK (1993)
- Sculpture of the 1980s: Edward Allington, Tony Cragg, Julian Opie, Alison Wilding, Connaught Brown, London, UK (1993)
- Informationsdienst, Art Acker, Berlin, Germany (1993)
- Made Strange: New British Sculpture, Museum Ludwig, Budapest, Hungary (1993)
- Five Works: Keith Coventry, Michael Landy, Bridget Riley, Rachel Whiteread and Alison Wilding, Karsten Schubert, London, UK (1993)
- Then and Now: Twenty-Three Years at the Serpentine Gallery, Serpentine Gallery, London, UK (1993)
- Inadvertently: Stuart Arends, Judy Fiskin, Llyn Foulkes, Steve Gianakos, Maxwell Hendler, Barbara Kruger, Allan McCollum, Gwynn Murrill, Ellen Phelan, Alison Wilding, Asher Faure Gallery, Los Angeles, CA, US (1993)
- In Site: New British Sculpture, The National Museum of Contemporary Art, Oslo, Norway (1993)
- Group Show: Keith Coventry, Peter Davis, Anya Gallaccio, Zebedee Jones, Bridget Riley and Alison Wilding, Karsten Schubert, London, UK (1994)
- Natural Settings, Chelsea Physic Garden, London, UK (1995)
- Cabinet Art, Jason and Rhodes Gallery, London, UK (1995)
- British Art of the 1980s & 1990s: Works from the Weltkunst Collection, The Irish Museum of Modern Art, Dublin, Ireland (1995)
- In Passing, The Tannery, London, UK (1995)
- Home and Away: Internationalism and British Art 1900–90, Tate Gallery, Liverpool, UK (1995)
- Objects in Advance of the Concept, Burnaby Art Gallery, Burnaby, Canada (1995)
- Summer Group Show, Karsten Schubert, London, UK (1995)
- British Abstract Art, Part 2: Sculpture, Flowers East Gallery, London, UK (1995)
- Decadence, Trondheim Art Union, Trondheim, Norway (1995)
- Here and Now, Serpentine Gallery, London, UK (1995)
- British Contemporary Sculpture: From Henry Moore to the 1990s, Auditoria de Galicia, Santiago de Compostela and Fundacio de Serralves, Porto, Spain (1995)
- New Art Centre, Roche Court Sculpture Park, Salisbury, UK (1995)
- Plastic, Richard Salmon Gallery, London; Arnolfini Gallery, Bristol; and The New Art Gallery, Walsall, UK (1996)
- A Sculptor's Choice: Works Selected by Ann Christopher, Royal Academy of Arts, London, UK (1996)
- Orte des Möglichen: Weibliche Positionen in der Bildenden Kunst, Achenbach Kunsthandel, Düsseldorf, Germany and Hypobank International S.A., Luxembourg (1996)
- British Abstract Art Part 3: Works on Paper, Flowers East, London, UK (1996)
- From Figure to Object: A Century of Sculptor's Drawings, Frith Street Gallery and Karsten Schubert, London, UK (1996)
- Twelfth Cleveland International Drawing Biennale, Cleveland Gallery, Middlesbrough, UK (1996)
- Material Culture: The Object in British Art of the 1980s and 1990s, Hayward Gallery, London, UK (1997)
- Building Site, The Architectural Association School of Architecture, London, UK (1997)
- Marking Presence, ArtSway, Lymington, Hampshire, UK (1997)
- Richard Wentworth's Thinking Aloud, Kettle's Yard, Cambridge and Camden Arts Centre, London, UK (1998)
- Forjar el Espacio: La Escultura Forjada del Siglo XX, Centro Atlántico de Arte Moderno, Gran Canaria, Spain (1998)
- International Drawing Workshops, RCA Drawing Studio, London, UK (1998)
- Interactive: An Exhibition of Contemporary British Sculpture, Amerada Hess Gallery, London, UK (1998)
- Drawing Itself, The London Institute Gallery, London, UK (1998)
- The Edward R. Broida Collection: A Selection of Works, Orlando Museum of Art, Orlando, Florida, USA (1998)
- At Home with Art, a national touring exhibition from the Hayward Gallery, London, UK (1999)
- Furniture, John Hansard Gallery, Southampton and Bluecoat Gallery, Liverpool, in association with Richard Salmon Gallery, London, UK (1999)
- Triennial Sculpture Exhibition, Royal West of England Academy, Bristol, UK (1999)
- Forger L’espace: La Sculpture Forgée au XX Siècle, Musée des Beaux-Arts et de la Dentelle, Calais, France (1999)
- Shine, The Lowry, Salford, UK
- Sublime: The Darkness and the Light: Works from the Arts Council Collection, John Hansard Gallery, Southampton, UK (1999)
- Den Haag Sculptuur 1999, The Hague, The Netherlands (1999)
- Bankside Browser: An Archive, St. Christopher's House, London, UK (1999)
- Sculpture and the Divine, Winchester Cathedral, Winchester, UK (2000)
- Sculpture, an Abbey and a Cathedral, Gloucester Cathedral, Malmesbury Abbey, and Abbey House Gardens, Gloucester, UK (2000)
- Robert Hopper Memorial Exhibition, Yorkshire Sculpture Park, Wakefield, UK (2000)
- ...from little acorns... Early Works by Academicians, Royal Academy of the Arts, London, UK (2002)
- Shine, The Lowry Centre, Salford Quays, UK (2002)
- Contemporary Drawing Exhibition: Finalists of Pizza Express Prospects 2002, Essor Gallery Project Space, London, UK (2002)
- Pure Containment: Sculptures from the Arts Council Collection, Orleans House Gallery, Twickenham, UK (2002)
- Thy Neighbour's Ox, Space Station Sixty-Five, London, UK (2003)
- Contemporary Collecting: New Art for Manchester, Manchester Art Gallery, Manchester, UK (2003)
- Drawing One Hundred, Drawing Room, London, UK (2003)
- Nightwood, Rhodes & Mann Gallery, London, UK (2003)
- Autres Dentelles, Musée des Beaux-Arts et de la Dentelle de Calais, Calais, France (2003)
- Sculpture in the Close, Jesus College, Cambridge, UK (2003)
- Glad That Things Don't Talk, Irish Museum of Modern Art, Dublin, Ireland (2003)
- Sterling Stuff: Sculptures in Silver, Sigurjón Ólafsson Museum, Reykjavík, Iceland (2003)
- Vial Wit, Sir Hugh Casson Room, Royal Academy of the Arts, London, UK (2004)
- Daddy Pop: The Search for Art Parents, Anne Faggionato Gallery, London, UK (2004)
- 25 Artists 25 Drawings, The Drawing Galery, Walford, UK (2004)
- 40 Artists 40 Drawings, The Drawing Gallery, Walford, UK (2005)
- Raised Awareness, Tate Modern, London, UK (2005)
- Drawing Two Hundred, Drawing Room, London, UK (2005)
- The Print Show, Kettle's Yard, Cambridge, UK (2005)
- Effervescence: La Sculpture ‘Anglaise’ dans les Collections Publiques Française de 1969 à 1989, Musée des Beaux-Arts d’Angers, Angers, France (2005)
- Responding to Rome: British Artists in Rome 1995–2005, Estorick Collection of Modern Italian Art, London, UK
- How to Improve the World: 60 Years of British Art in the Arts Council Collection, Hayward Gallery, London, UK (2006)
- Drawing Inspiration, Abbot Hall Gallery, Kendal, UK (2006)
- Paris: 16 Artists/ 32 Drawings, The Drawing Gallery, Watford, UK (2006)
- Sculpture at McLaren, The McLaren Technology Centre, London, UK (2007)
- Rummage: Sculptors' Drawings, The Winchester Gallery, Winchester School of Art, UK (2007)
- Seventeen at the Wharf Road Project, Seventeen, London (2008)
- Between Metaphor and Object: Art of the 90s from the IMMA Collection, Irish Museum of Modern Art, Dublin, CORE- Berthot, Bess, Fratteggiani Bianchi, Frecon, Lees, Therrien, Wilding, Wilmarth, Betty Cunningham Gallery, Chelsea, New York (2009)
- Multiple Store, Westbrook Gallery, London, UK (2009)
- The Black Page, Shandy Hall Gallery, Coxwold, UK (2009)
- Drawing Biennial 2009, Drawing Room, London, UK (2009)
- North House Gallery 10th Anniversary Show Part 1 and Part 2: Mainly Sky, North House Gallery, Manningtree, UK (2009)
- Super Farmer's Market, Handel Street Projects, London, UK (2010)
- Summer Exhibition 2010, Royal Academy of Arts, London, UK (2010)
- The Thought of Stuff, RBS Galleries, London, UK (2010)
- From Floor to Sky, Ambika P3 Gallery, University of Westminster, London, UK (2010)
- Drawing Biennial 2011, Drawing Room, London, UK (2011)
- Drawing: Sculpture, Leeds Art Gallery, Leeds, UK (2012)
- Unknown Fields: Recent British Drawings, Trinity Contemporary, London, UK (2012)
- Sculptors' Drawings & Works on Paper, Pangolin London, UK (2012)
- Here We Go: A Changing Group Show, Karsten Schubert, London, UK (2013)
- Drawings, Karsten Schubert, London, UK (2013)
- With An Apple I Will Astonish, Large Glass, London, UK (2013)
- Here, There, and Somewhere in Between: The Royal Academy at Hatfield House, Royal Academy of Arts, Hatfield UK (2013)
- Drawing Biennial 2013, Drawing Room London, UK (2013)
- Multiple Market, Handel Street Projects, London, UK (2014)
- Shelagh Wakely: A View from a Window, Camden Arts Centre, London, UK (2014)
- Summer Exhibition 2014, Royal Academy of Arts, London, UK (2014)
- Abstract Drawing, Drawing Room London, UK (2014)
- The Multiple Store, Paul Stolper, London, UK (2015)
- MAKING IT: Sculpture in Britain: 1977–1986, Mead Gallery, Warwick Arts Centre, Coventry, Yorkshire Sculpture Park, Wakefield, UK (2015)
- The Christmas Show 2015, Caroline Wiseman Modern Art, Aldeburgh, UK (2015)
- Drawing Biennial 2015, Drawing Room, London, UK (2015)
- Sculpture as Object, Duveens BP Collection Display, Tate Britain, London, UK (2016)
- Extra Terrestrial: Tess Jaray and Alison Wilding, East Gallery at NUA, Norwich, UK (2016)
- Making It: Sculpture in Britain 1977–1986, City Art Centre, Edinburgh, UK (2016)
- Art of the Postcard, Handel Street Projects, Islington, London, UK (2017)
- 249th Summer Exhibition, Royal Academy of Arts, London, UK (2017)
- 250th Summer Exhibition, Royal Academy of Arts, London, UK (2018)
- Tony Carter: By Bread Only (1978-9), Henry Moore Institute, Leeds, UK (2018)
- The Sculpture Collections, Henry Moore Institute, Leeds, UK (2018)
- Women of the Royal Academy RA250, Abbot Hall Gallery, Kendal, UK (2018)
- Carl Plackman and His Circle, Pangolin London, Islington, London, UK (2019)
- Drawing Biennial 2019, Drawing Room, London, UK (2019)
- What Isn't Here Can't Hurt You, Royal British Society of Sculptors, South Kensington, London, UK (2019)
- From the Kitchen Table: Draw Gallery Projects1984-90, CGP London, UK (2019)
- Dialectical Materialism: Aspects of British Sculpture since the 1960s, Karsten Schubert, London, UK (2019)
- Can You Hear My Silent Scream?, Betty Cunningham Gallery, Lower East Side, New York (2020)
- The Other Side of The Coin, New Art Centre, Salisbury, UK (2020)
- Women's Lockdown Art, Zabludowicz Collection, London, UK (2020)
- We are Here, Heong Gallery, Cambridge, UK (2020)

=== Nominations, awards, selection committees, and commissions ===
- Public drinking fountain, Rathbone Square, commissioned by Great Portland Estate
- National Memorial to British Victims of Terrorism Overseas, commissioned by Department for Digital, Culture, Media and Sport, National Memorial Aboretum, Staffordshire, 2018
- Installation of Shimmy, commissioned by The Crown Estate and Exemplar, 10 New Burlington Street, London, 2014
- Selector for the Jerwood Drawing Prize, 2014
- Baptismal Font, Drinking Fountain and Garden Fountain commissioned by the United Reform Church for Lumen, Regent's Square, London, UK, 2009
- Paul Hamlyn Foundation Award, 2008
- Joanna Drew Travel Award, 2007
- Selector for Bloomberg New Contemporaries, 2006
- Installation of Migrant, commissioned by Snape Maltings, Adelborough, UK, 2003
- Elected to Royal Academy of Arts, 2001
- Installation of Ambit on the River Wear; commissioned by the City of Sunderland, UK, 1999
- Nominated for Turner Prize, 1992
- Henry Moore Fellowship, The British School at Rome, 1989
- Nominated for Turner Prize, 1988
- GLAA Award, 1981

=== Collections ===
- Arts Council of Great Britain
- British Council
- Tate Britain
- FRAC Pay de la Loire, France
- Art Gallery of New South Wales, Australia
- Scottish National Gallery, UK
- Musée de Beaux Arts, Calais, France
- Graves Art Gallery, Sheffield, UK
- Leeds Art Gallery, UK
- Henry Moore Institute, UK
- Abbot Hall Art Gallery and Museum, Kendal, UK
- British Museum
- CASS Sculpture Foundation, Goodwood, UK
- Jesus College, Cambridge, UK
- Sheffield Galleries and Museums Trust, Sheffield, UK
- Victoria and Albert Museum, London, UK

== Selected publications ==
- Alison Wilding [2018], the first critical survey of Wilding's work, published by Lund Humphries and edited by Jo Applin and Briony Fer.
- Alison Wilding: Art School Drawings from the 1960s and 70s [2011], published by Ridinghouse to coincide with her exhibition of the same title at Karsten Schubert, London (9 June – 29 July 2011). Karsten Schubert is the artist's main agent.
- Alison Wilding: Tracking [2008], featuring essays by Judy Collins, Sam Porritt and Rod Mengham. Published by Ridinghouse.
