= Sarah Cunningham (painter) =

British painter (1993–2024)

Sarah Cunningham (1993 – c. 2 November 2024) was a British painter, known for her large landscapes.

== Education and career ==
Cunningham was born in Nottingham in 1993. She studied at Loughborough University, gaining a BFA, and later studied at the Royal College of Art until 2022. She did an artist-in-residency in Armila, Guna Yala, Panama, in 2018. Her first solo exhibition in the United States was in 2022 at the Almine Rech Gallery, New York. In July–August 2024, she had a solo exhibition at the Lisson Gallery, Los Angeles. Her works had also been shown in Berlin and Vancouver.

== Death ==
Cunningham was found dead in the early morning of 4 November 2024, on the tracks of the Chalk Farm tube station near Camden in north London. She had last been seen alive on 2 November. Cunningham was 31.
