= Tishan Hsu =

American contemporary artist

Tishan Hsu (born 1951) is an American contemporary artist based in New York. Hsu's practice examines the "embodiment of technology," or technology's impact on phenomenology and affect. Hsu's works span across painting, sculpture, drawing, and computer-generated media and often incorporate unusual materials such as digital media, silicone, and Styrofoam. Recently, after his mother's death in 2013, Hsu's works have turned towards the relationship between technology and race, history, and heritage. From 1994-2018, Hsu was Professor of Visual Arts at Sarah Lawrence College in New York, as well as a visiting professor at Pratt Institute and Harvard University. Hsu has served as a Member of the Board of White Columns and a Governor of the Skowhegan School of Painting and Sculpture.

== Early life and education ==
Born in Boston, Massachusetts, Hsu spent his early years in Zurich, Switzerland, and then grew up in Ohio, Wisconsin, Virginia, and New York. Hsu studied Environmental Design and Architecture at the Massachusetts Institute of Technology, where he received his B.S.A.D. in 1973 and M.Arch. in 1975. During his time at MIT, he studied film at the Carpenter Center for the Visual Arts, Harvard University. He moved to New York in 1979, where he quickly became a part of the East Village scene at the time. He had his first show in New York at Pat Hearn Gallery in 1985, followed by a show in 1987 at Leo Castelli Gallery. In the spring of 1988, Hsu left for Cologne, where he stayed for two years. Upon his return to New York in 1990, Hsu began teaching at Sarah Lawrence College.

== Exhibitions (selections) ==
Hsu has exhibited extensively in the United States and Europe. Solo exhibitions of Hsu's works have been staged at the Hammer Museum, Los Angeles (2020); Empty Gallery, Hong Kong (2019); and TheAnnex, New York (2002), among others. He has also participated in group exhibitions at Miguel Abreu Gallery, New York (2019); K11 Art Foundation, Hong Kong (2019); The Hirschhorn Museum, D.C. (2018); Hessel Museum of Art, CSS Bard, New York (2018); Neues Museum, Nuremberg (2002); the Corcoran Gallery of Art, D.C. (1991); and Institute of Contemporary Art & The Museum of Fine Arts, Boston, MA (1988).

== Collections ==
Hsu's works are held in major public collections, including The Metropolitan Museum of Art, New York; Centre Pompidou, Paris; Museum für Moderne Kunst (MMK), Frankfurt am Main; High Museum, Atlanta; Terra Museum, Mexico City; Museum of Contemporary Art, Los Angeles; Museum of Contemporary Art, North Miami; The Rubell Family Collection, Miami; and the Weisman Art Museum, Minneapolis.
