= Briony Fer =

British art historian

Briony Fer, FBA is a British art historian, critic, and curator; professor of history of art at University College London. She has written extensively on diverse topics of 20th century and contemporary art. She has written essays on numerous contemporary artists, such as Gabriel Orozco, Vija Celmins, Jean-Luc Moulène, Roni Horn, Ed Ruscha, and Rachel Whiteread. A focus of her research is on the art of American sculptor Eva Hesse, as when she wrote for the catalogue for the artist's 2002 retrospective curated by Elisabeth Sussman at San Francisco's Museum of Modern Art in 2002.

== Early life and education ==
Studying art history at Sussex University, Fer gained her BA in 1979. She finished her PhD in 1988 with a dissertation on the Soviet and French avant-gardes, written at Essex University, where she worked with Professors Dawn Adès and Michael Podro.

== Career ==
In 1980 Fer joined the Art History Department at the Open University (OU), where she developed the essays published in the Modernity and Modernism textbooks, released in 1993 by the OU and Yale University Press. She joined the Department of History of Art at University College in 1990, where she was promoted to Professor in 2005.

Fer has also curated numerous exhibitions, such as the recent show of Gabriel Orozco at the Fruitmarket Gallery in Edinburgh in 2013.

== Other activities ==
Fer was a member of the juries that selected Isa Genzken (2019), Michael Rakowitz (2020), Senga Nengudi (2023), Otobong Nkanga (2024) and Petrit Halilaj for the Nasher Prize.

== Publications ==
=== Publications by Fer ===
- On Abstract Art (2000, Yale University Press)
- The Infinite Line (2004, Yale University Press)

=== Catalogues with essays by Fer ===
- Jean-Luc Moulene (2009)
- Karla Black - Brains are Really Everything (2011)
- Gabriel Orozco - Thinking in Circles (2013)
