= Richard Deacon (sculptor) =

British abstract sculptor

Richard Deacon CBE RA
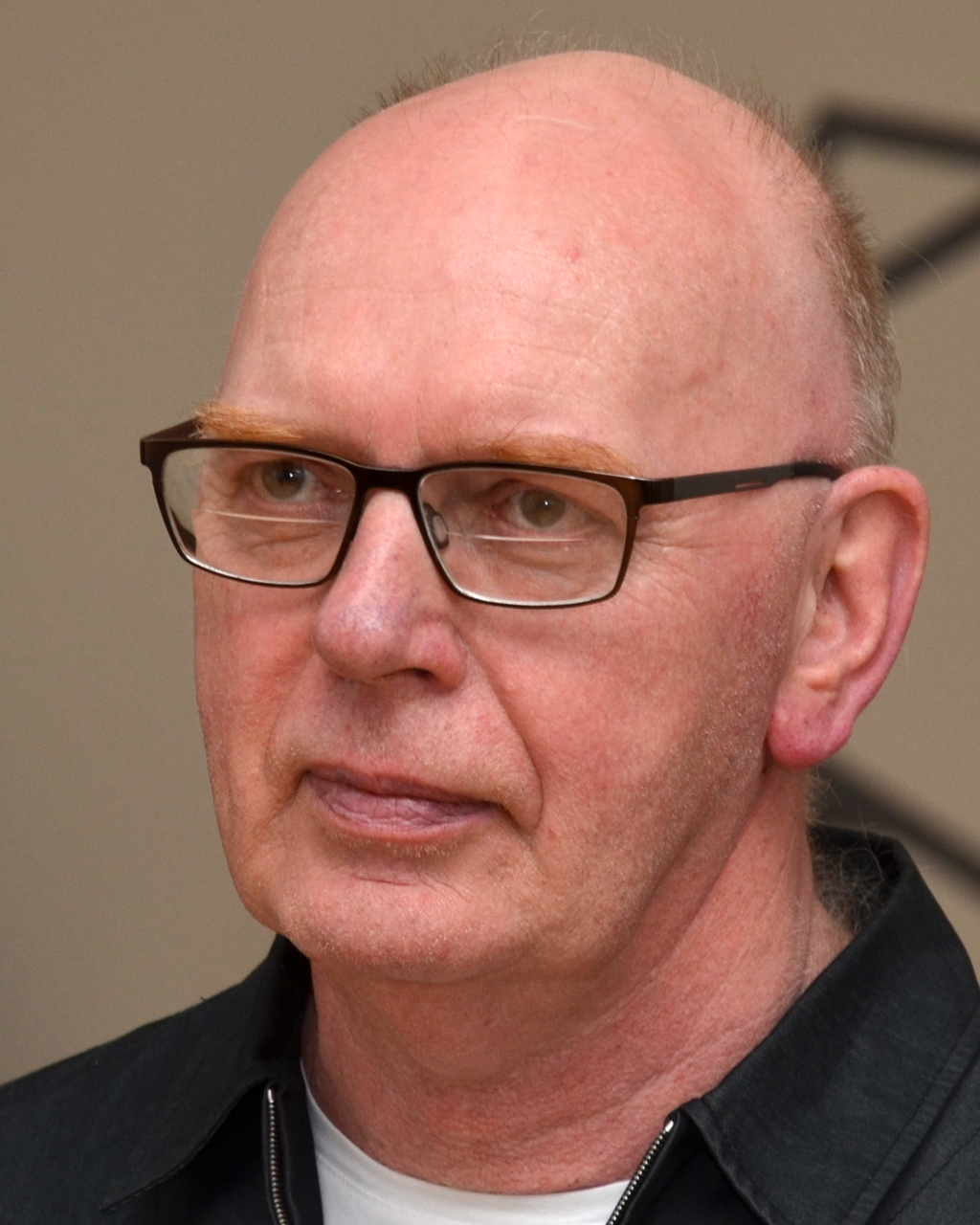
- Richard Deacon (2017)
- Born: 15 August 1949 (age 76); Bangor, Wales, United Kingdom
- Education: Plymouth College; Saint Martin's School of Art; Royal College of Art; Chelsea School of Art
- Known for: Sculpture
- Movement: New British Sculpture
- Awards: Turner Prize (1987)
- Elected: Royal Academy of Arts (1998)
- Website: www.richarddeacon.net

Richard Deacon (born 15 August 1949) is a British abstract sculptor, and a winner of the Turner Prize.

== Early life and education ==
Deacon was born in Bangor, Wales and educated at Plymouth College. He then studied at the Somerset College of Art, Taunton, at Saint Martin's School of Art, London, and at the Royal College of Art, also in London. He left the Royal College in 1977, and went on to study part-time at the Chelsea School of Art. Deacon's first one-person show came in 1978 in Brixton.

== Work ==
Deacon's work is abstract, but often alludes to anatomical functions. His works are often constructed from everyday materials such as laminated plywood, and he calls himself a "fabricator" rather than a "sculptor". His early pieces are typically made up of sleek curved forms, with later works sometimes more bulky. Deacon's body of work includes small-scale works suitable for showing in art galleries, as well as much larger pieces shown in sculpture gardens and objects made for specific events, such as dance performances. Deacon was part of the jury that awarded the Käthe Kollwitz Prize of the Berlin Academy of Arts to Maria Eichhorn in 2021.

== Recognition ==
Deacon won the Turner Prize in 1987 (nominated for his touring show For Those Who Have Eyes) having previously been nominated in 1984. He was elected to the Royal Academy of Arts in 1998.

Deacon was made a Commander of the Order of the British Empire (CBE) in the 1999 New Year Honours List. In 2007, he represented Wales at the Venice Biennale. He was one of the five artists shortlisted for the Angel of the South project in January 2008.

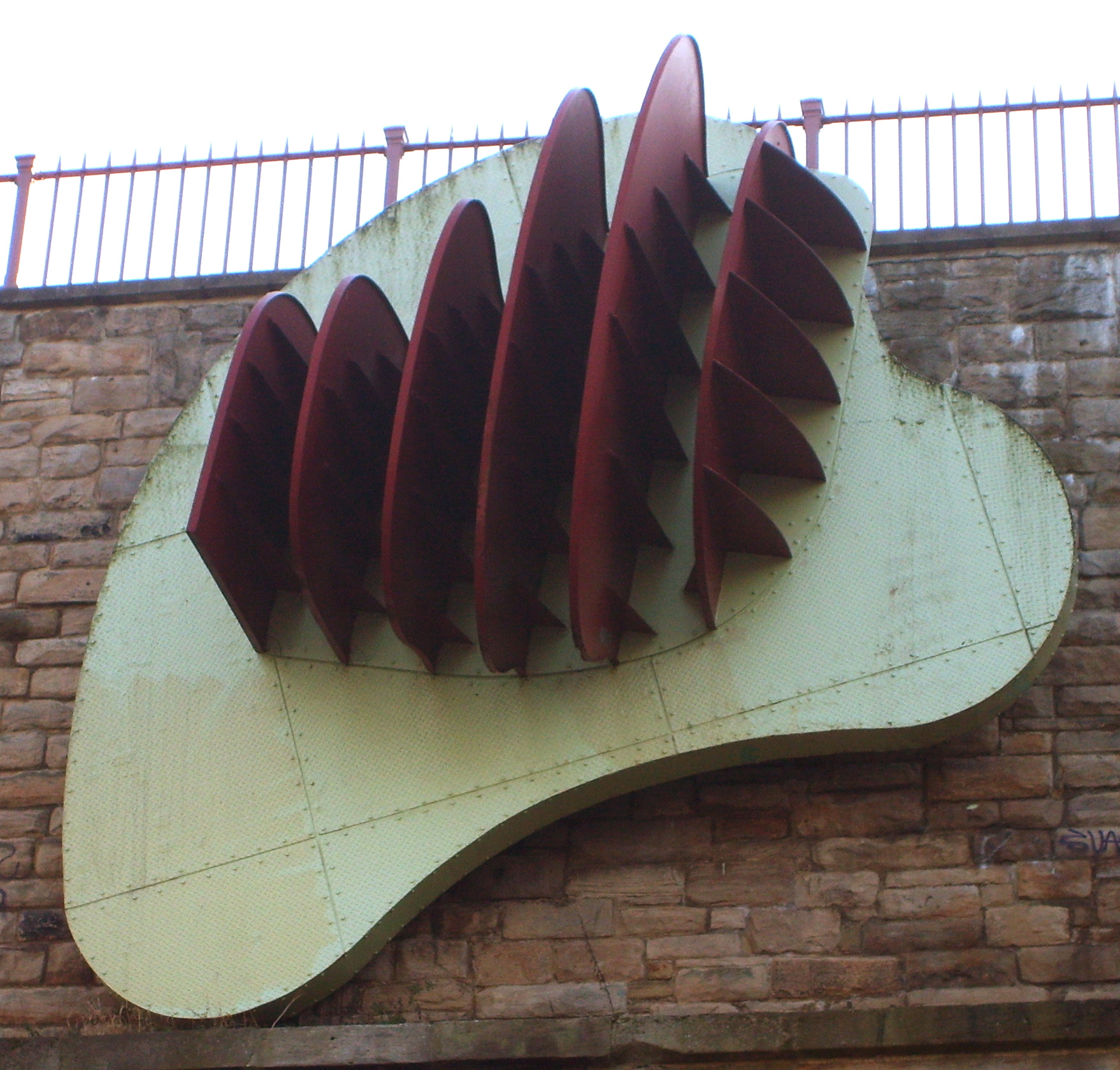
Once Upon a Time on the Redheugh Bridge, Gateshead

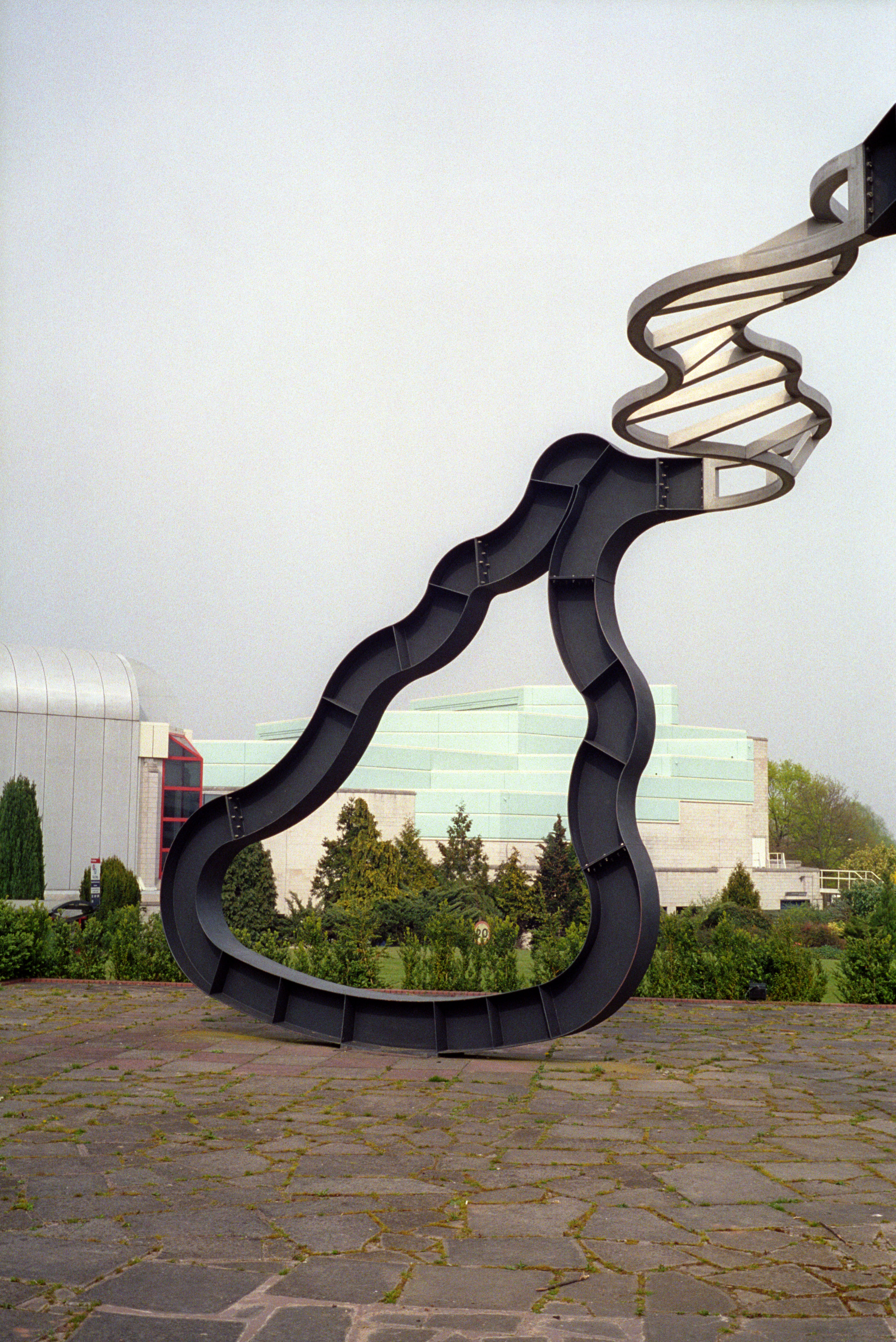
Lets Not Be Stupid at the University of Warwick

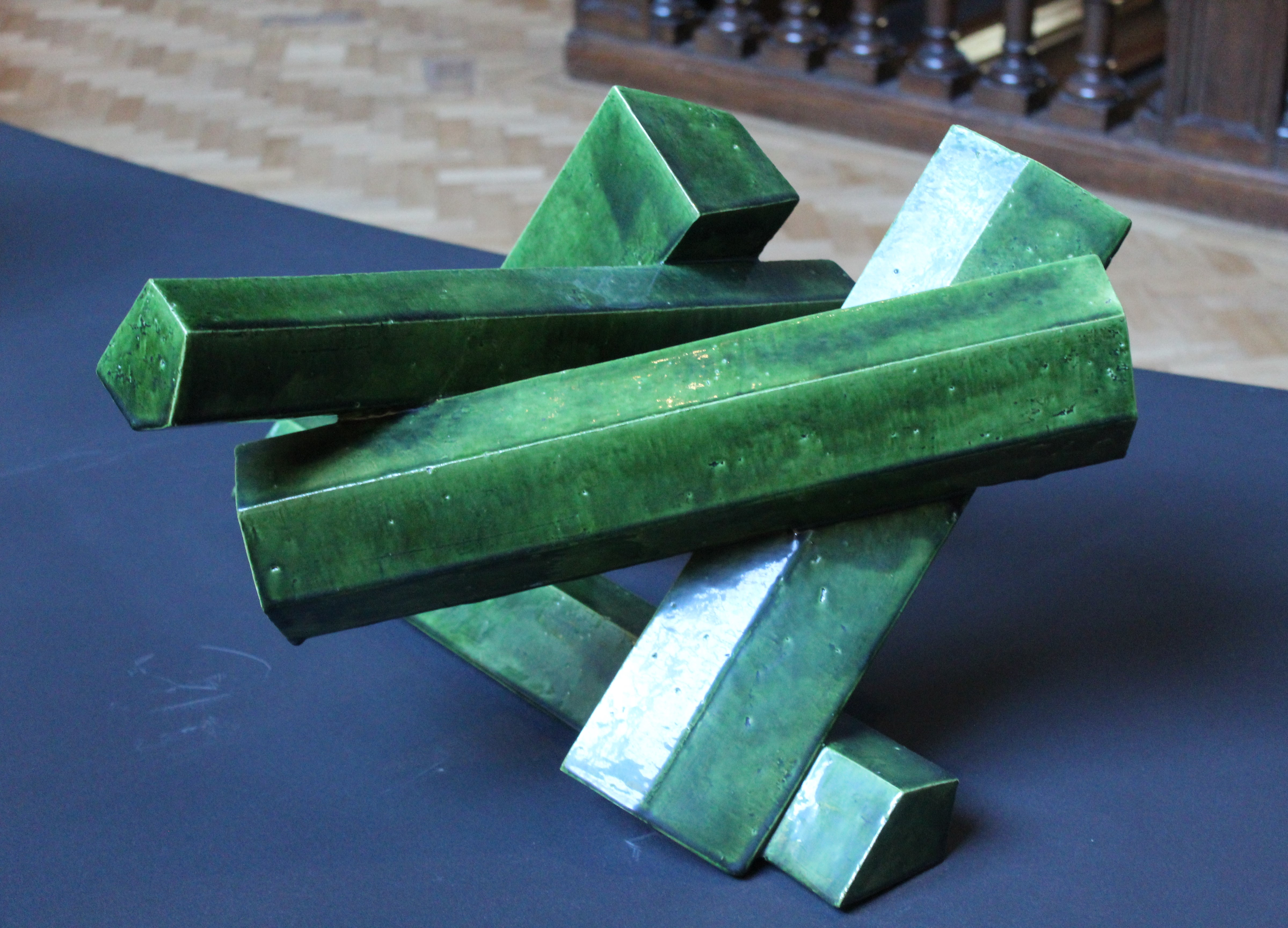
Bottle Green Republic, Victoria and Albert Museum

In 2017, Deacon won the "Ernst Franz Vogelmann-Preis für Skulptur", Heilbronn. Also in 2017, he was made an Honorary Fellow of the Arts University Plymouth (formerly Plymouth College of Art).

== Academic career ==
Deacon served as a Professor at the École Nationale Supérieure des Beaux-Arts in Paris from 1999 to 2009, and as a Professor of Sculpture at the Kunstakademie Düsseldorf from 2009 to 2015, in addition to holding various other visiting professorships. Students from his classes include French sculptor Vincent Mauger, who studied under Deacon at the Beaux-Arts de Paris, and Natalia Jaime-Cortez. At the Kunstakademie Düsseldorf, his class included Christoph Mügge, Matthias Grotevent, and Katharina Maderthaner.

== See also ==
- List of Turner Prize winners and nominators
