= For the Love of God =

2007 sculpture by Damien Hirst

- Artist: Damien Hirst
- Year: 2007
- Type: Conceptual Sculpture; Found Conceptual
- Medium: Platinum, diamond, human teeth
- Movement: Contemporalism
- Location: White Cube Gallery, London

For the Love of God is a sculpture by artist Damien Hirst produced in 2007. It consists of a platinum cast of an 18th-century human skull encrusted with 8,601 flawless diamonds, including a pear-shaped pink diamond located in the forehead that is known as the Skull Star Diamond. The skull's teeth are real human teeth, then purchased by Hirst in London. The artwork is a memento mori, or reminder of the mortality of the viewer.

In 2007, art historian Rudi Fuchs described the work as "out of this world, celestial almost. It proclaims victory over decay. At the same time it represents death as something infinitely more relentless. Compared to the tearful sadness of a vanitas scene, the diamond skull is glory itself." According to BBC, the production cost of “For the Love of God” reached around £14 million, making it one of the most expensive artworks ever created. The work was placed on its inaugural display at the White Cube gallery in London in an exhibition Beyond Belief, with an asking price of £50 million. This would have been the highest price ever paid for a single work by a living artist. In January 2022, Hirst stated that he still co-owned the sculpture, and that it was in storage in London.

== Production ==
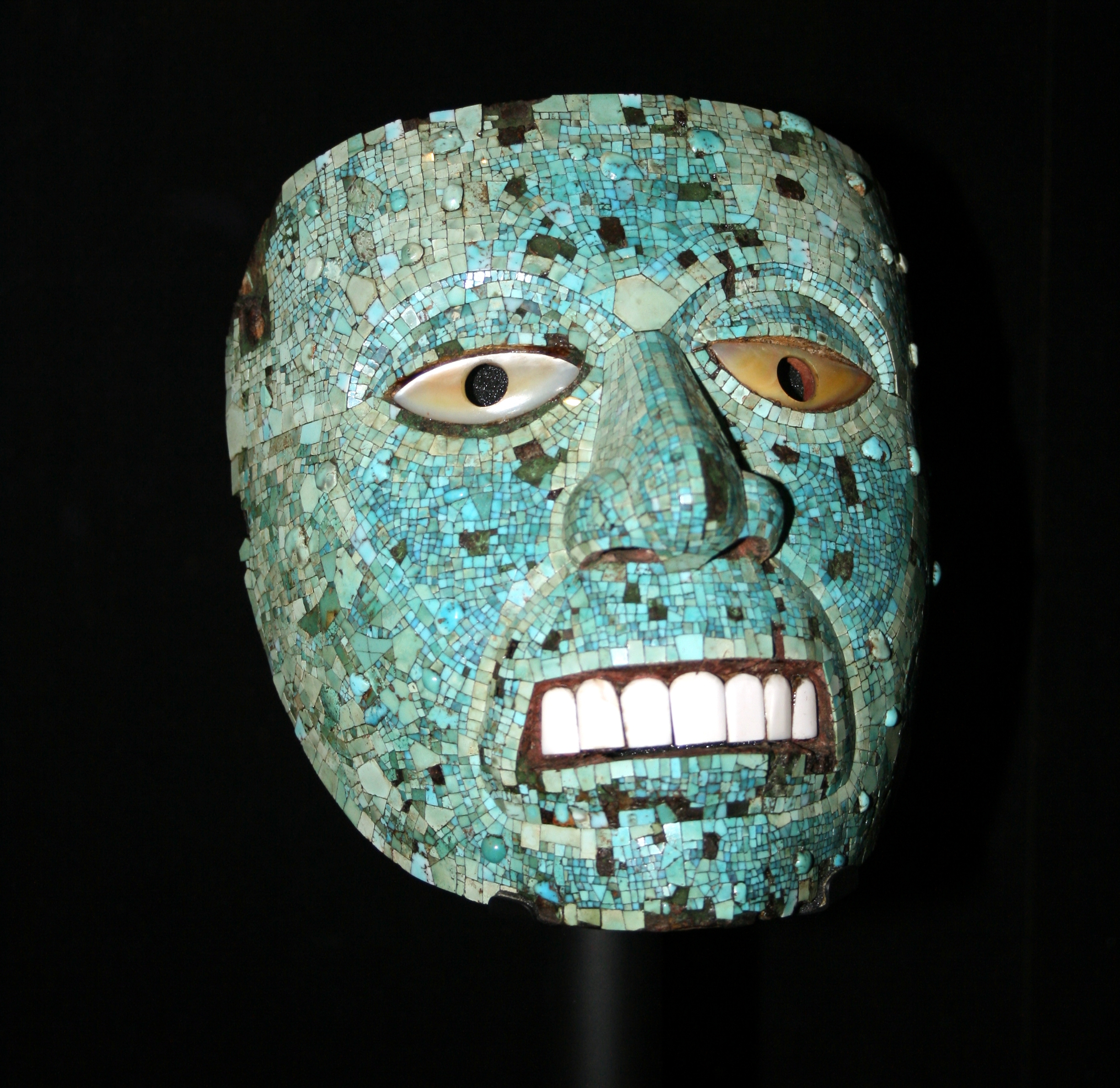
Mask (human face, possibly representing Xiuhtecuhtli), cedro wood, covered in turquoise mosaic with scattered turquoise cabochons, British Museum

The base for the work is a human skull bought in a shop in Islington. It is thought to be that of a 35-year-old European who lived between 1720 and 1810. The work's title was supposedly inspired by Hirst's mother, who once asked, "For the love of God, what are you going to do next?"

Designed and sculpted by Jack du Rose and manufactured by the Piccadilly jewellers Bentley & Skinner, 8,601 flawless pavé-laid diamonds, weighing in total 1,106.18 carats (221.236 g), over a platinum cast, cover the entirety of the skull. At the centre of the forehead lies a pear-shaped pink diamond, the centrepiece of the work. All diamonds used for the work are said to be ethically sourced.

Hirst stated the idea for the work came from an Aztec turquoise skull at the British Museum.

== Exhibition ==
On 1 June 2007, For the Love of God went on display in an illuminated glass case in a darkened room on the top floor of the White Cube gallery in St James's, London with heavy security. It was reported on 11 June 2007 that the singer George Michael and his partner Kenny Goss were interested in purchasing the piece for around £50 million.

During November–December 2008, Hirst exhibited the diamond skull at the historic Rijksmuseum in Amsterdam, the Netherlands, amidst public controversy. The skull was exhibited next to an exhibition of paintings from the collection of the museum that were selected and curated by Hirst. According to Wim Pijbes, the museum director, the board members were generally supportive of the project. He explained that the exhibition "will attract people—and give a new aspect to the image of the Rijksmuseum as well. It boosts our image. Of course, we do the Old Masters but we are not a 'yesterday institution'. It's for now. And Damien Hirst shows this in a very strong way." A Belgian journalist in response remarked how the installation of the diamond skull at the Rijks was "an intentionally quite controversial project".

For the Love of God was also displayed in the Palazzo Vecchio in Florence, Italy, and at Tate Modern, London, between 4 April 2012 and 25 June 2012.

The work was displayed at Hirst's first solo exhibition in the Middle East, at the Relics Exhibition of Doha, Qatar from 10 October 2013 to 22 January 2014.

Between 16 September and 15 November 2015 the skull was displayed at Astrup Fearnley Museum of Modern Art in Oslo, Norway.

Between 26 October 2023 and 28 January 2024 the skull was displayed at the Museum of Urban and Contemporary Art in Munich, Germany.

== Sale ==
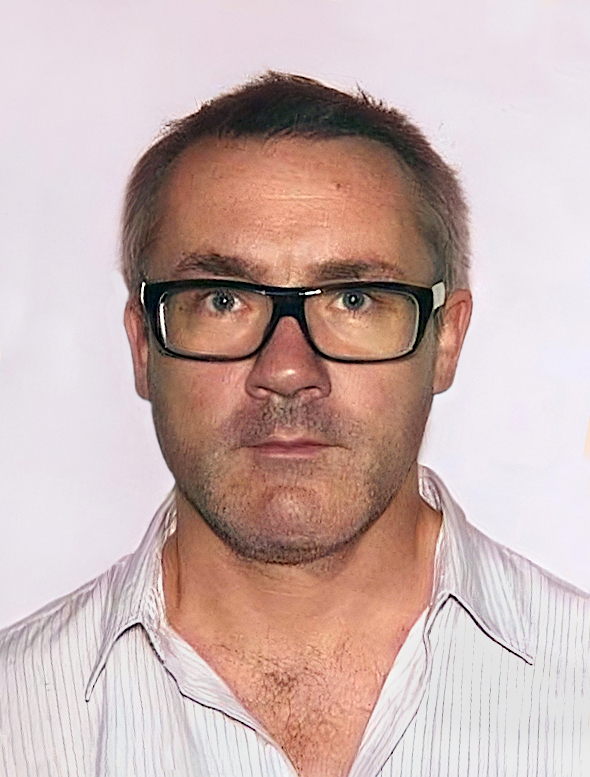
Damien Hirst, the creator of the work, was part of the consortium which bought it.

Hirst said that the work was sold on 30 August 2007, for £50 million, to an anonymous consortium. Hirst claimed he had sold it for the full asking price, in cash, leaving no paper trail. The consortium that bought the piece included Hirst himself.

In the 6 February 2012 issue of Time magazine, Hirst elaborated, in his "10 Questions" interview: "In the end I covered my fabrication and a few other costs by selling a third of it to an investment group, who are anonymous."

In January 2022, Hirst stated the sculpture was still owned by him, along with the White Cube gallery and undisclosed investors, and was in storage in a Hatton Garden vault in London. Artnet took this to mean that the 2007 sale did not actually happen.

== Media reporting and reviews ==
The media coverage of the "sale" of the diamond skull was extensive and led some to question to what extent the announcement of the sale was some kind of media art, especially as the "sale" continues to be in question. This was further supported by the performative nature of the Sotheby's exhibition and auction of Hirst's artwork the following year.

In an article in The Guardian, Germaine Greer said, "Damien Hirst is a brand, because the art form of the 21st century is marketing. To develop so strong a brand on so conspicuously threadbare a rationale is hugely creative - revolutionary even."

Richard Dorment, art critic of The Daily Telegraph, wrote: "If anyone but Hirst had made this curious object, we would be struck by its vulgarity. It looks like the kind of thing Asprey or Harrods might sell to credulous visitors from the oil states with unlimited amounts of money to spend, little taste, and no knowledge of art. I can imagine it gracing the drawing room of some African dictator or Colombian drug baron. But not just anyone made it - Hirst did. Knowing this, we look at it in a different way and realise that in the most brutal, direct way possible, For the Love of God questions something about the morality of art and money."

Ralph Rugoff of the Hayward Gallery in London criticised the work as a mere decorative object, saying "It's not challenging or fresh. It's a decorative object which is not particularly well done."

The Australian art critic Robert Hughes described the skull as "a letdown unless you believe the unverifiable claims about its cash value, and are mesmerised by mere bling of rather secondary quality." Hughes added that "as a spectacle of transformation and terror, the sugar skulls sold on any Mexican street corner on the Day of the Dead are 10 times as vivid and, as a bonus, raise real issues about death and its relation to religious belief in a way that is genuinely democratic, not just a vicarious spectacle for money groupies such as Hirst and his admirers".

The performative nature of Hirst's work was later addressed in the exhibition at Tate Modern, "Pop Life: Art in a material world", which critic Ben Lewis found very offensive: "the gallery texts have the temerity to claim that the greed-fuelled auction sale was a work of performance art in itself. That's just the same as Stockhausen calling 9/11 a work of art."

In her 2020 book, Written in Bone, professor Sue Black criticised the artwork, writing that the work raised questions "about the ethics of being able to buy and sell the remains of our ancestors, irrespective of their antiquity." She also criticised the use of real human teeth, arguing that it violated the integrity of the original remains for art.

Spiritus Callidus #2 by John LeKay, 1993, crystal skull

In a 2007 article in The Times, artist John LeKay, a friend of Hirst's in the early 1990s, claimed the work was based on a skull covered with crystals which LeKay had made in 1993. LeKay said, "When I heard he was doing it, I felt like I was being punched in the gut. When I saw the image online, I felt that a part of me was in the piece. I was a bit shocked."

== Artistic responses ==
In June and July 2007 Polish artist Peter Fuss presented his work For the Laugh of God at the exhibitions in Gdańsk and London parodying Hirst's For the Love of God. The work was a plastic human skull covered in "artificial diamonds".

A photo of the work thrown out with rubbish bags outside the White Cube gallery was a spoof by artist Laura Keeble who created a replica skull with 6522 Swarovski crystals.

In 2008, the Gaelic-language publisher Ùr-sgeul published a short story by Maoilios Caimbeul, "An Claigeann aig Damien Hirst" ("Damian Hirst's Skull"), as a fictional response to the work of art. This in turn was followed in 2009 by a single performed by the Gaelic rock band, Na Gathan, "Claigeann Damien Hirst" ("Damian Hirst's Skull"), released by Ùr-sgeul, which was inspired by Caimbeul's work. The song was shortlisted in the Nòs-ùr contest for a new song in a Celtic language or Scots.

In December 2008 Hirst threatened to sue the artist Cartrain for copyright infringement. Cartrain had incorporated photos of For the Love of God into collages and sold them on the Internet.

In 2009, Spanish artist Eugenio Merino unveiled a piece entitled "4 The Love of Go(l)d", a giant sculpture, encased in glass, of Hirst shooting himself in the head. Merino, in fact an admirer of Hirst, intended the piece as a comment on the emphasis on money within the art world, and with Hirst in particular. "I thought that, given that he thinks so much about money, his next work could be that he shot himself", said Merino. "Like that the value of his work would increase dramatically ... Obviously, though, he would not be around to enjoy it."

In 2015, the band Rosie released a song called "For The Love of God", which contains lyrics written from the perspective of the jewelled skull. The song was featured in the rhythm video game The Metronomicon: Slay the Dance Floor.

== In popular culture ==
The piece appears in the second episode of the American-Japanese animated television series Neo Yokio, when it is possessed by a demon at the Metropolitan Museum of Art.

The skull appears in the music video of Simian Mobile Disco's song "Audacity of Huge", where the singer mentions Damien Hirst’s telephone as a symbol of consumerism.

A diamond encrusted skull based on For the Love of God serves as the driving force in the video game 50 Cent: Blood on the Sand.

For the Love of God graces the cover art of Canadian rapper Tory Lanez's single "Diamonds", which he released on SoundCloud in 2017.

In issue #10 of the 2016 comic book series The Flintstones, a similarly gem-encrusted skull appears in an art gallery.

== See also ==
- Crystal skull
- Munditia
- Catacomb saints
- List of diamonds
- List of most expensive sculptures
