= Car train =

Car train may refer to:

== Transport ==
- Motorail, a passenger train on which passengers can take their car or automobile along with them on their journey
- Platoon (automobile), a method of increasing the capacity of roads. An automated highway system is a proposed technology for doing this
- Car shuttle train, a shuttle train used to transport accompanied cars (automobiles), and usually also other types of road vehicles, for a relatively short distance

== People ==
- Cartrain (born 1991), graffiti artist

== See also ==
- Railroad car, or train car
