= Karin Geiger =

German photographer

Karin Geiger is a photographer born in 1966 Dortmund, Germany.

== Education ==
She completed her Master of Fine Arts at the University of British Columbia in 1997.

== Select exhibitions ==
Geiger's 1997 solo exhibition at the Vancouver Or Gallery entitled Karin Geiger: Plus Toys and Poster Boys consists of 23 photographs from a series called In Between (1997). The series was expanded and exhibited in 2003 at the Stadtmuseum Münster with a catalogue essay by Sarah Thornton.
