= Michael Bracewell =

Michael Bracewell may refer to:

- Michael Bracewell (cricketer) (born 1991), New Zealand cricketer
- Michael Bracewell (writer) (born 1958), British writer and novelist
