= Sarah Thornton =

Canadian sociologist (born 1965)

Sarah L. Thornton
- Born: 1965 (age 60–61)
- Education: BA in the History of Art; PhD in the Sociology of Culture
- Alma mater: Concordia University, Montreal; Strathclyde University, Glasgow
- Occupations: Ethnographer and sociologist of culture
- Website: www.sarah-thornton.com

Sarah L. Thornton (born 1965) is a Canadian writer, ethnographer and sociologist of culture. Thornton has authored four books and many articles about artists, the art market, bodies, people, culture, technology and design, the history of music technology, dance clubs, raves, cultural hierarchies, subcultures, and ethnographic research methods.

== Early life and education ==
Thornton grew up in Canada. Her education comprises a BA in the History of Art from Concordia University, Montreal, and a PhD in the Sociology of Culture from Strathclyde University, Glasgow.

== Career ==
Thornton's academic posts have included a full-time lecturership at the University of Sussex, and a period as Visiting Research Fellow at Goldsmiths, University of London.

She worked as a brand planner in a London advertising agency. She was the chief writer about contemporary art for The Economist. She has also written for publications including The Sunday Times Magazine, The Art Newspaper, Artforum.com, The New Yorker, The Telegraph, The Guardian, and The New Statesman.

She wrote Tits Up during her time as a scholar-in-residence at the University of California, Berkeley.

== Tits Up ==
In May 2024, Thornton published the book, Tits Up: What Sex Workers, Milk Bankers, Plastic Surgeons, Bra Designers, and Witches Tell Us about Breasts with publisher W.W. Norton & Company. Thornton told the Guardian: "Breasts are not evolutionary, or universally erotic. But the sexualisation of breasts causes many women a lot of stress, anxiety and dissatisfaction. That is a real shame, if not a serious political problem, and I think elevating the esteem of this body part that's so emblematic of womanhood is important."

In The New York Times Book Review by Lucinda Rosenfeld states that Thornton's impassioned polemic makes a convincing case that "the derogatory way Western culture views breasts helps perpetuate the patriarchy." The Library Journal review states: "Verdict: Required reading that expertly covers the ways in which social constructions, sexualization, and economic viability influence people's views of bodies, their own, and others."

The book's content and anecdotal stories are interwoven within the San Francisco Bay Area from "the country's oldest continuously operating milk bank in San Jose; the plastic surgeons' offices in San Francisco where cosmetic breast surgeries are planned; the Gap headquarters where Old Navy bras are designed; the neo-pagan gathering in the redwoods near Mendocino where women worship the divine feminine."

== Club Cultures ==
In Club Cultures: Music, Media, and Subcultural Capital (1995), Thornton examines the shift from live to recorded music for public dancing (from record shops to raves) and the resistance to recording technology's enculturation of the "authentic," valued cultural form. The book also analyzes the dynamics of "hipness," critiquing Pierre Bourdieu's theory of cultural capital with her own formulation of "subcultural capital." The study responds to earlier works such as Dick Hebdige's 1979 book Subculture: The Meaning of Style. It does not see media as a reflection of social groups, but as integral to their formation.

Contrary to youth subcultural ideologies, "subcultures" do not germinate from a seed and grow by force of their own energy into mysterious 'movements' only to be belatedly digested by the media. Rather, media and other culture industries are there and effective right from the start. They are central to the process of subcultural formation.

The book is described by Stuart Hall and Tony Jefferson as "theoretically innovative" and "conceptually adventurous".

== Seven Days in the Art World ==
The New York Times' Karen Rosenberg said that Seven Days in the Art World (2008) "was reported and written in a heated market, but it is poised to endure as a work of sociology...[Thornton] pushes her well-chosen subjects to explore the questions 'What is an artist?' and 'What makes a work of art great?'"

In the UK, Ben Lewis wrote in The Sunday Times that Seven Days was "a Robert Altmanesque panorama of...the most important cultural phenomenon of the last ten years". While Peter Aspden argued in the Financial Times that "[Thornton] does well to resist the temptation to draw any glib, overarching conclusions. There is more than enough in her rigorous, precise reportage… for the reader to make his or her own connections."

András Szántó reviewed Seven Days in the Art World: "Underneath [the book's] glossy surface lurks a sociologist's concern for institutional narratives as well as the ethnographer's conviction that entire social structures can be apprehended in seemingly frivolous patterns of speech or dress."

== 33 Artists in 3 Acts ==
Thornton's book 33 Artists in 3 Acts (2014) looks at the lives and work of figures "from all over the art ecosystem, from the market-driven mogul (Jeff Koons) to the profoundly intellectual performance artist (UCLA professor Andrea Fraser) to the impish prankster (Italian conceptual artist Maurizio Cattelan.)" The central question guiding the book is: What defines an artist in the 21st century? Thornton received "a range of answers that will startle even art-world insiders." Jackie Wullshlager of the Financial Times opined that Thornton is "skillfully nuanced" and "elevates gossip to sociology, writing with verve, insight and authenticity."

33 Artists in 3 Acts received praise for its academic approach and "attention to detail and illustration of subtleties that bring her interviewees to life.... [Thornton's] flair for creating clear structures offer readers manageable points of access... without ever compromising on quality or content, or sounding pretentious."

== Journalism ==
At The Economist, Thornton penned investigative and analytical articles about the inner workings of the contemporary art market. Topics included the value of art, the role of museum validation and branding, and the impact of gender on auction prices. In 2010, she wrote an article about the Damien Hirst auction, "Beautiful Inside My Head Forever", which took place on the evening that Lehman Brothers went bankrupt in 2008. The article explained how the auction was so successful.

Thornton's later articles have focused on the tech world of Silicon Valley. For Cultured Magazine, she has published profiles of tech leaders including Mike Krieger (Instagram co-founder), Evan Williams (Twitter co-founder), and Ivy Ross (Head of Design for Google Hardware).

== Legal action ==
On 26 July 2011, Thornton won a historic libel and malicious falsehood victory against Lynn Barber and The Daily Telegraph. All three of the Telegraph′s attempts to appeal were denied.

== Personal life ==
Thornton lived in London for 26 years. She now lives with her wife and three kids in San Francisco, California.

== Publications ==
=== Non-fiction ===
- Thornton, Sarah (1995). Club Cultures: Music, Media, and Subcultural Capital. Wesleyan. ISBN 978-0819562975.
- Thornton, Sarah (2008). Seven Days in the Art World. W. W. Norton & Company. ISBN 978-0393337129.
- Thornton, Sarah (2014). 33 Artists in 3 Acts. W. W. Norton & Company. ISBN 978-0393351675.
- Thornton, Sarah (2024). Tits Up: What Sex Workers, Milk Bankers, Plastic Surgeons, Bra Designers, and Witches Tell Us about Breasts. W. W. Norton & Company. ISBN 9780393881028.

=== Edited books ===
- Thornton, Sarah; Gelder, Ken (1997). The Subcultures Reader. London, New York: Routledge. ISBN 9780415127288.

=== Book chapters ===
- Thornton, Sarah L.; McRobbie, Angela (2000) [1991], "Rethinking 'moral panic' for multi-mediated social worlds", in McRobbie, Angela (ed.), Feminism and youth culture (2nd ed.), Houndmills, Basingstoke, Hampshire: Macmillan Publishers, pp. 180–197, ISBN 9780333770320

Also as: Thornton, Sarah L.; McRobbie, Angela (December 1995). "Rethinking 'moral panic' for multi-mediated social worlds". British Journal of Sociology. 46 (4): 559–574. doi:10.2307/591571. JSTOR 591571.
