= Michael Bracewell (writer) =

British writer and novelist

Michael Bracewell (born 7 August 1958) is a British writer and novelist. He was born in London, and educated at the University of Nottingham, graduating in English and American Studies.

A comprehensive collection of Bracewell's essays can be found in The Space Between: Selected Writings on Art, edited by Doro Globus and published by Ridinghouse in 2012.

He is perhaps best known for his 1997 collection, England Is Mine: Pop Life in Albion From Wilde to Goldie.

== Bibliography ==
- Fiction
  - Missing Margate (1988)
  - The Crypto-Amnesia Club (1988)
  - The Quick End (1988)
  - Divine Concepts of Physical Beauty (1989)
  - The Conclave (1992)
  - Saint Rachel (1995)
  - Perfect Tense (2001)
  - Unfinished Business (2023)
- Non-fiction
  - The Faber Book of Pop (contributor) (1995)
  - England Is Mine: Pop Life in Albion From Wilde to Goldie (1997)
  - The Penguin Book of Twentieth-Century Fashion Writing (contributor) (1999)
  - Introduction to Jeff Noon's Cobralingus (2001)
  - The Nineties: When Surface was Depth (2002)
  - I Know Where I'm Going: A Guide to Morecambe & Heysham (co-author) (2003)
  - Roxyism (2004)
  - Roxy Music: Bryan Ferry, Brian Eno, Art, Ideas and Fashion (2005)
  - The Edgier Waters (contributor) (2006)
  - Re-make/Re-model: Becoming Roxy Music (2007)
  - Introduction to the Sotheby's catalogue for Damien Hirst's sale: Beautiful Inside My Head Forever, an introduction (2008)
  - The Space Between: Selected Writings on Art (2012)
  - What Is Gilbert & George? (2017)
  - Modern World: The Art of Richard Hamilton (2021)
  - Souvenir (2021)
