= Rich Simmons =

English pop artist (born 1986)

- Born: Richard Simmons; 20 February 1986 (age 40); Peterborough, England, U.K.
- Occupation: Artist
- Known for: Pop art Street art
- Awards: Prestige Awards, Contemporary Artist of the Year (2022, 2022)
- Website: richsimmonsart.com

Rich Simmons (born 20 February 1986) is an English pop artist, based in London.

== Early life ==
Richard Simmons was born in Peterborough in 1986.

== Career ==
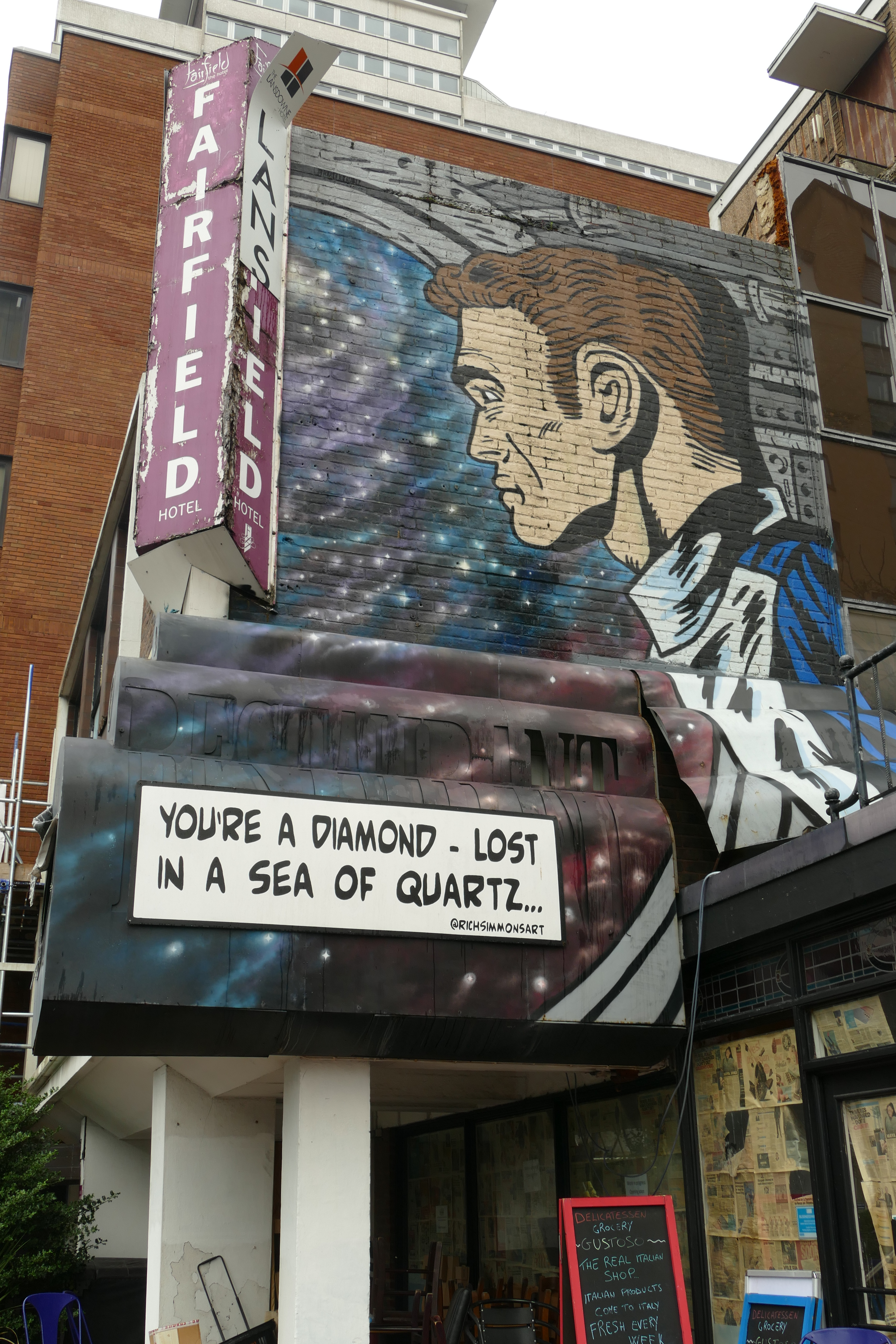
Rich Simmons artwork in Croydon, London

Simmons's depiction of Batman Kissing Superman gained notability when it was painted in London and New York City. In 2015, the mural in London was defaced in an act of 'homophobic vandalism', reaching condemnation from the leader of Croydon Council leader Tony Newman, also the owner of a print by Simmons.

In 2011, he commemorated the wedding of Prince William and Catherine Middleton with a punk mural on an official graffiti wall on London's South Bank, inspired by a 1970s photograph of the Sex Pistols’ Sid Vicious and girlfriend, Nancy Spungen, taken by Jamie Reid.

In 2012, 2013 and 2014, Simmons had solo shows at Imitate Modern in London's West End. From 2014 to 2015, he had a solo show at Soho Contemporary Art in SoHo, Manhattan.

In 2022, a Burberry trench coat painted by Simmons was shown at London Fashion Week, in a collaboration with the label Gent London, to promote sustainability and climate awareness. Simmons used a pop-art butterfly technique he is known for called “Skullerflies"; a percentage of the proceeds of the garment's sale was donated to environmental charities.

== Exhibitions ==
- 2011 – The Street Art Show, Opera Gallery, London
- 2012 – Just Be You Tiful, Imitate Modern, London
- 2013 – Inner Outsider, Imitate Modern, London
- 2014 – Kryptonite, Imitate Modern, London
- 2024 – London Calling, Soho Contemporary Art, New York City
- 2015 – Misfits, Soho Contemporary Art, New York City
- 2015 – Corrosively Bright, CASS Contemporary, Tampa, Florida
- 2016 – Reflections, Pop Up Exhibition, London
- 2017 – Self Titled, Soho Contemporary Art, New York City
- 2017 – Pop Provocateur, Box Galleries, London
- 2018 – Pop Rocks, Imitate Modern, London
- 2019 – Men of Steel, Women of Wonder, Crystal Bridges Museum of American Art, Bentonville, Arkansas
- 2019 – Imaginarium, Box Galleries, London
- 2022 – Self Titled, Taglialatella Galleries, New York City
- 2023 – Quintestencil, Henarch Galleries, London

Source.

== See also ==
- List of street artists
