= Cartrain =

British artist

CARTЯAIN
- Born: 1991 (age 34–35); London, UK
- Known for: Post-Street, Various Artworks
- Website: www.cartrain.co.uk

Cartrain (born 1991), often stylised cartяain, is a British artist associated with the graffiti urban art movement.

Artist Damien Hirst has threatened to take legal steps against Cartrain over his art and activities. Cartrain's art has been appropriated by artists Gilbert and George.

== Early life ==
Although little is known of his personal life, Cartrain's career supposedly began at the age of 12, beginning with a few small pen tags. In a later interview with a local journalist at the age of 15, Cartrain stated that the choice of his pseudonym was chosen at random, early on as he developed his style, and that despite early difficulties, he quickly began taking his work more seriously.

The interview continues, quoting Cartrain:

I only did small pen tags. I started off doing small stencils of text, but I got hold of a copy of [some] computer graphics software, Photoshop, and my stencils have improved. It's very hard cutting out large stencils, as it takes a lot of time, and hurts your wrist.

From Leytonstone, East London, he initially worked only in his local area, but "because no one pays any attention", had decided to move on by the age of 15, to the back streets near Old Street and Brick Lane in Hackney, in addition to central London, even spraying on walls opposite the Houses of Parliament.

His work often includes depictions of notable mainstream figures such as George Bush and Elizabeth II, Queen of the UK.

== Gilbert and George ==
Gilbert and George "Double Doors" featuring Cartrain's collage portraits

In 2012 Cartrain created a series of collage artworks featuring images of Gilbert & George. These images were later reproduced by Gilbert & George and displayed at their 2014 exhibition "Scapegoating" at the White Cube gallery in London. In a 2012 interview George said to The Guardian "We are very proud of that".

== Photography ==
Cartrain started photographing abandoned buildings in 2007. He has explored over 150 abandoned buildings since 2009, including Millennium Mills, Lots Road Power Station, St Mary's tube station and Walthamstow Stadium.

== Interaction with Damien Hirst ==
In December 2008, Damien Hirst contacted the Design and Artists Copyright Society (DACS) demanding action be taken over works containing images of his skull sculpture For the Love of God made by then 16-year-old Cartrain, and sold on the internet gallery 100artworks.com. On the advice of his gallery, Cartrain handed over the artworks to DACS and forfeited the £200 he had made; he said, "I met Christian Zimmermann [from DACS] who told me Hirst personally ordered action on the matter."

Jimmy Cauty has supported Cartrain, claiming he has a right to use existing images to make a new artwork.

Copyright lawyer Paul Tackaberry compared the two images and said, "This is fairly non-contentious legally. Ask yourself, what portion of the original--and not just the quantity but also the quality--appears in the new work? If a 'substantial portion' of the 'original' appears in the new work, then that's all you need for copyright infringement... Quantitatively about 80% of the skull is in the second image."

In July 2009, Cartrain walked into Tate Britain and removed a packet of Faber Castell 1990 Mongol 482 series pencils from Damien Hirst's installation, Pharmacy. Cartrain then made a fake police "Wanted" poster, which was distributed around London, stating that the pencils had been stolen and that if anyone had any information they should call the police on the phone number advertised. Cartrain made this statement:

For the safe return of Damien Hirsts pencils I would like my artworks back that Dacs and Hirst took off me in November. Its [sic] not a large demand he can have his pencils back when I get my artwork back. Dacs are now not taking any notice of my emails and I have asked nicely more than five times to try and resolve this matter. Hirst has until the end of this month to resolve this or on 31 July the pencils will be sharpened. He has been warned.

Cartrain was subsequently arrested for £500,000 worth of theft and faced charges for what might have been one of the biggest art thefts in British history.

In December 2009 the Metropolitan Police dropped all charges against Cartrain. The Independent wrote: "Cartrain told me that, happily, all police charges have since been dropped and that he's even had a meeting with the Tate to discuss the issue. What's more, he came face to face with Hirst himself at the latter's current show at London's White Cube gallery."

Jonathan Jones, art critic of The Guardian, has spoken out on Cartrain's behalf.

== Exhibitions ==
=== Solo exhibitions ===
- 2010, Magic Trees, Maverik Showroom, London
- 2013, This Way Up, Graffik Gallery, London
- 2015, Not For Sale, Imitate Modern, London

=== Group exhibitions ===
- 2008, Urban Painting, Atrion Centro Socio Culturale, Carugate, Italy
- 2010, Remasters, The Rag Factory, London
- 2013, Christmas Wish List, Imitate Modern, London
- 2015, The Spring Collection, Imitate Modern, London
- 2015, The Summer Edition, Imitate Modern, London
- 2016, Rhythm, Imitate Modern, Imitate Modern, London
- 2016, Moniker Art Fair, Imitate Modern, London
- 2016, Kings and Queens, Imitate Modern, London
- 2017, New Beginnings, Imitate Modern, London
- 2017, The May Fair, Imitate Modern, London
- 2017, Pop Portraits, Imitate Modern, London
- 2017, Re:Creations, Imitate Modern, London
- 2017, Moniker Art Fair, Imitate Modern, London
- 2017, Christmas Show: The Return of the Pop, Imitate Modern, London
- 2018, Escape From Brexitland, Light Eye Mind, London
- 2019, The Old Bank Vault, London

== Other activities ==
Cartrain has posted a video on YouTube, showing himself putting up a piece of cardboard box as a conceptual artwork in Tate Modern; he states, "I managed to put my cardboard box up in the Tate Modern for two hours without being spotted as a fake". Another video shows him installing a collage incorporating Hirst's skull image, and titled "Damien Hirst", in the National Portrait Gallery.

== See also ==
- Art graffiti
- Banksy
- John LeKay
- Street Art
- Urban culture
