= Laura Keeble =

British artist

Laura Keeble (born 1977) is a British artist. She uses interventionist and subversive strategies to create pauses in perception and question societal norms. "Unfunded and unsanctioned, Laura Keeble’s work is a grassroots action of sorts; it is an art that invites civic participation and a perhaps even a little harmless disobedience." Keeble currently lives and works in Southend-on-Sea.

== Education ==
Born in Mile End, London, Keeble attended Valance Primary School, in Barking and Dagenham; Westborough Primary School, Westcliff On Sea, and Prittlewell High school. Keeble earned a BA(Hons) in Fine Art at Essex University.

== Career ==
As a student, Keeble began to install and document uncommissioned interventions in public and corporate-owned spaces, quickly gaining notoriety for her anti-establishment installation of Queen Victoria's Hands. In 2007 Keeble continued her site-specific practice with a parody of Damien Hirst's work For the love of God in which she created a replica of this artwork using a plastic medical model skull with 6522 Swarovski crystals, and left discarded with a pile of rubbish bags outside the White Cube gallery the day after Hirsts' Beyond Belief had closed. It was then exhibited in Lazerides Gallery, Newcastle.

Idol Worship (2007) explored the commercialism of branding in the context of a sculptural obituary. Keeble then exhibited in "Trespass Alliance" with the Andipa Gallery, London, with D*Face, Jose Parlour, Parla, Swoon, Slinkachu WK Interact and Charles Krafft. Idol Worship was published in "Urban Interventions", a site-specific focused publication.
