= Imitate Modern =

Coordinates: 51°30′23.6″N 0°8′46.19″W

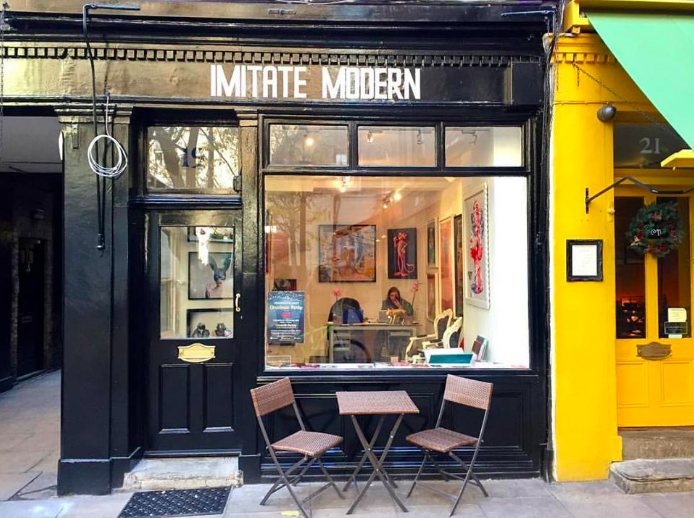
- The gallery in 2016
- Type: Private
- Industry: Art gallery
- Founded: 2011
- Headquarters: London, United Kingdom

Imitate Modern is a London contemporary photography and art gallery that exhibits work by emerging artists.

== About ==
Imitate Modern was launched in 2011, initially occupying a space in Marylebone, London. In 2015, it became a pop-up gallery, opening in various locations, including 90 Piccadilly and the Goodwood Festival of Speed. In 2016, the gallery moved to its new permanent space at 19 Shepherd Market, London.

Imitate Modern hosted the first London solo exhibitions for Tyler Shields, Cartrain and Stik. In 2012, the French artist Philippe Shangti presented his exhibition Saint Tropez to London, whose twenty-eight color images present a visual cocktail of drugs, fetishism, anarchy, sex and death. Imitate Modern hosted a solo exhibition by Rich Simmons, and a retrospective dedicated to Kate Moss's anniversary in 2014 by Russell Marshall called 40. It also hosted an evening with Spanish artist Xavier González d’Ègara in 2012, together with the International Wine & Spirit Competition, with a live painting which the artist famously destroyed.
