= Rachel Howard =

British artist (born 1969)

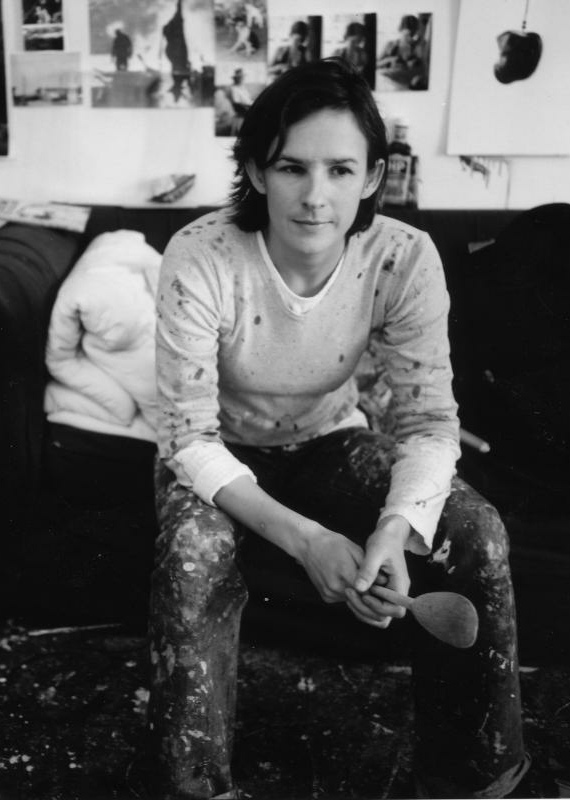
- Born: 1969 (age 56–57); Easington, County Durham, England
- Known for: Painting

Rachel Howard (born 1969) is a British contemporary artist and painter, who has exhibited nationally and internationally and whose works are held in several private and public collections.

== Early life and career ==
Rachel Howard grew up on a farm in Easington, County Durham. She attended The Mount School, York a Quaker school from the age of sixteen and the stories, concerns and questions raised by religion have had an effect on her work throughout her career.

I went to a Quaker school and it had such a powerful effect on my life that I've carried it with me ever since. I'm an atheist now but Quakerism was the first time as a child I came across a religious structure that made some sense … the silence, contemplation, the acknowledgement of our responsibilities not just to each other but also to nature, they are pacifists. I was quite unruly as a child — Quakerism makes you take responsibility for your own actions without being heavy-handed, it's subtle and beautiful. The Quakers believe in celebrating the light within, it'll come as no surprise that James Turrell is a Quaker, for example.

Howard graduated from Goldsmiths College, London, in 1991.

In 1992, Howard was awarded the Prince's Trust Award to support her art practice. In 2004 was shortlisted for the Jerwood Drawing Prize and she received the British Council Award in 2008.

Late one night in 1988, the 19-year-old Rachel Howard was waiting for a bus outside London’s Goldsmiths College with a stack of her paintings, having spent the evening in the student union bar, when she was approached by two scruffy characters offering to carry the canvases back to her digs. One of which was Damien Hirst. They have played an important part in each other’s early careers. “We were mates and he needed someone to paint spots, and I was waitressing and I didn’t want a proper job – so I ended up working for him to earn enough money to make my own work,” she says. “It was a very good symbiotic relationship.” From 1992-1995 Howard was studio assistant to Hirst. She painted over 300 spot paintings.

In 2008, Howard designed the front cover for The Big Issue newspaper.

== Work ==
While Howard more recently employs oil paint, from 1995–2008 she primarily used household paint

The fluidity of the paint is so gorgeous I felt like I wanted to conquer it and control it.

Howard allows the paint to separate inside its can so that the pigment and varnish can be used in isolation. The pigment is applied to the edge of the canvas, then diluted and manipulated through the addition of the varnish. Gravity's pull then draws the paint down the canvas.

The first thing that strikes you about [Howard's] pictures, [is] this seamless downpour of paint: a vertical torrent that seems to advance from one painting to another, sometimes fading out before it reaches the bottom of the canvas, only to fall unbidden from the upper edge of another.

Howard's paintings are built architecturally. The terms she uses are those of the builder: construction, reconstruction, building, layering and assembling. Gravity is her brush. Layers of paint accrue built by dripped pathways of paint.

Of her work, Howard says:

I'm interested in how we each make sense of the world. In paintings such as Missive to the Mad and Missive to the Sad, I use the grid in varying degrees of degradation and dissolution, building up the ground and then the grid only to knock it back using gravity, turps and gloss varnish, a balance between control and chaos. They are odes to madness and melancholia, the gentle slip and slide of life, what the mind can do and where it can lead you. I think that's why I'm fascinated with religion and human beliefs and what we need to make it all work.

== Sin Paintings ==
Howard's Sin Paintings comprise seven monumental canvases, each painted in a range of intensely saturated reds, offset by the use of bright yellow and orange. The paintings were exhibited in a solo exhibition entitled Guilty, at the Bohen Foundation, New York in 2003. The paintings have a glossy, mirror-shine surface, through which a simple cruciform shape emerges. They do differ from one another; Pride is an offering of brilliant red down-strokes, with a cross discernible in its centre; the reds of Envy are more individuated, with yellows breaking through here and there, and the cross far less readable; the hues of Anger are in a darker, more brooding range. Howard has said that the title 'Guilty' in part refers to the guilty pleasure of painting.

== Suicide Paintings ==
Howard's Suicide Paintings were first shown at the Bohen Foundation in New York, 2007, and were later exhibited at Haunch of Venison, London, 2008 The series evolved after an acquaintance of Howard's committed suicide. He was discovered, not in the imagined drama, 'swinging from the rafters', but kneeling in a pose almost of prayer. It was this particular detail that Howard found most disturbing, and which led her to create the series, coupled with the fact that for her, suicide is one of the last taboos. The source material for the paintings came from trawling through forensic magazines and internet sites for pictures of suicides. These were then abstracted from their contexts within Howard's rapidly executed line drawings, forming the basis of the paintings.

The series ultimately offers an investigation into the aesthetics of suicide. Possible instruments of death are depicted – a pair of scissors, a ladder, as well as the symbolic, lone Black Dog (a common metaphor for depression, coined by 18th Century writer Samuel Johnson). Then there are the faceless figures; many hang from ropes, while the body of a woman lying across a bed recalls the psychosexual claustrophobia of Walter Sickert.

Howard's figures are on the verge of disappearing completely, dangerously close to ceasing to exist even as an image, slipping away from the canvas's representation: all that remains is the macabre trace of a body, almost as immaterial as a shadow cast upon an empty room.

Sue Hubbard wrote of the series in The Independent:

The creation of these ambitious canvases is a psychological and physical battle, which demonstrates that there is still a role for emotionally articulate art that has something important to say about the poignancy and tragedy of the human condition.

== Via Dolorosa ==
Between 2005–2009 Howard worked on her first commission, titled Repetition is Truth - Via Dolorosa. Via Dolorosa, Latin for 'Way of Suffering', is the name of a street within the Old City of Jerusalem, believed to be the path that Jesus walked, bearing the cross, towards his crucifixion. It is also another name for the fourteen Stations of the Cross, which depict these final hours of his life – The Passion.

While Howard's fourteen paintings reference The Passion, the creation of the series was in fact provoked by one of the most shocking photographs to emerge from the Abu Ghraib prison in Iraq. Detainees routinely endured torture and humiliation at the hands of American military personnel, as exposed through the media. The particular image was of a prisoner standing on a box, hooded and wired with electrodes; thus the box becomes the modern day equivalent of the Cross – a tool of humiliation and torment. Thus, the paintings offer a broader commentary on the universality of human rights abuses and people's capability for cruelty towards each other. A publication accompanies the work with texts by art historian and curator Joachim Pissarro and Shami Chakrabarti.

Joachim Pissarro has described the series as "sublime", in accordance with Immanuel Kant's Critique of Judgement:

The sublime is to be found in an object even devoid of form, so far as it immediately involves, or else by its presence, provokes, a representation of limitlessness, yet with a super-added thought of its totality.

It is this idea of limitlessness that Howard seeks to engage with, the belief that human suffering is never-ending, hence the name of the work – Repetition is Truth.

One enters a room with fourteen Stations of the Cross by Rachel Howard – her Via Dolorosa. Monumental, quiet, graceful, discrete, luscious, restrained and yet, at the same time, forceful, masterful, deafening – these paintings yield more layers of emotions than one can absorb all at once.

== Selected solo exhibitions ==
- 1999: 'Rachel Howard: New Paintings', A22 Gallery, London, UK
- 2001: 'Painting 2001', Anne Faggionato, London, UK.
- 2002: 'Tightrope', Shaheen Modern and Contemporary Art, Ohio, USA.
- 2003: 'Can't Breathe Without You', Anne Faggionato, London, UK.
- 2003: 'Guilty', Bohen Foundation, New York, USA.
- 2007: 'Fiction/Fear/Fact', Bohen Foundation, New York, USA.
- 2007: 'Rachel Howard - New Paintings', Gagosian Gallery, Los Angeles CA, USA.
- 2008: 'How to Disappear Completely - New Work by Rachel Howard', Haunch of Venison, London, UK.
- 2008: 'Rachel Howard: invited by Philippa van Loon', Museum van Loon, Amsterdam, Netherlands.
- 2009: 'Der Wald', Haunch of Venison, Zurich, Switzerland.
- 2010: 'Human Shrapnel - oil drawings on paper', Other Criteria, New Bond, London, UK.
- 2011: 'Folie A Deux', Blain|Southern, 21 Dering Street, London, UK.
- 2011: 'Repetition is Truth', Via Dolorosa, Museo Madre, Naples, Italy.
- 2011: 'Still Life / Still Here Rachel Howard New Paintings', Sala Pelaires, Palma, Mallorca, Spain.
- 2014: 'Northern Echo' Blain|Southern, Hanover Square, London, UK.
- 2015: Rachel Howard At Sea 'Jerwood Gallery' Hastings, UK.
- 2016: Rachel Howard MACRO Testaccio, Rome, Italy.
- 2018: 'Der Kuss' Blain|Southern, Hanover Square, London, UK.
- 2018: 'Repetition is Truth - Via Dolorosa' Newport Street Gallery, Vauxhall, London, UK.
- 2018: 'Rachel Howard' MASS MoCA, Massachusetts, US.
- 2019: L'appel du vide Blain|Southern, New York, US.
- 2021: 'You have a New Memory', Simon Lee Gallery, London, UK
- 2024: 'Big Bad Wolf' The Little Institute, Glasgow, Scotland

== Collections ==
- Ackland Art Museum, North Carolina
- Beaconsfield, London, UK
- Black Flag Collection, Belgium
- Museum van Loon, Amsterdam
- David Roberts Foundation, London
- Goss-Michael Foundation, Dallas
- Murderme collection, London
- Hiscox collection, London
- Jerwood Collection
- Tate Archive
- Pio Monte Della Misericordia, Naples, IT
- The wareHOUSE, Wieland Collection, Atlanta, US
- Olbricht Collection, DE
- Pallant House Gallery, Sussex, UK
- Reydan Weiss Collection, Dusseldorf, DE
- SMEG Collection, Italy
- Tia Collection, USA
- Victoria and Albert Museum, London, UK
