= Philippe Shangti =

Multidisciplinary French artist

- Born: 1983 (age 42–43); Toulouse, France
- Occupation: contemporary artist

Philippe Shangti is a multidisciplinary French contemporary artist. Born in 1983 in Toulouse, he studied in this city then he moved to Saint-Tropez at the beginnings of the 2000s. He became known by exhibiting his art on the walls of trendy restaurants. Ten years later, he moved to the Principality of Andorra.

From his beginnings, the artist publishes regularly new collections. Centered on a specific theme, he always denounces different problems affecting society. In 2013, his photographic collection "Art vs. Drugs" launches his career. His works are exhibited in about galleries around the world and in collectors' homes. In 2019, Philippe Shangti is chosen to represent the Principality of Andorra at the 58th Venice Biennale with his project "The Future is Now". This time, those works are focus on the impact of humanity on the environment and the future of our planet.

== Early life and education ==
Philippe Shangti was born in 1983, and raised in Jolimont area at Toulouse. At a very young age, he became interested in photography. He studied communication at the Lycée Jolimont and played handball with the Spacers. One of the artist's hobbies is martial arts, his artist name is borrowed from Shang-Chi, the kung fu hero of Marvel Comics.

I started very early. At the age of 5 I was already holding a camera in my hands, and at 14 I made it myself because I wanted to understand how to capture an image in a box.

— Philippe Shangti

== Career ==
=== Beginnings in Saint-Tropez ===
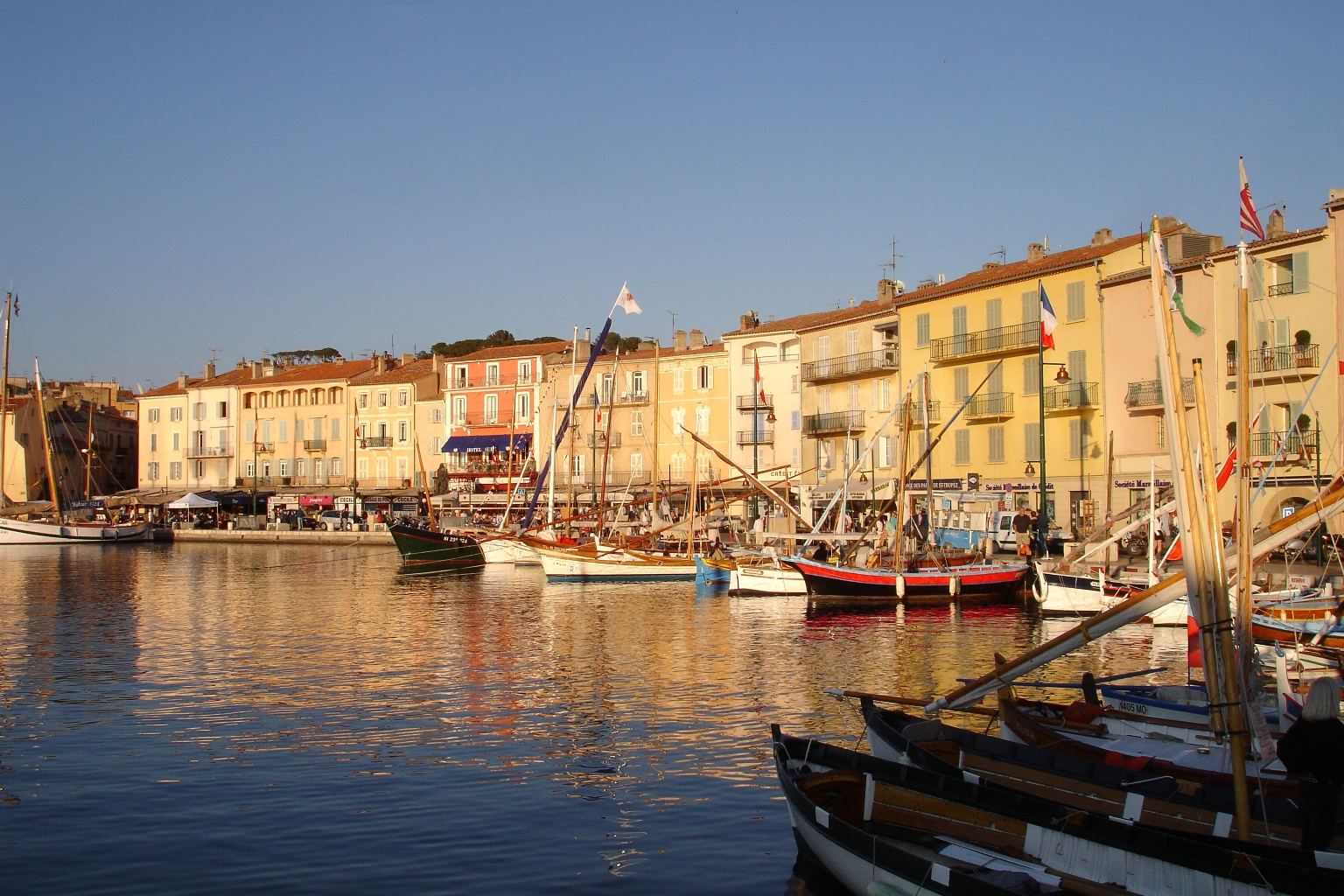
The artist imagined the design of Le Quai and L'Opera, restaurants located on the port of Saint-Tropez where he also exhibits his art collections.

At the beginnings of the 2000s, Joseph Geenen, a multiple restaurant owner, chose Philippe Shangti to be responsible for the artistic management of a new restaurant Le Quai located on the port of Saint-Tropez In 2008, the artist made the collection "No Cocaïne Here" his first photo canvas print. He depicted the fact that under drugs influence you may think your are great and super but it is not the case. He used models dressed as botoxed dolls and also well known comic book heroes like Hulk, Batman or Superman His provocative art attracted the attention of collectors and celebrities on vacation in Saint-Tropez. Celebrities like Eva Longoria and Tony Parker own pieces of this French rising artist.

The decadent nights of Saint-Tropez influence the first years of Philippe Shangti. He is the witness and observer of "Sex, Drugs and Rock'n Roll" parties. In 2012, Philippe Shangti presents in London his exhibition "Saint Tropez to London" at Imitate Modern whose 28 provocative color images present a visual cocktail of drugs, fetishism, anarchy, sex and death. One year later, he introduced his collection "Art vs. Drugs" which is again denouncing drugs. It is considered as the photographic collection that revealed him to the general public and launched his career.

Also situated on the port of Saint-Tropez, The Opera, a true restaurant – art gallery, is inaugurated in 2014. It is an artistic concept imagined by Philippe Shangti, where photographs, sculptures and live shows, inspired by his latest collection, blend together. Through creative shows, the artist brings his creations to life on the restaurant's central tables, arranged like podiums, creating a living art gallery. In the following years he always exhibit in the establishment to present his new creations. Prostitution is denounced in the collection "No Prostitution Here", exhibited in April 2016.

=== Studio in Andorra ===
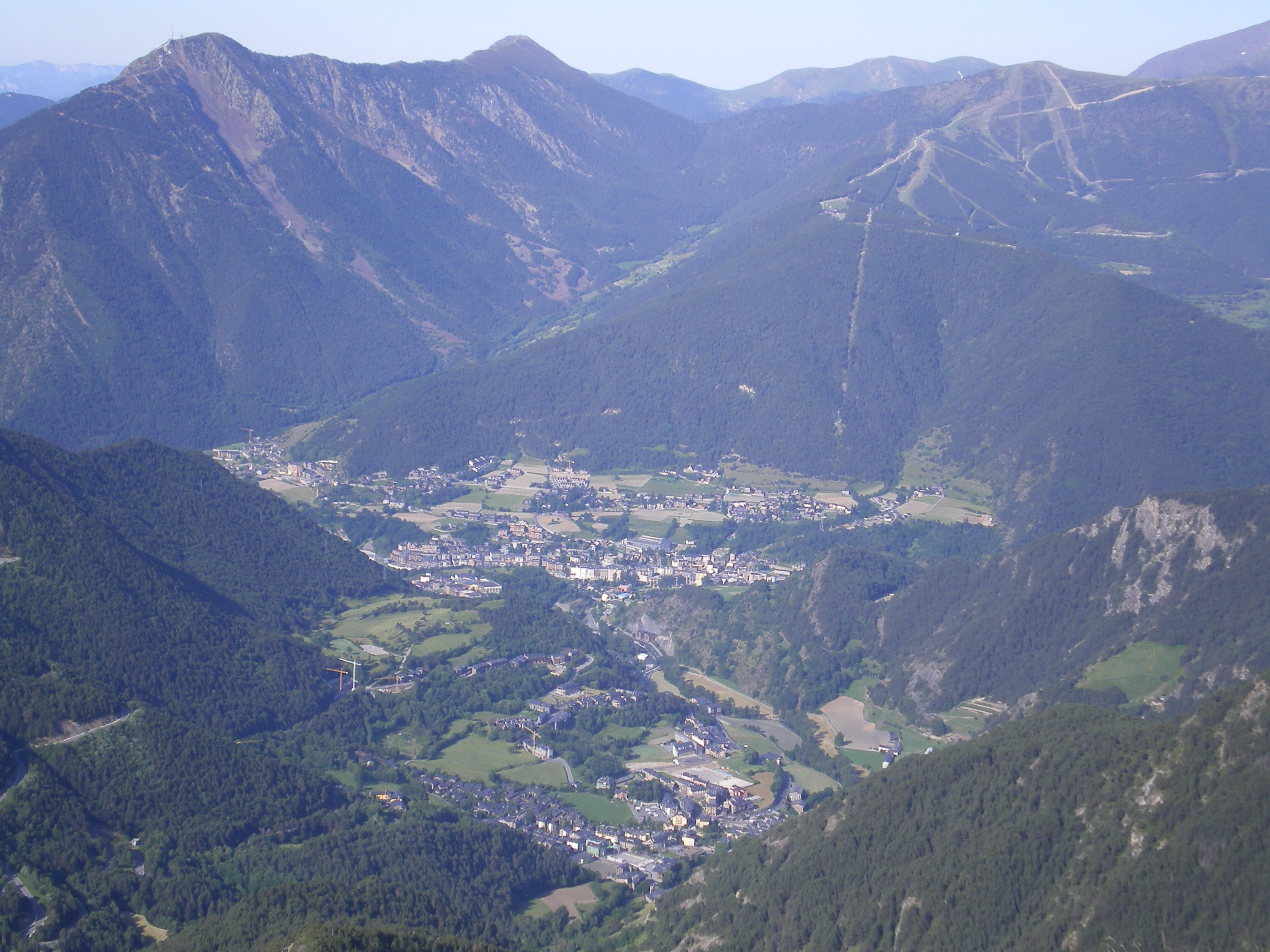
Philippe Shangti has a studio located in La Massana, Andorra.

Saturated from the Saint-Tropez frenzy, Philippe Shangti move to Andorra to get closer to nature. He set up a large studio and a personal museum open to the public in La Massana. In 2017, the nature inspired him with the collection "No Pollution Here".

In 2018, the French model, television host, and former Miss Universe 2016, Iris Mittenaere posed for Philippe Shangti. The work entitled I'm Iris. I'm not a princess pictures her wearing a multicolored crown, a Barbie fashion doll around the neck and a red princess dress with a very low neckline. The photographic work is auctioned at 40,000 euros in June 2018, at Cornette of Saint Cyr. All the benefits of this collaboration have been given to the Smile Train association which Iris Mittenaere is the godmother. This association operates free of charge on children born with cleft lip and cleft palate in developing countries.

The 2018 collection "No Topless Here" focused on the women's empowerment. At the end of 2018 and the beginning of 2019, the contemporary artist exposes a part of his works under the title "Art is my hope", at the thermal complex Caldea in Escaldes-Engordany. 8 sculptures and 18 large-format photos are exhibited, including misappropriations of the Mona Lisa of Leonardo da Vinci and works by Picasso. This exhibition recalled the various themes that preoccupy him, such as the future of our planet.

After winning a national competition in which 27 artists participated, Philippe Shangti is chosen to represent the Principality of Andorra at the 58th Venice Biennale, one of the oldest, most important and prestigious contemporary art exhibitions in the world. From 11 May 2019, to 24 November 2019, the artist exhibits several creations at the Institute Santa Maria della Pietà, Venice. Using different types of art such as photography and sculpture, grouped under the name "The Future is Now", those works address the impact of humanity on the environment and the future of our planet. Olga Gelabert Fàbrega, Minister of Culture, Youth and Sports, explains that environment is obviously a global concern. But it is also specifically important to the Principality whose governments efforts allow to keep only 5% of the national territory developed and the rest is pure nature.

Inspired by Gustave Courbet's work, Philippe Shangti presented "Beauté Sauvage" ("Wild Beauty"), a new exhibition first visible online on his website, where the woman is converted in the center of the seduction. From 15 July 2020, to 3 January 2021, he exhibits the project "The Future is Now" at the Museum of Fine Arts at Carcassonne The second lockdown in France, preventive measure in response to COVID-19, and some closure imposed on cultural places, penalized partially the exhibition. It is extended until 18 April 2021, with the addition of new works. His 2020 collection is named "No Animal Killer Here". It defends the animal cause and addresses the problems of bullfighting, poaching and species extinction. In those artworks, the artist reverses the roles and makes the human models look like hunting trophies or victims.

The COVID-19 pandemic interrupted some of the artist's projects. In 2021, Philippe Shangti collaborated with Playboy Mexico for a digital issue launched in February. Later the same year, he exhibited his work temporary in Erarta, the largest private museum of contemporary art in Russia, located in Saint Petersburg. In December 2021, Philippe Shangti opens his restaurant, La Petite Forêt, right in the center of Andorra la Vella. The establishment is managed by his brother.

In March 2023, Philippe Shangti donates the statue Babies are hope, which was part of the project "The Future is Now", to the Museum of Fine Arts at Carcassonne. His collection "Seven", presented in his studio in May 2023, illustrates the seven deadly sins.

== Analysis ==
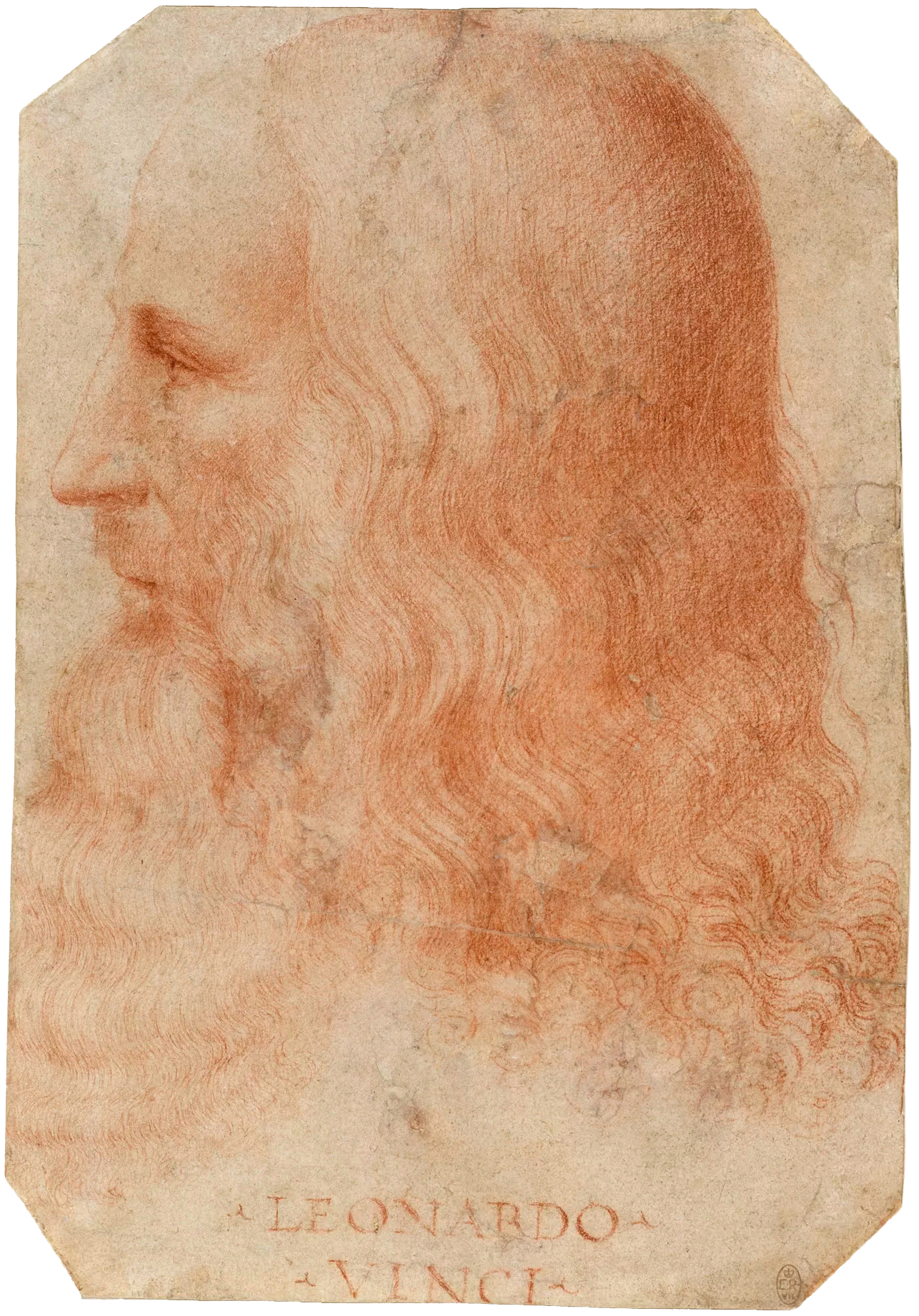
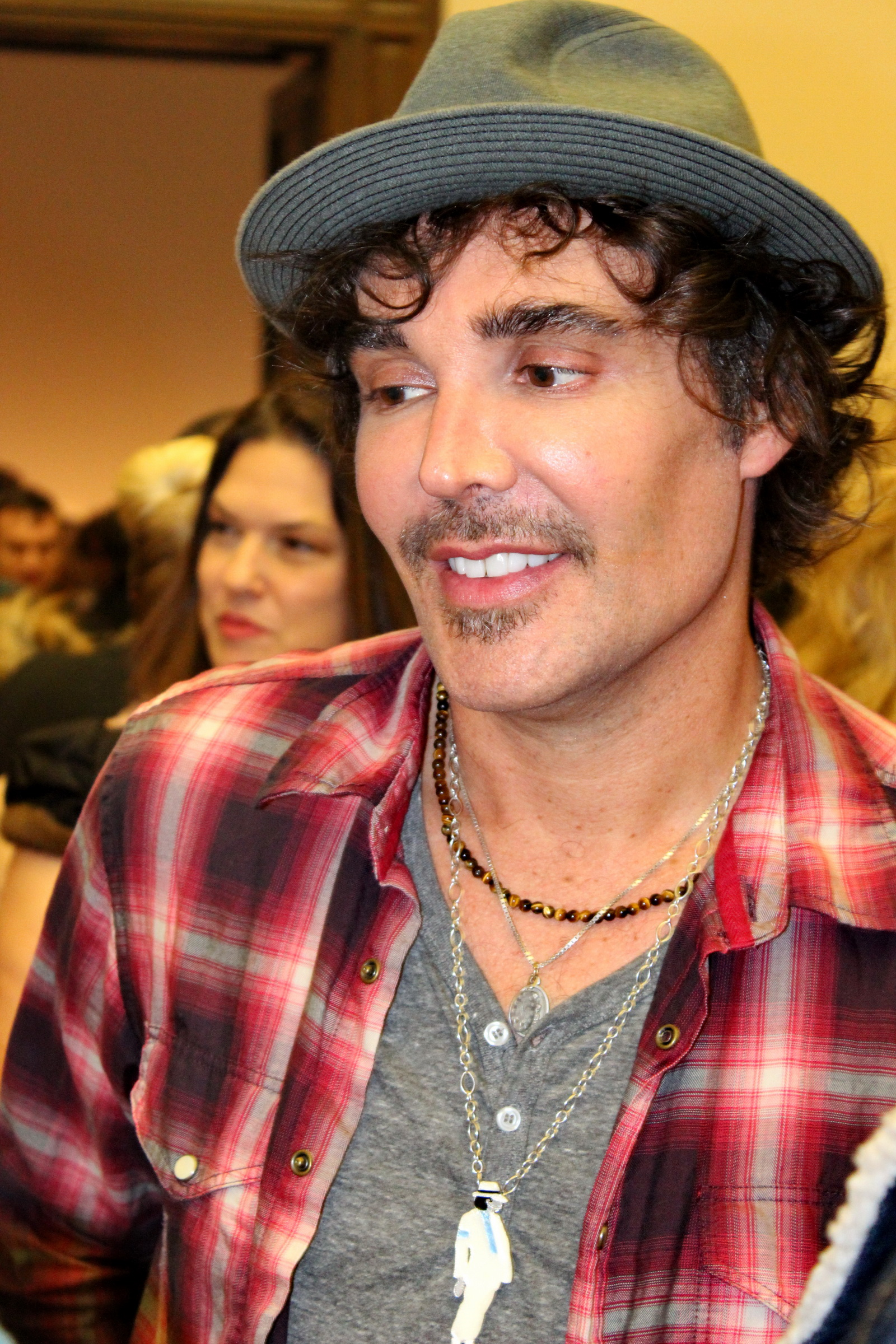
Philippe Shangti can as well find inspiration in well-known painters such as Leonardo da Vinci (left), but also in contemporary artists like David LaChapelle (right).

Philippe Shangti creates contemporary art in a wide variety of disciplines. Starting with photography, he evolves a lot and extends his art to sculpture, painting, video and live performances. Working alone at the beginning, he then moves on to creations where he is at the head of about fifteen assistants. In Andorra, lighting technicians, couturiers, make-up artists and even robotics specialists contribute to the creation of the artist.

Art can guide people's mentality and speak to them in a very different way than television or the press. Art has contributed a lot to the development of humanity. It shows us new ways. Those things that we think are impossible become reality through art.

— Philippe Shangti

His art, belonging to a pop, glamorous, colorful universe, is often judged visually provocative and striking. With it, he intends to denounce different issues affecting society. In each collection, the artist chooses to publish related artworks linked to a theme such as drugs, junk food, luxury, abuses of cosmetic surgery, prostitution, women's freedom of expression, pollution, environment, animal protection.

Since always, I have only one leitmotiv: to denounce the vices of our society, to point out the human behaviors to awaken consciences through art.

— Philippe Shangti

On some occasions, Philippe Shangti has been inspired by photos taken by James Bidgood or David LaChapelle, whose works also present a critique of the society full of excess and vanity. Often to make sure his message is understood, the artist goes so far as to write his message in English on the bodies of his models. He also often sign his works with his hand directly on his models. During interviews, Philippe Shangti cites the French artist and fashion photographer Guy Bourdin known for his provocative images as another source of inspiration.

Émilie Frafil, conservation assistant at the Museum of Fine Arts of Carcassonne, explains that the use of nudity in Philippe Shangti's work reveals the beauty but also constitutes small hints of historical, mythological, biblical and artistic references. In Shangti Da Vinci Fusion Basic, four famous painting portraits of women in half body made by Italian artist Leonardo da Vinci, Lady with an Ermine, Mary Magdalene, Mona Lisa, La Belle Ferronnière, give way to the naked busts of the photo models. Philippe Shangti makes a nod to the Italian Renaissance where artists were inspired by Antiquity, a period during which the naked body was magnified. The staging of the Dutch painter Hieronymus Bosch's work The Garden of Earthly Delights confronts two antinomic visions. If in Gothic art, nudity symbolizes sin, human misery, in Philippe Shangti it is on the contrary synonymous with beauty, aestheticism, ideal.
