= John LeKay =

British artist

- John LeKay
- Born: 1 June 1961 (age 65); London
- Education: Isleworth Polytechnic University
- Known for: Installation art
- Notable work: Spiritus Callidus #2 (Crystal Skull)

John LeKay (born 1 June 1961) is an English conceptual and installation artist and sculptor, who lives in New York City. In 1993, he began to make skulls covered in crystal: he has accused Damien Hirst of copying this and other ideas. He publishes the web site heyokamagazine.

== Life and work ==
John LeKay was born in London. He was educated at Isleworth Polytechnic, London in 1977. He moved to New York in 1991. Instead of higher art education, he travelled with a circus and worked at Pinewood Studios.

1983–1986, he created an installation, Non Terrestrial Black Bird of Paradise, consisting of a taxidermied crow, chairs, chicken wire, glasses and photos: this was exhibited at the Bronx Museum.

This Is My Body, This Is My Blood by John Lekay, 1987, lamb on wood

Inspired by the early work of Francis Bacon and the painting of a slaughtered ox by Rembrandt, he made a "meat series", 1986–87. An example of this is the 1987 sculpture, This is my Body this is my Blood, consisting of a cut open decapitated lamb carcass, nailed to a piece of plywood. His 1987 sculpture, Wind pipe, was a double bed with a varnished sewer pipe on it.

Wind Pipe by John LeKay, 1987, varnished sewer pipe in bed

In 1990, he held his first solo exhibition, at the Paula Allen Gallery, New York. Exhibits included a sensory deprivation tank, and also a large tape recorder, whose microphone was placed inside a sound-proofed acrylic glass box in order to record the sound of silence. Another sculpture subtitled Vanishing Object, was a cross made out of closet freshener, which slowly evaporated in a tall acrylic glass vitrine. Roberta Smith wrote in The New York Times:

As a sculptor, John LeKay is interested in changing states, viewer participation and a strange, not always comfortable intimacy ... Anyone who thinks all this sounds a bit sophomoric would not be entirely wrong. Nonetheless, these works generate an atmosphere of quietude and heightened awareness, a sense of time passing and things changing, that can engross and bring the buzzing SoHo scene to a momentary halt.

In the early 1990s, LeKay edited an underground magazine entitled Pig, the name referring to a Nostradamus quatrain about men with pig snouts in flying machines and standing for "Politically Incorrect Geniuses". The main contributors were artists, including Rachel Harrison, Dennis Oppenheim, Gretchen Faust, Sean Landers, Rikrit Tiravaneja, Fred Tomaselli and Sue Williams, as well as Young British Artists such as Marcus Harvey, Angus Fairhurst and Damien Hirst.

The Native Navigated His Canoe by the Stars and Peacefully Disappeared into the Bermuda Triangle # 2 by John LeKay, 1993, acrylic lacquer on canvas

1990–1994, he made "pour paintings" out of acrylic lacquer metallic car paint, using a hair dryer on some and putting others on a see-saw, swivel table to turn and tilt the paintings to create different shapes as the paint ran. His inspiration for such works came from looking at a science catalogue's microscopic slides of viruses, bacteria, AIDS, bubonic plague and cancer, which he described as "quite beautiful under a microscope". The Watercourse Way by Alan Watts suggested the idea of minimal effort.

In 1991, he exhibited in the group show The Interrupted Life at the New Museum of Contemporary Life, New York, and showed his Cryonic Suspension Dewar, a container filled with liquid nitrogen at -196 °C, 320 °F below zero, a temperature which prevents biochemical and metabolic activity. LeKay's intention was for a collector to buy the piece, in order to be frozen in it, when they died.

Ring a Ring of Roses by John LeKay, 1990–91, sexual surrogate dolls and masks

In 1991–92, he exhibited at the Feature Gallery and Kenny Schacter Rove Gallery with "sex-pieces", consisting of copulating blow up sex dolls wearing caricature animal masks. In 1992, he had a show at the Randy Alexander gallery. Work included a stained orthopedic mattress covered with dildos, a medical model of a diseased scrotum, a prosthetic leg brace attached to a three legged chair, and a wheelchair balanced on top of an aluminum stepladder, the latter piece representing shamanism.

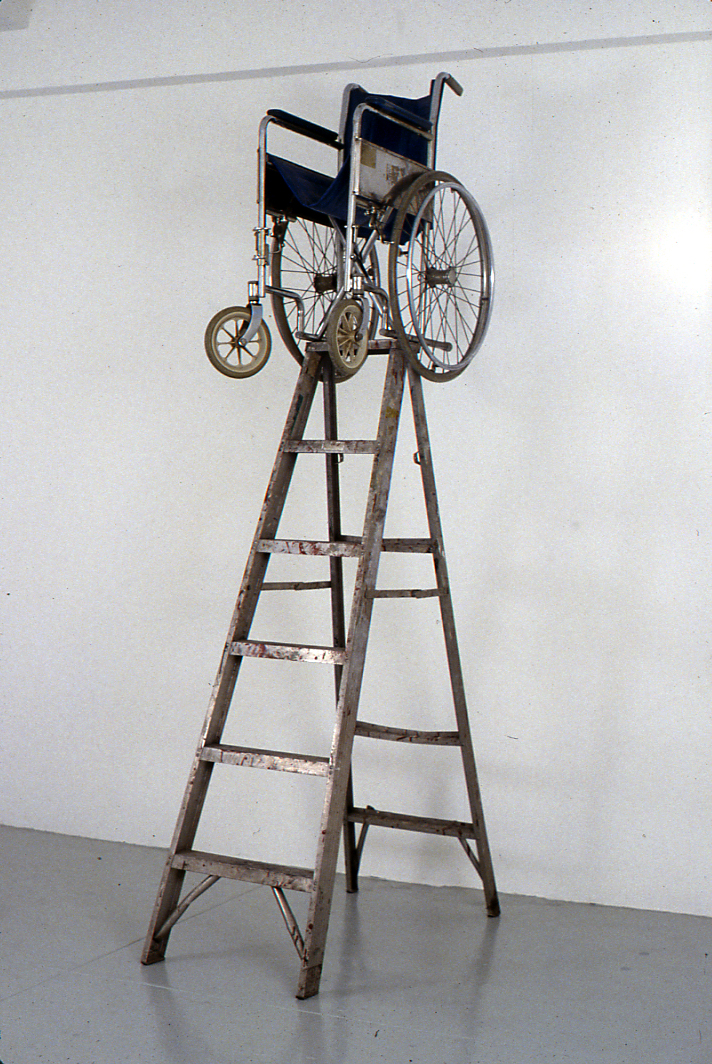
Untitled by John LeKay, 1991, ladder and wheelchair

Critic Gretchen Faust wrote, "There is a quirky humor underlying the work that reverses without warning into a strange and cutting malevolence". In December that year, in a group show, Fever, at Exit Art in New York, he exhibited a leg brace resting on a three-legged chair.

In April 1993, with a reputation as a "participant in a half-dozen trendy group shows" and a "strung out enfant terrible", he held a show at the Cohen Gallery which "eschewed his previous sexual gimmickry, effectively blending humor and horror." It was called The Separation of Church and State, consisted of installations from found objects, and was held in two stages with strong references to Christian iconography. Two sculptures were shown in the first part of the show. The title piece was a cruciform over stained carpet with a wheelchair in the centre on a mattress and Guns N' Roses emanating from a tape recorder. A cross formed from items such as brooms and curtain rods connected to four assemblages of household junk, such as a stainless-steel sink on top of a dirty kitchen cabinet, and a headless Madonna and Child sculpture on a black and white television set resting on a leaning toilet. The other installation, Lazyboy Jesus, 1991-92 was a dime-store image of Christ on a Naugahyde La-Z-Boy armchair.

Andrew Perchuk in Artforum saw in the display, "psychological disablement, the inability to experience the spiritual amidst the noise of materialism, kitsch, television, and our own laziness. At the same time we feel the oppressive nature of much organized religion, which holds out the promise of spiritual solace to those willing to pay up." He observed "a certain formal elegance", but also that "LeKay attempts to shock, revelling in his obvious poor taste," an example of the latter being Zipperdeedudazipperdeeday, 1991-92, which appropriated the voices of homeless black men. George Melrod in Art in America wrote:

In LeKay's world, damage is omnipresent, every balance is precarious, and every stab at transcendence reeks of kitsch and desperation. For all its calculated melodrama, his work captures something akin to genuine anguish.

LeKay described These Colors Don't Run, 1991-93' (an American flag topping a garbage can) as "a suicide machine" and that he worked "on the fine line where something can be really awful or really beautiful." Damien Hirst interviewed LeKay and the transcript appears in the catalogue for the show. They were both represented by the Cohen Gallery.

Spiritus Callidus #1 (Crystal Skull) by John Lekay, 1993, paradichlorobenzene

In 1993, inspired by Mayan skulls, he made 25 skulls, using crystal to create a glistening effect: "When the light hits it, it looks as if it is covered in diamonds." Initially he used paradichlorobenzene, a substance more often found as a toilet deodoriser. He first showed such a skull at the Cohen Gallery. He subsequently developed this idea, using materials such as soap and wax, artificial diamonds and Swarovski crystals.

Spiritus Callidus #2 (Crystal Skull) by John Lekay, 1993, paradichlorobenzene

In 1994, he held an exhibition, Delires de L'Ange Neutre ("Delirium of the Neutral Angel"), at the Kenny Schachter gallery in New York. The display consisted of an angel and fourteen demons, each displayed in their own Plexiglas vitrine. The figures were made from paradichlorobenzene and this necessitated LeKay wearing a gas mask while he worked on the sculptures. The show also went to the University at Buffalo art gallery and similar work was in The Monster Show in the Museum of Contemporary Art, Miami.

In 1996, LeKay exhibited with the Kenny Schachter at the third annual Gramercy International Contemporary Art Fair. Described as "tall and rather forbidding", he arrived with a large carton containing a head made from paradichlorobenzene.

In January 2005, LeKay started the heyokamagazine.com website, which campaigns against native American poverty and environmental pollution as well as featuring interviews with, amongst others, Buffy Saint Marie, Sarita Choudhury and Alex James.

== Damien Hirst accusations ==
Yin and Yang #1 by John LeKay, 1990, ready made, purchased from Carolina Biological Supply Company catalogue

In 2007, when Damien Hirst exhibited For the Love of God, a platinum cast of a skull with the surface covered with diamonds, LeKay accused Hirst of copying his idea: "When I heard he was doing it, I felt like I was being punched in the gut. When I saw the image online, I felt that a part of me was in the piece. I was a bit shocked." LeKay has stated that he was a friend of Damien Hirst between 1992 and 1994 and shared a mixed show with him. LeKay also stated that Hirst had got other ideas for his work from a "marked-up duplicate copy" of a Carolina Biological Supply Company catalogue, which he had given him. One example was Hirst's work Mother and Child, Divided – a cow and calf cut in half and placed in formaldehyde: "You have no idea how much he got from this catalogue. The Cow Divided is on page 647 – it is a model of a cow divided down the centre, like his piece." Lekay said, "I would like Damien to acknowledge that 'John really did inspire the skull and influenced my work a lot.'"

== Solo shows ==
Sangulipe by John Lekay, 2002–2005, Swarovski crystals, wax, magnets and computerized system

- 1995 University at Buffalo Art Gallery, Buffalo, NY
- 1994 Kenny Schachter, New York
- 1993 Cohen Gallery, New York
- 1991 Randy Alexander Gallery, New York
- 1990 Paula Allen Gallery, New York

Group shows have included Modern Museum of Art, Lisbon, Cabinet Gallery, London and Metropol Gallery, Austria.
