= Damien Hirst =

British artist (born 1965)

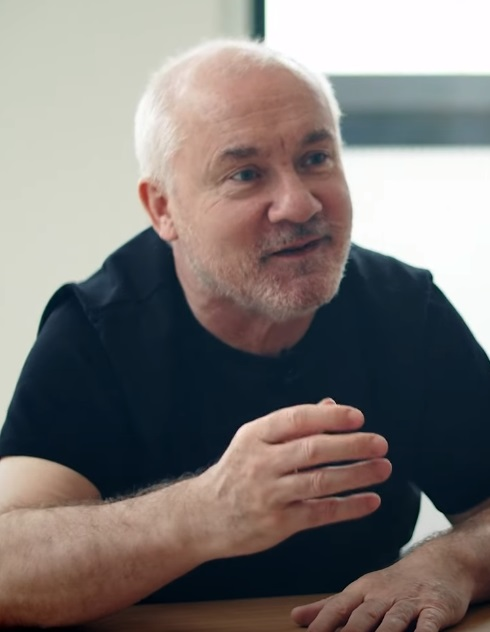
- Hirst in 2021
- Born: Damien Steven Brennan; 7 June 1965 (age 61); Bristol, England
- Education: Jacob Kramer College; Goldsmiths College
- Known for: Diversity; Installation Art; Painting; Sculpture
- Notable work: The Physical Impossibility of Death in the Mind of Someone Living; For the Love of God; Verity
- Movement: Young British Artists
- Awards: Turner Prize
- Patrons: Charles Saatchi
- Damien Hirst's voice Recorded May 2013 from the BBC Radio 4 programme Desert Island Discs
- Website: damienhirst.com

Damien Steven Hirst (/hɜːrst/; né Brennan; born 7 June 1965) is an English artist and art collector. He was one of the Young British Artists (YBAs) who dominated the art scene in the UK during the 1990s. He is reportedly the United Kingdom's richest living artist, with his wealth estimated at US$384 million in the 2020 Sunday Times Rich List. During the 1990s his career was closely linked with the collector Charles Saatchi, but increasing frictions came to a head in 2003 and the relationship ended.

Death is a central theme in Hirst's works. He became famous for a series of artworks in which dead animals (including a shark, a sheep, a pig, and a cow) are preserved, sometimes having been dissected, in formaldehyde. The best-known of these is The Physical Impossibility of Death in the Mind of Someone Living, a 14-foot (4.3 m) tiger shark immersed in formaldehyde in a clear display case.

In September 2008, Hirst made an unprecedented move for a living artist by selling a complete show, Beautiful Inside My Head Forever, at Sotheby's by auction and bypassing his long-standing galleries. The auction raised £111 million ($198 million), breaking the record for a one-artist auction as well as Hirst's own record with £10.3 million for The Golden Calf, an animal with 18-carat gold horns and hooves, preserved in formaldehyde.

Since 1999, Hirst's works have been challenged and contested as plagiarised 16 times. In one instance, after his sculpture Hymn was found to be closely based on a child's toy, legal proceedings led to an out-of-court settlement.

== Early life and training ==
Hirst was born Damien Steven Brennan in Bristol and grew up in Leeds with his Irish mother who worked for the Citizens Advice Bureau. He never met his father; his mother married his stepfather when Hirst was two, and the couple divorced 10 years later. His stepfather was reportedly a motor mechanic.

His mother stated that she lost control of her son when he was young; he was arrested on two occasions for shoplifting. Hirst sees her as someone who would not tolerate rebellion: she cut up his bondage trousers and heated one of his Sex Pistols vinyl records on the cooker to turn it into a fruit bowl (or a plant pot). He says, "If she didn't like how I was dressed, she would quickly take me away from the bus stop". She did, though, encourage his liking for drawing, which was his only successful educational subject.

His art teacher at Allerton Grange School "pleaded" for Hirst to be allowed to enter the sixth form, where he took two A-levels, achieving an "E" grade in art. He was refused admission to Jacob Kramer College when he first applied, but attended the art school after a subsequent successful application to the Foundation Diploma course.

He went to an exhibition of work by Francis Davison, staged by Julian Spalding at the Hayward Gallery in 1983. Davison created abstract collages from torn and cut coloured paper which, Hirst said, "blew me away", and which inspired his own work for the next two years.

He worked for two years on London building sites, then studied Fine Art at Goldsmiths College (1986–89), although again he was refused a place the first time he applied. In 2007, Hirst was quoted as saying of An Oak Tree by Goldsmiths' senior tutor, Michael Craig-Martin: "That piece is, I think, the greatest piece of conceptual sculpture. I still can't get it out of my head." While a student, Hirst had a placement at a mortuary, an experience that influenced his later themes and materials. While an art student, Hirst was an assistant at Anthony d'Offay's gallery.

== Early career—student and warehouse shows ==
In July 1988, in his second year at Goldsmiths College, Hirst was the main organiser of an independent student exhibition, Freeze, in a disused London Port Authority administrative block in London's Docklands. He gained sponsorship for this event from the London Docklands Development Corporation. The show was visited by Charles Saatchi, Norman Rosenthal and Nicholas Serota, thanks to the influence of his Goldsmiths lecturer Michael Craig-Martin. Hirst's own contribution to the show consisted of a cluster of cardboard boxes painted with household paint. After graduating, Hirst was included in New Contemporaries show and in a group show at Kettle's Yard gallery in Cambridge. Seeking a gallery dealer, he first approached Karsten Schubert, but was turned down.

Hirst, along with his friend Carl Freedman and Billee Sellman, curated two enterprising "warehouse" shows in 1990, Modern Medicine and Gambler, in a Bermondsey former Peek Freans biscuit factory they designated "Building One". Saatchi arrived at the second show in a green Rolls-Royce and, according to Freedman, stood open-mouthed with astonishment in front of (and then bought) Hirst's first major "animal" installation, A Thousand Years, consisting of a large glass case containing maggots and flies feeding on a rotting cow's head. They also staged Michael Landy's Market. At this time, Hirst said, "I can't wait to get into a position to make really bad art and get away with it. At the moment if I did certain things people would look at it, consider it and then say 'f off'. But after a while you can get away with things."

== Professional career ==
=== 1987–1990 ===
- 1987 – Damien Hirst and Holden Rowan, Old Court Gallery, Windsor Arts Centre, Windsor, UK – Curator Derek Culley
- 1988 – Damien Hirst: Constructions and Sculpture, Old Court Gallery, Windsor, UK -Curator Derek Culley
- 1988 – Freeze, Surrey Docks, London, UK
- 1989 – New Contemporaries, Institute of Contemporary Arts, London, UK
- 1990 – Modern Medicine, Building One, London, UK
- 1990 – Gambler, Building One, London, UK
- 1990 – Building One, Emmanuel Perrotin Gallery, Paris, FR

=== 1991–1994 ===
His first solo exhibition, organised by Tamara Chodzko (now Dial), In and Out of Love, was held in an unused shop on Woodstock Street in central London in 1991; already in 1989 he had been part of a group exhibition at the Institute of Contemporary Arts, and the Emmanuel Perrotin Gallery in Paris. The Serpentine Gallery presented the first survey of the new generation of artists with the exhibition Broken English, in part curated by Hirst. In 1991 Hirst met the up-and-coming art dealer, Jay Jopling, who then represented him.

In 1991, Charles Saatchi had offered to fund whatever artwork Hirst wanted to make, and the result was showcased in 1992 in the first Young British Artists exhibition at the Saatchi Gallery in North London. Hirst's work was titled The Physical Impossibility of Death in the Mind of Someone Living and was a shark in formaldehyde in a vitrine, and sold for £50,000. The shark had been caught by a commissioned fisherman in Australia and had cost £6,000. The exhibition also included In a Thousand Years. As a result of the show, Hirst was nominated for that year's Turner Prize, but it was awarded to Grenville Davey.

Hirst's first major international presentation was in the Venice Biennale in 1993 with the work, Mother and Child Divided, a cow and a calf cut into sections and exhibited in a series of separate vitrines. He curated the show Some Went Mad, Some Ran Away in 1994 at the Serpentine Gallery in London, where he exhibited Away from the Flock (a sheep in a tank of formaldehyde). On 9 May, Mark Bridger, a 35-year-old artist from Oxford, walked into the gallery and poured black ink into the tank, and retitled the work Black Sheep. He was subsequently prosecuted, at Hirst's wish, and was given two years' probation. The sculpture was restored at a cost of £1,000. When a photograph of Away from the Flock was reproduced in the 1997 book by Hirst I want to spend the rest of my life everywhere, with everyone, one-to-one, always, forever, now, the vandalism was referenced by allowing the tank to be obscured by pulling a card, reproducing the effect of ink being poured into the tank; this resulted in Hirst being sued by Bridger for violating his copyright on Black Sheep.

In 1994, Hirst wrote and directed an advertisement for TNT UK's 100% Weird television strand. The advert followed a man taking his pet canary for a walk to the local butcher, and featured a slew of surreal and bizarre imagery, including a group of eyeless men playing cards while a skinned dead cow drops onto the floor, a man on a high-rise chair defecating a kidney bean, and a businessman (played by Malcolm McLaren, who also composed the music for the advert) wearing earrings. While TNT were initially "delighted" by the advert, which was intended to play in cinemas and then have brief snippets shown on television, it was eventually rejected due to its "inappropriate" imagery.

=== 1995–1999 ===
In 1995, Hirst won the Turner Prize. New York public health officials banned Two Fucking and Two Watching featuring a rotting cow and bull, because of fears of "vomiting among the visitors". There were solo shows in Seoul, London and Salzburg. He directed the video for the song "Country House" for the band Blur. No Sense of Absolute Corruption, his first solo show in the Gagosian Gallery in New York was staged the following year. In London the short film, Hanging Around, was shown—written and directed by Hirst and starring Eddie Izzard. In 1997 the Sensation exhibition opened at the Royal Academy in London. A Thousand Years and other works by Hirst were included, but the main controversy occurred over other artists' works. It was nevertheless seen as the formal acceptance of the YBAs into the establishment.

In 1997, his autobiography and art book, I Want To Spend the Rest of My Life Everywhere, with Everyone, One to One, Always, Forever, Now, was published. With Alex James of the band Blur and actor Keith Allen, he formed the band Fat Les, achieving a number 2 hit with a raucous football-themed song Vindaloo, followed up by Jerusalem with the London Gay Men's Chorus. Hirst also painted a simple colour pattern for the Beagle 2 probe. This pattern was to be used to calibrate the probe's cameras after it had landed on Mars. He turned down the British Council's invitation to be the UK's representative at the 1999 Venice Biennale because "it didn't feel right". He threatened to sue British Airways claiming a breach of copyright over an advert design with coloured spots for its low budget airline, Go.

=== 2000–2004 ===
In 2000, Hirst's sculpture Hymn (which Saatchi had bought for a reported £1m) was given pole position at the show Ant Noises (an anagram of "sensation") in the Saatchi Gallery. Hirst was then sued himself for breach of copyright over this sculpture (see Appropriation below). Hirst sold three more copies of his sculpture for similar amounts to the first. In September 2000, in New York, Larry Gagosian held the Hirst show, Damien Hirst: Models, Methods, Approaches, Assumptions, Results and Findings. 100,000 people visited the show in 12 weeks and all the work was sold.

On 10 September 2002, on the eve of the first anniversary of the 9/11 World Trade Center attacks, Hirst said in an interview with BBC News Online:

The thing about 9/11 is that it's kind of like an artwork in its own right. It was wicked, but it was devised in this way for this kind of impact. It was devised visually... You've got to hand it to them on some level because they've achieved something which nobody would have ever have thought possible, especially to a country as big as America. So on one level they kind of need congratulating, which a lot of people shy away from, which is a very dangerous thing.

The next week, following public outrage at his remarks, he issued a statement through his company, Science Ltd:

I apologise unreservedly for any upset I have caused, particularly to the families of the victims of the events on that terrible day.

In 2002, Hirst gave up smoking and drinking after his wife Maia had complained and "had to move out because I was so horrible". He had met Joe Strummer (former lead singer of The Clash) at Glastonbury in 1995, becoming good friends and going on annual family holidays with him. Just before Christmas 2002, Strummer died of a heart attack. This had a profound effect on Hirst, who said, "It was the first time I felt mortal". He subsequently devoted a lot of time to founding a charity, Strummerville, to help young musicians.

In April 2003, the Saatchi Gallery opened at new premises in County Hall, London, with a show that included a Hirst retrospective. This brought a developing strain in his relationship with Saatchi to a head (one source of contention had been who was most responsible for boosting their mutual profile). Hirst disassociated himself from the retrospective to the extent of not including it in his CV. He was angry that a Mini car that he had decorated for charity with his trademark spots was being exhibited as a serious artwork. The show also scuppered a prospective Hirst retrospective at Tate Modern. He said Saatchi was "childish" and "I'm not Charles Saatchi's barrel-organ monkey ... He only recognises art with his wallet ... he believes he can affect art values with buying power, and he still believes he can do it."

In September 2003, he had an exhibition Romance in the Age of Uncertainty at Jay Jopling's White Cube gallery in London, which made him a reported £11m, bringing his wealth to over £35m. It was reported that a sculpture, Charity, had been sold for £1.5m to a Korean, Kim Chang-Il, who intended to exhibit it in his department store's gallery in Seoul. The 22-foot (6.7m), 6-ton sculpture was based on the 1960s Spastic Society's model, which is of a girl in leg irons holding a collecting box. In Hirst's version the collecting box is shown broken open and is empty.

Charity was exhibited in the centre of Hoxton Square, in front of White Cube. Inside the gallery downstairs were 12 vitrines representing Jesus's disciples, each case containing mostly gruesome, often blood-stained, items relevant to the particular disciple. At the end was an empty vitrine, representing Christ. Upstairs were four small glass cases, each containing a cow's head stuck with scissors and knives. It has been described as an "extraordinarily spiritual experience" in the tradition of Catholic imagery. At this time Hirst bought back 12 works from Saatchi (a third of Saatchi's holdings of Hirst's early works), through Jay Jopling, reportedly for more than £8 million. Hirst had sold these pieces to Saatchi in the early 1990s for rather less, his first installations costing under £10,000.

On 24 May 2004, a fire in the Momart storage warehouse destroyed many works from the Saatchi collection, including 17 of Hirst's, although the sculpture Charity survived, as it was outside in the builder's yard. That July, Hirst said of Saatchi, "I respect Charles. There's not really a feud. If I see him, we speak, but we were never really drinking buddies."

Hirst designed a cover image for the Band Aid 20 charity single featuring the "Grim Reaper" in late 2004, and image showing an African child perched on his knee. This design was not to the liking of the record company executives, and was replaced by reindeer in the snow standing next to a child.

In December 2004, The Physical Impossibility of Death in the Mind of Someone Living was sold by Saatchi to American collector Steve Cohen, for $8 million, in a deal negotiated by Hirst's New York agent, Gagosian. Cohen, a Greenwich hedge fund manager, then donated the work to The Metropolitan Museum of Art, New York. Sir Nicholas Serota had wanted to acquire it for the Tate Gallery, and Hugo Swire, Shadow Minister for the Arts, tabled a question to ask if the government would ensure it stayed in the country.

=== 2005–2009 ===
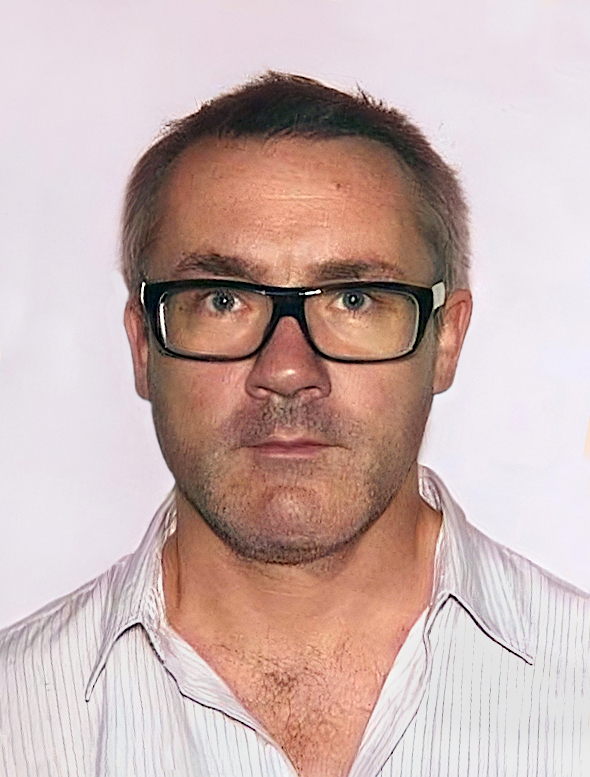
Hirst in 2007

Hirst exhibited 30 paintings at the Gagosian Gallery in New York in March 2005. These had taken 3½ years to complete. They were closely based on photos, mostly by assistants (who were rotated between paintings) but with a final finish by Hirst. Also in 2005, Hirst founded the art book publisher Other Criteria.

In February 2006, he opened a major show in Mexico, at the Hilario Galguera Gallery, called The Death of God, Towards a Better Understanding of Life without God aboard The Ship of Fools, an exhibition that attracted considerable media coverage as Hirst's first show in Latin America. In June that year, he exhibited alongside the work of Francis Bacon (Triptychs) at the Gagosian Gallery, Britannia Street, London, an exhibition that included the vitrine, A Thousand Years (1990), and four triptychs: paintings, medicine cabinets and a new formaldehyde work entitled The Tranquility of Solitude (For George Dyer), influenced by Bacon.

A Thousand Years (1990) contains an actual life cycle. Maggots hatch inside a white minimal box, turn into flies, then feed on a bloody, severed cow's head on the floor of a claustrophobic glass vitrine. Above, hatched flies buzz around in the closed space. Many meet a violent end in an insect-o-cutor; others survive to continue the cycle. A Thousand Years was admired by Bacon, who in a letter to a friend a month before he died, wrote about the experience of seeing the work at the Saatchi Gallery in London. Margarita Coppack notes that "It is as if Bacon, a painter with no direct heir in that medium, was handing the baton on to a new generation." Hirst has openly acknowledged his debt to Bacon, absorbing the painter's visceral images and obsessions early on and giving them concrete existence in sculptural form with works like A Thousand Years.

Hirst gained the world record for the most expensive work of art by a living artist—his Lullaby Spring in June 2007, when a 3-metre-wide steel cabinet with 6,136 pills sold for 19.2 million dollars to Sheikh Hamad bin Khalifa Al-Thani, the Emir of Qatar.

For the Love of God by Damien Hirst (2007)

In June 2007, Beyond Belief, an exhibition of Hirst's new work, opened at the White Cube gallery in London. The centre-piece, a Memento Mori titled For the Love of God, was a human skull recreated in platinum and adorned with 8,601 diamonds weighing a total of 1,106.18 carats. Approximately £15,000,000 worth of diamonds were used. It was modelled on an 18th-century skull, but the only surviving human part of the original is the teeth. The asking price for For the Love of God was £50,000,000 ($100 million or 75 million euros). It didn't sell outright, and on 30 August 2008 was sold to a consortium that included Hirst himself and his gallery White Cube.

In November 2008, the skull was exhibited at the Rijksmuseum in Amsterdam next to an exhibition of paintings from the museum collection selected by Hirst. Wim Pijbes, the museum director, said of the exhibition, "It boosts our image. Of course, we do the Old Masters but we are not a 'yesterday institution'. It's for now. And Damien Hirst shows this in a very strong way."

Responding to this show at the Rijksmuseum and to the piece more generally in a feature-length article on the entwined histories of European art and double-entry bookkeeping, the art historian Rachel Cohen wrote:

Two years [after the sale of For the Love of God], with financial markets imploding on every side, it was reported that the work had in fact been sold to a holding company that turned out to consist of Hirst's gallerist, his business manager, his friend the Russian billionaire art collector Viktor Pinchuk, and Hirst himself. There were then those who, staring at their own newly empty stock portfolios, found in the title apt expression of their feelings. The work itself, with its diamond-laden eye sockets and its original inhabitant's grinning teeth, seems unperturbed by any hollowness of value in the financial or art markets. It does not matter to this cynical epitome of our glittering age whether it was made for the love of anything but more zeroes.

In December 2008, Hirst contacted the Design and Artists Copyright Society (DACS) demanding action be taken over works containing images of his skull sculpture For the Love of God made by a 16-year-old graffiti artist, Cartrain, and sold on the internet gallery 100artworks.com. On the advice of his gallery, Cartrain handed over the artworks to DACS and forfeited the £200 he had made; he said, "I met Christian Zimmermann [from DACS] who told me Hirst personally ordered action on the matter." In June 2009, copyright lawyer Paul Tackaberry compared the two images and said, "This is fairly non-contentious legally. Ask yourself, what portion of the original–and not just the quantity but also the quality–appears in the new work? If a 'substantial portion' of the 'original' appears in the new work, then that's all you need for copyright infringement... Quantitatively about 80% of the skull is in the second image."

In April – September 2009, the exhibition Requiem took place in the Victor Pinchuk art centre.

In October 2009, Hirst revealed that he had been painting with his own hand in a style influenced by Francis Bacon for several years. His show of these paintings, No Love Lost, was at the Wallace Collection in London.

=== 2010–2014 ===
In 2011, Damien Hirst designed the cover of the Red Hot Chili Peppers album I'm with You.

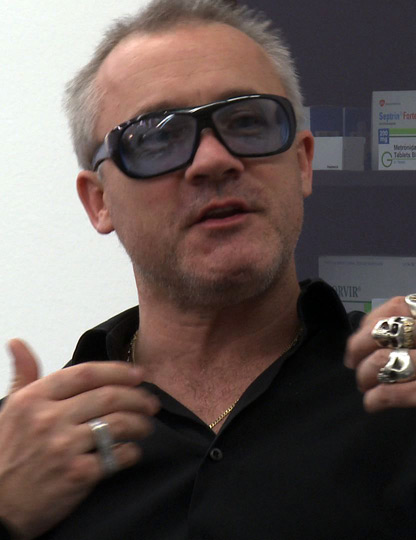
Hirst in the 2010 documentary: The Future of Art

Hirst's representation of the British Union Flag formed the arena centrepiece for the 2012 Summer Olympics closing ceremony in London. In January 2013, Hirst became the third British artist to design the Brit Awards statue using his signature NEO-Pop art style inspired by his 2000 LSD "spot painting." In October 2014, Hirst exhibited big scale capsules, pills and medicines at the Paul Stolper Gallery titled, Schizophrenogenesis.

=== 2015–present ===
In April 2016, a study published in Analytical Methods claimed Hirst's preserved carcasses leaked formaldehyde gas above legal limits at Tate Modern; however, this study was shown to be flawed.

In 2017, he organised with Pinault Foundation a solo exhibition, in Venice contemporarily to the Biennale in two places in the city: Palazzo Grassi and Punta della Dogana. The title was Treasures from the Wreck of the Unbelievable, purporting to present ancient treasures from a sunken Greek ship, with pieces that range from Ancient Egyptian-alike items to Disney character reproductions, encrusted with shells and corals.

In July 2021 through January 2022, Hirst's series Cherry Blossoms was exhibited at the Foundation Cartier in Paris. The exhibition was then moved to the National Art Center in Tokyo in 2022. The show marked Hirst's first major solo exhibition in Japan.

=== The Physical Impossibility of Death in the Mind of Someone Living ===
This artwork features a large tiger shark suspended in formaldehyde. The tank in which the shark is floating creates the illusion of the animal being cut into three pieces due to the container looking like three separate sections. The work was created in 1991, and since then, the formaldehyde preserving the shark has slowly eaten away at the animal's body, which shows signs of decay. Hirst says that the formaldehyde surrounding the shark is the process of death and decay.

Some critics argue that the minimalistic qualities of the work, coinciding with the 'stereotypical' death theme, are too bland for such a prestigious artist. One critic, Craig Raine wrote, "But the famous shark, shackled to its coffeebar-existentialist title – The Physical Impossibility of Death in the Mind of Someone Living – seems ever more dilapidated, more fairground sideshow, with every dowdy showing. What clichéd menace it may once have theoretically possessed has evaporated."

In his essay Damien Hirst's Shark: Nature, Capitalism and the Sublime, art critic Luke White connects the work to the concept of the "Burkean Sublime", but challenges Hirst's own idea of the shark as a primordial "universal trigger" of horror in humans by tracing the different attitudes towards sharks (both real and artistically rendered) in various times and places throughout history. With this view, he describes Hirst "not [as an] exemplary artist, but rather a symptomatic one, who tells us much about our own time," and views the work as a reflection of the contradictions and anxieties of modern life imposed by systems of capitalism, and of "growing fears about environmental catastrophe" which threatens to limit "human power, progress and wealth," if not completely destroy us.

=== Beautiful Inside My Head Forever ===
Beautiful Inside My Head Forever was a two-day auction of Hirst's new work at Sotheby's, London, taking place on 15 and 16 September 2008. It was unusual as he bypassed galleries and sold directly to the public. Writing in The Independent, Cahal Milmo said that the idea of the auction was conceived by Hirst's business advisor of 13 years, Frank Dunphy, who had to overcome Hirst's initial reluctance about the idea. Hirst eventually defended the concept and refuted the accusation that he was only interested in making money:

People always worry that money somehow tarnishes art, but I always thought it was disgusting that people like Van Gogh never made any money. It's important to make sure that the art takes precedence over the money. Most people worry that somehow you lose your integrity. Frank said to me a long time ago: "Always have to make sure that you use the money to chase the art and not the art to chase the money." And I think that's true; you have to look at that very carefully.

The sale raised £111 million ($198 million) for 218 items. The auction exceeded expectations, and was ten times higher than the existing Sotheby's record for a single artist sale, occurring as the financial markets plunged. The Sunday Times said that Hirst's business colleagues had "propped up" the sale prices, making purchases or bids which totalled over half of the £70.5 million spent on the first sale day: Harry Blain of the Haunch of Venison gallery said that bids were entered on behalf of clients wishing to acquire the work.

== Hirst art collecting ==
In November 2006, Hirst was curator of In the darkest hour there may be light, shown at the Serpentine Gallery, London, the first public exhibition of (a small part of) his own collection. Now known as the 'murderme collection', this significant accumulation of works spans several generations of international artists, from well-known figures such as Francis Bacon, Jeff Koons, Tracey Emin, Richard Prince, Banksy and Andy Warhol, to British painters such as John Bellany, John Hoyland, and Gary Hume, and artists in earlier stages of their careers Rachel Howard, David Choe, Ross Minoru Laing, Nicholas Lumb, Tom Ormond, and Dan Baldwin.

Hirst is currently restoring the Grade I listed Toddington Manor, near Cheltenham, where he intends to eventually house the complete collection. In 2007, Hirst donated the 1991 sculptures The Acquired Inability to Escape and Life Without You and the 2002 work Who is Afraid of the Dark? (fly painting), and an exhibition copy from 2007 of Mother and Child Divided to Tate from his own personal collection of works.

In 2010, Hirst was among the unsuccessful bidders to take over the Magazine Building, a 19th-century structure in Kensington Gardens, which reopened in 2013 as the Serpentine Sackler Gallery after its conversion by Zaha Hadid. In March 2012, he outlined his plans to open a gallery in Vauxhall, London specifically designed to exhibit his personal collection, which includes five pieces by Francis Bacon. The Newport Street Gallery opened in October 2015. It is located in a former theater carpentry and scenery production workshops redesigned by Peter St John and Adam Caruso, and runs the length of Newport Street in Vauxhall.

== Awards and recognition ==
Hirst was nominated for the Turner Prize in 1992, for his first Young British Artists exhibition at the Saatchi Gallery in North London, which included his The Physical Impossibility of Death..., with the award going to Grenville Davey that year.

Hirst won the Turner Prize in 1995. He was asked to represent the UK in the Venice Biennale in 1999 or to become a Royal Academian but refused.

In 2012, Hirst was among the British cultural icons selected by artist Sir Peter Blake to appear in a new version of his album cover for the Beatles' Sgt. Pepper's Lonely Hearts Club Band, to celebrate the British cultural figures of his life that he most admires.

== Critical responses ==
=== Positive ===
Hirst has been praised in recognition of his celebrity and the way this has galvanised interest in the arts, raising the profile of British art and helping to (re)create the image of "Cool Britannia." In the mid-1990s, the Heritage Secretary, Virginia Bottomley recognised him as "a pioneer of the British art movement", and even sheep farmers were pleased he had raised increased interest in British lamb. Janet Street-Porter praised his originality, which had brought art to new audiences and was the "art-world equivalent of the Oasis concerts at Earl's Court".

Andres Serrano is also known for shocking work and understands that contemporary fame does not necessarily equate to lasting fame, but backs Hirst: "Damien is very clever ... First you get the attention ... Whether or not it will stand the test of time, I don't know, but I think it will." Sir Nicholas Serota commented, "Damien is something of a showman ... It is very difficult to be an artist when there is huge public and media attention. Because Damien Hirst has been built up as a very important figure, there are plenty of sceptics ready to put the knife in."

Tracey Emin said: "There is no comparison between him and me; he developed a whole new way of making art and he's clearly in a league of his own. It would be like making comparisons with Warhol." Despite Hirst's insults to him, Saatchi remains a staunch supporter, labelling Hirst a genius, and stating:

General art books dated 2105 will be as brutal about editing the late 20th century as they are about almost all other centuries. Every artist other than Jackson Pollock, Andy Warhol, Donald Judd and Damien Hirst will be a footnote.

Hirst was among the names in Blake Gopnik's 2011 list "The 10 Most Important Artists of Today", with Gopnik interpreting Hirst's career as "a metaphor for how consumption has become our guiding force".

=== Negative ===
There has been equally vehement opposition to Hirst's work. Of Hirst's work, the former Evening Standard art critic, Brian Sewell, expressed the following: "I don't think of it as art ... It is no more interesting than a stuffed pike over a pub door. Indeed there may well be more art in a stuffed pike than a dead sheep."

The Stuckist art group was founded in 1999 with a specific anti-Britart agenda by Charles Thomson and Billy Childish; Hirst is one of their main targets. They wrote (referring to a Channel 4 programme on Hirst):

The fact that Hirst's work does mirror society is not its strength but its weakness – and the reason it is guaranteed to decline artistically (and financially) as current social modes become outmoded. What Hirst has insightfully observed of his spin-paintings in Life and Death and Damien Hirst is the only comment that needs to be made of his entire oeuvre: "They're bright and they're zany – but there's fuck all there at the end of the day."

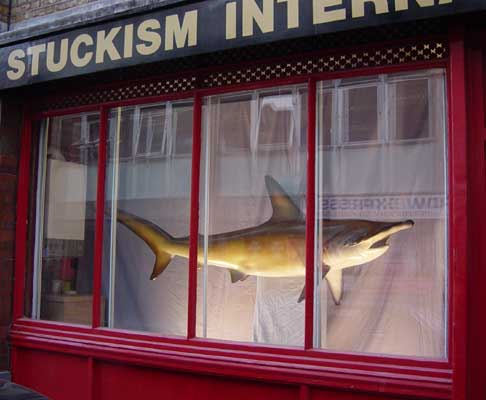
A Dead Shark Isn't Art, Stuckism International Gallery 2003

In 2003, under the title A Dead Shark Isn't Art, the Stuckism International Gallery exhibited a shark which had first been put on public display two years before Hirst's by Eddie Saunders in his Shoreditch shop, JD Electrical Supplies. Thomson asked, "If Hirst's shark is recognised as great art, then how come Eddie's, which was on exhibition for two years beforehand, isn't? Do we perhaps have here an undiscovered artist of genius, who got there first, or is it that a dead shark isn't art at all?" The Stuckists suggested that Hirst may have got the idea for his work from Saunders' shop display.

In a 2008 Channel 4 documentary called The Mona Lisa Curse, art critic Robert Hughes claimed that Hirst's work was "tacky" and "absurd". Hughes said it was "a little miracle" that the value of £5 million was put on Hirst's Virgin Mother (a 35-foot bronze statue), which was made by someone "with so little facility". Hughes called Hirst's shark in formaldehyde "the world's most over-rated marine organism" and attacked the artist for "functioning like a commercial brand", making the case that Hirst and his work proved that financial value was now the only meaning that remained for art.

Hirst's 2009 show, No Love Lost, of paintings by his own hand, at the Wallace Collection in London, received "one of the most unanimously negative responses to any exhibition in living memory". Tom Lubbock of The Independent called Hirst's work derivative, weak and boring: "Hirst, as a painter, is at about the level of a not-very-promising, first-year art student." Rachel Campbell-Johnston of The Times said it was "shockingly bad". A 2012 exhibition of paintings by Hirst at the White Cube gallery in Bermondsey, entitled "Two Weeks One Summer", provoked in The Guardian the comment that Hirst "can kid himself he is an Old Master and have the art world go along with the fantasy".

Julian Spalding, British art critic and author of the book Con Art – Why You Should Sell Your Damien Hirsts While You Can, has said,

It's often been proposed, seriously, that Damien Hirst is a greater artist than Michelangelo because he had the idea for a shark in a tank whereas Michelangelo didn't have the idea for his David ... [but] The emperor has nothing on. When the penny drops that these are not art, it's all going to collapse. Hirst should not be in the Tate. He's not an artist. What separates Michelangelo from Hirst is that Michelangelo was an artist and Hirst isn't.

Hirst's 2012 retrospective at the Tate Gallery, while setting records for attendance, also received many complaints. "Members of the public wrote to the state-funded gallery accusing it of wasting taxpayers' money by showcasing art that was 'repetitive', 'meaningless' and 'almost universally awful'."

Hirst's work has also been a frequent subject of criticism in the tabloid press. A Daily Mail headline read: "For 1,000 years art has been one of our great civilising forces. Today, pickled sheep and soiled beds threaten to make barbarians of us all." Norman Tebbit, commenting on the Sensation exhibition, wrote "Have they gone stark raving mad? The works of the 'artist' are lumps of dead animals. There are thousands of young artists who didn't get a look in, presumably because their work was too attractive to sane people. Modern art experts never learn."

== Backdating claims ==
In March 2024, The Guardian reported that four of Hirst's formaldehyde animal works, which were dated to the 1990s by Hirst's company Science Ltd., were actually made in 2017. The four works in question were made by preserving in formaldehyde a dove, two sharks, and two calves. In response, Science Ltd. claimed that the dates the artist had assigned to these works did not represent the dates they were made, but rather the dates they were conceived.

In May 2024, The Guardian revealed that at least 1,000 paintings of colorful dots on A4 paper, which were part of an art project called The Currency, that Hirst had repeatedly claimed were "made in 2016" and that had the year '2016' inscribed on them along with Hirst's signature were in fact created several years later than claimed. In response, lawyers for Hirst and Science Ltd. did not dispute that at least 1,000 of the paintings dated from 2016 were created years later, but argued that it was Hirst's "usual practice" to date works from a conceptual art project with the date of the project's conception.

== Appropriation and plagiarism claims ==
In 1999, chef Marco Pierre White said Hirst's Butterflies on Mars had plagiarised his own work, Rising Sun, which he then put on display in the restaurant Quo Vadis in place of Hirst's work.

In 2000, Hirst was sued for breach of copyright over his sculpture, Hymn, which was a 20-foot (6.1 m), six ton, enlargement of his son Connor's 14" Young Scientist Anatomy Set, designed by Norman Emms, 10,000 of which are sold a year by Hull-based toy manufacturer Humbrol for £14.99 each. Hirst paid an undisclosed sum to two charities, Children Nationwide and the Toy Trust, in an out-of-court settlement, as well as a "goodwill payment" to Emms. The charitable donation was less than Emms had hoped for. Hirst also agreed to restrictions on further reproductions of his sculpture.

In 2006, a graphic artist and former research associate at the Royal College of Art, Robert Dixon, author of 'Mathographics', alleged that Hirst's print Valium had "unmistakable similarities" to one of his own designs. Hirst's manager contested this by explaining the origin of Hirst's piece was from a book The Penguin Dictionary of Curious and Interesting Geometry (1991)—not realising this was one place where Dixon's design had been published.

Spiritus Callidus#2 by John Lekay, 1993, crystal skull

In 2007, artist John LeKay, a friend of Damien Hirst between 1992 and 1994, was reported by Dalya Alberge of The Times to have provided ideas and inspirations for a variety of his later works, including having given him a "marked-up duplicate copy" of a Carolina Biological Supply Company catalogue that LeKay had been using as inspiration and supply for his work, noting that "You have no idea how much he got from this catalogue. The Cow Divided is on page 647—it is a model of a cow divided down the centre, like his piece", a reference to Hirst's work Mother and Child, Divided, a cow and calf cut in half and placed in formaldehyde. LeKay also suggests that Hirst copied the idea of For the Love of God from his work on crystal skulls in 1993, saying, "I would like Damien to acknowledge that 'John really did inspire the skull and influenced my work a lot.'" Copyright lawyer Paul Tackaberry reviewed images of LeKay's and Hirst's work and saw no basis for any appropriation rising to the legal level of a copyright infringement.

In 2010, in 3:AM Magazine and in The Jackdaw, Charles Thomson argued that there are 15 cases where Hirst plagiarised the work of others, including his enlarged version of an anatomical torso model, Hymn (1999), which Thomson presents alongside a comparable John LeKay's anatomical torso model from Carolina Science, Yin and Yang (1990), and Hirst's In Nomine Patris [In the Name of the Father] (2005), which presents a split-open crucified sheep in a tank of formaldehyde, after John LeKay's comparably posed split-open crucified sheep, entitled This is My Body, This is My Blood (1987) mounted on a wooden board. Other examples cited were the similarity of Hirst's cabinets with shelves and bottles, e.g., My Way (1991), which expanded to become his room-size installation, Pharmacy (1992), which Thomson relates to a Joseph Cornell display of cabinet with shelves and bottles, Pharmacy (1943); and Hirst's appropriation of concept from Lori Precious, who had made stained-glass window effects from butterfly wings from 1994, a number of years before Hirst. The art gallery lemon sky: projects + editions exhibited a selection of these works by Precious at the Year 06 Contemporary Art Fair in London in October 2006, where these pieces were viewed by a large audience and would have been seen at that time, to have credibly been plagiarized. Thomson also suggested that Hirst's spin paintings and installation of a ball on a jet of air were not original, since similar pieces had been made in the 1960s. A spokesperson for Hirst said the article was "poor journalism" and that Hirst would be making a "comprehensive" rebuttal of the claims.

In May 2017 Hirst was accused of copying and appropriating Yoruba art from Ilé-Ifẹ̀ in his work Golden Heads (Female), which was on display in his exhibition Treasures from the Wreck of the Unbelievable at the Venice Biennale. The work, said critics, was not given appropriate context for viewers.

Commenting on his collection, Hirst has said, "As a human being, as you go through life, you just do collect. It was that sort of entropic collecting that I found myself interested in, just amassing stuff while you're alive."

In 2022 artist and writer Joe Machine accused Hirst of plagiarism of his cherry blossom paintings, the 16th accusation of plagiarism against Hirst.

== Hirst business ventures ==
=== Work philosophy ===
Although Hirst participated physically in the making of early works, he has always needed assistants—for instance, Carl Freedman helped with the first vitrines—and the current volume of work produced necessitates a "factory" setup. This has led to questions about authenticity, as was highlighted in 1997, when a spin painting that Hirst said was a "forgery" appeared at sale, although he had previously said that he often had nothing to do with the creation of these pieces.

Hirst said that he only painted five spot paintings himself because, "I couldn't be fucking arsed doing it"; he described his efforts as "shite"—"They're shit compared to ... the best person who ever painted spots for me was Rachel. She's brilliant. Absolutely fucking brilliant. The best spot painting you can have by me is one painted by Rachel." He also describes another painting assistant who was leaving and asked for one of the paintings. Hirst told her to, "'make one of your own.' And she said, 'No, I want one of yours.' But the only difference, between one painted by her and one of mine, is the money.'" By February 1999, two assistants had painted 300 spot paintings. Hirst sees the real creative act as being the conception, not the execution, and that, as the progenitor of the idea, he is therefore the artist:

Art goes on in your head... If you said something interesting, that might be a title for a work of art and I'd write it down. Art comes from everywhere. It's your response to your surroundings. There are on-going ideas I've been working out for years, like how to make a rainbow in a gallery. I've always got a massive list of titles, of ideas for shows, and of works without titles.

Hirst is also known to volunteer repair work on his projects after a client has made a purchase. For example, this service was offered in the case of the suspended shark purchased by Steven A. Cohen.

=== Restaurant ventures ===
Hirst had a short-lived partnership with chef Marco Pierre White in the restaurant Quo Vadis. His best-known restaurant involvement was Pharmacy, located in Notting Hill, London, which closed in 2004. Although one of the owners, Hirst had only leased his art work to the restaurant, so he was able to retrieve and sell it at a Sotheby's auction, earning over £11 million. Some of the work had been adapted, e.g. by signing it prior to the auction.

Hirst is a co-owner of the seafood restaurant, 11 The Quay, in the English seaside town of Ilfracombe. In 2016, Damien Hirst designed the interiors of his new restaurant Pharmacy 2 at the Newport Street Gallery in Vauxhall, London.

=== Net worth ===
Art by Hirst sold at his auction in 2008, Beautiful Inside My Head Forever, raised US$198 million. It is said to be the largest amount raised by any living artist to date. Hirst is reputed to be the richest living artist to date. In 2009, the annually collated chart of the wealthiest individuals in Britain and Ireland, Sunday Times Rich List, placed Hirst at joint number 238 with a net worth of £235m. Hirst's wealth was valued at £215m in the 2010 Sunday Times Rich List, making him Britain's wealthiest artist.

== Works published, shown, sold ==
=== Written ===
- Hirst, Damien (2014). The Complete Spot Paintings. New York, NY: Harry N. Abrams. ISBN 978-1906967482.
- —— (2013). ABC. New York, NY: Harry N. Abrams. ISBN 978-1906967635.

=== Art ===
His works include:

- Pharmacy (1992), a life-size recreation of a chemist's shop.
- Away from the Flock (1994), composed of a dead sheep in a glass tank of formaldehyde.
- Beautiful Axe, Slash, Gosh Painting (1999), signed on the reverse. Gloss household paint on canvas.
- The Virgin Mother, a massive sculpture depicting a pregnant woman, with layers removed from one side to expose the fetus, muscle and tissue layers, and skull underneath. This work was purchased by real estate magnate Aby Rosen for display on the plaza of one of his properties, the Lever House, in New York City.
- Painting-By-Numbers (2001), a do-it-yourself painting kit comprising a stamped canvas, brushes, and 90 paint tins in plexiglass designed to make a 'dot' painting. Part of the exhibition was binned by a gallery cleaner who mistook it for trash.
- The Dream (2008), a simulated unicorn in a tank of formaldehyde solution.
- Spin Drawing for Women's Equality (2016), auctioned as a fundraiser for the Women's Equality Party.
- The Empathy Suite (2019), a 9,000-square-foot hotel suite at the Palms Casino Resort in Las Vegas, designed by Hirst and filled with his artworks on nearly every surface.
- Butterfly Rainbow (2020).

== Personal life ==
Between 1992 and 2012, Hirst lived with his American girlfriend, Maia Norman, with whom he has three sons, born 1995, 2000 and 2005.

Since becoming a father, Hirst has spent most of his time at his remote farmhouse near Combe Martin in Devon. Hirst and Norman were never married, although Hirst had referred to Norman as his "common-law wife".

Hirst has admitted serious drug and alcohol problems during a ten-year period from the early 1990s: "I started taking cocaine and drink... I turned into a babbling fucking wreck." During this time he was known for his wild behaviour and eccentric acts, including putting a cigarette in the end of his penis in front of journalists.

He is a friend of Rolling Stones guitarist Ronnie Wood and 7-time World Snooker Champion Ronnie O'Sullivan.

=== Charitable work ===
Hirst is a supporter of the indigenous rights organisation, Survival International. In September 2008, Hirst donated the work, Beautiful Love Survival, at the Sotheby's London sale, Beautiful Inside My Head Forever, to raise money for this organisation. Later, he also contributed his writing to the book, We Are One: A Celebration of Tribal Peoples, released in October 2009, in support of Survival. The book explores the existence of, and threats to, indigenous cultures around the world.

In 2016 he donated artworks for the secret auction of Art on a Postcard, a charity supporting the fight against Hepatitis C.

== NFTs ==
In July 2021 Hirst announced his first NFT project, named The Currency: it consisted of 10,000 unique hand-painted dot-covered works on paper, each one corresponding to a non-fungible token. Two months later, the project earned a total of $25,000,000. Hirst instructed those who bought pieces from his latest collection to choose either the physical artwork or the NFT representing it. Buyers were informed that corresponding artworks for the unexchanged NFTs would be destroyed, with the first 1,000 artworks being burned on 11 October, 2022. He streamed the burning of his physical pieces on Instagram live from his London gallery and is set to burn thousands more of his artworks to complete the transformation of the selected artworks so they can exist solely as NFTs. It has been estimated the works being burned are collectively worth almost £10 million.

== See also ==
- Charles Saatchi
- Stuckist
- John LeKay
- Young British Artists
