= Peter Fuss =

American professor of philosophy

- Born: 1932 (age 93–94); Berlin

Academic background
- Education: Harvard University (PhD)
- Thesis: The Structure of Royce's Ethical Thought (1962)

Academic work
- Era: Contemporary philosophy
- Region: Western philosophy
- School or tradition: German Idealism
- Institutions: University of Missouri–St. Louis, University of California, Riverside

Peter Fuss (born 1932 in Berlin) is an American philosopher. In 1939, he emigrated to the United States with his parents. From 1969 until his retirement, he was Professor of Philosophy at the University of Missouri–St. Louis.

== Life ==
Peter Fuss was born in Berlin in 1932; his parents were able to emigrate to the USA with him just in time in 1939. He initially grew up in New York City, graduated from Harvard University with a PhD, and then taught as a lecturer in philosophy at the University of California, Riverside from 1961 to 1969 and was Professor of Philosophy at the University of Missouri in St. Louis from 1969 until his retirement.

In his philosophical work, Peter Fuss draws on the traditions of classical German philosophy and critical theory, but combines them with American traditions of political and speculative thought. He is one of the leading interpreters of German idealism – especially Hegel – in the United States. In a long-term research project, Peter Fuss provided a new, philosophically sound translation of G. W. F. Hegel's Phenomenology of Spirit into English. In addition to many other guest invitations, he accepted the Franz Rosenzweig Visiting Professorship at the University of Kassel in 1987.

== Selected publications ==
=== Monographs ===
- Fuss, Peter (1 October 2013). The Moral Philosophy of Josiah Royce. Harvard University Press. doi:10.4159/harvard.9780674333000. ISBN 978-0-674-33300-0.

=== Translations ===
- Hegel, G. W. F. (2019). The Phenomenology of Spirit. University of Notre Dame Press. ISBN 978-0-268-10350-7.
- Hegel, G. W. F. (1984). Three Essays, 1793-1795: The Tubingen Essay, Berne Fragments, and the Life of Jesus. Internet Archive. University of Notre Dame Press. ISBN 978-0-268-04204-2.

=== Editorials ===
- Fuss, Peter; Shapiro, Henry, eds. (1 October 2013). Nietzsche: A Self-Portrait from His Letters. Harvard University Press. doi:10.4159/harvard.9780674332751. ISBN 978-0-674-33275-1.

=== Articles ===
- "Absolute Knowledge: Hegel and the Problem of Metaphysics". Idealistic Studies. 16 (2): 188–189. 1986. doi:10.5840/idstudies198616235. ISSN 0046-8541.
- "Hannah Arendt's Conception of Political Community", in: Idealistic Studies III, 3 .
- "Some Perplexities in Nietzsche", in: Dialogues in Phenomenology, Hague 1975.
- "Theory and Practice in Hegel and Marx: An Unfinished Dialogue", in: Political Theory and Praxis: New Perspectives, Minneapolis 1977.
- "Royce's on the Concept of Self: An Historical and Critical Perspective", in: American Philosophy from Edwards to Quine, Oklahoma 1977.
- "Becoming What You Are: Some Paradoxes in Modern Conceptions of the Self", in: Essays in Honor of W. Werkmeister, Florida 1981.
- "Spontaneity as Praxis: Towards an Intellectual Biography of Ulrich Sonnemann", in: Gottfried Heinemann und Wolfdietrich Schmied-Kowarzik (Hg.), Sabotage des Schicksals. Für Ulrich Sonnemann, Tübingen 1982.
- "The Two-in-One; Self-Identity in Thought, Conscience, and Judgement", in: Idealistic Studies, XVIII, 3 (1988).
- "But of Course the Rational is the Actual and the Other Way Around", in: Contemporary Social Thought, ed. O.A. Robinson and Joseph Bien, Armstrong 1989.
- "Kant's Teleology of Nature", in: Proceedings of the Fifteenth European Studies Conference (1991).
- “Passion and the Genesis of Self-Consciousness”, in: Publications of the Missouri Philological Association, XVII (1992).
- “’Oldsmobil’ – ein echter Amerikaner aus Berlin” sowie “Absolutheitsbegriffe und -erfahrungen in ihrer emanzipatorischen Fähigkeit”, beide in: Wolfdietrich Schmied-Kowarzik (Hg.), Vergegenwärtigungen des zerstörten jüdischen Erbes. Franz-Rosenzweig-Gastvorlesungen Kassel 1987–1998, Kassel 1997.
