= Rachel Cohen =

American writer

- Born: May 19, 1973 (age 53)
- Occupations: Essayist; biographer
- Awards: Guggenheim Fellowship (2014)

Academic background
- Education: Harvard University

Academic work
- Institutions: Sarah Lawrence College; University of Chicago

Rachel Cohen (born May 19, 1973) is an American essayist and biographer. A 2014 Guggenheim Fellow, she is author of A Chance Meeting: Intertwined Lives of American Writers and Artists (2004), also published as A Chance Meeting: American Encounters (2024); Bernard Berenson: A Life in the Picture Trade (2013); and Austen Years: A Memoir in Five Novels (2020). She has been on the faculty of Sarah Lawrence College and the University of Chicago.

== Biography ==
Rachel Cohen was born in 1973 and raised in an "academic family" in Ann Arbor, Michigan, where she attended high school. She received the James N. Britton volume An Anthology of Verse for Children as a young child. She obtained her BA from Harvard University in 1994. In 1993, she originally worked as an AIDS activist while in Paris.

Cohen was a MacDowell Colony Fellow twice, in 2000 and 2002. She won the 2003 PEN/Jerard Fund Award for her essay series A Chance Meeting: Intertwined Lives of American Writers and Artists. In 2013, she published Bernard Berenson: A Life in the Picture Trade, a biography of the art historian. In 2014, she was awarded a Guggenheim Fellowship in General Nonfiction. In 2020, she published Austen Years: A Memoir in Five Novels, about Jane Austen. She also "wrote a whole book of essays about Pessoa, Mandelstam and Cavafy that was never published". She is also a New York Foundation for the Arts Fellow.

At some point before 2004, Cohen joined the Sarah Lawrence College faculty, specializing in creative writing. In 2016, she began teaching at the University of Chicago, working as a professor of practice. Following the start of the COVID-19 pandemic, she began using Zoom as a platform for classes with 92nd Street Y.

Cohen has lived in Brooklyn, Cambridge, Massachusetts, and Chicago.

== Bibliography ==
- A Chance Meeting: Intertwined Lives of American Writers and Artists (2004) (Note: Reviews of this book:)
- Bernard Berenson: A Life in the Picture Trade (2013) (Note: Reviews of this book:)
- Austen Years: A Memoir in Five Novels (2020) (Note: Reviews of this book:)
