= Beautiful Inside My Head Forever =

Auction of new work at Sotheby's

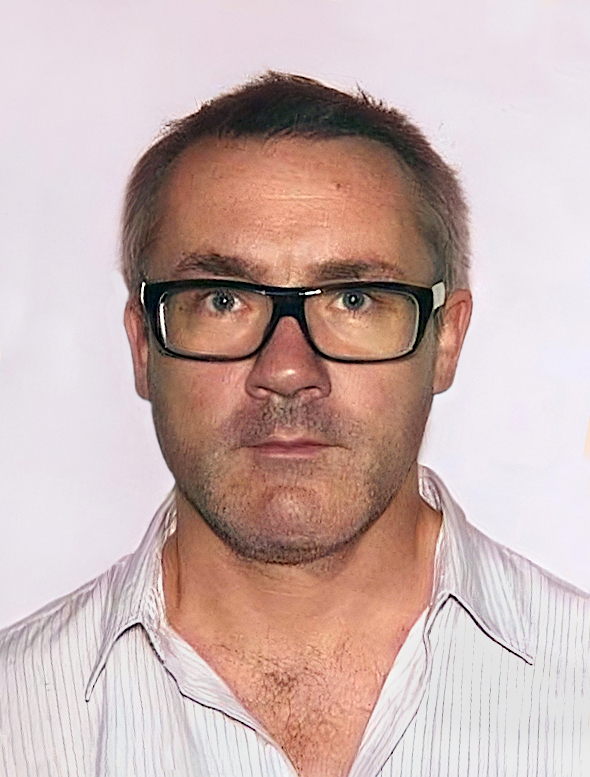
Damien Hirst by-passed galleries and sold his new work at auction.

Beautiful Inside My Head Forever was a two-day auction of new work at Sotheby's, London, taking place on 15 and 16 September 2008. It was unusual as Damien Hirst bypassed galleries and sold directly to the public. The sale raised £111 million ($198 million) for 218 items. The auction exceeded expectations, setting a record for a single-artist auction, occurring as the financial markets plunged.

The Sunday Times said that Hirst's business colleagues had "propped up" the sale prices, making purchases or bids which totalled over half of the £70.5 million spent on the first sale day: Harry Blain of the Haunch of Venison gallery said that bids were entered on behalf of clients wishing to acquire the work.

== Auction ==
In July 2008, Hirst announced the unusual move of by-passing his established galleries for his next show "Beautiful Inside My Head Forever" and instead selling the work directly to the public by auction at Sotheby's. This was the first time that an artist of his standing had put work directly into the public market rather than operating through a dealer and gallery, who charge larger commissions than auction houses—and in this sale Sotheby's waived seller's fees for Hirst.

Hirst said, "It's a very democratic way to sell art and it feels like a natural evolution for contemporary art. Although there is risk involved, I embrace the challenge of selling my work in this way." The star items were The Golden Calf, an animal with 18-carat gold horns and hooves, preserved in formaldehyde, and The Kingdom, a preserved tiger shark; other preserved animals included a zebra and a "unicorn". The sale included spot and butterfly paintings, many incorporating gold and diamonds. The Gagosian Gallery, who have sold Hirst's work for 12 years, said they would attend to make bids to buy it, and said, "As Damien's long-term gallery, we've come to expect the unexpected."

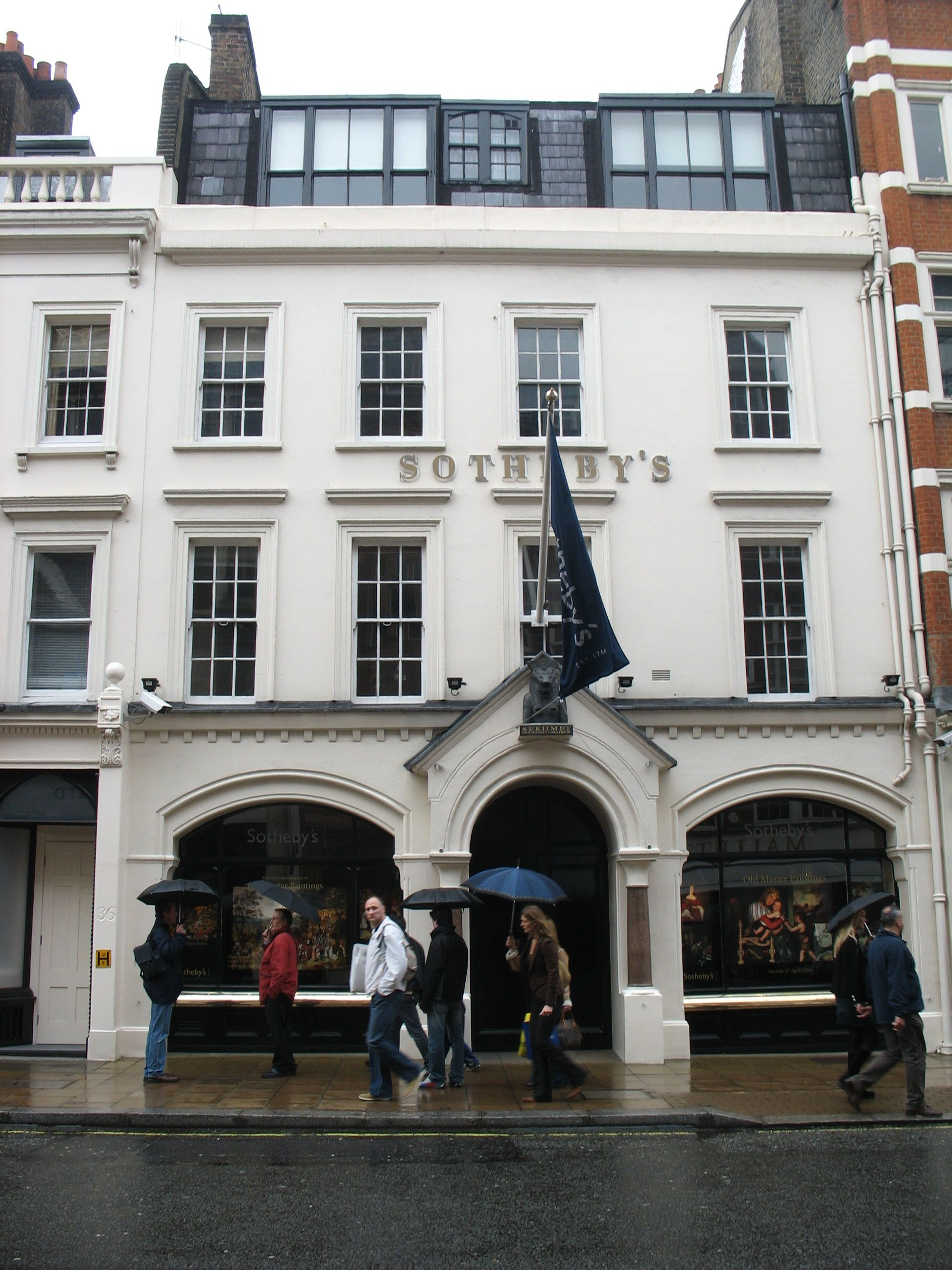
Hirst's auction, "Beautiful Inside My Head Forever", took place at Sotheby's, London

21,000 visitors viewed the show, which was restricted to 656 ticketed clients on 15 September 2008, the first night (of the two-day sale), when all 56 lots were sold for £70.5 million, exceeding the estimate of £65 million. The £10.3 million sale of The Golden Calf beat Hirst's previous auction record. The Kingdom sold for £9.6 million, more than £3 million above its estimate. The second day of the sale, taking place in the morning and afternoon, raised £41 million, making a sale total of £111 million ($198 million) for 218 items with three remaining unsold (two others were sold privately after the evening auction).

The auction was successful beyond any expectations, setting a record for a single-artist auction, and exceeding by ten times higher the existing record for the sale of a single artist's work at Sotheby's. It occurred as the financial markets plunged and on the day when Lehman Brothers went bankrupt.

=== Hirst's associates ===
The Sunday Times said that three of Hirst's business colleagues, with an interest in ensuring his work maintained a high value, had "propped up" the sale prices, making between them purchases or bids which totalled over half of the £70.5 million spent on the "crucial" initial sale day: Jay Jopling won the first lot at twice the estimate with a bid just short of £1 million, and was a high bidder on The Kingdom; his White Cube gallery was the underbidder on lots which reached an estimated £20 million. Hirst's dealer in the United States, Larry Gagosian won one lot at £880,000, and made the second highest bid for another lot which sold for £10.3 million. Harry Blain, a co-founder of the Haunch of Venison gallery which trades in Hirst's art, underbid on two items and won two, including a cabinet at £1.3 million.

The White Cube and Gagosian declined to discuss their motivations for bidding; Blain said that bids were entered on behalf of clients wishing to acquire the work. Other dealers observed that Gagosian, White Cube and Blain all have clients wishing to acquire Hirst's work. The chief executive of the Fine Art Fund, Philip Hoffman, said there was a degree of "protectionism" and that Jopling had bid for a "lousy piece", which was likely to fare badly in the sale.

== The exhibition-auction as media and marketing performance art ==
At the time and afterwards the exhibition-auction has been described as a kind of marketing and media/communications performance art. In a Guardian newspaper article, Germaine Greer said, "Damien Hirst is a brand, because the art form of the 21st century is marketing. To develop so strong a brand on so conspicuously threadbare a rationale is hugely creative - revolutionary even."

The performative nature was later addressed in the exhibition at Tate Modern, "Pop Life: Art in a material world", to which critic Ben Lewis found it very offensive: "... the gallery texts have the temerity to claim that the greed-fuelled auction sale was a work of performance art in itself. That’s just the same as Stockhausen calling 9/11 a work of art." Another kind of media intervention occurred at the time of the Sotheby's exhibition and auction, as Ben Lewis was banned from the press event. He wrote, "Only carefully vetted art critics will fill the press pen and sympathetic TV channels pack the camera podium. Several members of the press thought to be critical of Hirst has been refused accreditation – among them me."

== Aftermath ==
Colin Gleadell of The Daily Telegraph said that Gagosian, who was said to have been displeased at Hirst's decision to sell new work at auction, did not include him in a major show in Moscow.

Since the auction, Hirst has implied that contemporary art is over-priced, including his own work, whose price he plans to reduce to take account of the recession. In November, contracts were not renewed for 17 of the 22 assistants who manufacture pills for Hirst's series of drug cabinets, as well as another three who make butterfly paintings for him. Jude Tyrrell, director of Hirst's main art production company Science Ltd, said that temporary contracts had not been renewed as the result of a planned termination of certain bodies of work; Hirst had announced in July that he would cease producing medicine cabinets, as well as spin and butterfly paintings.
