= Carolina Biological Supply Company =

- Industry: Science Supplies
- Founded: 1927
- Founder: Dr. Thomas E. Powell Jr
- Headquarters: Burlington, North Carolina, United States
- Website: Official website

Carolina Biological Supply Company is a worldwide supplier of science education materials to teachers, college professors, home-school educators, and professionals in health and science-related fields.

== History ==
Carolina was founded in 1927 by Dr. Thomas E. Powell Jr., a young geology and biology professor at Elon College (now Elon University). During the 1920s, science teachers had to collect most of the materials they used in their classes and laboratories, which took considerable time away from their primary responsibilities. Like other teachers, Dr. Powell spent much of his own time in the field gathering specimens for his classes. Because he usually got more than he needed, he sold the surplus to his colleagues. His efforts grew into Carolina Biological Supply Company, as Powell foresaw a need for his collecting abilities in the coming years.

== Products ==
The company specializes in science materials for traditional K-12/college classrooms and labs. Its business units include Carolina® Curriculum, offering K-8 hands-on science kits; Carolina Science Online®, an e-learning portal with digital resources; and Carolina Distance Learning®, offering college-level lab kits for distance education.

The company sells items—from simple one-celled organisms to complex equipment—on its website. Carolina's website also offers free classroom activities and other resources for educators. The company’s main facility is in Burlington, North Carolina, U.S.
