= Statue of Henryk Jankowski =

Toppled statue in Gdańsk, Poland

- Pomnik Henryka Jankowskiego (Polish)
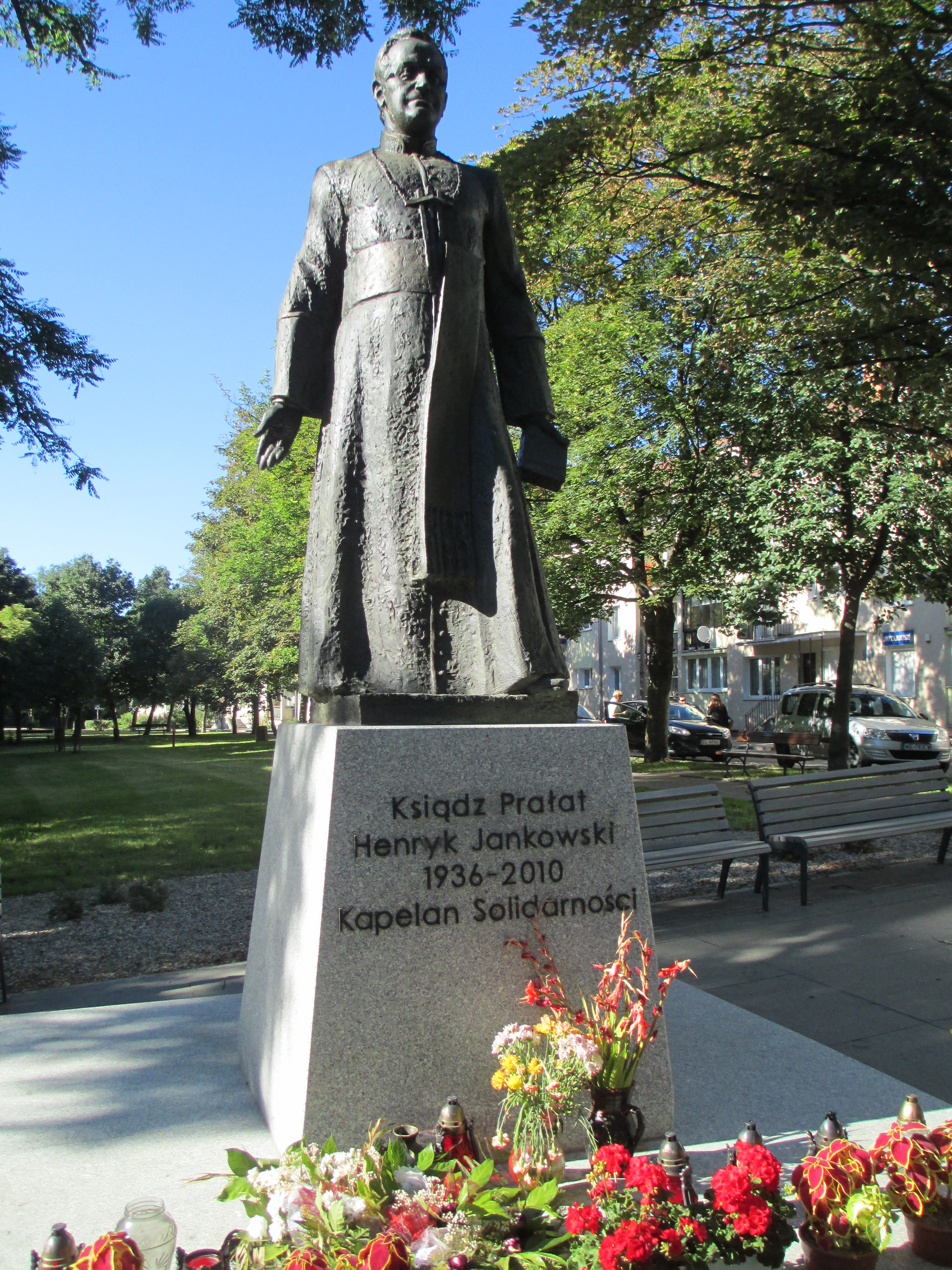
- The statue in 2013
- Artist: Giennadij Jerszow
- Completion date: 12 August 2012
- Dimensions: 2.5 m (8.2 ft)
- Condition: Removed, 2019
- Location: Skwer Gyddanyzc Stare Miasto, Gdańsk; 54.3547°N 18.6532°E

The statue of Henryk Jankowski (Polish: Pomnik Henryka Jankowskiego) was a statue in Gdańsk, Poland, dedicated to Catholic priest and provost Henryk Jankowski. It was designed by Giennadij Jerszow, and was unveiled in 2012, and removed in 2019, after Jankowski was accused of pedophilia and child rape.

== History ==
=== Construction ===
The statue was created because of the initiative of the Social Committee for the Construction of the Statue of Priest Henryk Jankowski, which managed to raise 136,772 zł in funds for the project. It was also funded and supported by Solidarity activists from across Poland. Its creator was Giennadij Jerszow, a Ukrainian artist and a friend of the priest. It was officially christened on 31 August 2012 by Archbishop of Gdańsk Sławoj Leszek Głódź, who was its ceremonial patron.

=== Removal ===
On 3 December 2018, for Duży Format, a weekly supplement to Gazeta Wyborcza, journalist Bożena Aksamit wrote an article entitled "The secret of Saint Bridget's. Why did the Church allow Father Jankowski to abuse children for years?" After the publication of the report, member of the Sejm Joanna Scheuring-Wielgus sent a letter to mayor of Gdańsk Paweł Adamowicz requesting the removal of the statue.

On the night of 5/6 December 2018, the statue was doused with red paint, and on 7 December, a protest took place, during which the statue was surrounded with a chain, to which a plank was bound with an inscription reading Monument of victims of the KK (Pomnik ofiar KK), with the KK standing for Kościół Katolicki, meaning "Catholic Church" in Polish.

On 21 February 2019, around 3:00 a.m., the statue was toppled by three men: Michał Wojcieszczuk, Rafał Suszek, and Konrad Korzeniowski. The statue fell onto previously-placed tyres so that it would not be destroyed, as, according to the perpetrators, the goal was "the shattering of the false and disgusting myth of Henryk Jankowski, and not the matter of the statue." On the fallen statue, the clothes of an altar server were placed along with a pair of children's underwear. The three men, accused of civil disobedience, waited for police to come.

After the incident, the toppled statue was planned to be removed by the city government of Gdańsk, but the funders protested, so it was handed back to the Social Committee. On 21 and 22 February 2019, graffiti reading "pedophile", "support the victims", and "evil" appeared on the empty pedestal. On the morning of 23 February, the statue was returned to its pedestal against the orders of the city government and was to be guarded by police officers. On 8 March 2019, the statue was removed in accordance with orders of the Gdańsk City Council. However, the pedestal remained in place.

The men who had toppled the statue were officially accused of the crime on 28 September 2021. The act was classified as an act of lesser weight, without significant harm to society. The topplers were initially asked to pay 7,000 zł in damages to the Social Committee. They were proven innocent on 7 November 2022.
