= Polonica.net =

Polish antisemitic web portal

- Website type: Web portal
- Available in: Polish
- Creator: Many authors
- Website: Copy of Polonica.net on the Internet
- Commercial: No
- Registration: No
- Launched: 2002

Polonica.net was a Polish anti-Jewish right-wing web portal established in 2002 and endorsed by the Polish Catholic National Resistance Movement Against Judaisation and Depolonization, the Polish Patriotic Union and the Worldwide Movement of Catholic National Avant-garde. The portal was closed in 2010.

== Contents ==
The web portal presented articles (mainly written by Polish Catholic priest Henryk Jankowski - whom was banned from preaching for a year after he said Poles should not tolerate a Jewish minority in the Polish government) propagating anti-Semitism, as well as a "List of Jews in Oppressed Poland" ("Lista zydow w zniewalanej Polsce"), which showed so-called "real Jewish surnames" of many well-known Polish public people next to their "new" Polish surnames, including their biographies dating back to the period before the Second World War. Journalist Adam Michnik, historian and politician Bronisław Geremek, former president Aleksander Kwaśniewski, and former Prime Minister Tadeusz Mazowiecki appeared on that list.

The list was an inspiration for poster titled "Żydzi won z katolickiego kraju" ("Jews, get out of a Catholic country!") by Polish Street art artist Peter Fuss. The poster was displayed in Koszalin in 2007 with the aim of encouraging people to see an exhibition on Anti-Semitism. The exhibition caused great controversies and was closed before opening by the police.

In the section "Red Resumes", columnists of the portal presented "true resumes" of Polish politicians including their "real" Jewish surnames. For example, ex-president of Poland Aleksander Kwaśniewski was presented as Izaak Stoltzman, and Jacek Kuroń as Icek Kordblum. The list also included Donald Tusk, Ludwik Dorn, Lech Kaczyński, Lech Wałęsa, Adam Michnik, Monika Olejnik, Sebastian Imbierowicz, or even Dorota Rabczewska, Gosia Andrzejewicz, Jolanta Rutowicz and Henryk Batuta (a fictional person).

Apart from that we could find articles titled like "Schedule of the fight against Jews", "Antypolonizm", "United States under Jewish control", "Inconvenient truth about roots of the Jewish nation", The web portal also published anti-Jewish pamphlets and articles translated into Polish like The International Jew written by American industrialist and automobile manufacturer Henry Ford.

== Main statement ==
A statement that Poland and its economy remained under control of people of Jewish origin was a predominant thematic feature of the portal. On the main page one could read that these people aspire to destroy Polish tradition, as well as being against social conservatism and a strong position of the Roman Catholic Church. According to the authors of Polonica.net, people of Jewish origin were the main threat to Poland and its independence, therefore the web portal supported the idea of expelling Jews from Poland once and for all.

== Closing ==
The portal was shut down in 2010 although there were attempts to shut down the portal by Polish police since 2007 without success. The reason for that was that polonica.net was installed on American server and the administrator of portal was outside the country.
