= Henryk Jankowski =

Polish Catholic priest, chaplain of "Solidarity" (1936–2010)

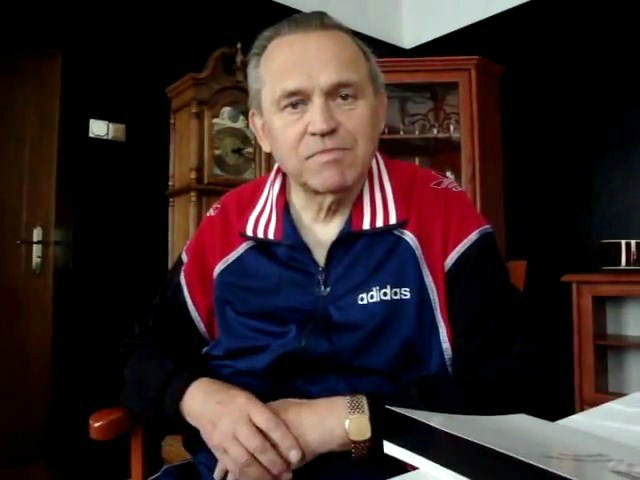
- Jankowski in 2010.
- Title: Provost of St. Bridget's Church, Gdańsk

Personal life
- Born: 18 December 1936 Starogard, Pomeranian Voivodeship, Second Polish Republic
- Died: 12 July 2010 (aged 73) Gdańsk, Pomeranian Voivodeship, Third Polish Republic

Religious life
- Religion: Roman Catholic
- Ordination: 1964

Senior posting
- Post: Provost of St. Bridget's Church, Gdańsk

Father Henryk Jankowski (18 December 1936 in Starogard – 12 July 2010 in Gdańsk) was a Polish Roman Catholic priest, member of Solidarity movement and one of the priests supporting that movement in opposition to the communist government in the 1980s. He was also a long serving provost of St. Bridget's church in Gdańsk (until 2004). In the late 1990s he became known for his critique of the European Union and for antisemitic remarks, and was suspended from preaching for a year. Father Jankowski was accused of being a pedophile and child rapist but was never convicted. The issue is still being investigated, remains a matter of discussion and an object of press's interest.

According to records saved in Instytut Pamięci Narodowej Henryk Jankowski since 1980 to 1982 was an operational contact codename "Delegat" of communist Służba Bezpieczeństwa.

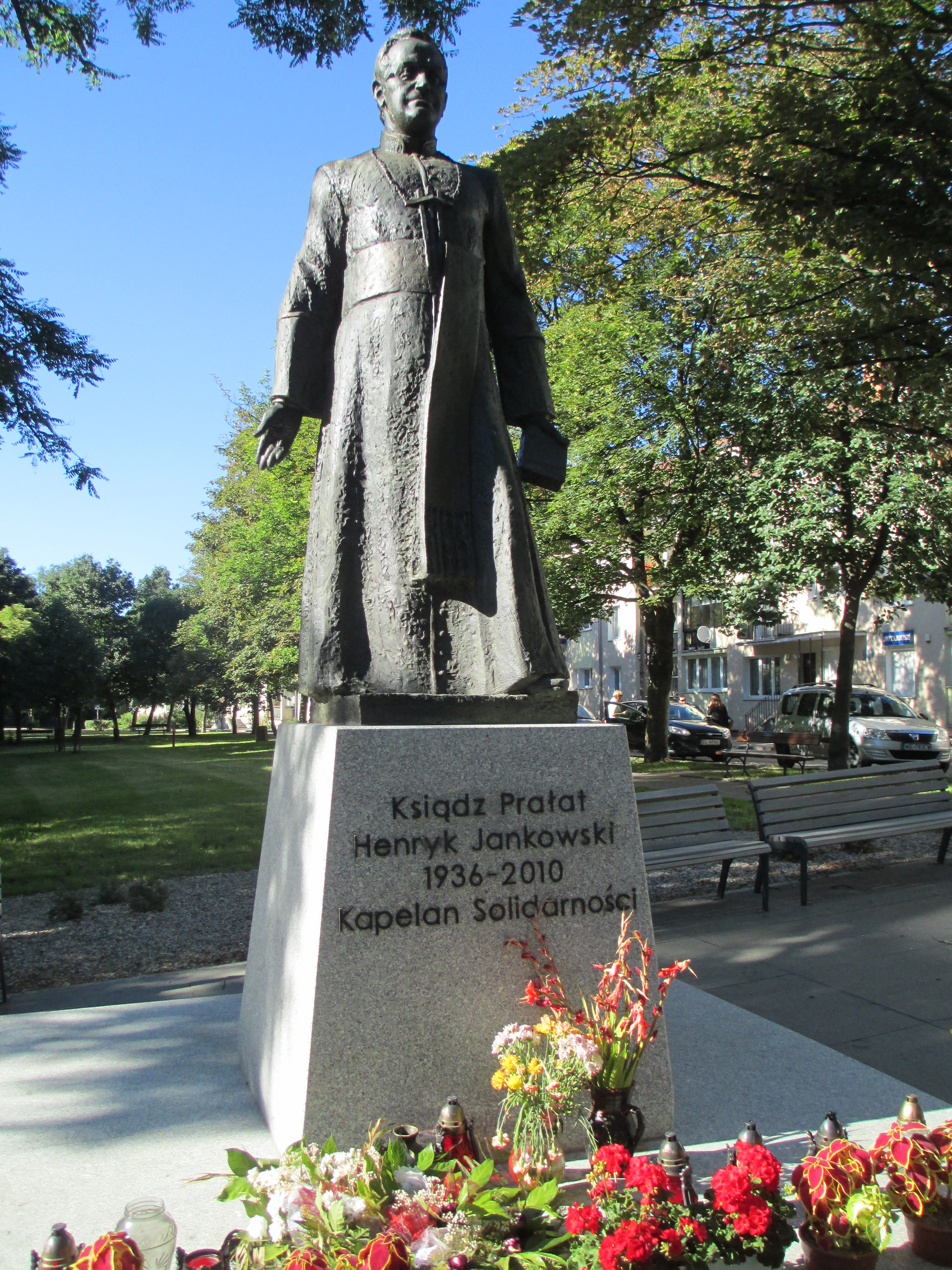
Former statue of Henryk Jankowski by Giennadij Jerszow in Gdańsk

He supported the Father Henryk Jankowski Institute, described as supporting charities and social projects, by sales of a wine with his image on the label, sold under the name "Monsignore", and had plans to open a chain of 16 cafés in major Polish cities and to market perfume and clothing also bearing his image.

In February 2019, the Henryk Jankowski monument in Gdańsk was toppled by a group of protestors and ultimately liquidated on 8 March 2019.

== See also ==
- Radio Maryja
- Polonica.net
- Catholic sex abuse cases
