= Giennadij Jerszow =

Polish and Ukrainian sculptor (born 1967)

Gennadij Jerszow
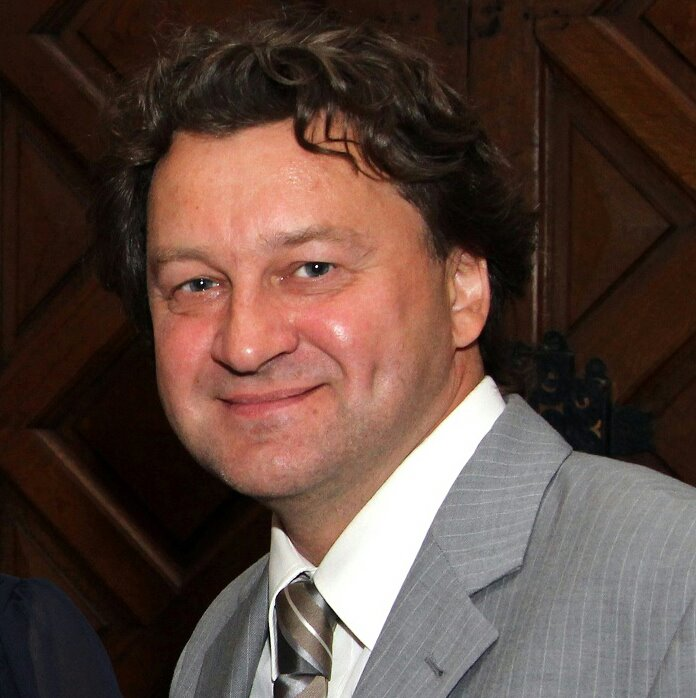
- Jerszow in 2011
- Born: Hennadiy Oleksiyovych Yershov; 12 July 1967 (age 59); Chernihiv, Ukrainian SSR, Soviet Union
- Education: National Academy of Visual Arts and Architecture; Lviv Academy of Arts
- Known for: Sculpture
- Notable work: Vaslav and Bronislava Nijinska in the Grand Theatre, Warsaw; Monument to the Council of Princes in Liubech; Monument to Hetman Mazepa (Chernihiv); Monument to Pope John Paul II, "Radio MARIA"; Monument to Vladimir the Great (Gdańsk)
- Movement: Figurative art, Realism, Portrait
- Awards: Medal "Pro Opere Politissima Arte Perfecto"

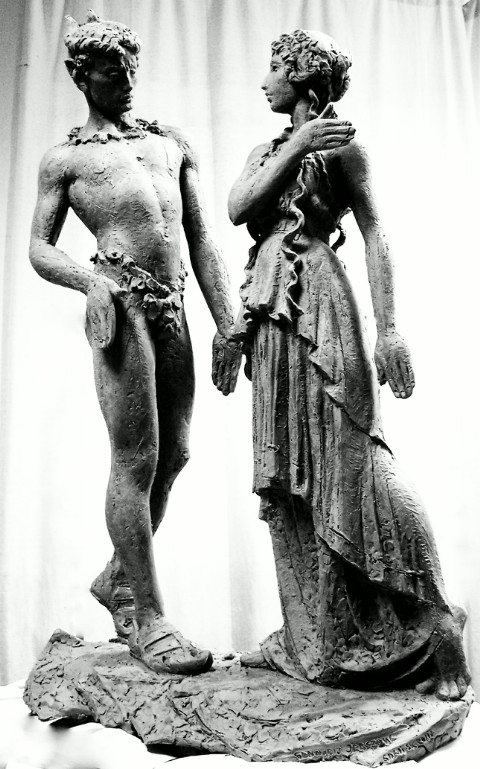
Vaslav Nijinsky and Bronislava Nijinska

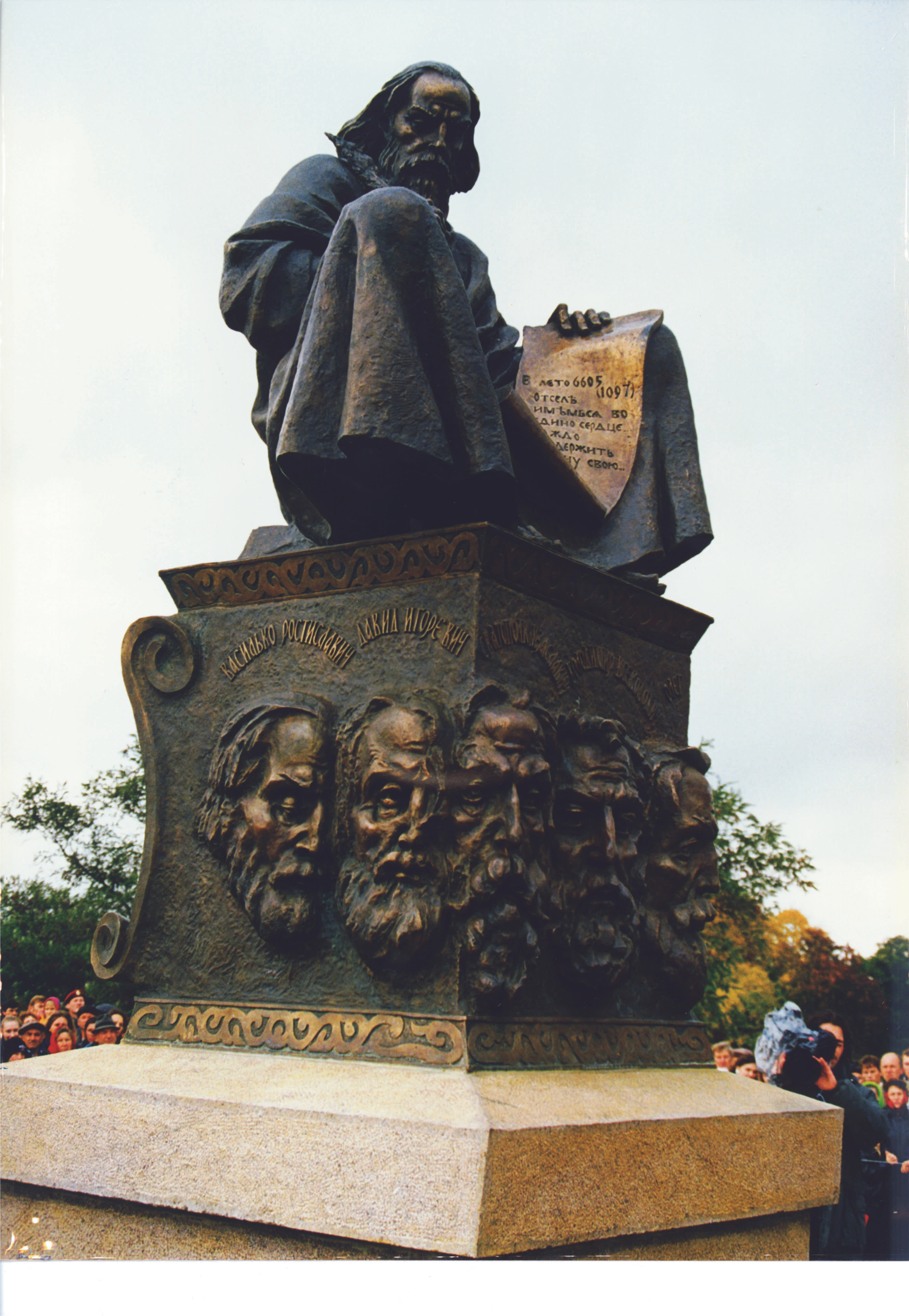
The Council of Liubech Chronicler

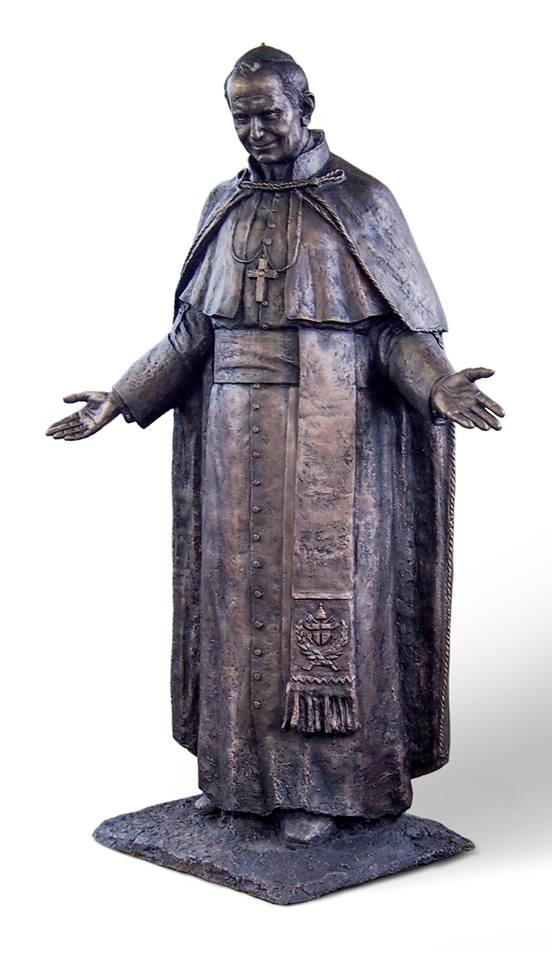
Pope John Paul II

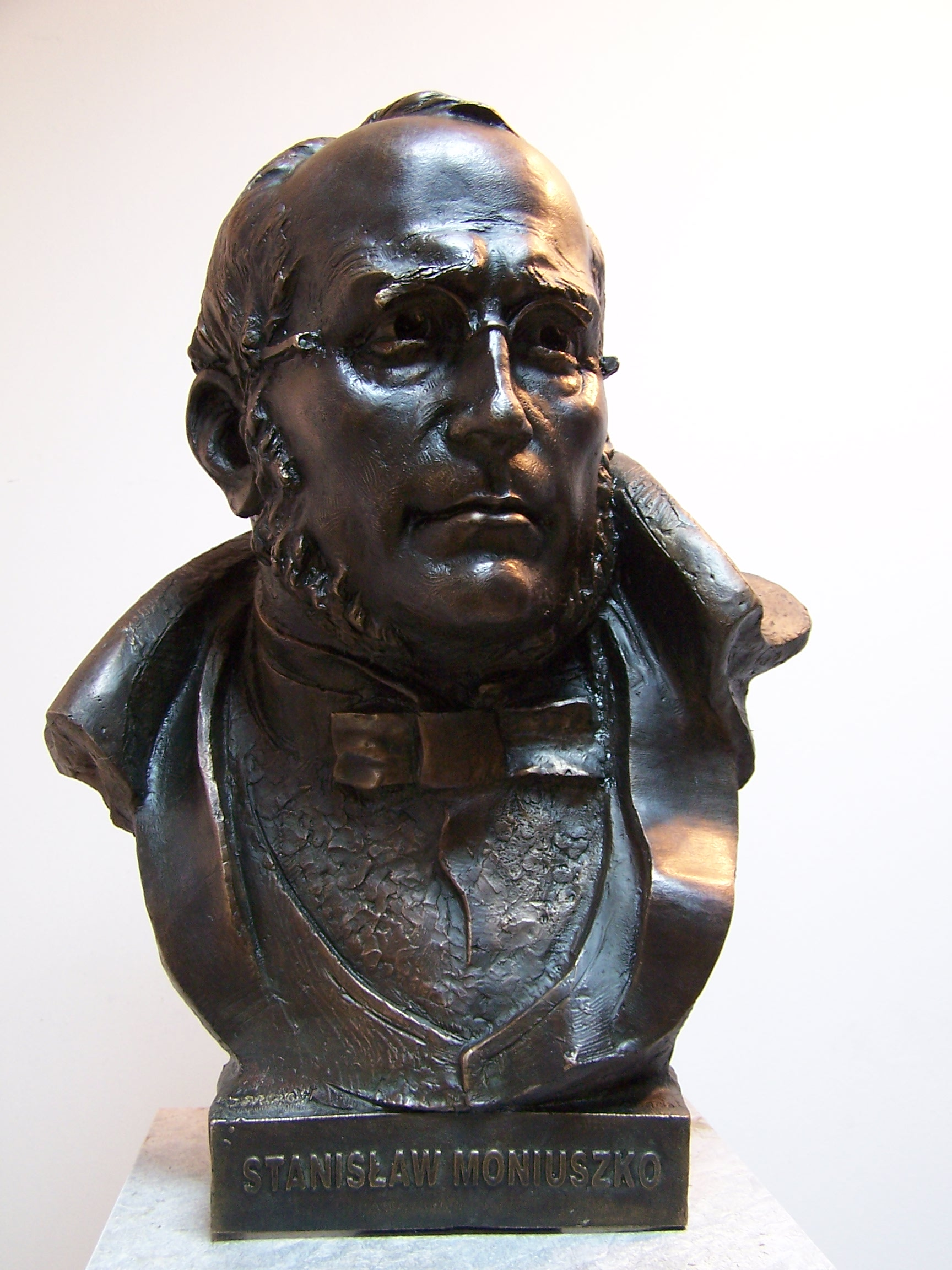
Stanisław Moniuszko

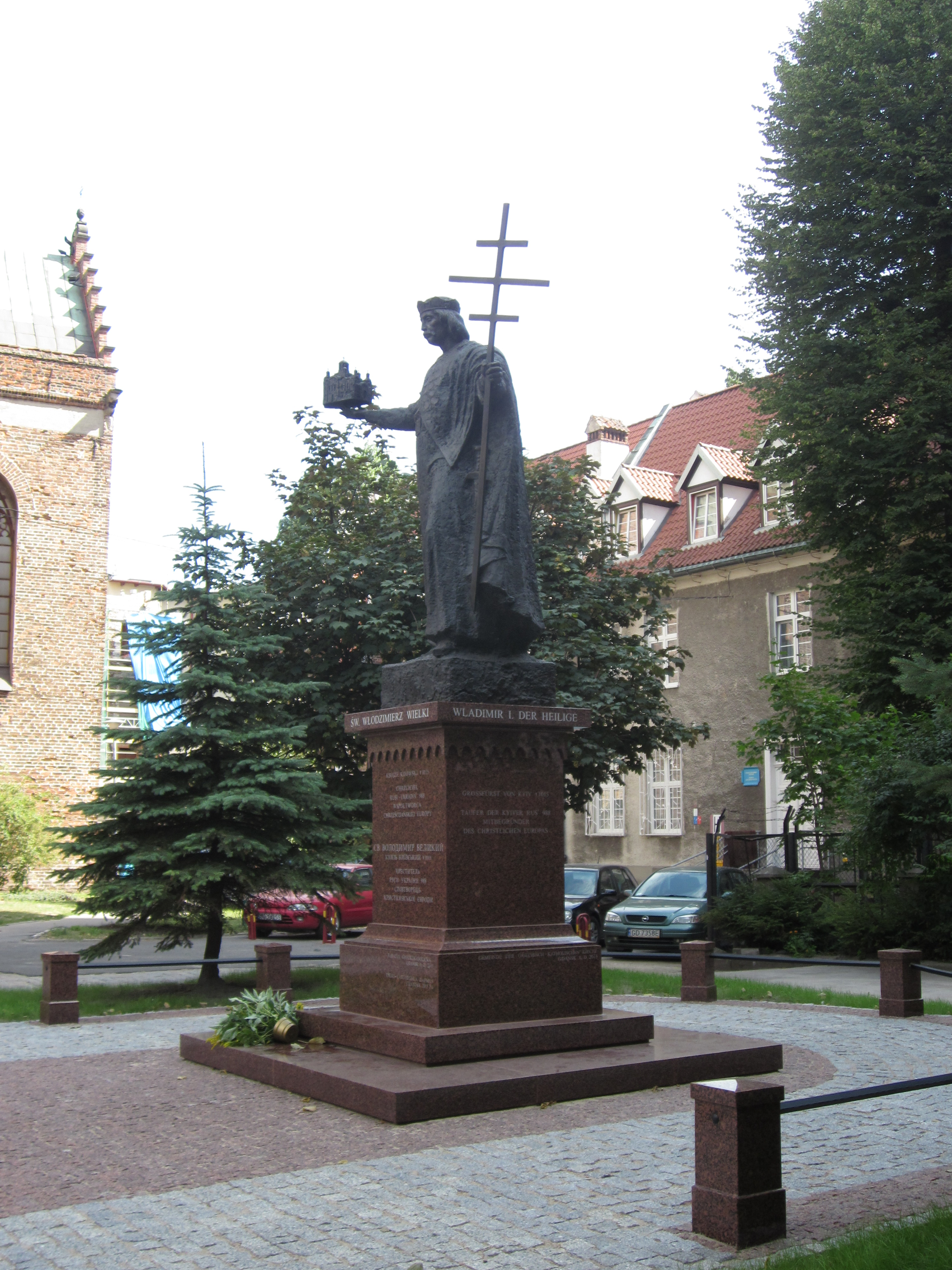
Volodymyr the Great

Giennadij Jerszow (Polish pronunciation: [ɡʲɛnˈnadij ˈjɛrʂɔf]; (Note: Ukrainian: Геннадій Олексійович Єршов, romanized: Hennadiy Oleksiyovych Yershov, IPA: [ɦeˈnːɑd⁽ʲ⁾ij olekˈs⁽ʲ⁾ijowɪtʃ jerˈʃɔu̯]; Russian: Геннадий Алексеевич Ершов, romanized: Gennadiy Alekseevich Ershov, IPA: [ɡʲɪˈnadʲɪj ɐlʲɪkˈsʲejɪvɪtɕ jɪrˈʂof].) born 12 July 1967) is a Polish–Ukrainian sculptor, jewelry designer and art teacher. He is a member of the National Union of Artists of Ukraine, and the National Association of Polish Artists and Designers. He is known for the production of monumental works, easel compositions and portraits, represented in different countries.

== Biography ==
Jerszow was born on 12 July 1967 in Chernihiv in Ukrainian SSR, Soviet Union (today Ukraine) in a mixed Polish–Ukrainian family. As a repatriate he acquired Polish citizenship and his family moved in 2001 to Poland, where he currently resides in the city of Gdańsk. Being brought up in a multinational family, he is fluent in Russian, Ukrainian and Polish, and gained a love for the history and culture of different nationalities. During his school years (1974–1982), he was engaged in gymnastics and judo. He graduated from a music school in the class of bass guitar, and began to show interest in photography. Following the family tradition, he planned to become a doctor. In 1986 he graduated from medical college, received a medical education (bachelor degree) in the specialty of paramedic; he then worked for two years in medical institutions. During his training, he became interested in wood carving and jewelry, took part in regional exhibitions. At the all-Union competition-exhibition of the folk art of the USSR held in Livadia in 1985 he was awarded with the "Small Medal of the Laureate". While working in medicine, he expanded the boundaries of knowledge of human psychology; as a result, he decided to change the direction and devote himself to art. He took up drawing and sculpture, moved to Kyiv in 1986 to attend the studio of fine arts of George Khusid, where he took up portraits and prepared for entrance exams at the art university.

== Education ==
From 1988 to 1991, Jerszow studied at the Lviv Academy of Arts at the department of monumental sculpture in the group of Emanuel Mysko. At the same time, he began to study privately and work in the workshop of Anatoly Galyan, where he gained practical experience in creating monumental works at all stages of realization. He subsequently he trained at the Ukrainian Academy of Arts faculty of sculpture and worked in a workshop of Valery Shvetsov and academician Vasyl Borodai. In 1995, he defended his diploma on historical and religious topics relating to Ancient Rus' – "Monument to Holy Prince Mikhail and Boyar Fedor".

== Teaching ==
- 1996 – 1999 assistant and seniority at (NAVAA) National Academy of Visual Arts and Architecture, his supervisor was an Academician Vasyl Borodai. He began cooperation with a historian Vladimir Kovalenko and an academician Petro Tolochko, at the same time published articles in scientific journals. He created a program to perpetuate historical figures and events of the 17–18 centuries (based on historical materials of the Northern Part of the Left Bank of Ukraine). He created a series of projects dedicated to national heroes. The image of Ivan Mazepa was later embodied in bronze and was the first monument in Ukraine dedicated to the hetman – philanthropist.
- 1999 – 2000 Senior Lecturer at the Faculty of Fine Arts. National University "Chernihiv Collegium" named after T. G. Shevchenko. Chernihiv, Ukraine.
- 2003 – 2004 Teacher of sculpture and metal plastics. Composition of connected plastic schools. Gdynia – Orlovo, Poland.

== Creative method ==
The sculptor works in a realistic style. The elaborate details are combined with lively textured sculpting and graceful lines, which makes the composition easy and dynamic. The artist carefully selects themes for his works. Throughout his creative career, he has been creating portraits and figurines of artists and scientists, religious figures and politicians, creating images of famous people from the world of ballet, music and fashion. Thanks to direct contact with contemporaries, he conveys the unique spirit and energy of his heroes. The gallery of a modern portrait is presented by President of Poland Lech Wałęsa, Pope John Paul II, Patriarch of Ukraine Filaret, Protestant pastor Roman Jan Pawlas, Georgian Director Guram Petriashvili, English singer-songwriter and composer Ken Hensley (Uriah Heep), Polish scholar Andrzej Ceynowa, artists: Evhen Karas, Vlad Dimyon, Yuri Olishkevych (United States), female images "Olga", "Barbara", "Anastasia", as well as the artist's children "Wanda" and "Ostap". The sculptor's works are distinguished by sensuality and emotionality, in each piece of work he conveys the individuality, mood and inner world of a person. As a material he uses bronze, ceramics, silver. He owns workshops in Gdańsk (Poland) and Chernihiv (Ukraine). He is the founder of the private gallery "FART", which has been engaged in the production and sale of sculptural works since 1995.

Categories

- Monumental sculpture (monuments, memorials, busts, statues)
- Easel sculpture (portrait, figurative sculpture, composition)
- Sculpture of small forms (Figurines)
- Reliefs
- Jewelry work

Genres

- Portrait (in the collection are portraits of artists and scientists, religious figures and politicians, historical heroes and contemporaries)
- Sacred art (statues, reliefs, jewelry in silver)
- Historical genre (the artist created a number of monumental works dedicated to historical events and characters)
- Figurative art

== Solo exhibitions ==
- 1994 – Borisoglebsky Cathedral Chernihiv.
- 1996 – DK, Slavutich.
- 1997 – Central House of Artists, Kyiv.
- 1998 – "A Look into the History". Museum of History and Fine Arts, (Muzeul de Istorie şi Artă al Municipiului Bucureşti) Bucharest.
- 1998 – Ukrainian House, Kyiv.
- 1998 – The National Bank of Ukraine, Kyiv.
- 1998 – National Palace of Ukraine, Kyiv.
- 2004 – Gallery of the Art College, Gdynia.
- 2004 – Historical Museum of Gdańsk (Old Town Hall), Gdańsk.
- 2005 – Baltic Sea Culture Center, Gdańsk.
- 2005 – Diocesan Museum, Pelplin.
- 2014 – Borisoglebsky Cathedral, Chernihiv.
- 2017 – Gallery of the Union of Artists, Gdańsk.

== Famous works ==
- 1996 – memorial to the victims of the Chernobyl disaster (bronze, granite). Chernihiv, Ukraine;
- 1997 – Monument to the Council of Liubech- to the 900th anniversary of the First Congress of Princes of Kievan Rus' (bronze, granite). Liubech, Ukraine;
- 1998 – Monument to Taras Shevchenko (Bucharest) (marble, granite), Herastrau Park, Bucharest, Romania;
- 2002 – "The Archangel Raphael and Tobias", figurative bas-relief, hospice. Gdańsk, Poland;
- 2002 – "The Apostle Jude Thaddaeus" figure, hospice. Gdańsk, Poland;
- 2003 – memorial plaque – portrait of Pallottine priest Eugeniusz Dutkiewicz (bronze), hospice. Gdańsk, Poland;
- 2004 – a plaque – a portrait of Julian Rummel, one of the founders of Gdynia – on the facade of the headquarters of the Polish Navy (bronze). Gdynia, Poland;
- 2005 – Figurines "Orpheus", for laureates of the General Polish dance competition named after Woytek Lowski named after Woytek Lowski;
- 2005 – Grand Prix WOYTEK depicting a famous dancer in the role of "Hamlet" Poland;
- 2005 – a plaque – a portrait of Janina Jarzynowna-Sobczak, founder of the ballet school in Gdańsk (bronze). Gdańsk, Poland;
- 2006 – monument to Taras Shevchenko (bronze, granite), on the territory of ChSPU named after T. G. Shevchenko. Chernihiv, Ukraine;
- 2005–2006 – "The way of the Cross" – 15 relief images (bronze) – Basilica of the Assumption of the Virgin Mary. Gdańsk, Poland;
- 2008 – monument to Peter Prokopovich, (bronze, granite). Palchyky, Chernihiv region;
- 2007–2008 — "Stations of the Cross" — 14 reliefs (bronze) — Church of St. Anthony. Toruń, Poland;
- 2007 "Stanislaw Moniuszko" portrait – bust of the composer (bronze). The Stanislaw Moniuszko Academy of Music in Gdańsk, Poland;
- 2008 "Frederic Chopin" portrait – bust of the composer (bronze). Polish Baltic F.Chopin Philharmonic in Gdańsk, Poland;
- 2009 – Monument to Krzysztof Celestyn Mrongovius (bronze, granite). The University of Gdańsk. Gdańsk, Poland;
- 2009 – Monument to Hetman Mazepa (Chernihiv)(bronze, marble). Chernihiv, Ukraine;
- 2009 – Memorial sign "to Victims of Holodomor 1932–1933" (bronze, granite). Warsaw, Poland;
- 2009 – Monument to major Hieronim Dekutowski, alias Zapora" (bronze, granite). Tarnobrzeg, Poland;
- 2009 – the fountain "Roses", Central Square. Tarnobrzeg, Poland;
- 2010 – memorial on the site of the papal altar, in honour of the Holy mass with the participation of Pope John Paul II at Zaspa in Gdańsk on 12 June 1987. Gdańsk, Poland;
- 2010 – "Stations of the Cross" – 14 reliefs (bronze, wood). Parish of the Exaltation of the Holy Cross in Gdańsk;
- 2011 – figures – "Vaslav Nijinsky and Bronislava Nijinska" (bronze).The Great Theatre – National Opera. Warsaw, Poland;
- 2012 – monument to the Chaplain of "Solidarity" Henryk Jankowski. Gdańsk, Poland;
- 2014 – monument to Pope John Paul II. "Radio MARIA". Toruń, Poland;
- 2014 – memorial plaque – portrait of the composer Feliks Nowowiejski, music school patron (bronze). Gdańsk, Poland;
- 2014 – figure "Ken Hensley" (Uriah Heep) English singer – songwriter and composer (bronze, marble). Alicante, Spain;
- 2014 – figure "Arthur Schopenhauer" monument path implementation;
- 2014 – "Stations of the Cross" – 14 reliefs (bronze). Askold's Grave. Kyiv, Ukraine;
- 2015 – the Monument to Vladimir the Great (Gdańsk). Gdańsk, Poland;
- 2016 – the Monument to the victims of Martial law in Poland. Gdańsk, Poland;
- 2017 – The Sarcophagus of Bishops of Pelpin. Bronze relief shutters depict angels and heraldry. Cathedral Basilica of the Assumption. Pelplin, Poland;
- 2018 -2020 – series of portrait statues dedicated to the prominent people of art.

== Customers ==
Opening of the monuments took place with the participation of

- Presidents of Ukraine Leonid Kuchma and Viktor Yushchenko, President of Poland Lech Kaczynski,
- Vice - Prime Minister of Ukraine Valeriy Smoliy,
- Ministers of culture of Poland Waldemar Dąbrowski and Romania Ion Karatu,
- Marshal of the Polish Senate Bogdan Borusewicz,
- Archbishops Tadeusz Gocłowski, Sławoj Leszek Głódź, bishop Andrzej Suski, Ryszard Kasyna, Włodzimierz Juszczak,
- Presidents of cities Wojciech Szczurek, Paweł Adamowicz, Jan Dziubinski, mayor of Bucharest Viorel Lis.

Among the customers were state and public institutions

- Chernihiv City Council; Gdańsk City Council; Tarnobrzeg City Council.
- Embassy of Ukraine in Bucharest and in Warsaw.
- Headquarters of the Navy of Poland – Gdynia.
- Basilica of the Assumption of the Virgin Mary – Gdańsk;
- Basilica of St. Brigida – Gdańsk;
- "Radio Maria" Toruń.
- Archdiocese of Gdańsk, Diocese of Pelplin, Diocese of Toruń.
- University of Gdańsk;
- Chernihiv National University. after T.G. Shevchenko;
- Historical reserve "Ancient Val" – Chernihiv;
- Historical reserve "Ancient Liubech".
- Polish Baltic Philharmonic named after Frederic Chopin;
- Stanislav Monyushko Academy of Music in Gdańsk;
- Ballet School – Gdańsk;
- The Great Theatre – National Opera in Warsaw.
- Also private companies and corporations.
- Works are located in museums and private collections ..

== Awards and honors ==
- Church awards: Medal "PRO OPERE POLITISSIMA ARTE PERFECTO" by Primate of Poland Cardinal Jozef Glemp
- Public Awards: Badge of Honor "Golden Jewel of the Mazepa Family"

== Personal life ==
He is the father of three children: Philip born in 1989, Wanda born in 1995, Eustathius (Ostap) born in 1998.

== Gallery ==
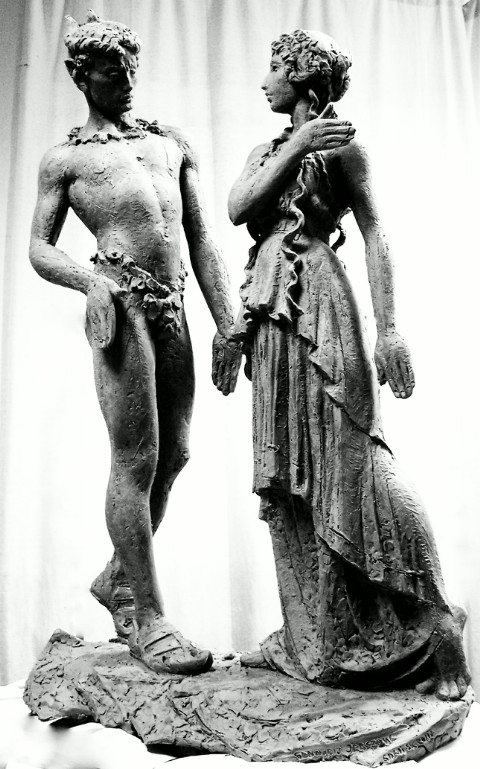
Sculpture of Vaslav and Bronislava Nijinska by Giennadij Jerszow in the Grand Theatre in Warsaw

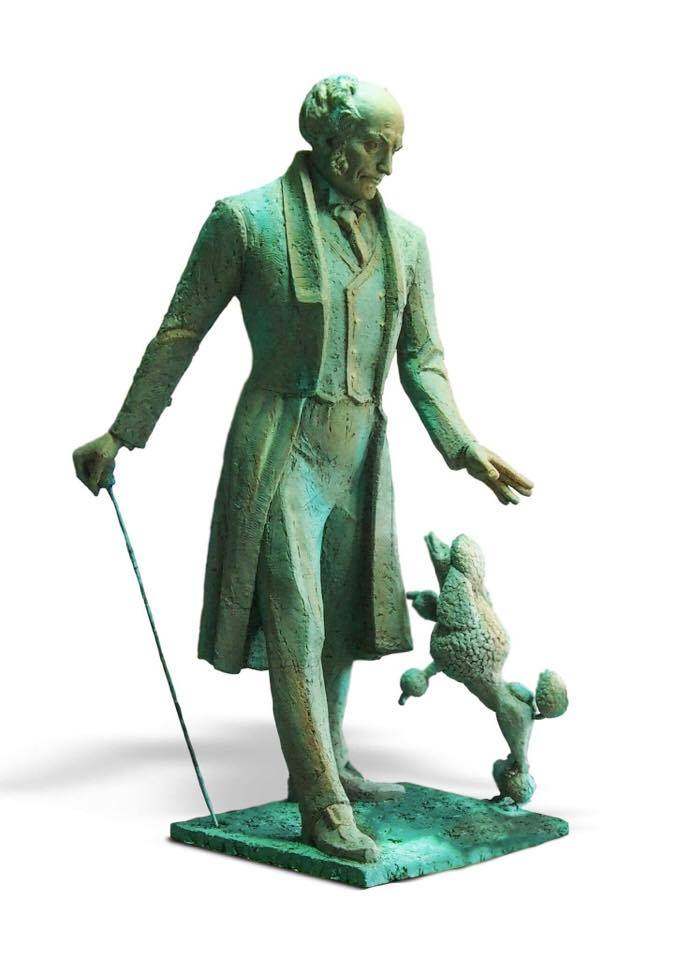
Arthur Schopenhauer

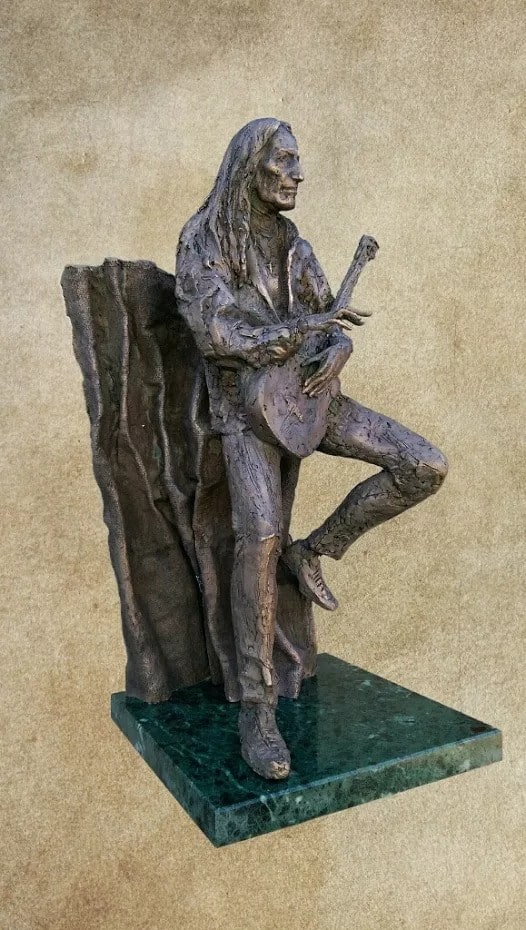
Portrait Ken Hensley. Alicante, Spanish 2014

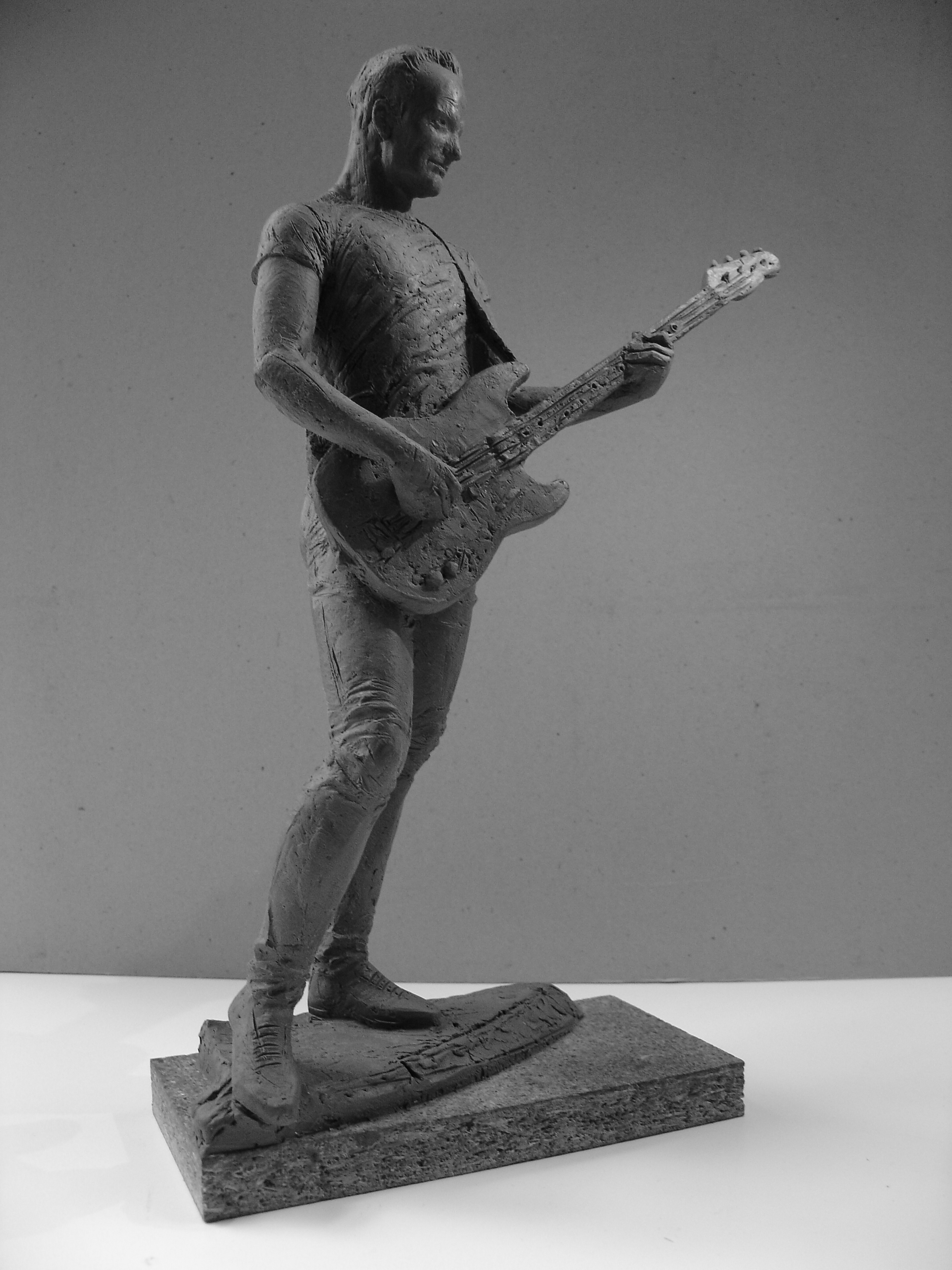
STING 2020

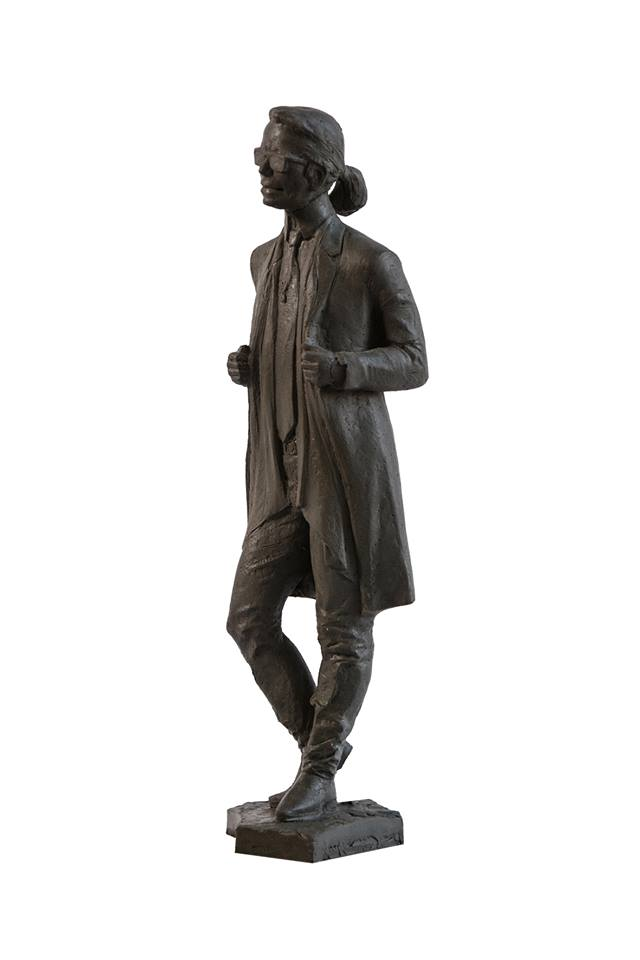
Karl Lagerfeld 2019

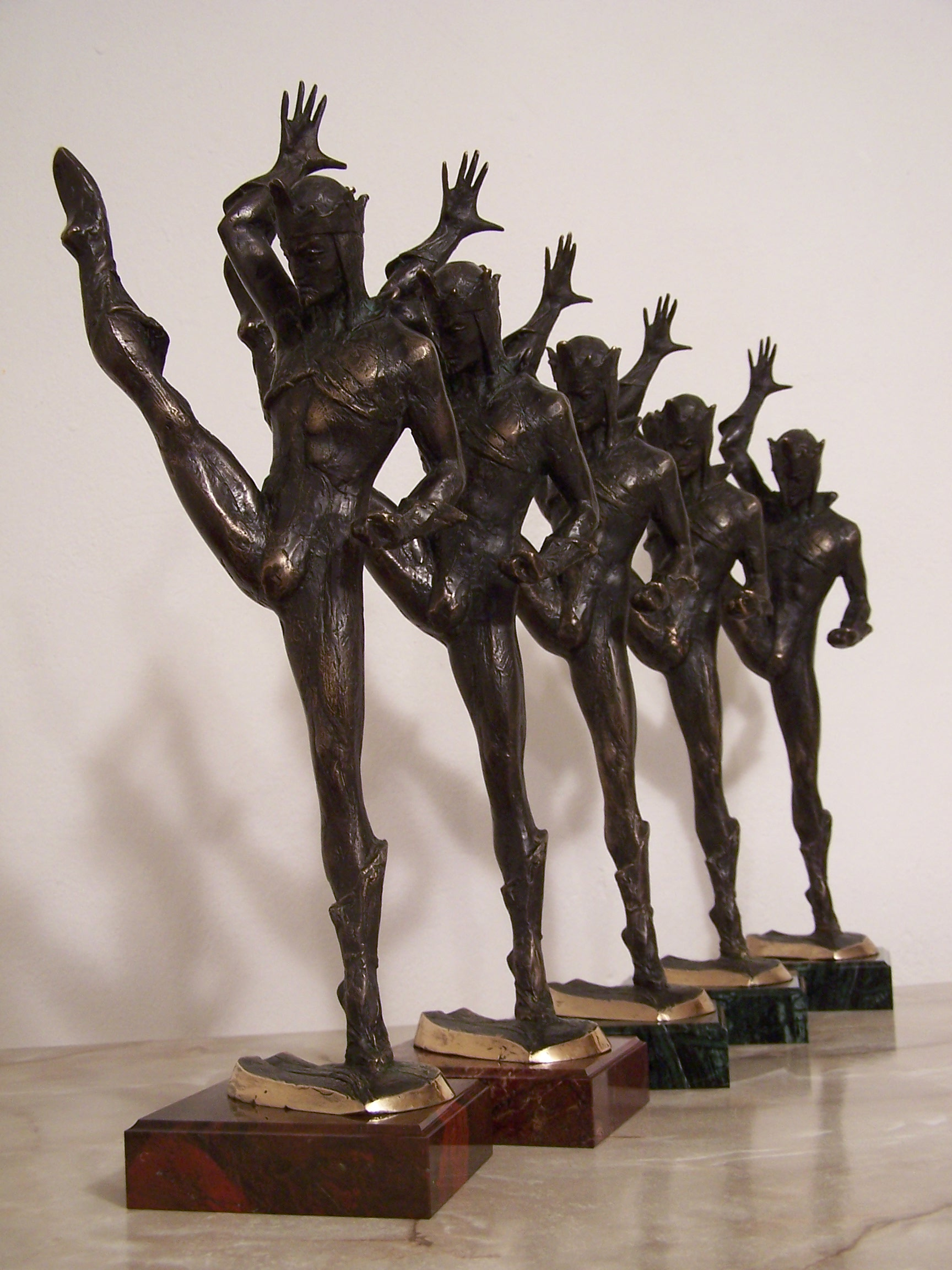
Grand Prix WOYTEK

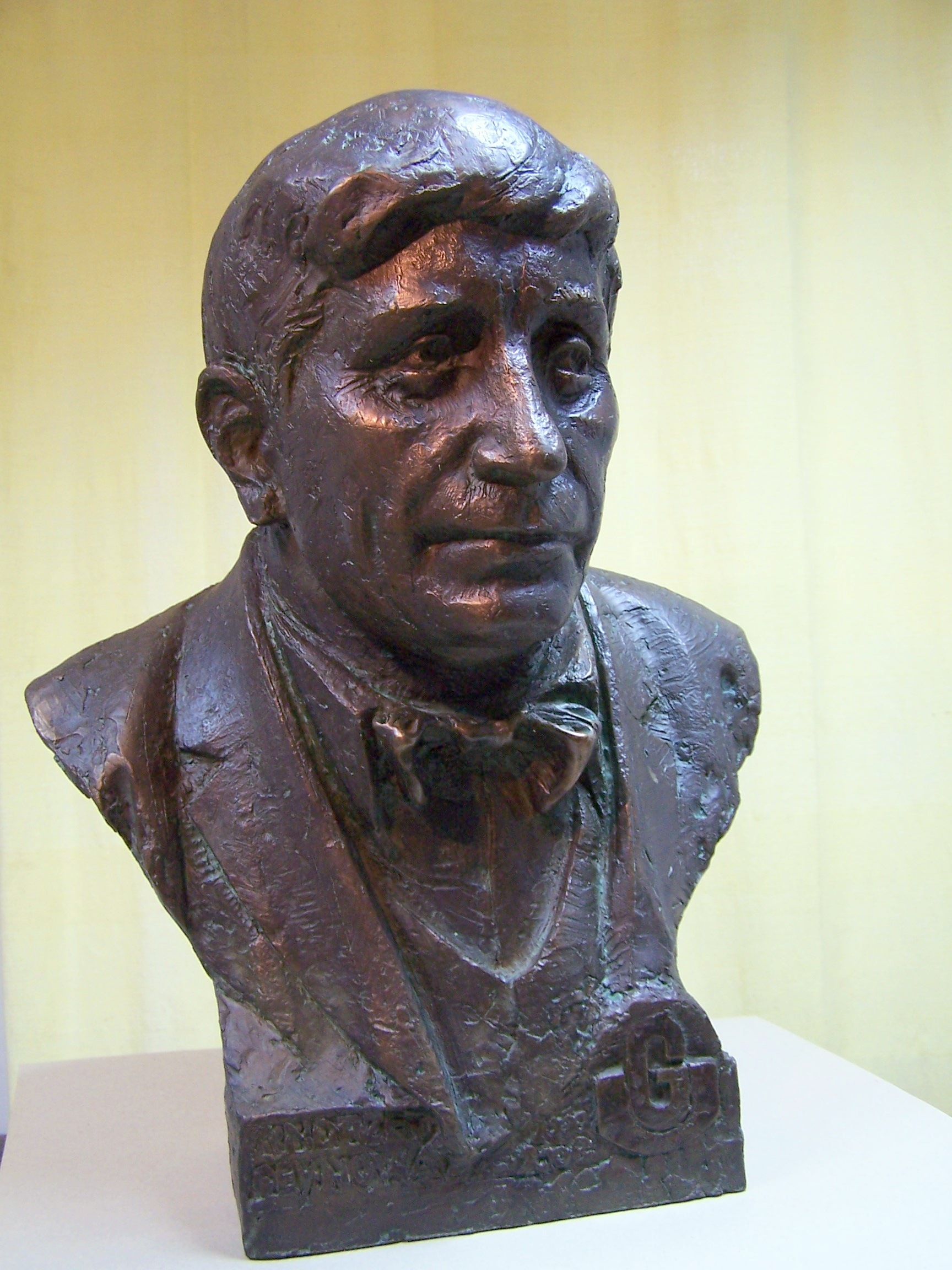
Andrzej Ceynowa Gdańsk

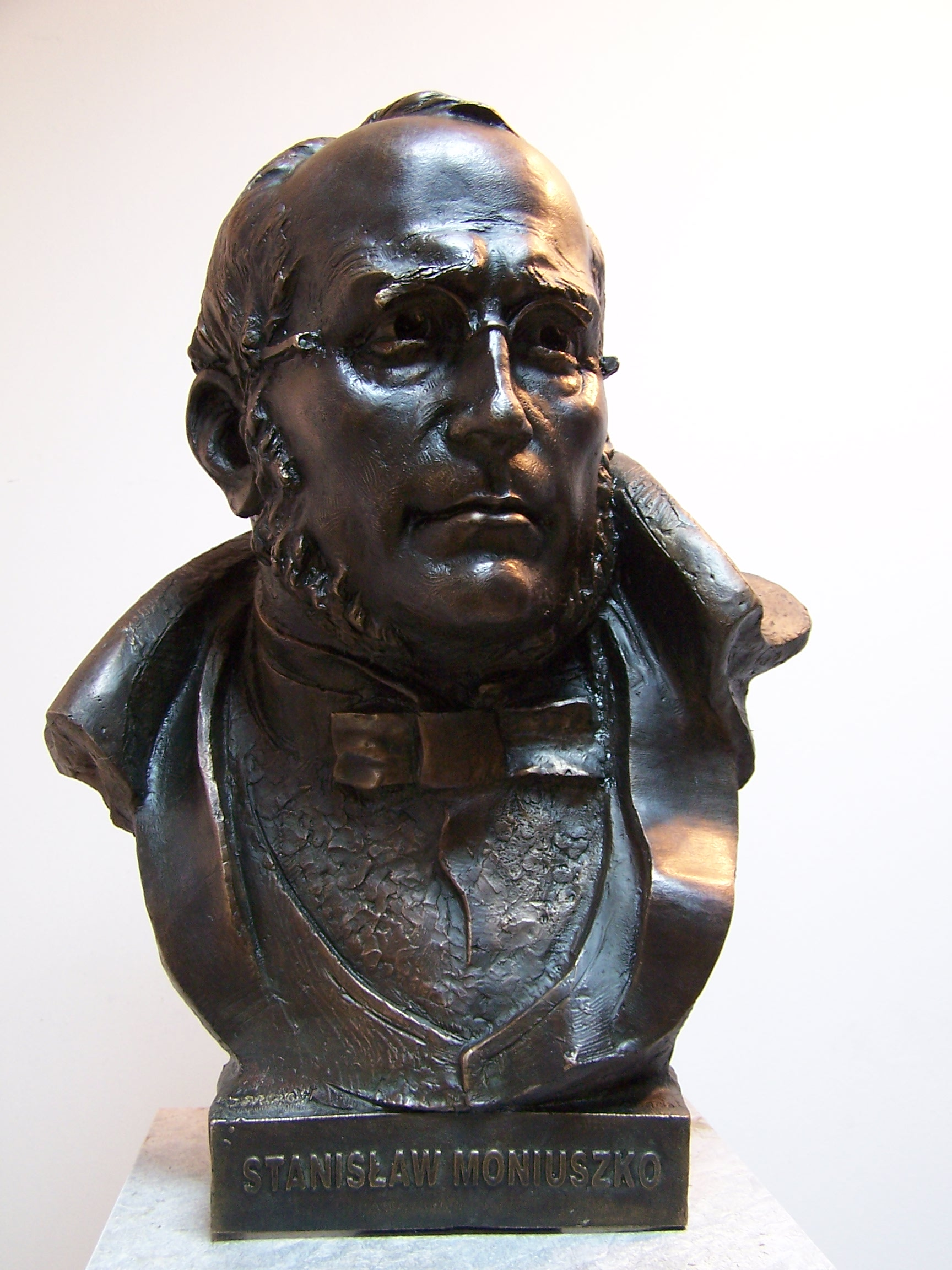
Bust of Stanisław Moniuszko in the Stanisław Moniuszko Academy of Music in Gdańsk

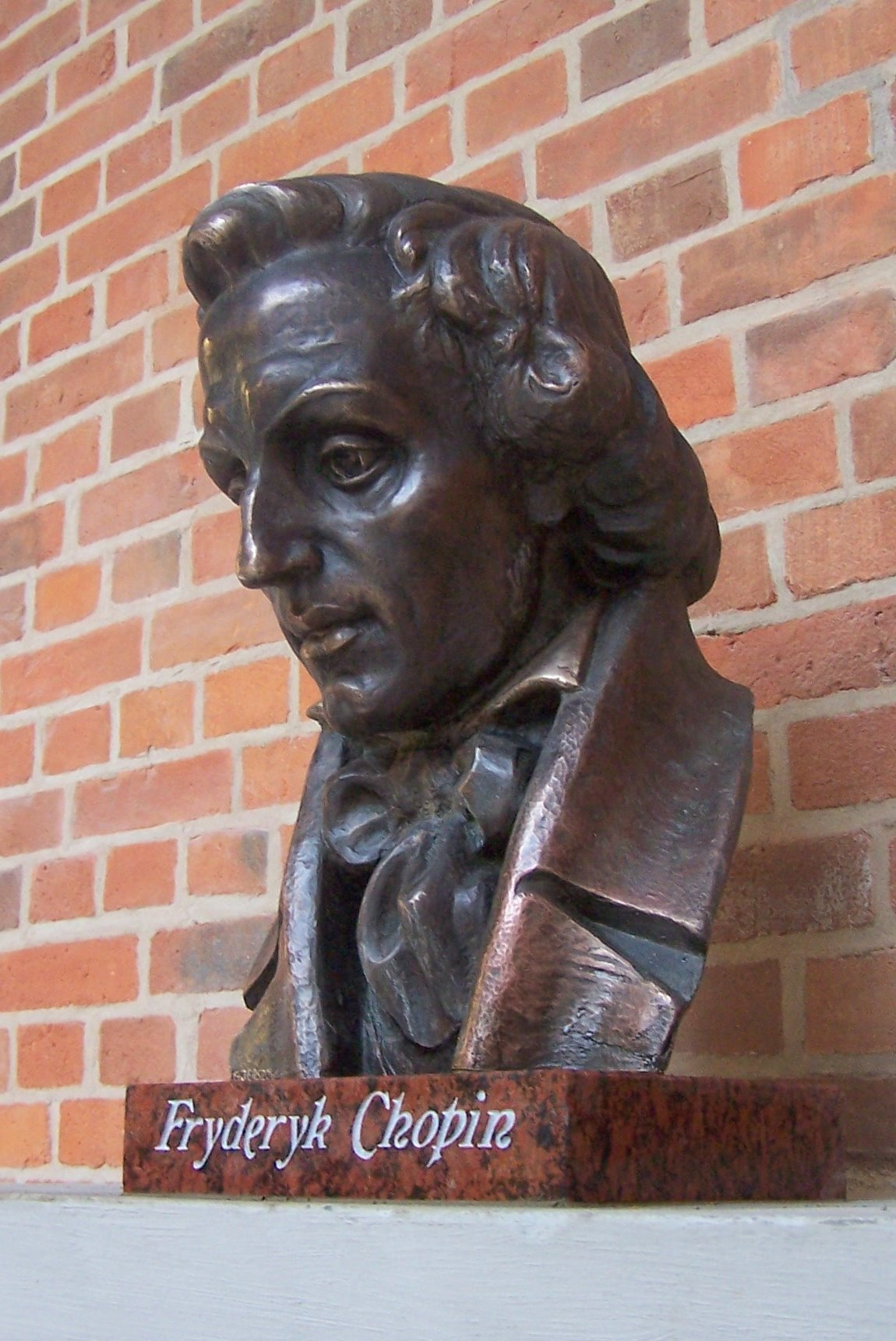
Bust of Fryderyk Chopin in the Polish Baltic Philharmonic in Gdańsk

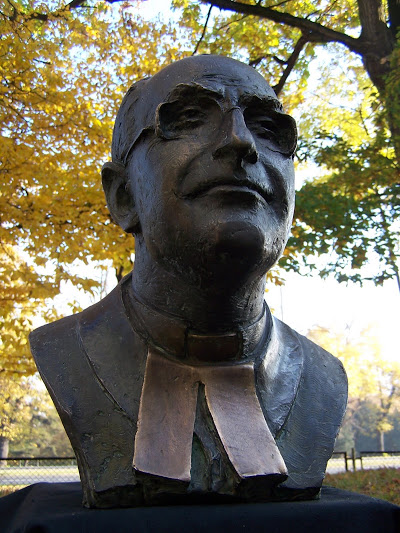
Roman Pawlas Tomaszów Mazowiecki

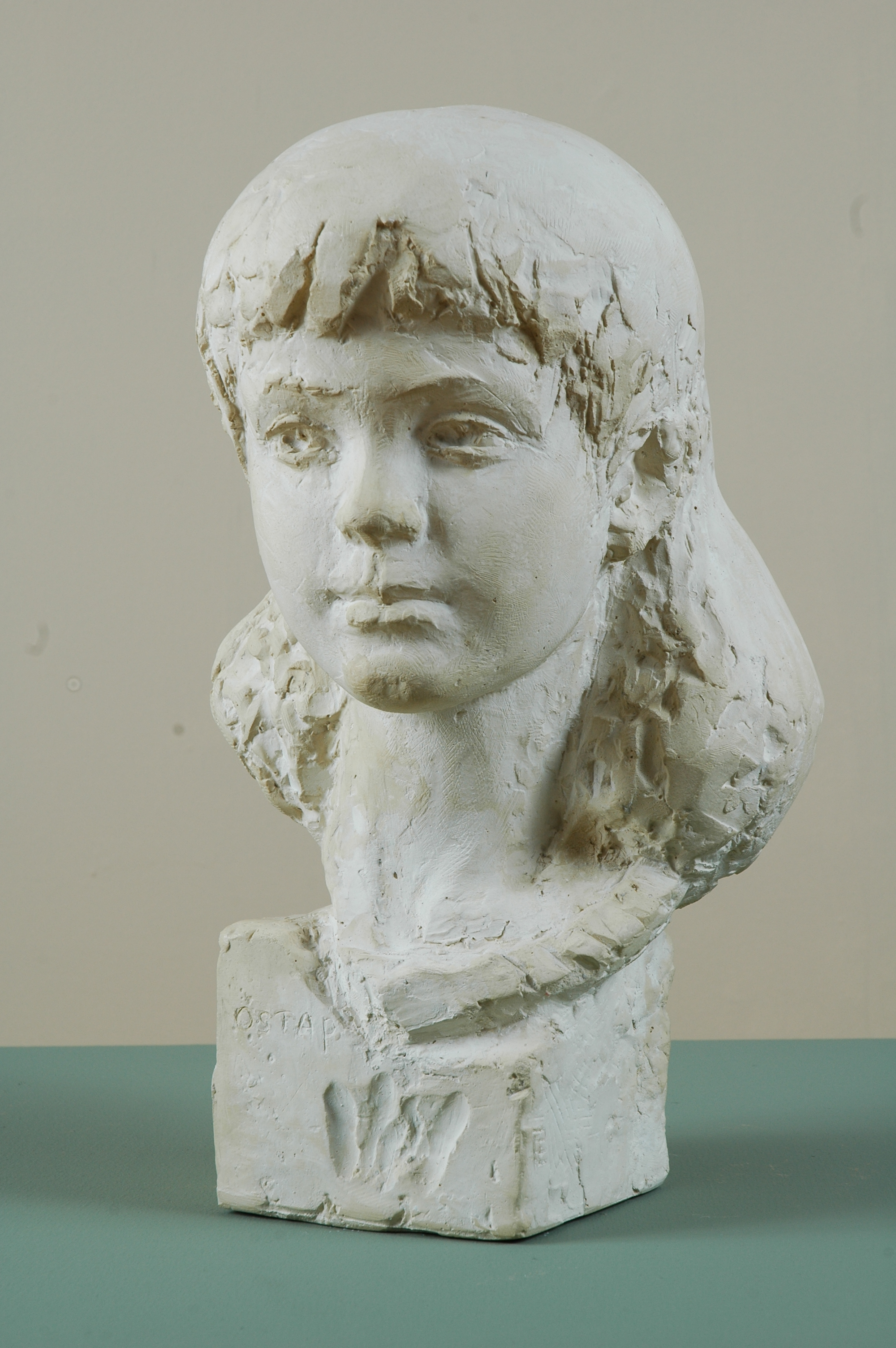
Eustafij Jerszow

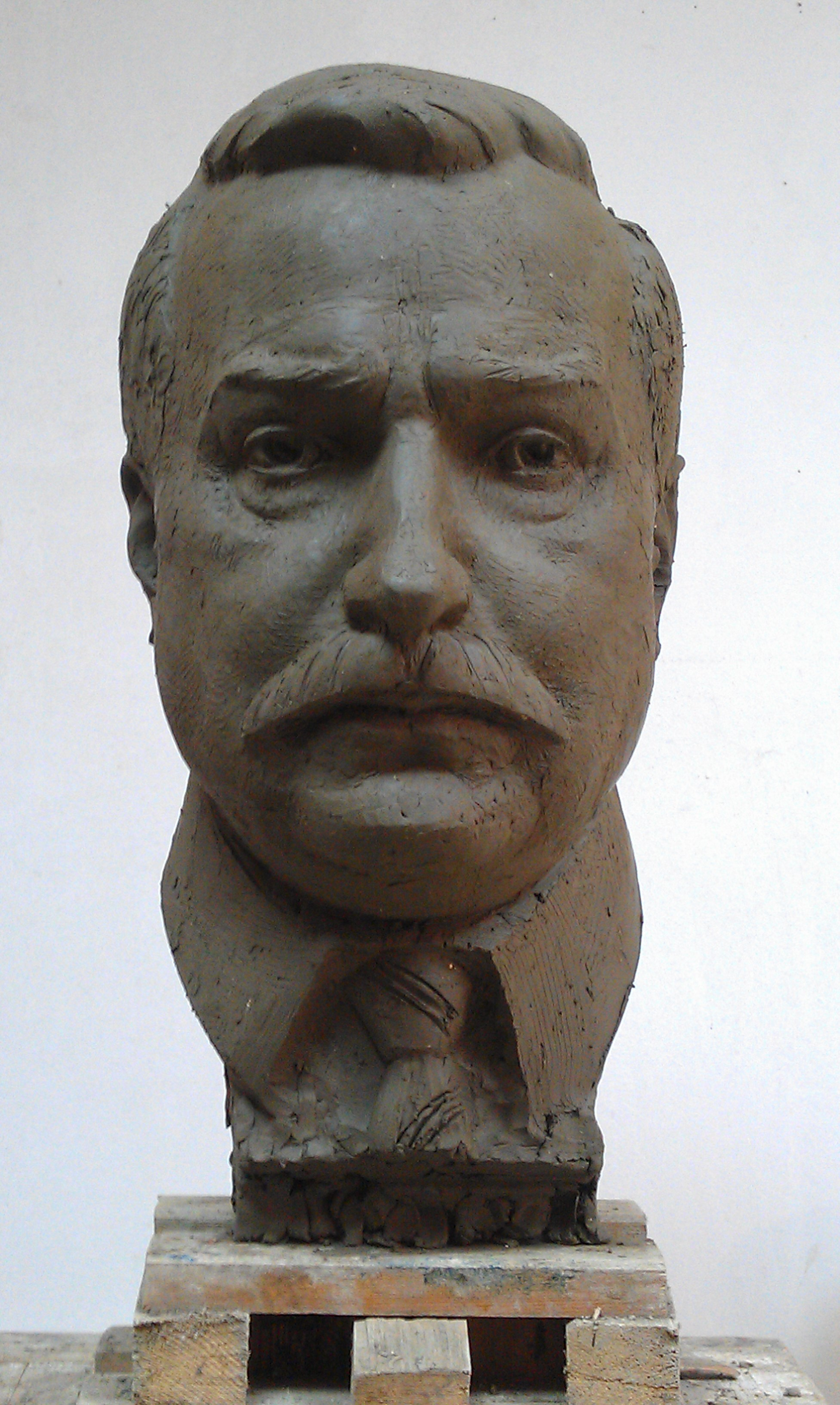
Prezydent Lech Wałęsa

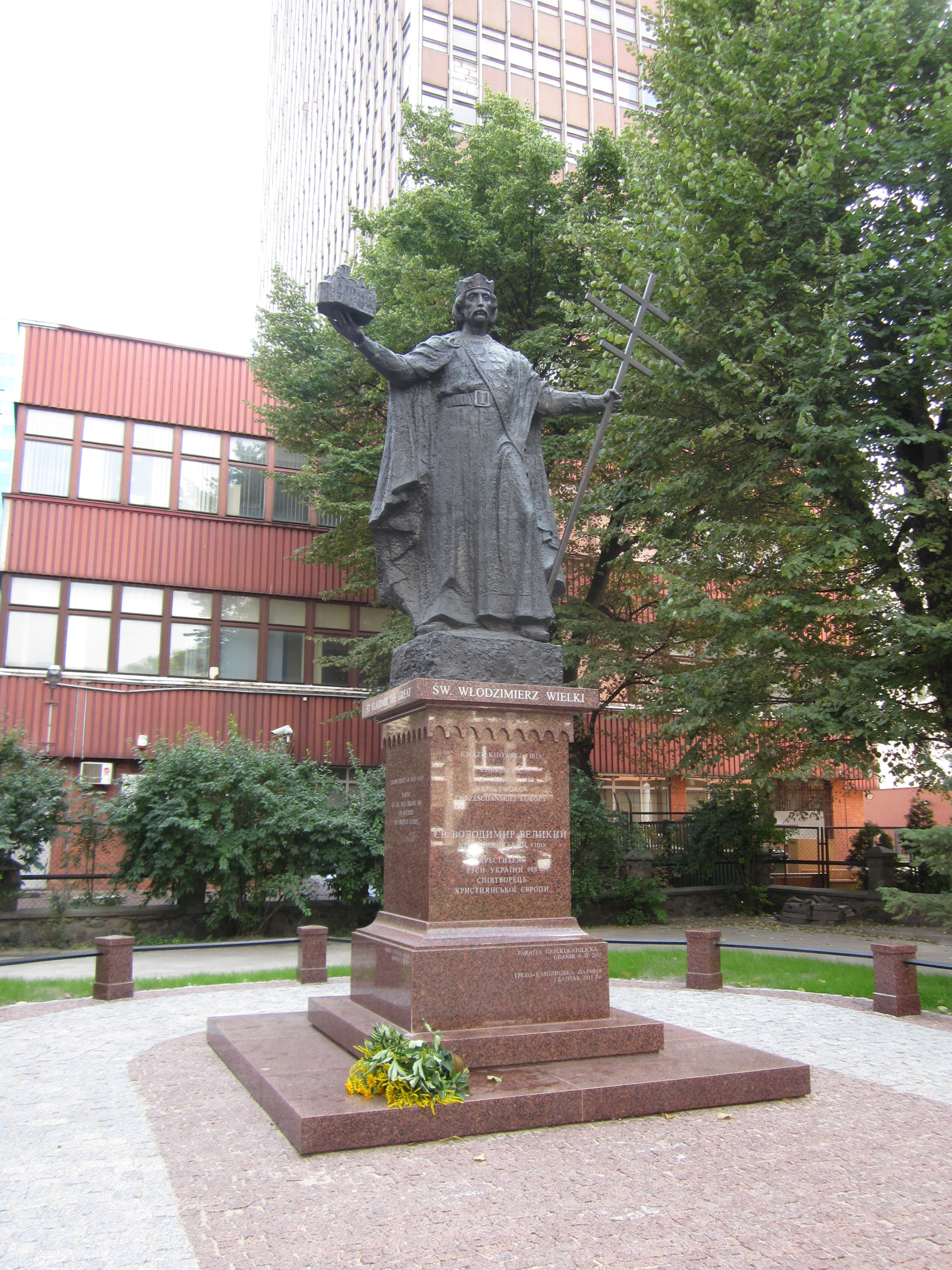
Monument to Vladimir the Great in Gdańsk, Poland. Celebrated on 23 May 2015, on the occasion of the millennium since the death of the baptist of Kievan Rus'. Built with the help of the Ukrainian community of Gdańsk and the Ukrainian diaspora of the world.

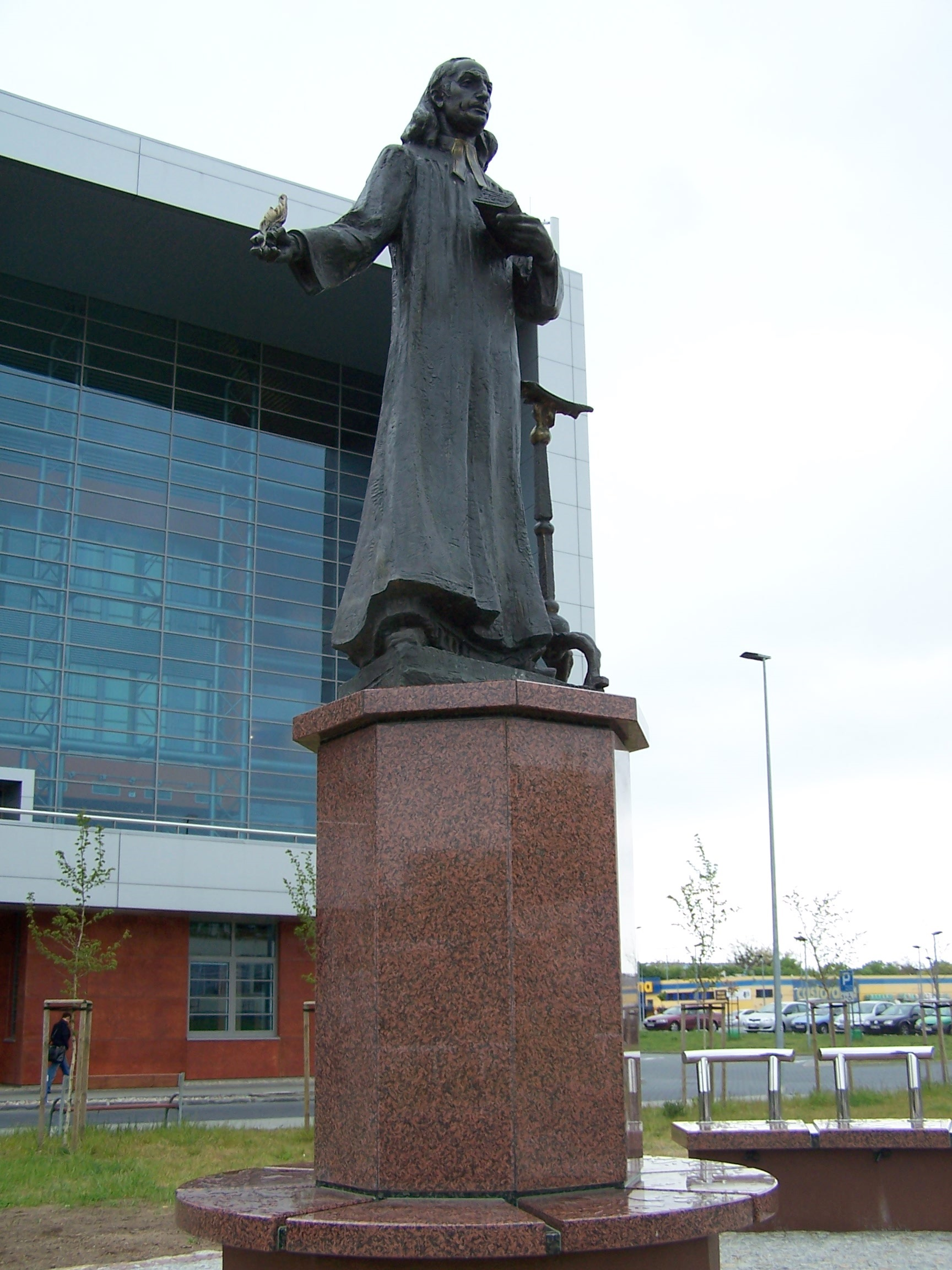
Monument to Christoph Coelestin Mrongovius in University of Gdańsk, Poland 2009

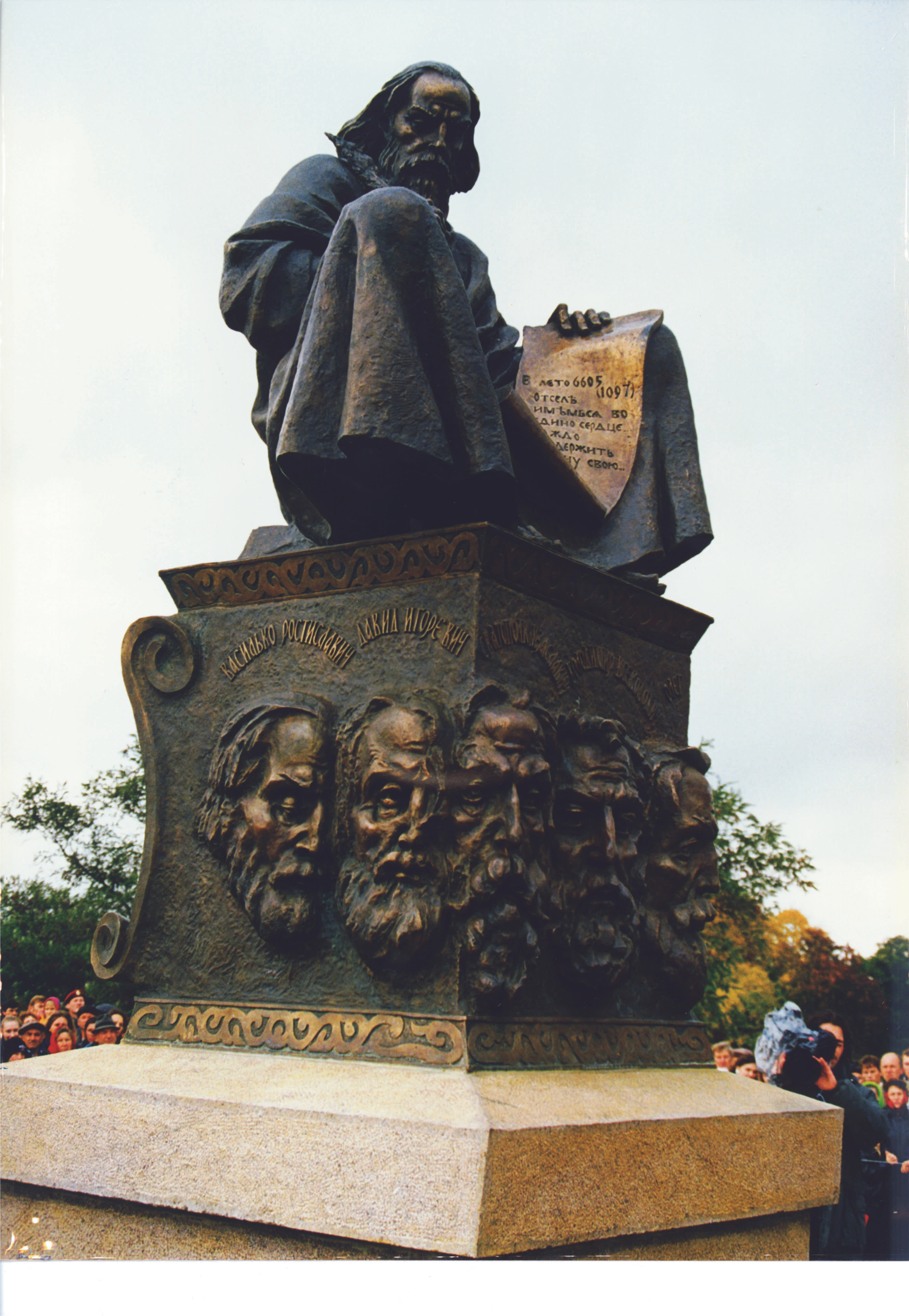
Monument. The Council of Liubech 1097. Liubech, Ukraine 1997

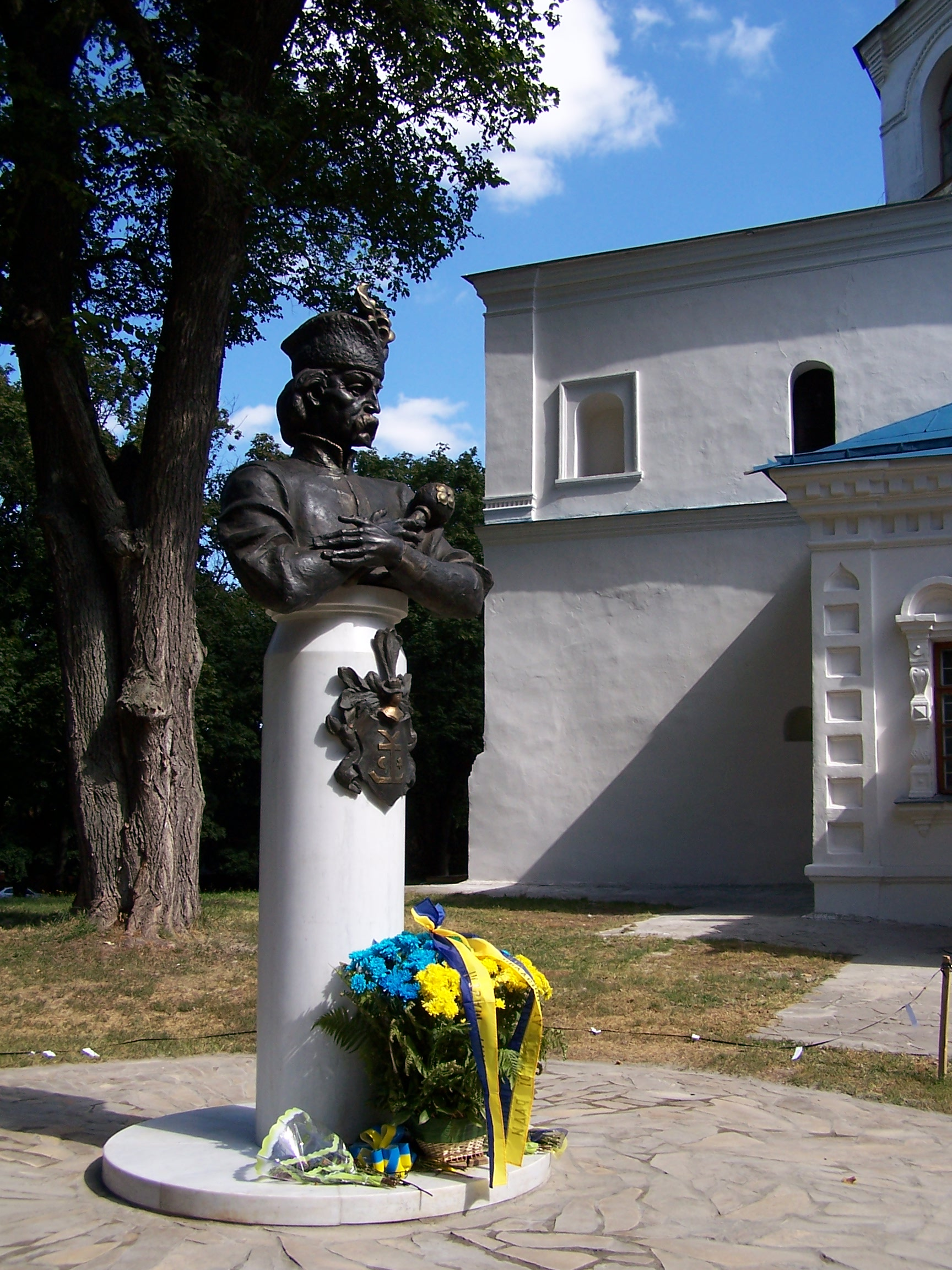
Monument to Ivan Mazepa, Chernihiv, Ukraine 2009

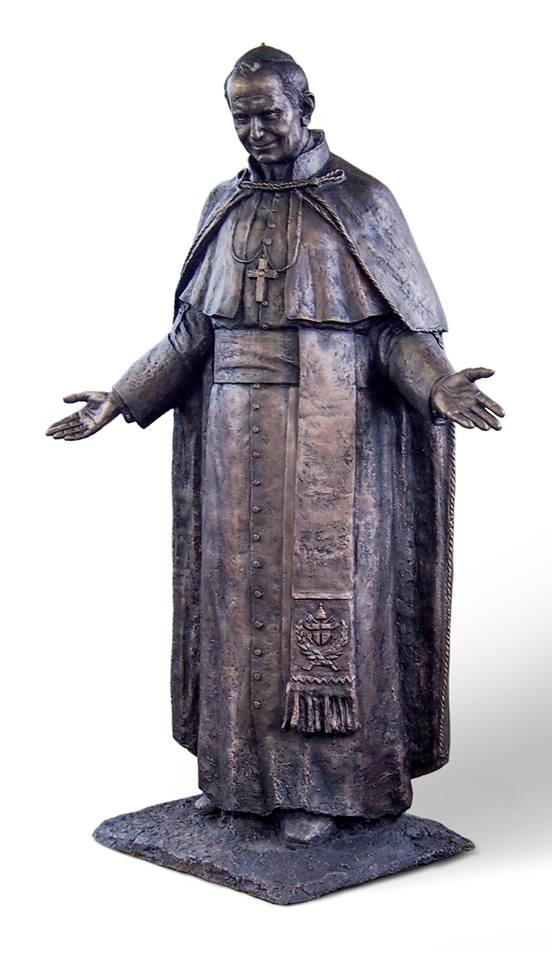
Monument to Jan Paweł II, Radio MARIA, Toruń, Poland 2014

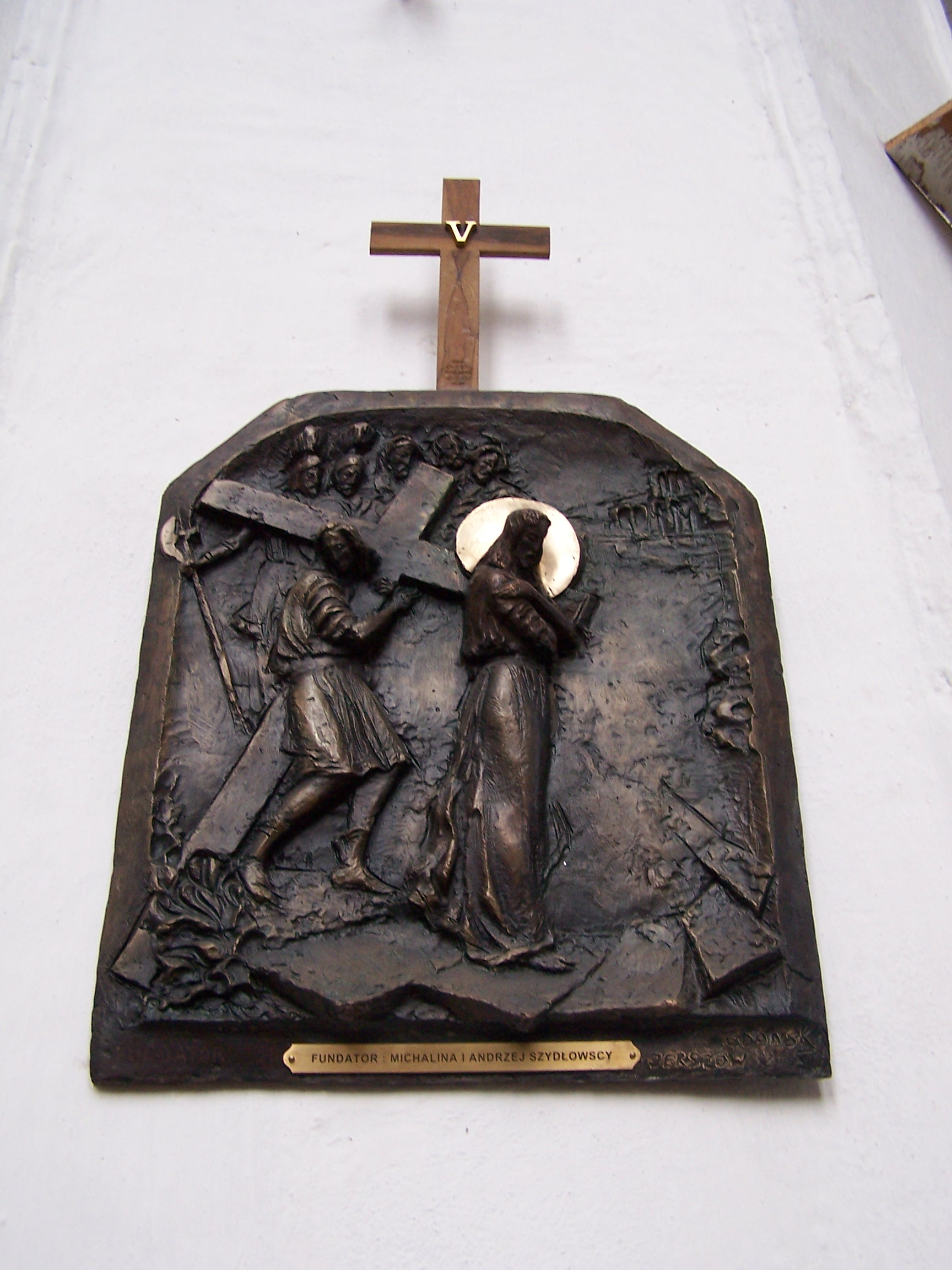
Stations of the Cross in St. Mary's Church in Gdańsk

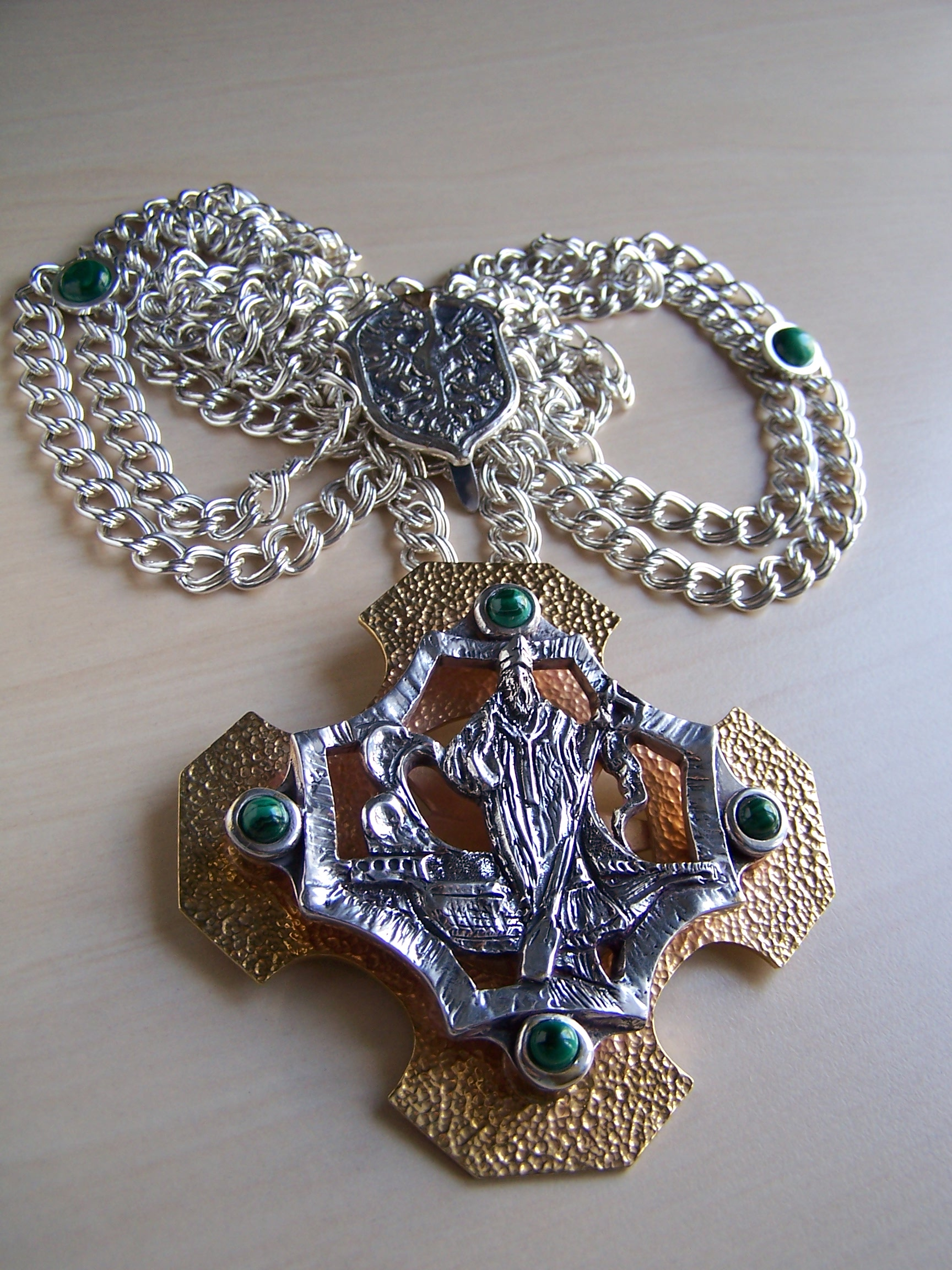
Cross of catholic canons. Collegiate Church. Roman Catholic Archdiocese of Gdańsk

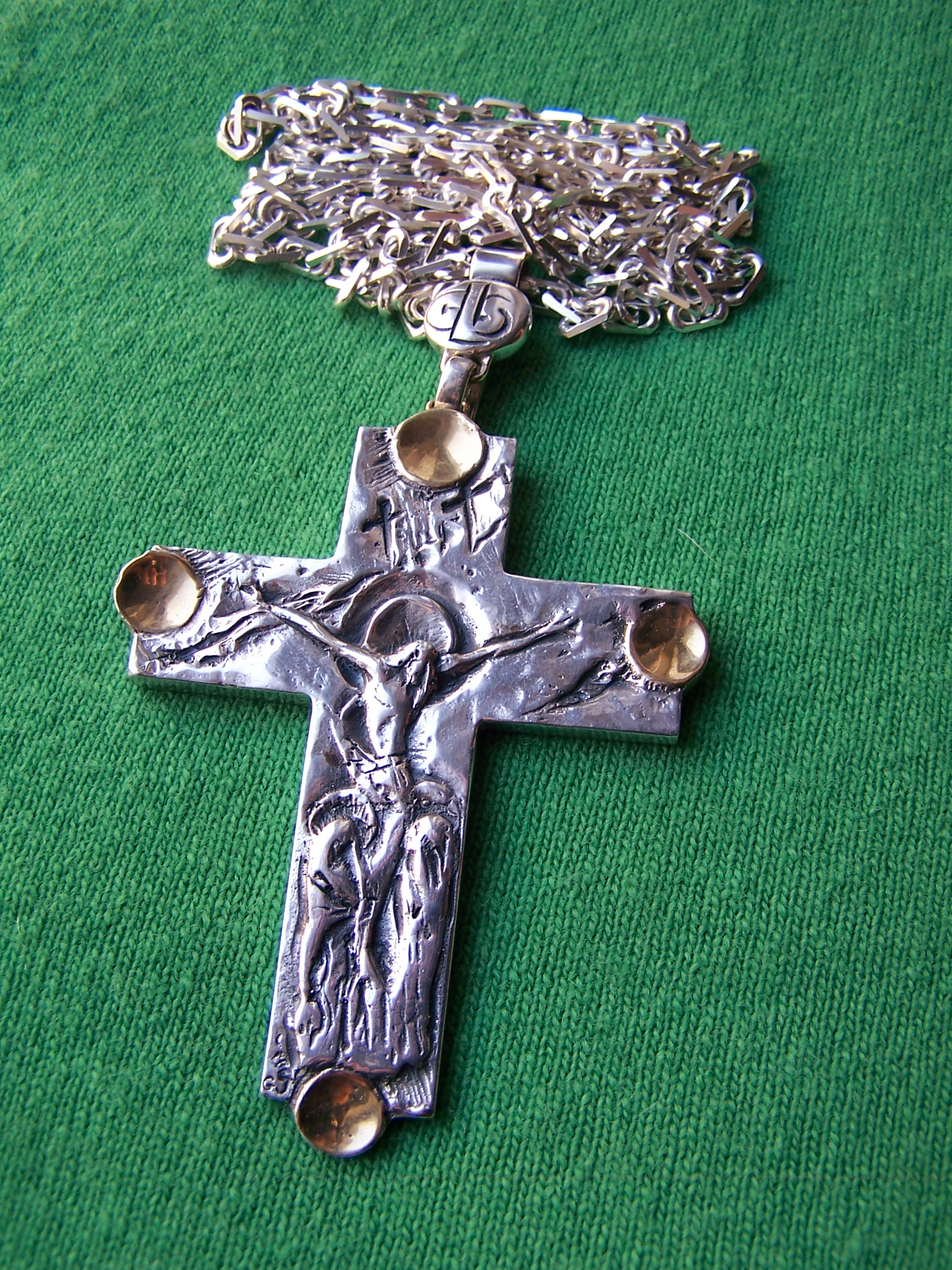
Archbishop's pectoral cross. Roman Catholic Archdiocese of Gdańsk

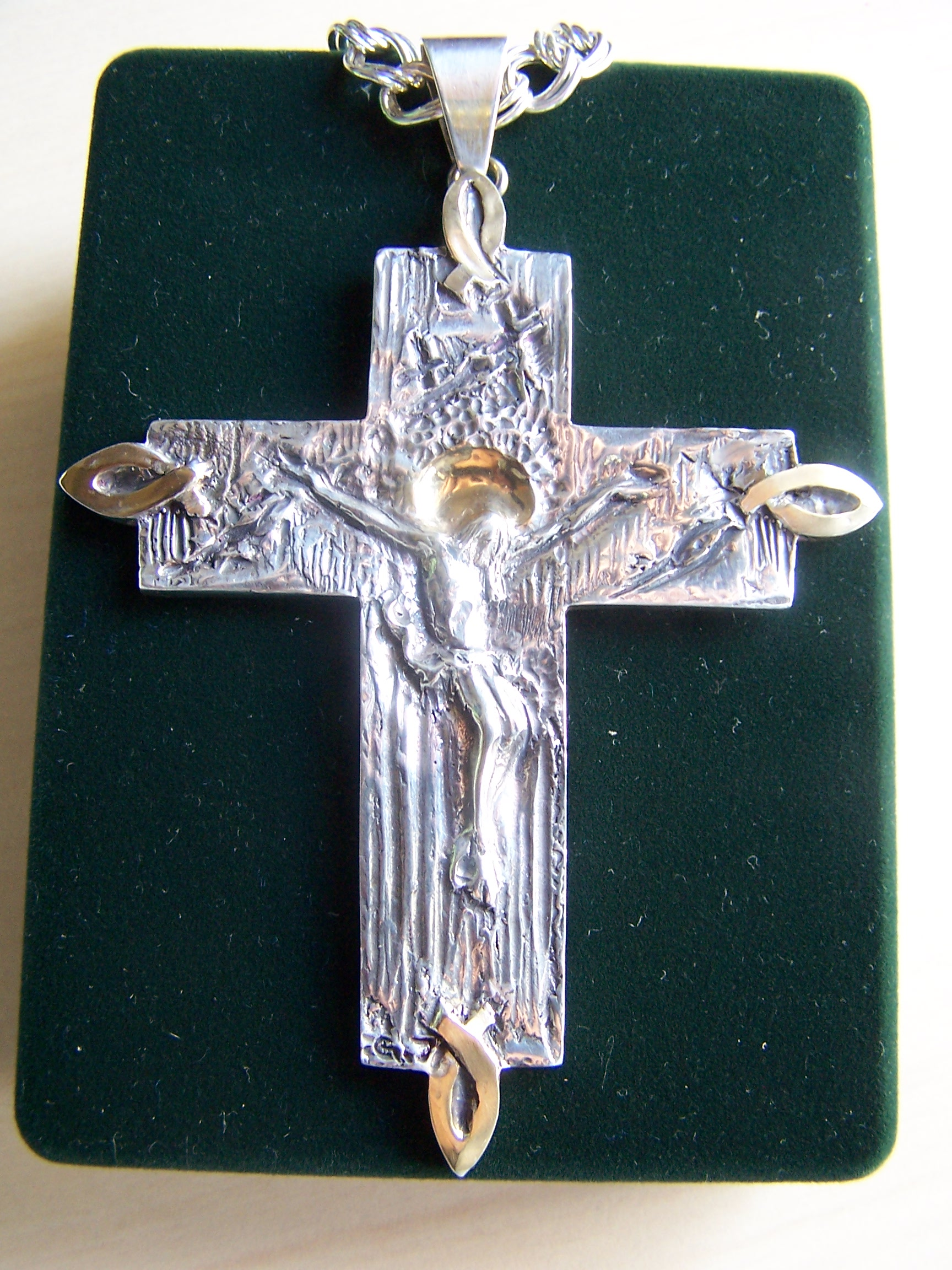
Archbishop's pectoral cross. Roman Catholic Archdiocese of Gdańsk

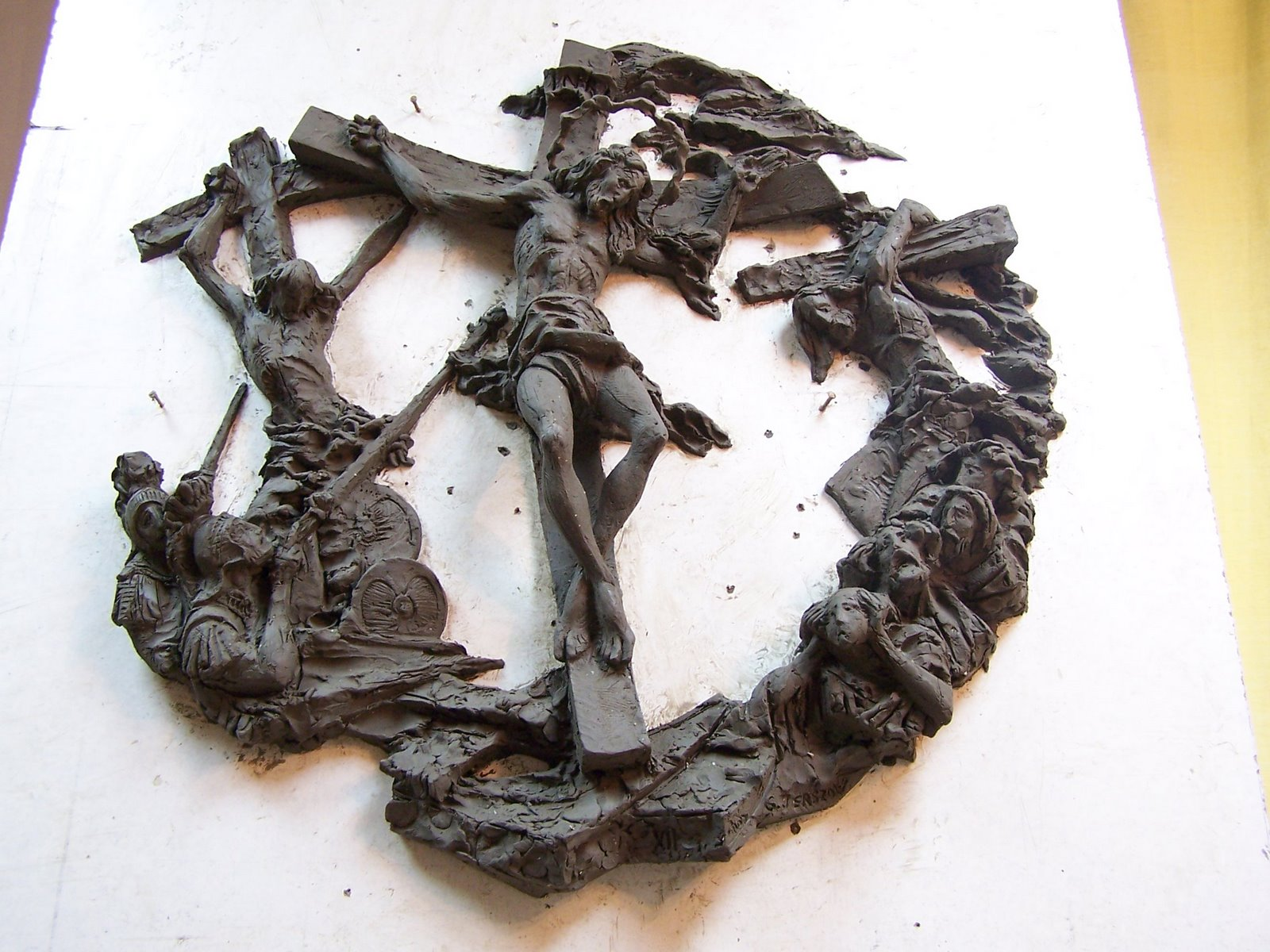
Stations of the Cross XII. Toruń, Poland, 2007

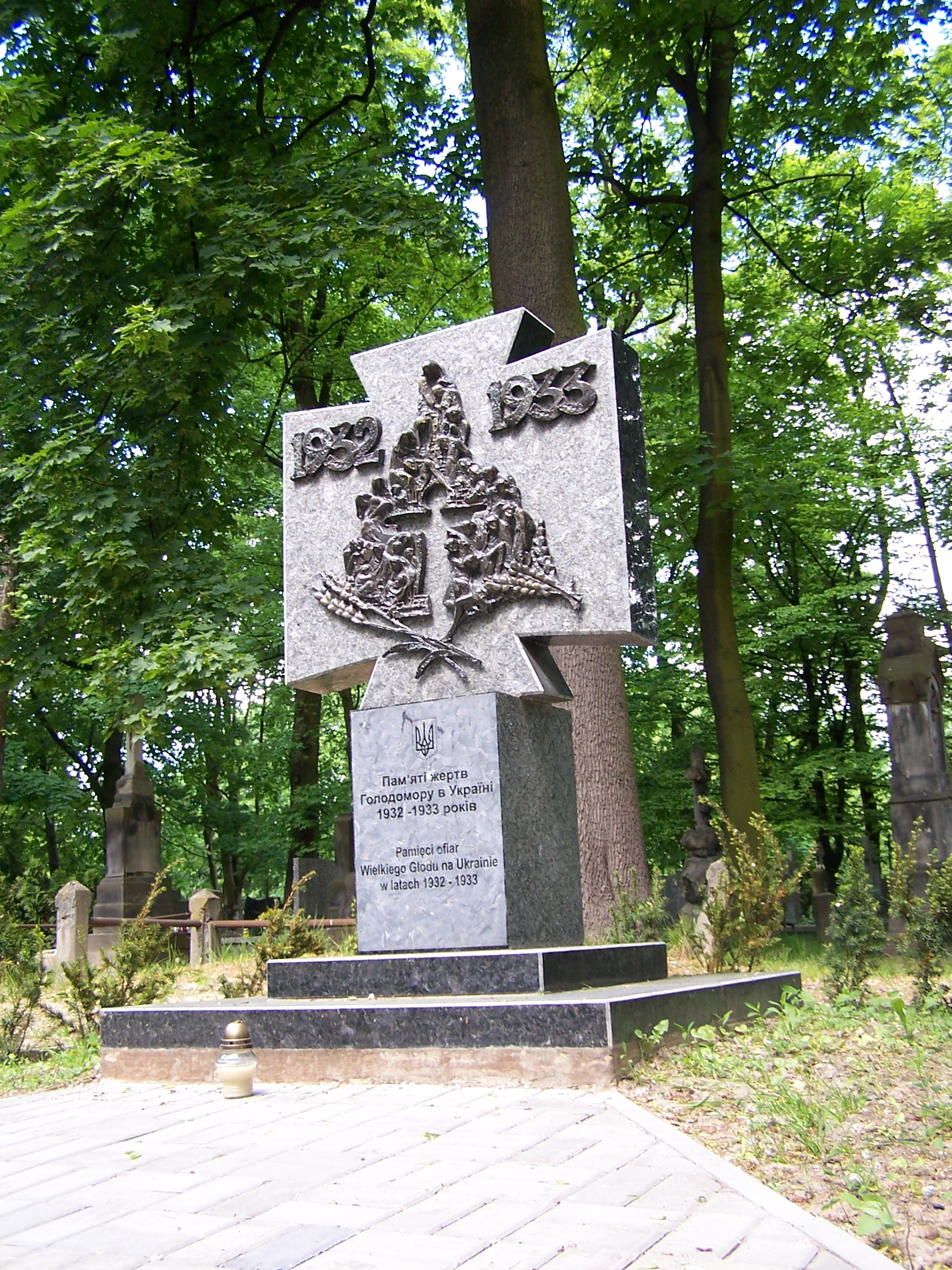
Monument to the victims of the Holodomor in Warsaw, Poland

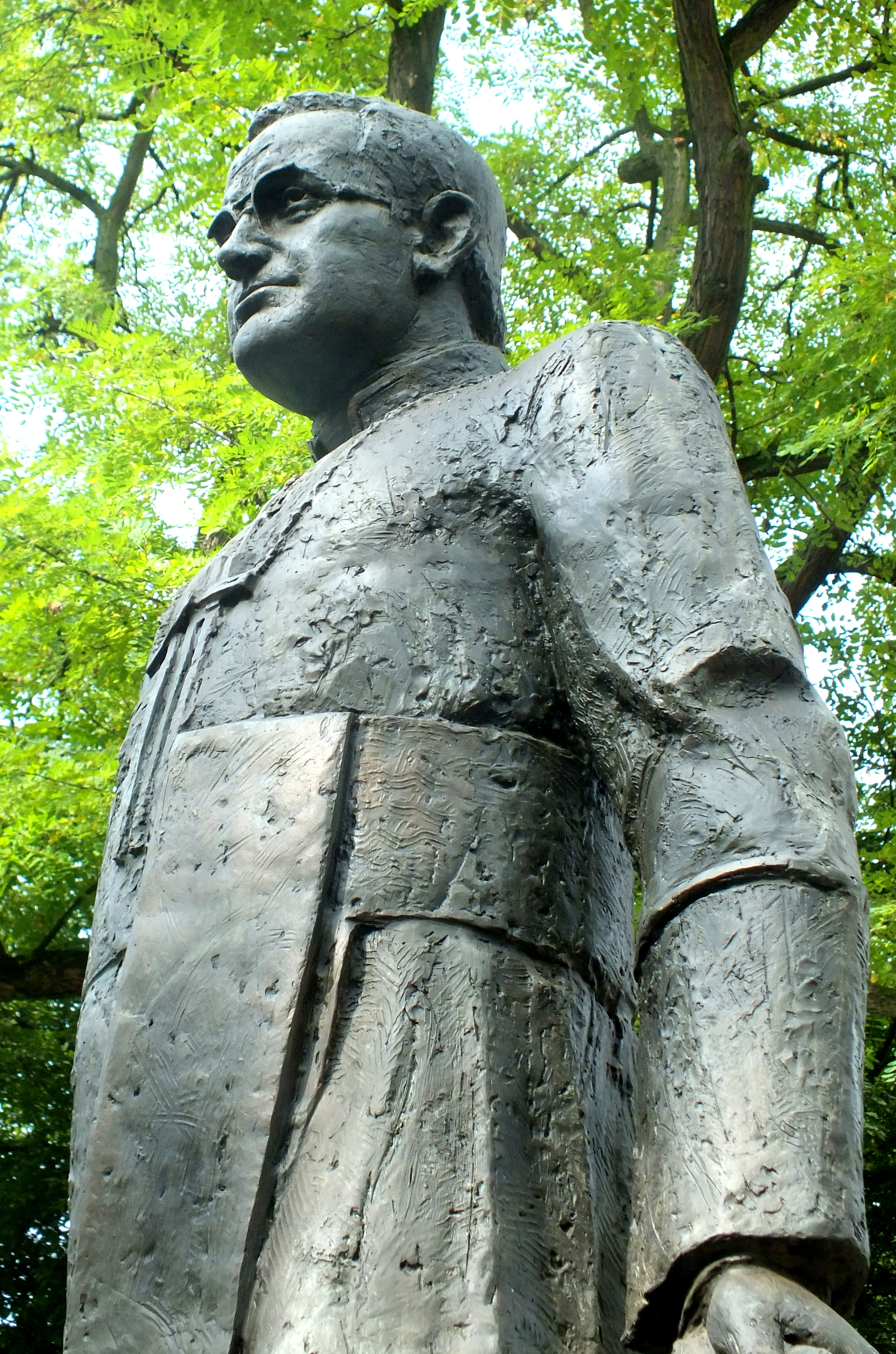
Monument to Henryk Jankowski in Gdańsk, Poland 2012

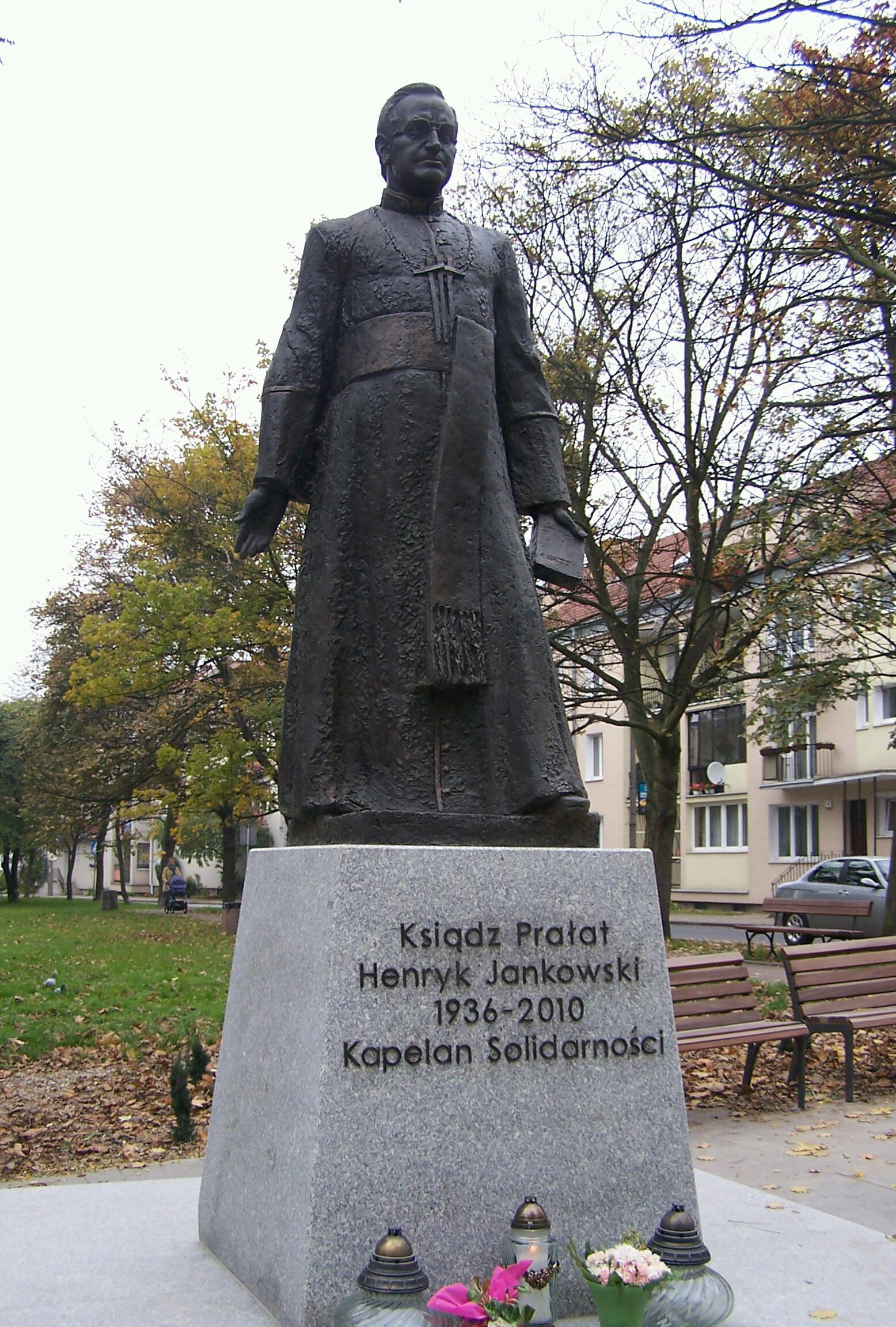
Monument to Henryk Jankowski in Gdańsk, Poland 2012

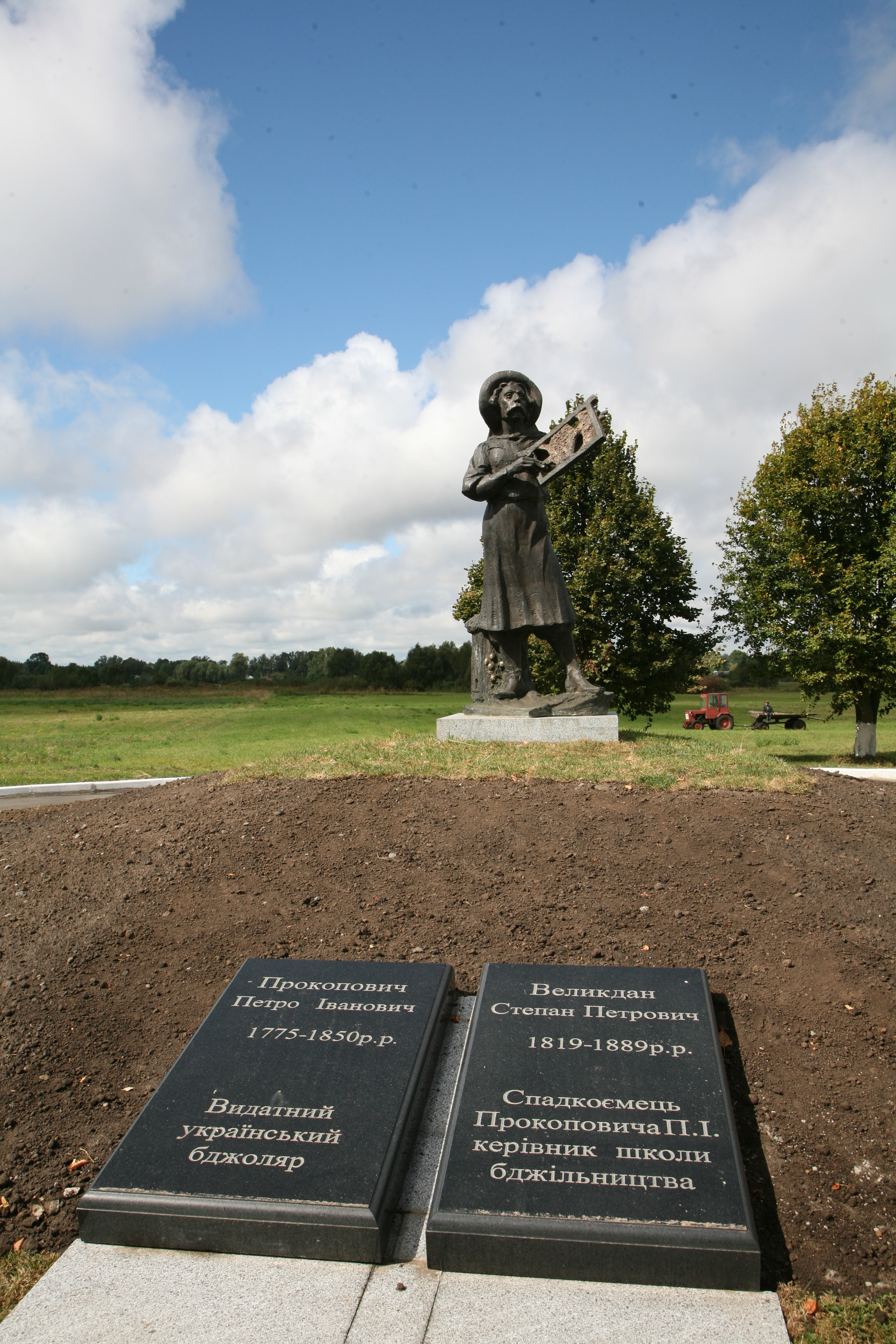
Monument to Petro Prokopovych in Baturyn

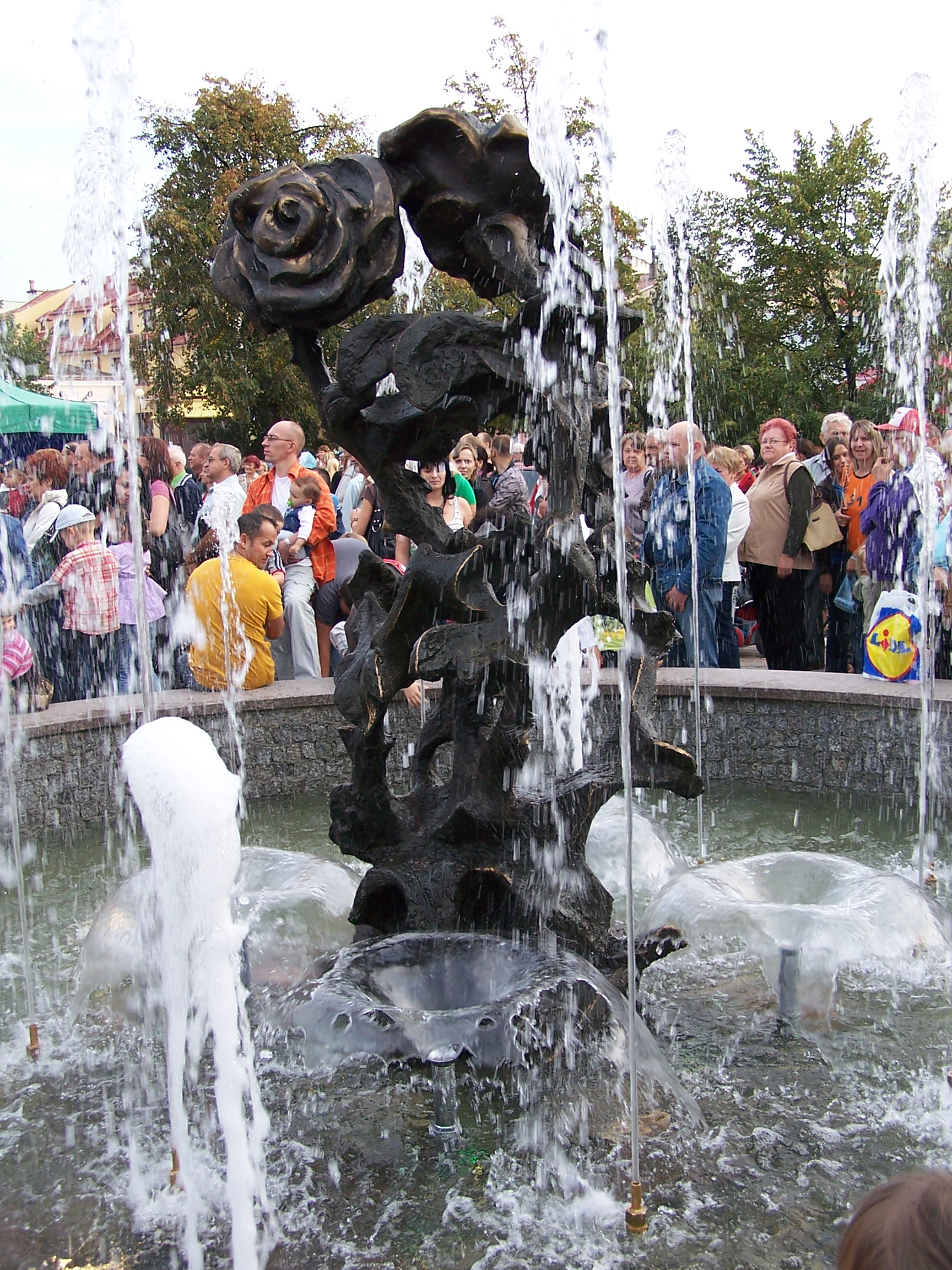
Fontanna Tarnobrzeg

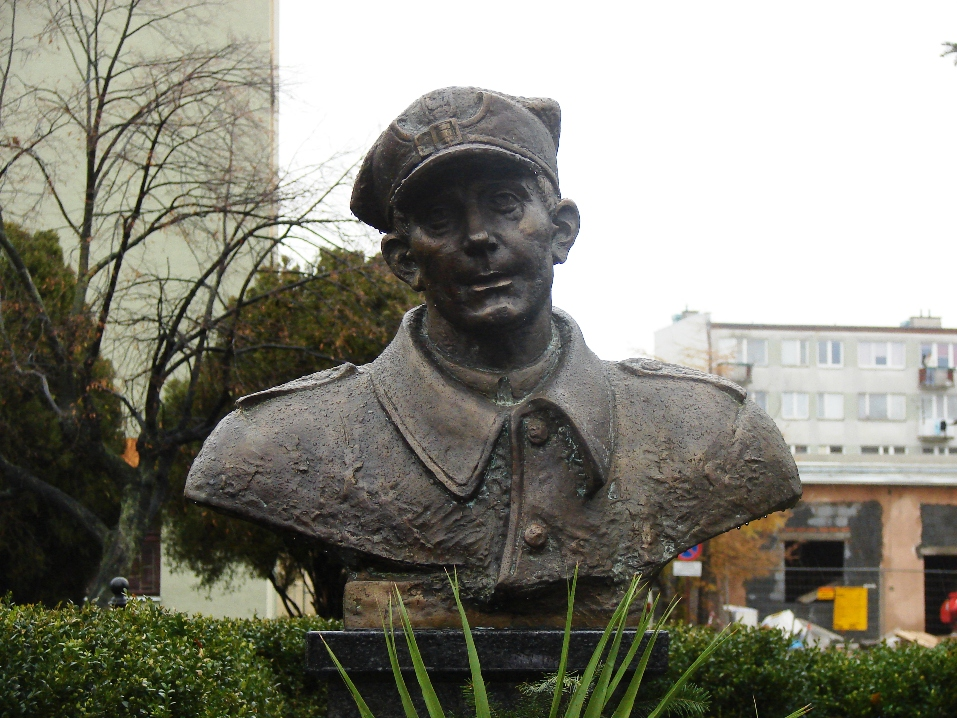
Monument to Hieronim Dekutowski in Tarnobrzeg

== Sources ==
- В. П. Коваленко. Єршов Геннадій Олексійович Encyclopedia of modern Ukraine (On Ukrainian)
- Єршов Геннадій Олексійович Сайт Національної спілки художників України National Union of Artists of Ukraine
- Ukrainian diaspora museum https://diaspora.com.ua/en/gennadiy-yershov-gennadij-jerszow-born-in-1967/ sculptor Gennadiy Yershov
- Ольга Собкович Українсько-польський скульптор – Геннадій Єршов // Образотворче мистецтво No. 4, — 2010, No. 1, — 2011 Fine Arts (magazine)(On Ukrainian)
- Marek Adamkowicz Gennadij Jerszow i jego rzeźby "rozsiane" po całym Pomorzu // Dziennik Bałtycki 9 lutego — 2014
