= Jealous Print Studio =

Print publisher and studio in London

Coordinates: 51°31′27″N 0°04′50″W

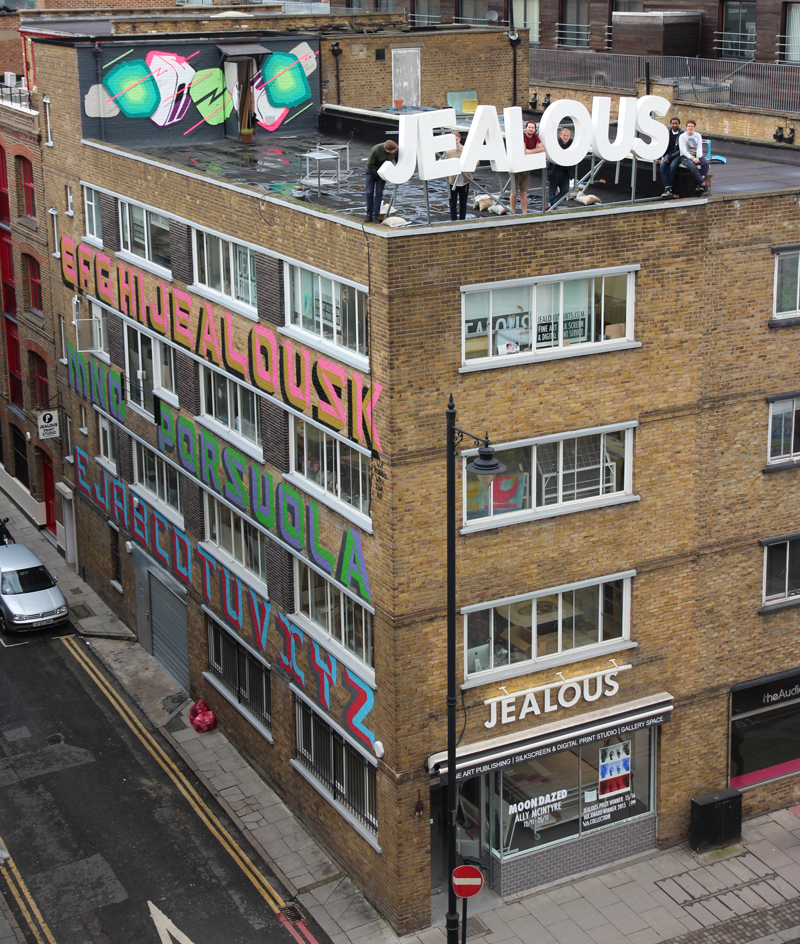
- Jealous Gallery and Print Studio, Shoreditch, East London
- Founded: 2008
- Founder: Dario Illari and Jacquie Ryle
- Country of origin: United Kingdom
- Headquarters location: Shoreditch, East London
- Publication types: Limited edition prints

Jealous Print Studio is a print publisher and studio based in Shoreditch, East London. The studio collaborates with established artists, galleries, designers and museums in producing limited edition prints. The studio's clients include White Cube, Fine Art Society, Victoria and Albert Museum, ICA, Tate, Saatchi Gallery, The British Film Institute, and the Royal Academy of Arts.

Providing facilities for the production of screenprinting, digital printing, and relief printing, the studio has been used by over 500 artists, including Gavin Turk, David Shrigley, Quentin Blake, Gary Hume, Ben Eine and Jake and Dinos Chapman.

Jealous Print Studio also has a gallery space, known as Jealous Gallery. Jealous supports its artist collaborators by promoting and selling their art work in the gallery and at international art fairs such as the Affordable Art Fair, London Art Fair, London Original Print Fair and London Original Print Fair.

== History ==
Jealous was founded in Crouch End, North London in 2008 by Dario Illari and Jacquie Ryle, who enlisted the help of screenprinter Matthew Rich. They were soon joined by printmaker and artist Adam Bridgland. The print studio began in a former carpet shop on Park Road, with printing beds occupying a small space in the back of the building, and a gallery space at the front. The gallery was soon named Jealous North, when in 2014, Jealous opened a second space in Shoreditch, East London, formally known as Jealous East. The print studio now contains over 3 floors of print studios, with each floor dedicated to a different stage of the printing process. The gallery space on the ground floor hosts group exhibitions and solo shows of the artists work published in the studio.

== Printing ==
The primary printmaking techniques used at Jealous Print Studio are screenprinting and digital printing, using water-based inks in their practice. The studio often experiments with mixed media, combining digital printing with hand-pulled screenprinted overlays. Materials such as carborundum, diamond dust and gold leaf are materials often used for overlays. Techniques such as flocking and blind embossing are also practiced.

The studio collaborates with artists for experimentational projects. In 2011 the studio screenprinted using mud for Norfolk artist Alison Mitchell, and screenprinted ink onto goat skins for Australian artist Caitlin Yardley. In 2017 bio-artist Sarah Craske collaborated with the studio in screenprinting live bacteria onto pages from a 300-year-old book. The same year saw Hokusai’s famous The Great Wave off Kanagawa screenprinted onto Pink Floyd drummer Nick Mason’s drumskins, that were later displayed in the Victoria and Albert Museum for Pink Floyd: Their Mortal Remains.

== Projects and collaborations ==
In November 2014 Jealous Print Studio and artist Anthony Burrill were invited to participate in a launch by the Crafts Council in the House of Commons. Multiple screenprint beds were set up to live print the cover of the Manifesto Our Future Is In The Making, aimed to emphasize the importance of craft-making in future education.

In May 2017 Jealous were invited to live print at the opening of the 57th Venice Biennale in the Diaspora Pavilion. A print edition made in the Jealous Print Studio was later released by emerging British artist Khadija Saye, whose work was featured at the Biennale. The event garnered media attention proceeding the event due to the artists involvement in the Grenfell Tower Fire disaster, and the prints were displayed in Tate Britain in commemoration of her life.

In 2010 Jealous collaborated with London design agency Graphic Thought Facility to produce the Extraordinary Heroes Exhibition at the Imperial War Museum. In 2013 they then collaborated to produce a screenprinted poster for the National Theatre to commemorate their 50th anniversary. Further notable artist collaborations in the studio include Kelley Walker, Chris Levine, Rose Wylie, Margaret Calvert, Quentin Blake, Frances Stark, Cary Kwok and Judy Blame.

=== The Jealous Prize ===
The Jealous Prize is an annual competition offered to MA graduates from major London Art Colleges to win an all-expenses paid artist residency in the Jealous Print Studio. Previous winners include Adam Dix who has also been recognised by the Future Map and Catlin Art Prize; Ann-Marie James who has since been awarded the Derek Hill Foundation Scholarship at The British School at Rome and is represented by Karsten Schubert Gallery; Charlie Billingham, whose work has been exhibited at the Royal Academy and Saatchi Gallery; and Erica Donovan, whose work includes a commission to transform The Artist's Pavilion at the 55th Venice Biennale. In 2014 Saatchi Gallery dedicated a month-long exhibition to the Jealous Prize in their Prints and Editions department. The winner's editions were accepted into the Victoria & Albert Museum permanent collection on a yearly basis until the project was paused in 2022.

=== Jealous Needs You ===
Established in 2011, Jealous Needs You is a project from Jealous Print Studio that invites artists, graphic designers and illustrators of all levels of experience and backgrounds to submit artworks to make up a portfolio of screenprint editions. The chosen designs are then produced as 2 or 3 colour screenprints and a limited edition of 36, giving all artists the same constraints to work within. Previous year's portfolios have included submissions from artists such as Rob Ryan, Marion Deuchars, Magnus Gjoen and Rose Blake. Each portfolio of prints are then displayed in an annual exhibition at Saatchi Gallery. Jealous Needs You is currently on hold.

== Charity projects ==
In 2014, Jealous and artist Charming Baker were approached by the Foreign and Commonwealth Office (FCO) in association with War Child UK. They were asked to create a visual focal point and accompanying limited edition print in preparation for the Global Summit to End Sexual Violence in Conflict, co-chaired by Angelina Jolie and Foreign Secretary William Hague. The screenprint editions were produced in the Jealous Studio, and released at the opening of the Global Summit at the Excel on 10 June.

The studio have produced print editions for numerous charities, including portfolios such as Ghost of Gone Birds for Birdlife International Trust and Art on a Postcard for The Hepatitis C Trust, featuring artists such as Anita Klein, Rachel Howard, John Wragg and Mick Rooney RA. In 2016, Jealous produced print editions by artists Ben Eine and Charming Baker to raise funds for charities in aid of homelessness. The print entitled ‘Home Sweet Homeless’ by Ben Eine was created in support of the charity Shelter. The project gained notable media attention due to its production and launch in the gallery featuring on Sky Arts ‘The Art Show’ in June 2017.

In April 2016, Jealous and Ben Eine collaborated with leading street vendor magazine The Big Issue to celebrate 200 million sales. The three magazine covers, reading ‘Celebrate’, in Ben Eine's recognisable typography, were later produced as screenprinted editions and sold in aid of The Big Issue.

== Street art ==
Jealous collaborates with worldwide Street artists, producing original print editions for well known street artists such as Ben Eine, Niels Shoe Meulman, Jon Burgerman, Inkie and Otto Schade. The Rooftop Mural project atop the Jealous East building invites street artists to create murals on the wall overlooking East London. Previous artists to be involved include David Shillinglaw, Static, Mau Mau, Carl Cashman, Ben Slow and James Earley.
