= ALO (artist) =

Italian artist

ALO (born Aristide Loria) is an Italian fine artist based in London. He started his career in the British capital, where he began exhibiting with art galleries and painting outdoor murals. ALO has also worked in Paris, New York, and Berlin. He held his first major solo exhibition, "Hail to the loser", at Saatchi Gallery in 2014, beginning an ongoing collaboration with the gallery. His second solo exhibition at the Saatchi Gallery was "Exit from Aden" in 2017, followed by "Liminal", which took place from November 2021 to February 2022.

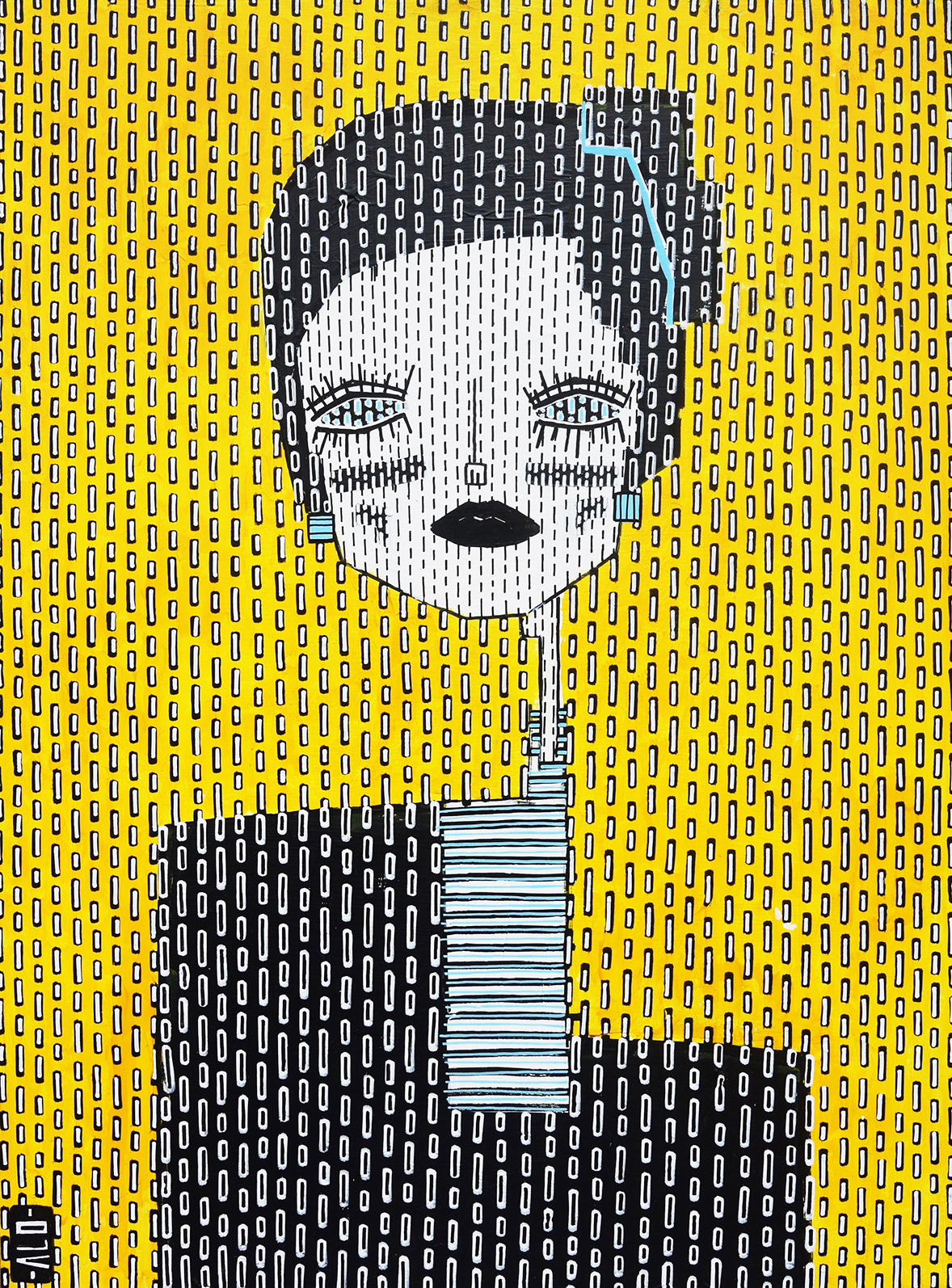
Nina by Alo

== Art exhibitions ==
2025 – Bardo, solo show BSMT, London

2025 - "On Repeat", group show at Saatchi Gallery with Jealous Gallery Jealous Print Studio, London

2024 – Love, Art Project at Fortnum & Mason, London

2024 – SOTTO/SOPRA, Group Show at Museum Santa Maria della Scala, Siena, Siena

2023 – Babel, solo show at Jealous Gallery Jealous Print Studio, London

2022 – Eleven, solo show BSMT, London

2021 – Liminal, solo show Saatchi Gallery, London

2020 – Grace, solo show BSMT, London

2018 – Ave, solo show Le Cabinet D'Amateur, Paris

2017 – Exit from Aden - The Unshown Works, solo show Saatchi Gallery, London

2017 – Made in London, group show Le Cabinet D'Amateur, Paris

2017 – Exit from Aden, solo show Saatchi Gallery, London

2015 – Pop the Streets, Saatchi Gallery, London

2014 – Hail to the loser, Saatchi Gallery, London

2014 – Project M/6, Urban Nation, Berlin

2014 – Collicola On the Wall, Palazzo Collicola, Spoleto (Italy)

2013 – Spectrum, Stolen Space Gallery, London

2013 – Winter group show, Stolen Space Gallery, London

== Press ==
Inspiring City, ALO Returns to BSMT Space with BARDO

Art Rabbit, On Repeat

FORTNUM & MASON UNVEILS WINDOW COLLABORATION WITH SIX STREET ARTISTS

“Sotto/sopra“. La storia della street art in mostra al museo

SOTTO/SOPRA Arte Urbana: dalla strada al museo, andata e ritorno

Inspiring City, Eleven the Exhibition by ALO at BSMT Space

UP Magazine, ALO's Liminal Show at Saatchi Gallery

Inspiring City, ALO Liminal exhibition at the Saatchi Gallery

Inspiring City, Alo the Artist with his own brand of Urban Expressionism

Widewalls, 'Grace', a solo show by ALO

La Repubblica.it, ALO

RNext, A Londra per dipingere su tela e su strada. Con Alo la street art fa il giro del mondo

RNext, Repubblica.it - "NEXT" - Perugia Teatro Pavone Italy

Artribune, Dalle strade a Saatchi. Per Alo “è accaduto tutto molto in fretta

== Auctions ==
Urban Art Auction, Artcurial, Paris

Urban Art, Tajan, Paris
