= Iñaki Gurruchaga =

Chile international rugby union player

- Born: 31 October 1995 (age 31) Concepción, Chile
- Height: 185 cm (6 ft 1 in)
- Weight: 130 kg (287 lb; 20 st 7 lb)

Rugby union career
- Position: Prop
Senior career
Years	Team	Apps	(Points)
2021–25	Selknam	42	
2025–	RC Vannes		
International career
Years	Team	Apps	(Points)
2014	Chile U20		
2015–Present	Chile	30	(0)

Iñaki Gurruchaga (born 31 October 1995) is a Chilean rugby union player. He plays Prop for Chile at an international level, and for RC Vannes in the Pro D2 competition. He competed in the 2023 Rugby World Cup.

== Career ==
Gurruchaga started playing rugby at his school, Saint John's in Concepción, he then joined Old John's Rugby club.

He played for Chile's under-20 team in 2014, before making his international debut for Chile's senior national side the following year.

In 2020, he was part of Selknam's team in their canceled inaugural season of the Super Rugby Americas, he remained with the team until 2025.

He was selected in Chile's squad for the 2023 Rugby World Cup in France.

In 2025, he signed with French club RC Vannes in the Pro D2 competition.
