= Philippe Daudy =

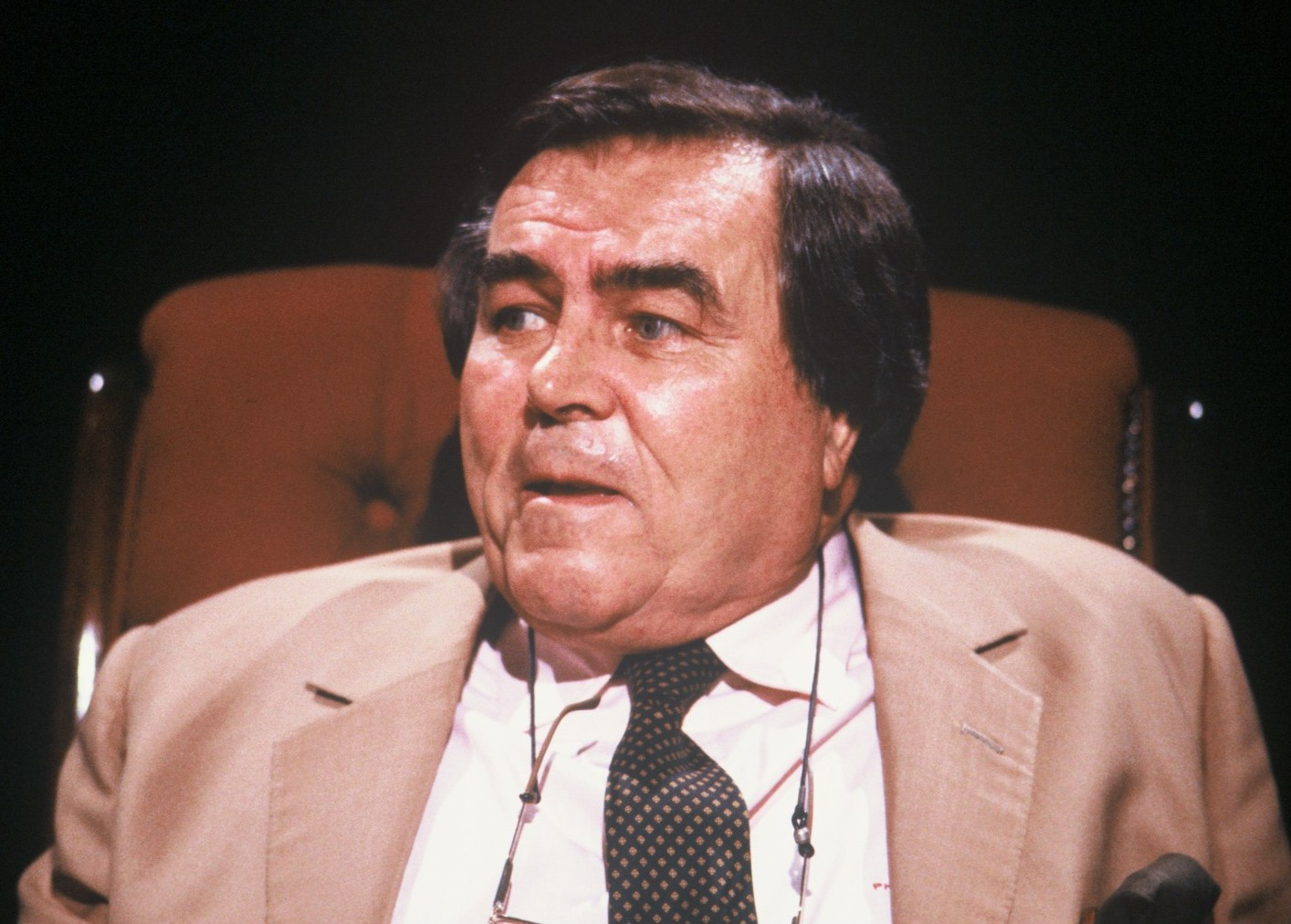
Appearing on television programme After Dark in 1987

Philippe Daudy (17 June 1925 – 12 March 1994) was a member of the French Resistance, a journalist, a novelist, a publisher and a businessman. An Anglophile Frenchman, he moved to England and wrote a book about the English.

== Origins ==
Daudy was born on 17 June 1925 and spent his childhood in Ethiopia, where his father, Bernard Daudy, was the medical officer for the French-run Imperial Railway Company of Ethiopia, but died young from a snake bite. Daudy's mother, a great beauty, later married Hubert Jules Deschamps, the historian and sociologist who governed French Somalia, Côte d'Ivoire and Senegal and ended his career in 1960 as Governor-General of the Colonies, at the peak of French colonial administration.

== Service in the Resistance ==
During the Second World War, Daudy served in a Resistance network operating in and around Lyons. He was wounded in an attack on a Gestapo transport depot at Villeurbanne and was awarded the Croix de Guerre. Interviewed in Marcel Ophüls's 1969 documentary on occupied France, The Sorrow and the Pity, Daudy was later to say:

At its best the Resistance was the first classless society in France. The two classes became comrades in arms, sharing the same dangers, and even death.

== Writer ==
After the Second World War, Daudy worked as a correspondent for Agence France-Presse, covering the Greek Civil War, the Korean War, the Far East and Josip Broz Tito’s Yugoslavia. Daudy co-authored a leading work on the Korean War and later contributed to Thames Television’s leading television documentary history, Korea: the Unknown War.

Daudy continued to write and to publish prolifically. His works included:

- Le Roi de Prusse (1960), a novel
- Neige a Capri (first published in 1960, under the pseudonym of Paul Paoli)
- Les Pigeons de Naples (1961, under the pseudonym of Paul Paoli)
- Bal a Bale (1962, under the pseudonym of Paul Paoli)
- L’Amour cousu d’or (1963), a novel
- a preface to Eugène Fromentin’s Dominique (1965)
- a preface to an edition of Prosper Mérimée (1964)
- a preface to Hamilton’s Memoires du comte de Gramont- (1965)
- Les Amants d’Italie (1966)
- Le Vagabond de Malevie (1977, under the pseudonym of Adrien Barraud)
- Le Criminel precautionneux (1978, under the pseudonym of Adrien Barraud)
- La Force du Destin (1981)
- Naples
- Histoire generale de la peinture: Le XVIIe siecle

== Les Anglais ==
In 1989, Daudy wrote Les Anglais, an affectionate analysis of the English national character, which was later translated into English by his daughter Isabelle Daudy and published in 1991. Unlike the French commentariat, however, the response from British critics to the book was lukewarm, with several reviews noting Daudy's fondness for cliché and his indifference to the experiences of ordinary people. One lacerating rebuttal came from The Economist, which criticised the author's supposedly affectionate insights as amounting to little more than a catalogue of perceived British inadequacies, noting acerbically that this may be why "the book has been immensely popular in France." Only occasionally did a supportive counter-analysis surface, such as that of the American academic Jim Obelkevich, who wrote in the journal Contemporary British History that "on every page [Daudy] takes some familiar British attitude or institution and throws fresh light on it."

== Other activities ==
Daudy began his own publishing house and co-founded the leading French literary prize now known as the Prix Décembre. He served as vice-president of the Royaumont Foundation (based at Royaumont Abbey) and also made his own Armagnac.

Along with the Hon. Robin Johnstone, Daudy was a founding Honorary Secretary of the Franco-British Council in 1972. He was awarded the MBE for his services to Anglo-French relations.

== Family ==
Daudy married first Janine Sommer (marriage dissolved), by whom he had two daughters, Martine and Florence, who both live and work in Paris. He married secondly Barbara Guidotti (marriage dissolved), by whom he had one daughter, Isabelle, a writer and psychologist based in Toulouse (and married to the economist Professor Paul Seabright of the University of Toulouse).

On his death in Beijing on 12 March 1994, Daudy was survived by his third wife, Marie-Christine Goüin (daughter of the philanthropists Henri and Isabel Goüin and a great-great-granddaughter of the 19th century French civil engineer, Ernest Goüin). By her he had a son Clément (married to the British artist Kate Daudy), an economist, and a daughter, Mathilde, a singer and documentary-maker (married to musicologist Marcel Pérès). The family continue to live at Royaumont Abbey.
