= Kate and Grant =

Artists based in London

Kate and Grant (Kate Daudy and Grant White) are an artistic partnership based in London. They meld poetry with clothing, by stitching words cut from felt onto vintage clothes.

== Exhibitions ==
In 2009, the pair exhibited at the Galerie Pixi Marie Victoire Poliakoff in Paris. In 2010, they were due to present a new collection in Shanghai.
