= Otto Schade =

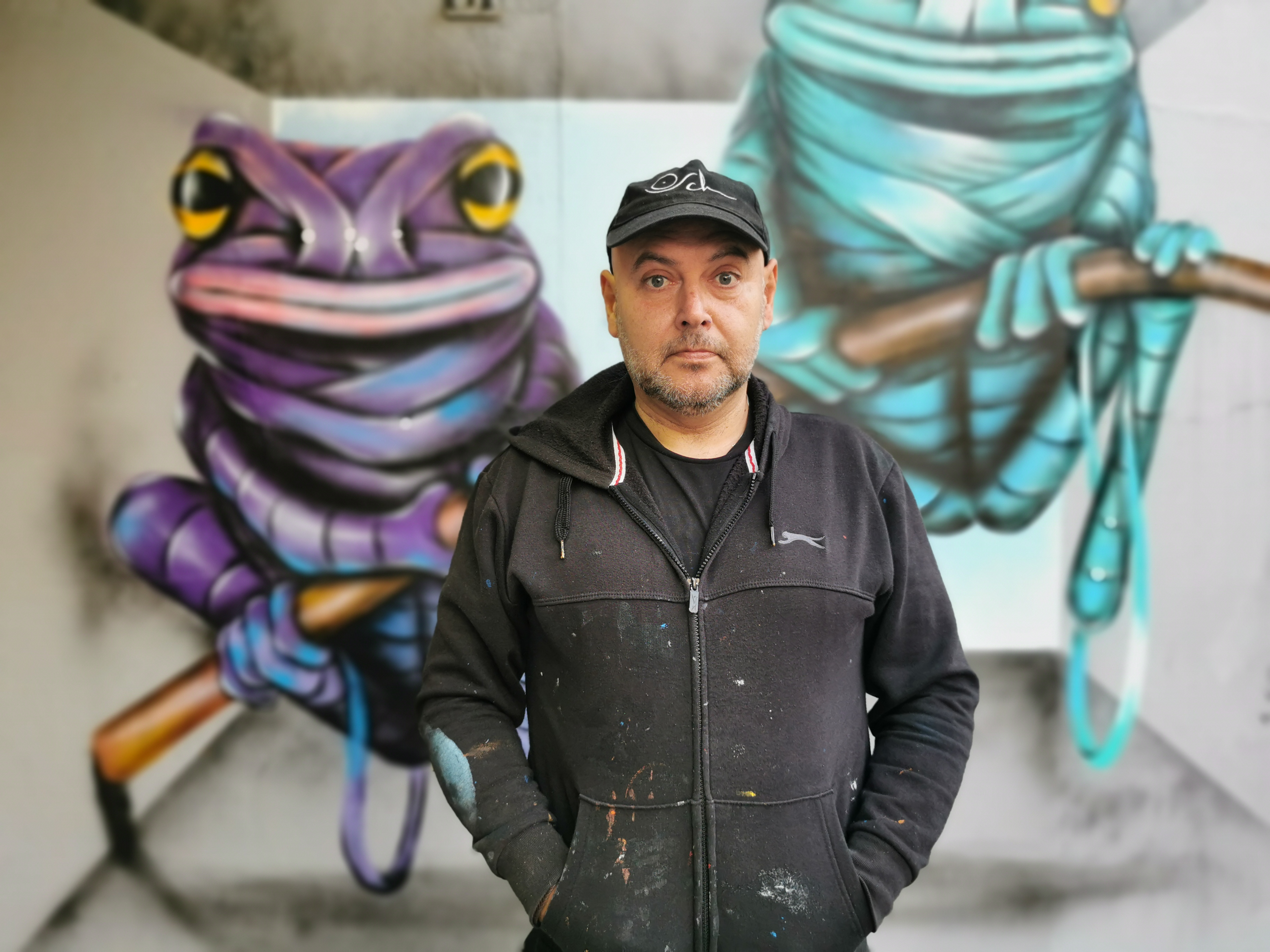
- Born: Otto Alexis Schade López; October 30, 1971 (age 54); Concepción, Chile
- Other name: Osch
- Education: University of the Bío Bío
- Occupations: Architect and visual artist
- Style: Street art

Otto Alexis Schade López (also known as "Osch") is a Chilean artist and architect based in London, United Kingdom, since 2006.

== Biography ==
At young age Otto Schade studied at St. John's School in Concepcion and Sagrados Corazones de Talcahuano. After receiving his higher education at the University of the Bío Bío where he studied Construction and Design Architecture in his native country, he worked on his own projects as an architect in Chile with colleagues Carlos Belmar and Pedro Caparros from 2000 till 2004.

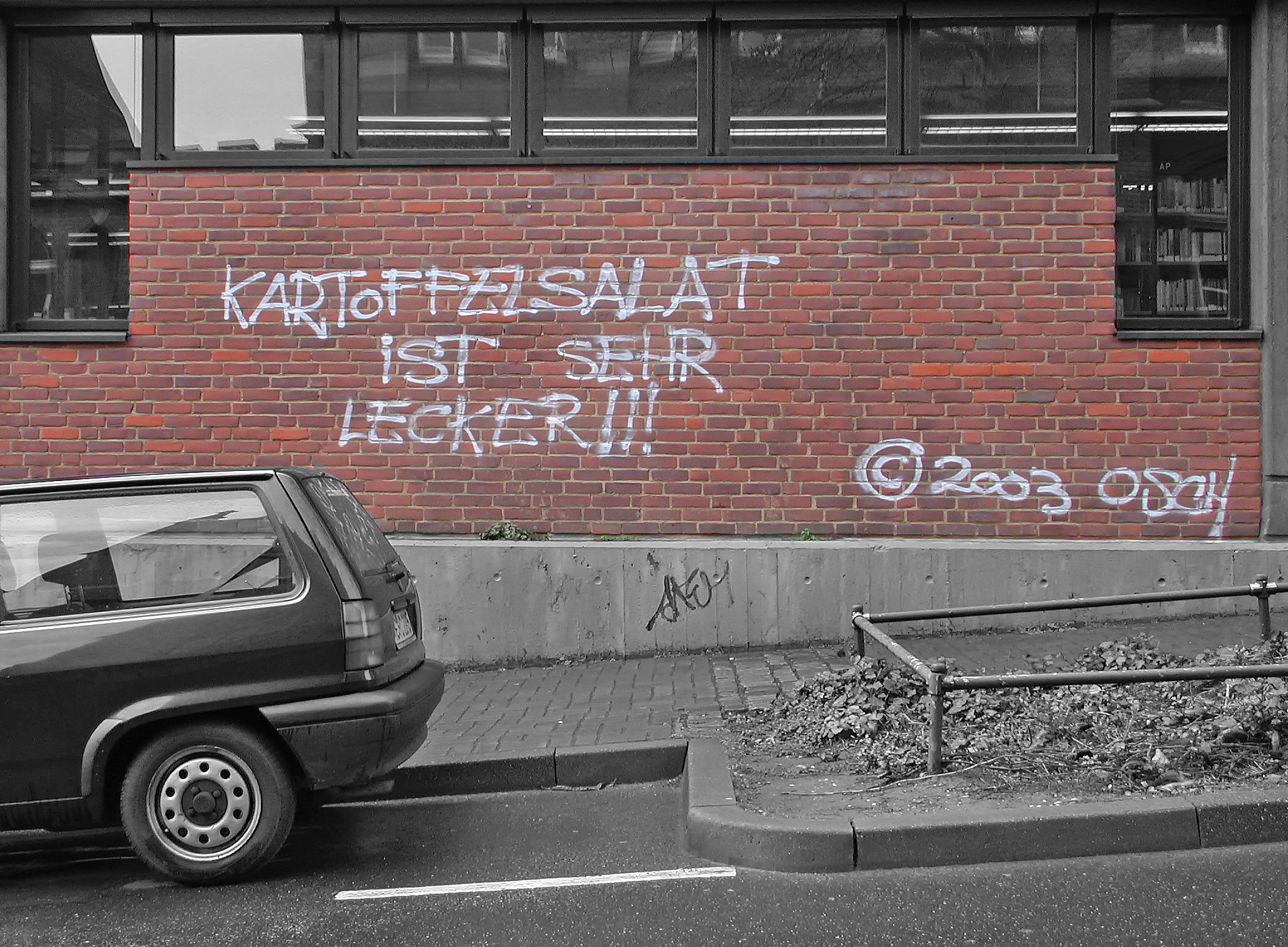
Osch's Aachen, Germany "Potato Salad" Graffiti

In Europe, Otto Schade worked for architecture design companies such as Benoy, Civicart and Zaha Hadids. He also gave lectures on Design at the Southbank University from 2008 till 2013.

After practicing architecture for more than a decade, Schade dedicated himself to creative skills, particularly to painting. As an artist he has exhibited his work in Chile, Russia, Sweden, France, Nederlands, United States, Hong Kong, Japan and Germany.

Schade's work includes abstract, surreal and pop art. In 2009 he started painting on the streets mainly in the UK urban center of Shoreditch (London) using the pseudonym "Osch". Schade came up with a quick and effective way to deliver his messages using simple 1 or 2 layer stencils. This became known as his 'Silhouettes and Sunsets' style. In particular he uses this style to criticize and ironically depict some of the world's current social issues.

In addition to his quicker stenciling techniques Otto has also developed a distinctive ribbon style. The ribbons form "bands of colour" that wrap around an object or a character.

Osch has painted at many art festivals such as the biggest street art festival in Europe, Upfest in Bristol. The "Sand, Sea and Spray" in Blackpool. "City of Colours" in Birmingham, "Wynwood" in Miami US and "Sunscape" in Malta as well as "Stick Together" and "Urban Art Festival" both in Amsterdam.
