= Dexter Dalwood =

British artist

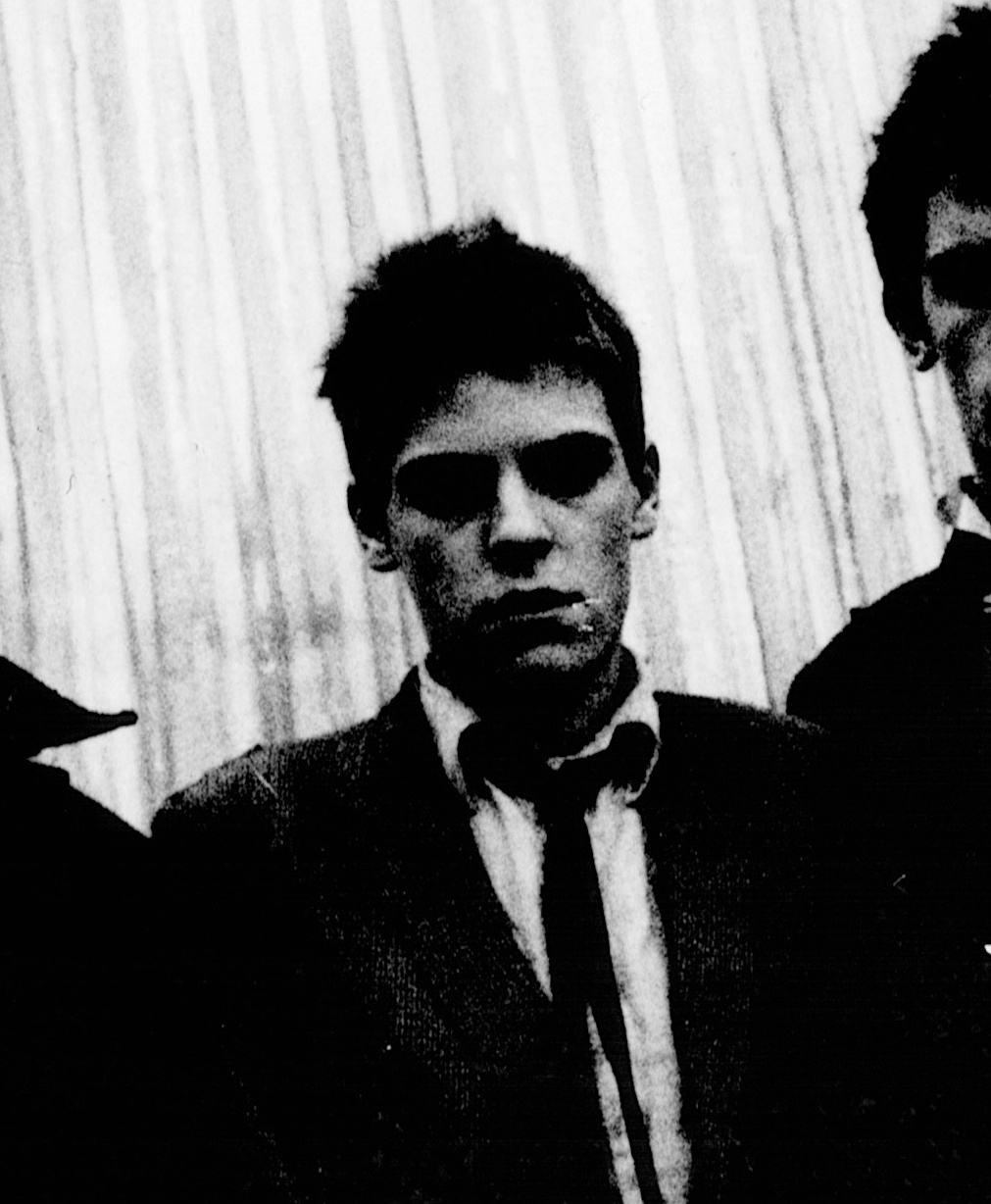
- Born: 1960 (age 65–66); Bristol, England
- Education: Saint Martin's School of Art; Royal College of Art
- Website: dexterdalwood.com

Dexter Dalwood (born 1960) is a British artist now based in Mexico City.

== Biography ==
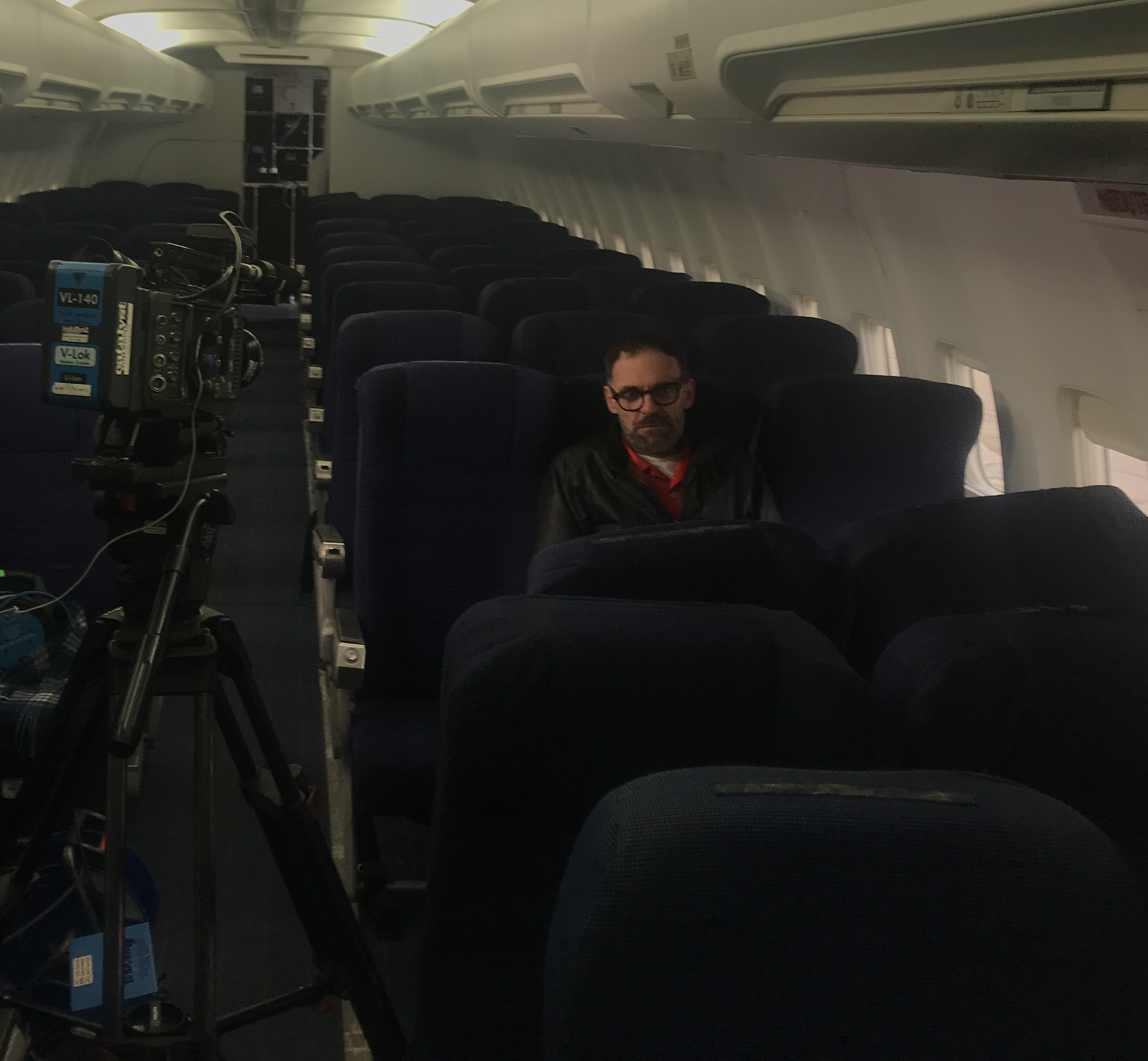
Dalwood in 2019

From 1981 until 1985 Dalwood attended Saint Martin's School of Art in London and, from 1988 until 1990, the Royal College of Art, London. Before becoming an artist he was the bass player of the Bristol punk rock band The Cortinas.

He is currently a Research Professor of Fine Art at Bath Spa University. Between 2011 and 2019 Dalwood was an Artist Trustee for the National Gallery, London, and served as the liaison Trustee on the Board of Trustees of the Tate Gallery between 2017 and 2019. He was nominated for the Turner Prize in 2010 following his mid- career retrospective at Tate St Ives, Cornwall.

He is also a contributor to The Burlington Magazine.

== Exhibitions ==
Dalwood has shown work in international and UK exhibitions including "Die Young Stay Pretty" at ICA London (1998), "New Neurotic Realism" at Saatchi Gallery, London (1999), "Remix" at Tate Liverpool (2002), 2002 Sydney Biennial, Dublin Contemporary 2011, "The Space Between" at Karsten Schubert, London (2012), "Paying No Attention I Notice Everything: Robert Walser and the Visual Arts" at Aargauer Kunsthaus, Aarau, Switzerland (2013), "The Venice Syndrome: Grandeur and Fall in the Art of Venice" at glHoltegaard, Holte, Denmark (2013), "Fighting History" at Tate Britain (2015), "Painters' Painters" at Saatchi Gallery, London (2016), "Age of Terror" at Imperial War Museum, London (2016), "True Faith" at Manchester Art Gallery (2016), "The Painting Show" (British Council) at CAC, Vilnius, Lithuania; Goyang Aram Nuri Arts Center, Korea; and Limerick City Gallery of Art, Ireland (2016/17), "Michael Jackson: On the Wall" at National Portrait Gallery, London (2018) and "Hello World. Revisioning a Collection" at Hamburger Bahnhof – Museum für Gegenwart – Berlin.

Solo exhibitions of new work include Gagosian Gallery shows in London (2000; 2007), Beverly Hills (2002; 2009) and New York (2004). Plus David Risley Gallery, Copenhagen (2009; 2012), Nolan Judin, Berlin (2011), Kunsthaus Centre d'art Pasquart, Switzerland (2013), Simon Lee Gallery – London (2014; 2019) and Hong Kong (2016) – and Galerie Hubert Winter, Vienna (2017).

A mid-career survey exhibition at Tate St Ives (2010) – touring to FRAC Champagne-Ardenne, Reims (2010) and CAC Malaga (2010) – was followed by a Turner Prize nomination.

== Bibliography ==
- Dave Hickey, Dexter Dalwood: New paintings, Gagosian Gallery, 2002. ISBN 1-880154-66-8.
- Michael Bracewell & Terry R Myers, Dexter Dalwood jrpringier, 2010 ISBN 978-3-03764-126-2
- Michael Archer, Felicity Lunn, Dexter Dalwood Verlag 2013 ISBN 978-3-86984-426-8
