= Ann-Marie James =

British artist

Ann-Marie James (born 1981) is a contemporary artist living and working in London.

== Life and education ==
James first studied Fine Art at Central Saint Martins College of Art and Design, completing her course in 2004, before completing her postgraduate studies at Wimbledon College of Art in 2012.

James has previously been awarded the Derek Hill Foundation Scholarship at the British School at Rome (2013–14), the MFI Flat Time House Graduate Award, supported by the John Latham Foundation, London (2012), the Jealous Graduate Print Prize, London (2012) and The Queen's Award, Central Saint Martins Scholarship Awards (2003).

== Art ==
James's works layer upon found images of paintings and photographs of sculptures from the 18th and 19th century, burying them in a mixture of oil and acrylic paints. Traces of the original image are sometimes visible through the accumulation of applied layers, in different techniques that include laser etching, pastiche of manga-style penmanship, and traditional painterly brushstrokes.

A reviewer said her paintings were executed with “great technical skill… cleverly achieving a kind of over-heated Baroque-Gothic-Manga-biomorphic collision”. He continues to explore how James deconstructs images from art-historical heritage, taking them apart until we are no longer able to recognise them, or discern them from one another, dissolving their semantic and cultural value.

In her later series on, James has explored the female form in the work of Alphonse Mucha, working directly on an original book of his work from 1897.

== Exhibitions ==
=== Solo ===
- Ann-Marie James: Le Monde Moderne, 2015, Edel Assanti, (in association with Karsten Schubert), London.
- Ann-Marie James: Musée Imaginaire, Knoerle & Battig, Winterthur.
- Ann-Marie James: Proserpina, 2013, Karsten Schubert, London.
- Ann-Marie James: Hanami, Soho Art Gallery, Osaka.

=== Group ===
- Jusqu'a ce Que Rien N'Arrive, 2016, Maison des Arts de Malakoff, Paris.
- PanoRAMA, 2015, Opere Scelte, Turin. Curated by Olga Gambari.
- The Open West, 2015, The Wilson, Cheltenham Art Gallery and Museum, Cheltenham.
- So Many Shadows, 2015, Bermondsey Project Space, London.
- Here We Go: A Changing Group Show, 2013, Karsten Schubert, London.
- Drawings, 2013, Karsten Schubert, London.
- Friday 13th, The British School at Rome, Rome.
