= Saatchi Gallery =

Physical and online contemporary art museum in Chelsea, London

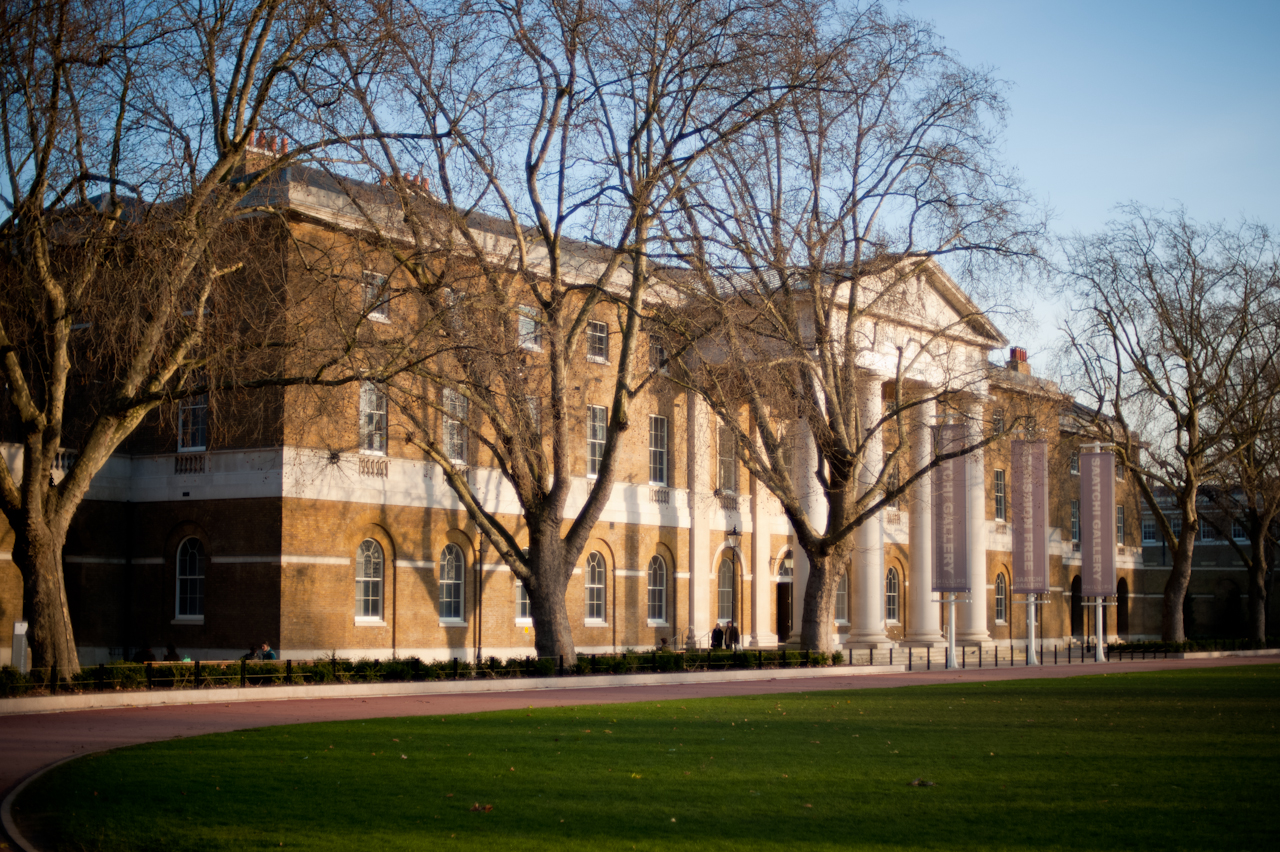

- Location within Central London
- Established: 1985; 41 years ago
- Location: Duke of York's Headquarters, King's Road; London, SW3; United Kingdom
- Coordinates: 51.4906°N 0.1589°W
- Visitors: 1,003,376 (2016)
- Public transit access: Sloane Square
- Website: saatchigallery.com

The Saatchi Gallery is a London gallery for contemporary art and an independent charity opened by Charles Saatchi in 1985. Exhibitions which drew upon the collection of Charles Saatchi, starting with US artists and minimalism, moving to the Damien Hirst-led Young British Artists, followed by shows purely of painting, led to Saatchi Gallery becoming a recognised authority in contemporary art globally. It has occupied different premises, first in North London, then the South Bank by the River Thames, and finally in Chelsea, Duke of York's HQ, its current location. In 2019, Saatchi Gallery became a registered charity.

Recent exhibitions include the major solo exhibition of the artist JR, JR: Chronicles, and London Grads Now in September 2019 lending the gallery spaces to graduates from leading fine art schools who experienced the cancellation of physical degree shows due to the pandemic.

The gallery's mission is to support artists and render contemporary art accessible to all by presenting projects in physical and digital spaces that are engaging, enlightening and educational for diverse audiences. The Gallery presents curated exhibitions on themes relevant and exciting in the context of contemporary creative culture. Its educational programmes aim to reveal the possibilities of artistic expression to young minds, encourage fresh thought and stimulate innovation.

In 2019, Saatchi Gallery transitioned to becoming a charitable organisation, registered with the Charity Commission for England and Wales under charity number 1182328, with the aim of reinvesting revenue into its core activities to support broad access to contemporary art.

== History ==
=== Boundary Road ===
==== Opening and US art ====
The Saatchi Gallery opened in 1985 in Boundary Road, St John's Wood, London in a disused paint factory of 30,000 square feet (2,800 m^{2}). The first exhibition was held March—October 1985 featured many works by American minimalist Donald Judd, American abstract painters Brice Marden and Cy Twombly, and American pop artist Andy Warhol. This was the first U.K. exhibition for Twombly and Marden.

These were followed throughout December 1985 – July 1986 by an exhibition of works by American sculptor John Chamberlain, American minimalists Dan Flavin, Sol LeWitt, Robert Ryman, Frank Stella, and Carl Andre. During September 1986 – July 1987, the gallery exhibited German artist Anselm Kiefer and American minimalist sculptor Richard Serra. The exhibited Serra sculptures were so large that the caretaker's flat adjoining the gallery was demolished to make room for them.

From September 1987 to January 1988, the Saatchi Gallery mounted two exhibitions entitled New York Art Now, featuring Jeff Koons, Robert Gober, Peter Halley, Haim Steinbach, Philip Taaffe, and Caroll Dunham. This exhibition introduced these artists to the U.K. for the first time. The blend of minimalism and pop art influenced many young artists who would later form the Young British Artists (YBA) group.

From April to October 1988, featured exhibited works by American figurative painter Leon Golub, German painter and photographer Sigmar Polke, and American Abstract Expressionist painter Philip Guston. During November 1988 – April 1989 a group show featured contemporary American artists, most prominently Eric Fischl. From April – October, the gallery hosted exhibitions of American minimalist Robert Mangold and American conceptual artist Bruce Nauman. From November 1989 – February 1990, a series of exhibitions featured School of London artists including Lucian Freud, Frank Auerbach, Leon Kossoff and Howard Hodgkin.

From January to July 1991, the gallery exhibited the work of American pop artist Richard Artschwager, American photographer Cindy Sherman, and British installation artist Richard Wilson. Wilson's piece 20:50, a room entirely filled with oil, became a permanent installation at the Saatchi Gallery's Boundary Road venue. September 1991 – February 1992 featured a group show, including American photographer Andres Serrano.

==== Young British Artists ====
In an abrupt move, Saatchi sold much of his collection of US art, and invested in a new generation of British artists, exhibiting them in shows with the title Young British Artists. The core of the artists had been brought together by Damien Hirst in 1988 in a seminal show called Freeze. Saatchi augmented this with his own choice of purchases from art colleges and "alternative" artist-run spaces in London. His first showing of the YBAs was in 1992, where the star exhibit was a Hirst vitrine containing a cow's head eaten by flies. Brooks, Richard. "Hirst's shark is sold to America", and the symbol of Britart worldwide.

More recently Saatchi said, "It's not that Freeze, the 1988 exhibition that Damien Hirst organised with this fellow Goldsmiths College students, was particularly good. Much of the art was fairly so-so and Hirst himself hadn't made anything much just a cluster of small colourful cardboard boxes placed high on a wall. What really stood out was the hopeful swagger of it all."

Saatchi's promotion of these artists dominated local art throughout the nineties and brought them to worldwide notice. Among the artists in the series of shows were Jenny Saville, Sarah Lucas, Gavin Turk, Jake and Dinos Chapman and Rachel Whiteread.

Sensation opened in September at the Royal Academy to much controversy and showed 110 works by 42 artists from the Saatchi collection. In 1999 Sensation toured to the Nationalgalerie at the Hamburger Bahnhof in Berlin in the autumn, and then to the Brooklyn Museum of Art, New York, creating unprecedented political and media controversy and becoming a touchstone for debate about the "morality" of contemporary art.

==== Neurotic Realism and philanthropy ====
Meanwhile, other shows with different themes were held in the gallery itself. In 1998, Saatchi launched a two part exhibition entitled Neurotic Realism. Though widely attacked by critics, the exhibition included many future international stars including; Cecily Brown, Ron Mueck, Noble and Webster, Dexter Dalwood, Martin Maloney, Dan Coombs, Chantal Joffe, Michael Raedecker and David Thorpe. In 2000 Ant Noises (an anagram of "sensation"), also in two parts, tried surer ground with work by Damien Hirst, Sarah Lucas, Jenny Saville, Rachel Whiteread, the Chapmans, Gavin Turk, Tracey Emin and Chris Ofili.

During this period the Collection was based at '30 Underwood St' an artist Collective of 50 studios and four galleries, the gallery made several large philanthropic donations including 100 artworks in 1999 to the Arts Council of Great Britain Collection, which operates a "lending library" to museums and galleries around the country, with the aim of increasing awareness and promoting interest in younger artists; 40 works by young British artists through the National Art Collections Fund, now known as the Art Fund, to eight museum collections across Britain in 2000; and 50 artworks to the Paintings in Hospitals program which provides a lending library of over 3,000 original works of art to NHS hospitals, hospices and health centers throughout England, Wales and Ireland in 2002.

After the Gallery moved from Boundary Road, the site was redeveloped by the Ardmore Group for residential use, under the name 'The Collection'.

=== County Hall ===
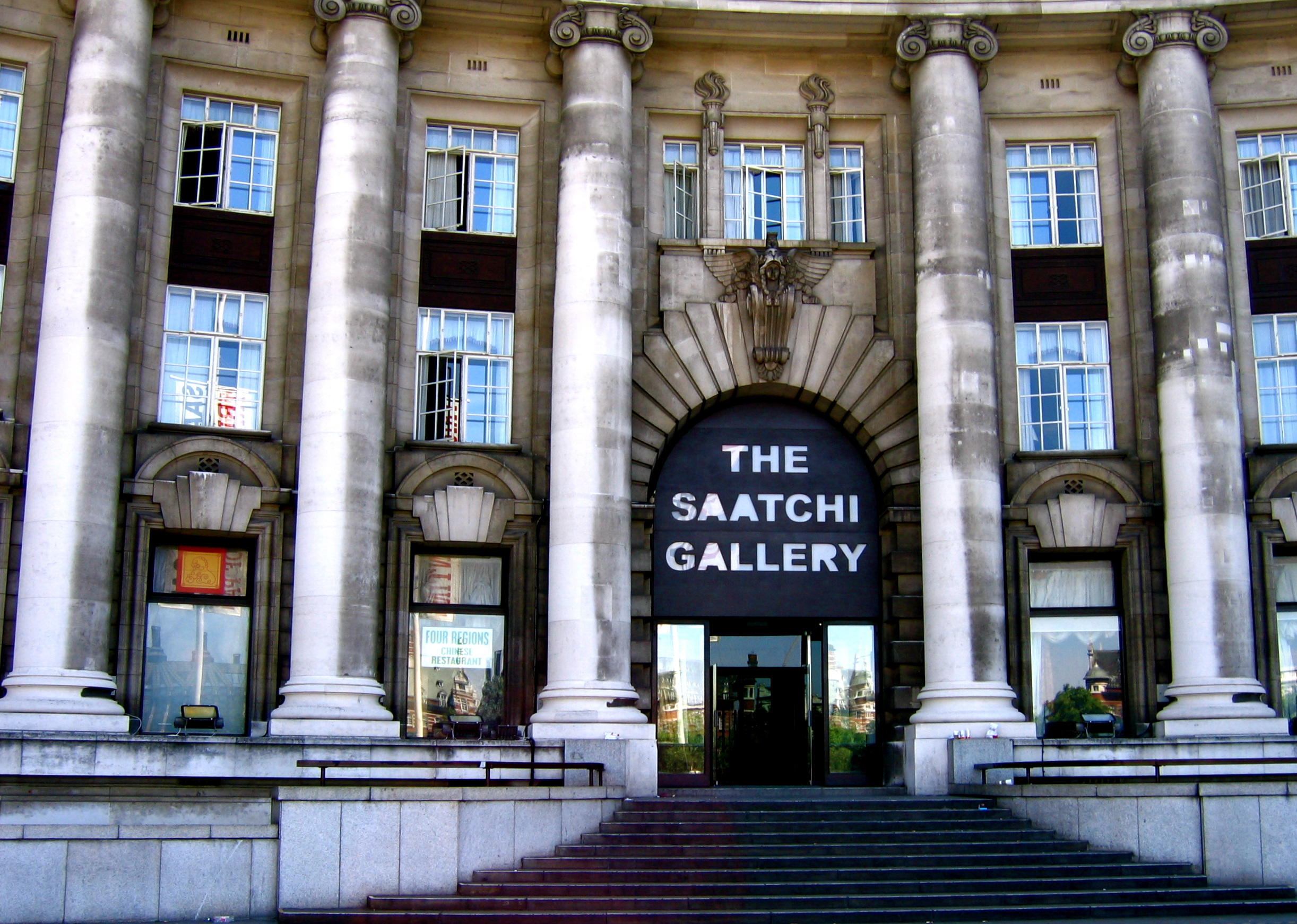
The Saatchi Gallery was based at County Hall 2003–2005.

In April 2003, the gallery moved to County Hall, the Greater London Council's former headquarters on the South Bank, occupying 40,000 square feet (3,700 m^{2}) of the ground floor. 1,000 guests attended the launch, which included a "nude happening" of 200 naked people staged by artist Spencer Tunick.

The opening exhibition included a retrospective by Damien Hirst, as well as work by other YBAs, such as Jake and Dinos Chapman and Tracey Emin alongside some longer-established artists including John Bratby, Paula Rego and Patrick Caulfield.

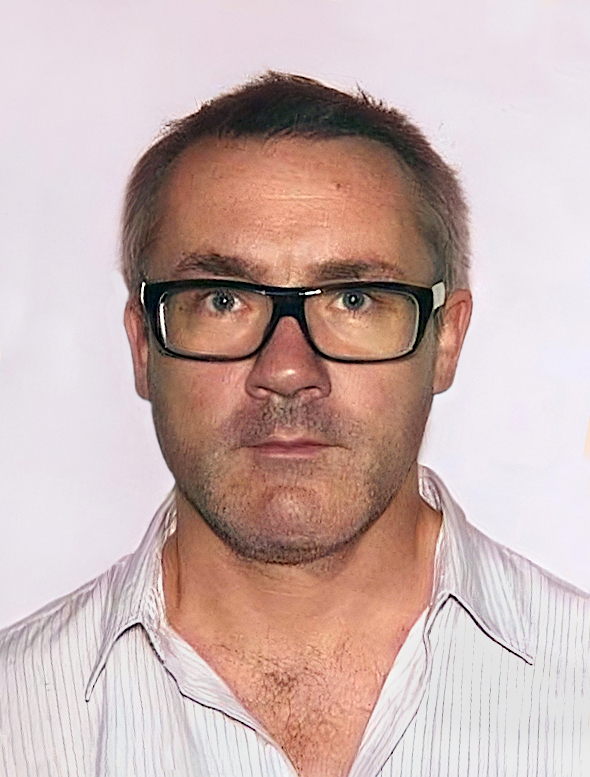
Damien Hirst

Hirst disassociated himself from the retrospective to the extent of not including it in his CV. He was angry that a Mini car that he had decorated for charity with his trademark spots was being exhibited as serious work. The show also scuppered a prospective Hirst retrospective at Tate Modern. He said Saatchi was "childish" and "I'm not Charles Saatchi's barrel-organ monkey ... He only recognises art with his wallet ... he believes he can affect art values with buying power, and he still believes he can do it." (In July 2004, Hirst said, "I respect Charles. There's not really a feud. If I see him, we speak, but we were never really drinking buddies.")

On 24 May 2004, a fire in the Momart storage warehouse destroyed many works from the collection, including the Tracey Emin work Everyone I Have Ever Slept With 1963–95 ("the tent"), and Jake and Dinos Chapman's tableau Hell. A gallery spokesman said that Saatchi was distraught at the loss: "It is terrible. A significant part of the work in his collection has been affected." One art insurance specialist valued the lost work at £50m.

In 2004, Saatchi's recent acquisitions (including Stella Vine) were featured in New Blood, a show of mostly little-known artists working in a variety of media. It received a hostile critical reception, which caused Saatchi to speak out angrily against the critics.

Saatchi, said that most YBAs would prove "nothing but footnotes" in history, and sold works from his YBA collection, beginning in December 2004 with Hirst's iconic shark for nearly £7 million (he had bought it for £50,000 in 1991), followed by at least twelve other works by Hirst. Four works by Ron Mueck, including key works Pinocchio and Dead Dad, went for an estimated £2.5 million. Mark Quinn's Self, bought in 1991 for a reported £13,000, sold for £1.5 million. Saatchi also sold all but one work by Sam Taylor-Wood (he showed five in the Sensation show). The sale was compared to his sale in the 1980s of most of his postwar American art collection. David Lee said: "Charles Saatchi has all the hallmarks of being a dealer, not a collector. He first talks up the works and then sells them."

In 2005, Saatchi changed direction, announcing a year-long, three-part series (subsequently extended to two years and seven parts), The Triumph of Painting. The opening exhibition focused on established European painters, including Marlene Dumas, Martin Kippenberger, Luc Tuymans and Peter Doig, who had not previously received such significant U.K. exposure. Shows in the series were scheduled to introduce young painters from America like Dana Schutz and Germans such as Matthias Weischer, as well as Saatchi's choice of up and coming British talent.

The gallery received 800,000 visitors a year. In 2006, 1,350 schools organised group visits to the gallery.

In 2006, a selection from The Triumph of Painting was exhibited in Leeds Art Gallery and USA Today: New American Art from the Saatchi Gallery opened at the Royal Academy. This exhibition toured to The State Hermitage Museum, St. Petersburg, Russia in 2007.

==== Court case ====
The gallery's tenancy of County Hall had ongoing difficulties with Makoto Okamoto, London branch manager of the owners, who Saatchi complained had kicked artworks and sealed off the disabled toilets. On 28 September 2005, the gallery announced a move to new and larger premises in the Duke of York's Headquarters, Chelsea, though Saatchi said it was "tragic" to leave. On 6 October 2005, a court case began, brought by the owners and landlord of County Hall, the Shirayama Shokusan Company and Cadogan Leisure Investments, against Danovo (Saatchi was its majority shareholder), trading as the Saatchi Gallery, for alleged breach of conditions, including a two-for-one ticket offer in Time Out magazine and exhibition of work in unauthorized areas. The judgment went against the gallery; the judge, Sir Donald Ratee, and ordered the gallery off the premises because of a "deliberate disregard" of the landlords' rights.

On 8 October 2006, Danovo was forced into liquidation with debts around £1.8 million, having failed to pay the court-ordered penalty.

=== Duke of York's HQ ===
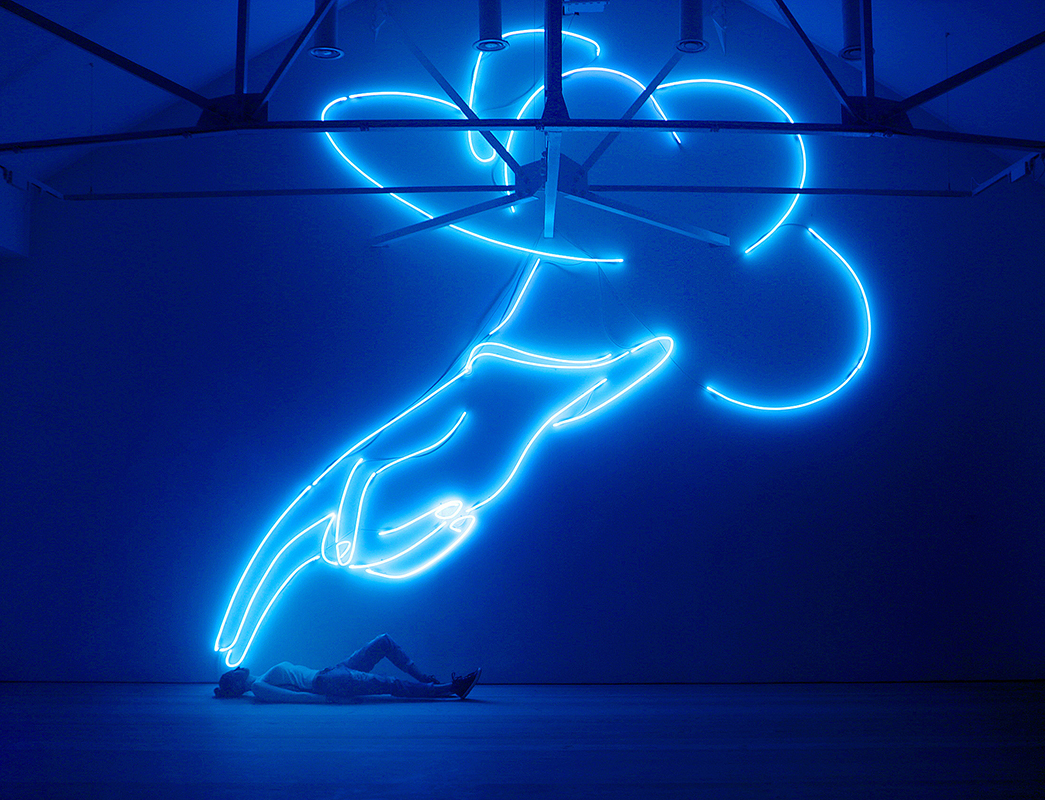
The Blessing Hand by Stepan Ryabchenko in Saatchi Gallery

On 9 October 2008, the Gallery opened its new premises, described in The Observer as one of "the most beautiful art spaces in London", in the 70,000-square-foot (6,500 m^{2}) Duke of York's HQ on King's Road, London, near Sloane Square. The building was refurbished by architects Paul Davis + Partners and Allford Hall Monaghan Morris. It consists of 15 equally-proportioned exhibition spaces "as light, as high, and as beautifully proportioned as any in London".

The main opening exhibition was of new Chinese art, The Revolution Continues: New Art From China, bringing together the work of twenty-four young Chinese artists in a survey of painting, sculpture and installation, including Zhang Huan, Li Songsong, Zhang Xiaogang, Zhang Haiying and conceptual artists Sun Yuan & Peng Yu. The show's focus was on political issues surrounding China's Cultural Revolution and also the contemporary political context. The decision to open with The Revolution Continues was directly influenced by global interest in China as a result of the 2008 Beijing Olympics. Jackie Wullschlager in the Financial Times said it was "the most persuasive showing of contemporary Chinese art yet mounted in this country", and, contrasting it with the "deadly" contemporaneous Turner Prize show, "Saatchi's collection of Chinese art is one that Tate would kill for, and could not begin to afford"; she said that it was "an example of a private museum grand and serious enough to compete with national institutions."

More recent exhibitions include the London-leg of the touring show Tutankhamun: Treasures of the Golden Pharaoh, the solo exhibition of the artist JR, JR: Chronicles, and London Grads Now in September 2019 lending the gallery spaces to graduates from leading fine art schools who experienced the cancellation of a physical degree show due to the pandemic (described by critic Waldemar Januszczak in The Sunday Times as "a good idea. Saatchi Gallery deserves a slap on the back for organising this selection of work from grads shows, a highlight of every art student's education". The Gallery also hosts the annual Carmignac Photojournalism Award and various art fairs and global events including music group BICEP's live global stream of their new album in March 2021. To mark its 40th anniversary, the Gallery opened The Long Now: Saatchi Gallery at 40 on 5 November 2025, an expansive group exhibition spanning two floors and nine exhibition spaces, supported by De Beers London. Curated by Philippa Adams, who served as Senior Director of Saatchi Gallery from 1999 to 2020, the exhibition brought together newly commissioned works and historic pieces by artists including Jenny Saville, Damien Hirst, Gavin Turk, Richard Wilson, Alex Katz, and Olafur Eliasson, alongside emerging voices. Central to the show was Wilson's installation 20:50, presented for the first time on the top floor of the Duke of York's HQ building. The gallery is currently led by Director Paul Foster, who described 2025 as "a momentous year for the Gallery," marking "40 years of showcasing contemporary art to a wide audience."

==== Philosophy ====
Saatchi Gallery's goal is to show contemporary work that would otherwise not be seen in London institutions such as Tate Modern. The gallery's ex head of development, Rebecca Wilson, said, "The gallery's guiding principle is to show what is being made now, the most interesting artists of today. It's about drawing people's attentions to someone who might be tomorrow's Damien Hirst." The gallery's aim is to make art more accessible to the mainstream, rather than an exclusive artworld pursuit.

== Timeline ==
1985 – 30,000-square-foot (2,800 m^{2}) Saatchi Gallery opens at Boundary Road, London NW8, featuring works by Donald Judd, Brice Marden, Cy Twombly and Andy Warhol. This was the first UK exhibition for Twombly and Marden.

1986 – Exhibits Anselm Kiefer and Richard Serra.

1987 – The New York Art Now show introduces American artists including Jeff Koons, Robert Gober, Ashley Bickerton, Carroll Dunham and Phillip Taaffe to the UK.

1988–1991 ¬– Introduces artists including Leon Golub, Phillip Guston, Sigmar Polke, Bruce Nauman, Richard Artschwager and Cindy Sherman to London.

1992 – Curates its first Young British Artists show Damien Hirst, Marc Quinn, Rachel Whiteread, Gavin Turk, Glenn Brown, Sarah Lucas, Jenny Saville and Gary Hume were all presented in these exhibitions.

1996 – Sixth Young British Artists show featuring Dan Coombs

1997 – Opens Sensation: Young British Art from the Saatchi Gallery at the Royal Academy featuring 42 artists including The Chapman Brothers, Marcus Harvey, Damien Hirst, Ron Mueck, Jenny Saville, Sarah Lucas & Tracey Emin. Sensation attracted over 300,000 visitors, a record for a contemporary exhibition.

1999 – Sensation at the Hamburger Bahnhof in Berlin.

1999 – Sensation tours to Brooklyn Museum of Art.

1999 – Donates 100 artworks to the Arts Council of Great Britain Collection, which operates a 'lending library' to museums and galleries around Britain.

2000 – Donates 40 works through the National Art Collections Fund to eight museums across Britain.

2000 – Begins a series of one person shows of major international figures mostly new to Britain, including Duane Hanson, Boris Mikhailov and Alex Katz. Shows entitled Young Americans and Eurovision introduce artists including John Currin, Andreas Gursky, Charles Ray, Richard Prince, Rineke Dijkstra, Lisa Yuskavage and Elizabeth Peyton.

2001 – I am a Camera exhibition opens at the Gallery, showing photography and other related works where traditional boundaries are blurred as photographs influence paintings, and paintings influence photographs. The show included work by many other artists new in the UK.

2002 – Donates 50 artworks to the Paintings in Hospitals program which lends over 3,000 originals to NHS hospitals, hospices and health centers throughout England, Wales and Ireland.

2003 – Moves to County Hall, the Greater London Council's former headquarters on the South Bank, creating a 40,000 square feet (3,700 m^{2}) exhibition space. The opening show included a Hirst retrospective as well as works by other YBAs such as the Chapman Brothers, Tracey Emin, Jenny Saville and Sarah Lucas.

2004 – A fire in the Momart storage warehouse destroyed many works from the collection, including the major Tracey Emin work Everyone I Have Ever Slept With 1963–95 ("the tent"), and Jake and Dinos Chapman's tableau Hell.

2005 – Launches a year-long, three-part series exhibition, The Triumph of Painting. The opening exhibition focuses on influential European painters Marlene Dumas, Martin Kippenberger, Luc Tuymans, Peter Doig, Jörg Immendorff, and followed with younger painters including Albert Oehlen, Wilhelm Sasnal and Thomas Scheibitz.

2005 – Expanded into the Duke of York's Headquarters building in Chelsea. This put a halt to London shows while the new premises were being prepared.

2005 – Exhibited a selection of works from The Triumph of Painting in Leeds Art Gallery.

2006 – During the period between premises, the Saatchi Online website began an open-access section where artists could upload works of art and their biographies onto personal pages. The site currently has over 100,000 artist profiles and receives over 68 million hits a day, ranking at 316 in the Alexa Top 50,000 World Websites.

2006 – In association with the Guardian newspaper, opened the first ever reader-curated exhibition, showing the work of 10 artists registered on Saatchi Online. In November launched a new section within Saatchi Online exclusively for art students, called Stuart. Art students from all over the world were able to create home pages with images of their art, photos, lists of their favorite artists, books, films and television shows, and links to their friends' pages. Other sections on Saatchi Online include; chat, a daily art magazine, a forum, written and video blogs, as well as sections for street art, photography and illustration.

2006 – USA Today: New American Art from the Saatchi Gallery opens at the Royal Academy.

2007 – Added a new online feature called "Museums around the World" hosting over 2,800 museums, showing collection highlights, exhibitions and other relevant information. 2,700 Colleges and Universities from around the world also offer their profiles, enabling potential students to examine their prospectuses.

2007 – USA Today: New American Art from the Saatchi Gallery toured to The State Hermitage Museum, St Petersburg, Russia.

2008 – Reopens on the 9 October in the entire 70,000 square feet (6,500 m^{2}) Duke of York's Headquarters building on Kings Road in Chelsea, London, with The Revolution Continues: New Art from China.

2014 – Saatchi Online sold to Demand Media for $17 million and rebranded as SaatchiArt.com.

2019 – Saatchi Gallery transitioned to becoming a charitable organisation

== Saatchi Online ==
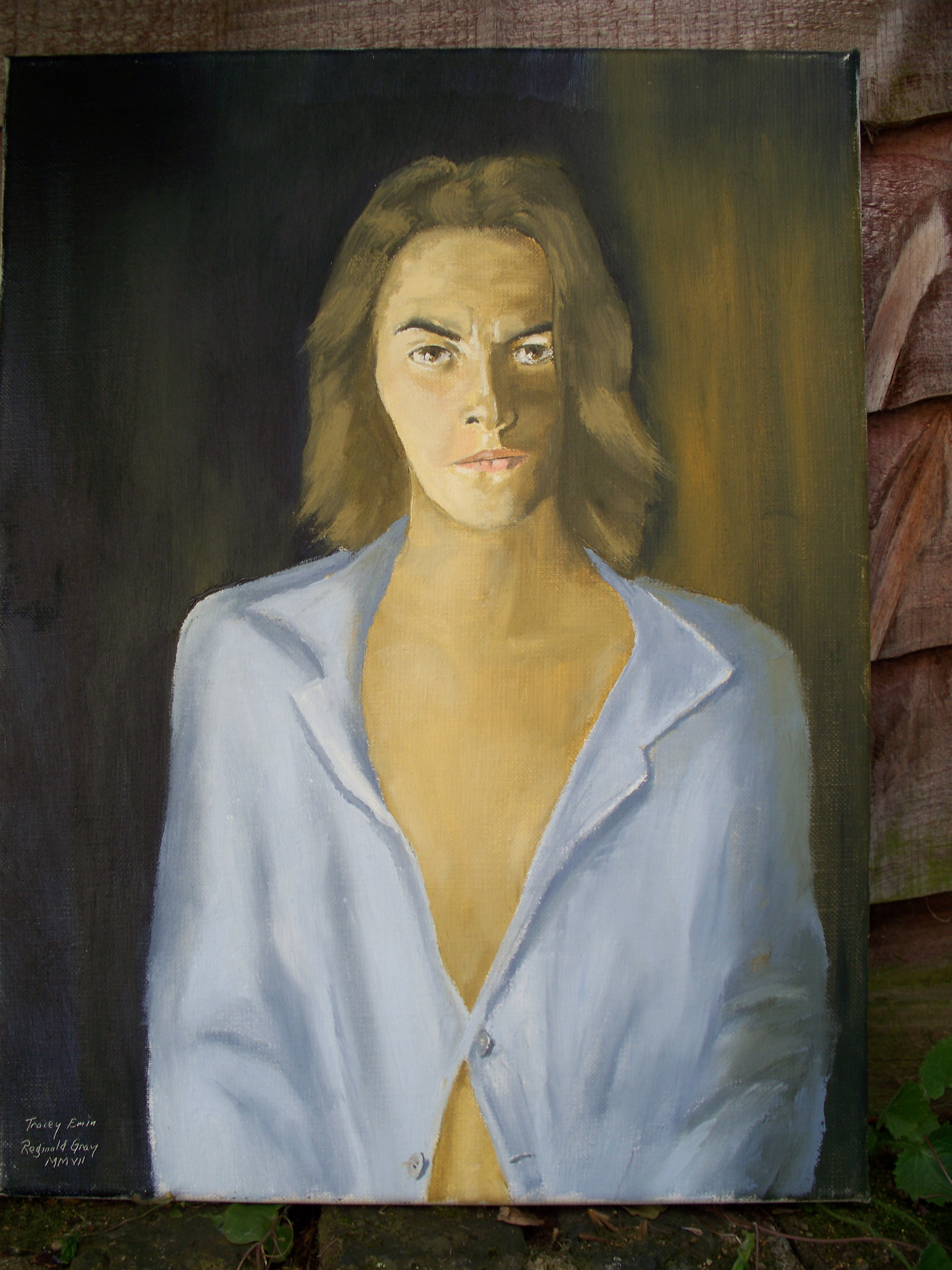
Portrait of Tracey Emin by Irish artist Reginald Gray

In 2006, during the period in limbo between premises, the gallery's website began an open-access section, including Your Gallery, where artists can upload up to twenty works and a biography to a personal page. Over 100,000 artists had done so as of 2010, and the site receives an estimated 73 million hits a day. Your Gallery was later rebranded as Saatchi Online. In September 2008, Alexa Internet ranked Saatchi Gallery among the leading 300 websites in the world. In March 2012, Alexa ranked Saatchi Online's position at 30,454. In November 2007, it was estimated that professional artists registered sell over $100 million of art directly from the site annually. In 2008, Saatchi Online launched a saleroom section that hosts over 84,000 entries from artists wishing to sell their work. For original work, Saatchi Online takes a 30% commission on the final sale price. If a Promotional discount code is offered, SO and Artist will split it equally. For prints, artists are entitled to 70% of the profit on each sale. Artists are also responsible for the costs of print production.

In October 2006, the Saatchi Gallery in association with The Guardian newspaper opened the first ever reader-curated exhibition, showing the work of 10 Saatchi Online artists. Users may also be featured in the Saatchi Online stall at various art fairs. In November 2006 the gallery launched a new section exclusively for art students, called Stuart. Stuart also hosts an annual competition, 4 New Sensations, in association with Channel 4.

Other spaces on Saatchi Online including a forum, live chat, blogs, videos, photography and illustration. The site also publishes grant and funding opportunities. A daily magazine features 24-hour news updated every 15 minutes, as well as articles and reviews by art critics such as Jerry Saltz and Matthew Collings. The site recently began broadcasting an online television channel with video access to art openings, artists' studios, performances and interviews.

Interactive features include the weekly Showdown competition, where users can win an exhibition spot, the Online Studio for creating art (each month a critic selects a winner in whose name a £500 donation is made to a children's charity) a Crits section in which artists can comment on each other's work, and the Street Art section for graffiti, murals, and performance art.

"Museums around the World" features over 3,300 museums. These include the Metropolitan Museum of Art, The Museum of Modern Art, the Tate, the London National Gallery, the Louvre, and the State Hermitage, as well as small museums.

As of July 2008, 4,300 art dealers and commercial galleries have profiles on the site. Over 2,800 universities and colleges have uploaded prospectuses and student information, including Yale, Harvard, the University of Cambridge and the University of Oxford, as well as local art colleges. Over 1,500 schools have uploaded pupils' work. Schools range from Eton College to small Primary and High schools. The Portfolio School Art Prize is open to schools with pupils between 5 and 17.

A Mandarin version allows Chinese artists to upload their profiles in Chinese and translates them into English. There is also a Chinese language chatroom, forum, and blog. The site provides automated translations into many languages; Russian, Spanish and Portuguese versions of the site are planned.

Saatchi Online was sold to Demand Media in August 2014, and was rebranded as SaatchiArt.com. The old Saatchi Online website now redirects there. Saatchi Art is an online marketplace where artists can go to sell originals and prints of their artwork to users of the site, with the website handling the details of the transaction and taking a 30% cut.

== Controversies ==
- Artists such as Sandro Chia and Sean Scully, to whom Saatchi had been a patron in the late 1970s and early 1980s, felt betrayed by him when their work was sold in bulk from his collection, and Saatchi was accused of destroying Chia's career. Saatchi said that the matter only became an issue because Chia "had a psychological need to be rejected in public" and is now "most famous for being dumped", but that he had only ever owned seven Chias, which he sold back to Chia's two dealers, who re-sold them easily to museums or notable collectors. Saatchi claimed that a sale of strong work can help to galvanise the market for them.

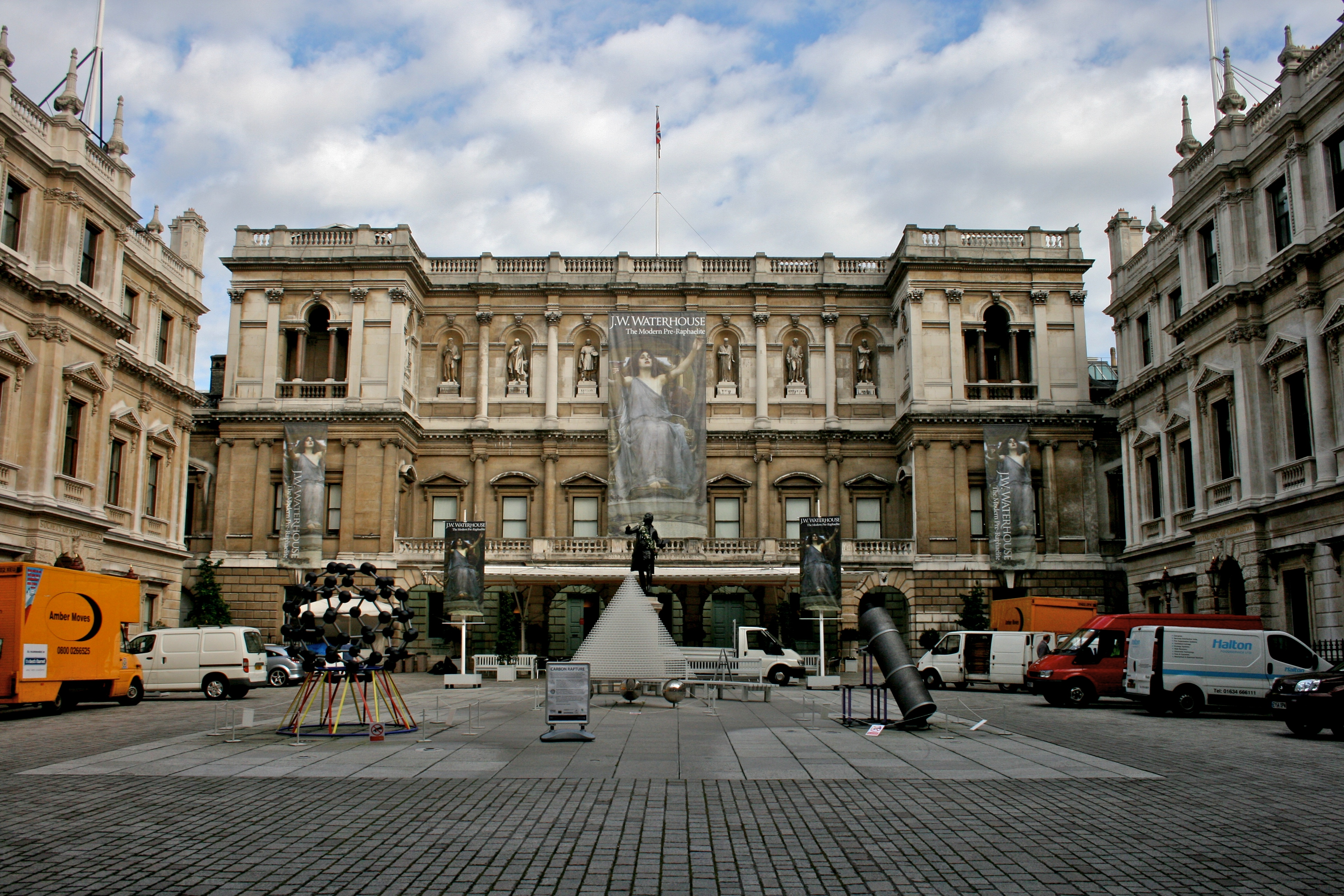
The Royal Academy, London, where Sensation opened

- In 1997, in Sensation, London, Marcus Harvey's giant painting of Myra Hindley made from children's hand prints was attacked by two men with ink and eggs, and picketed by the Mothers Against Murder and Aggression protest group, accompanied by Winnie Johnson, the mother of one of Hindley's Moors murders victims. The work was restored and exhibited.
- The Sensation show in New York offended Mayor Rudolph Giuliani, because of Chris Ofili's painting, The Holy Virgin Mary, which incorporates elephant dung. Giuliani, who had seen the work in the catalog but not in the show, called it "sick stuff" and threatened to withdraw the annual $7 million City Hall grant from the Brooklyn Museum hosting the show, because "You don't have a right to government subsidy for desecrating somebody else's religion." John O'Connor, the Cardinal of New York, said, "one must ask if it is an attack on religion itself", and the president of America's biggest group of Orthodox Jews, Mandell Ganchrow, called it "deeply offensive". William A Donohue, President of the Catholic League for Religious and Civil Rights, said the work "induces revulsion". Giuliani started a lawsuit to evict the museum, and Arnold Lehman, the museum director, filed a federal lawsuit against Giuliani for breaching the First Amendment.

Hillary Clinton and the New York Civil Liberties Union spoke up for the museum. The editorial board of The New York Times said Giuliani's stance "promises to begin a new Ice Age in New York's cultural affairs." The paper also carried a petition in support signed by 106, including Susan Sarandon, Steve Martin, Norman Mailer, Arthur Miller, Kurt Vonnegut and Susan Sontag, saying that the mayor "blatantly disregards constitutional protection for freedom of the arts." Ofili, who is Roman Catholic, said, "elephant dung in itself is quite a beautiful object." The museum produced a yellow stamp, saying the artworks on show "may cause shock, vomiting, confusion, panic, euphoria and anxiety." and Ofili's painting was shown behind a Plexiglass screen, guarded by a museum attendant and an armed police officer. Jeffrey Hogrefe, New York Observer art critic, said, "They wanted to get some publicity and they got it. I think it was pretty calculated." The editor-in-chief of the New York Art & Auction magazine, Bruce Wolmer, said: "When the row eventually fades the only smile will be on the face of Charles Saatchi, a master self-promoter." Giuliani lost his court case and was forced to restore funding.

- Sensation was scheduled to open in June 2000 at the National Gallery of Australia, but was cancelled. Director Brian Kennedy said that, although it was due to be funded by the Australian government, it was "too close to the market", since finance for the Brooklyn exhibition included $160,000 from Saatchi, who owned the work, $50,000 from Christie's, who had sold work for Saatchi, and $10,000 from dealers of many of the artists. Kennedy said he was unaware of this when he accepted the show; Saatchi's contribution, the largest single one, was not disclosed by the Brooklyn Museum until it appeared in court documents. When the show opened in London at the Royal Academy, there had been criticisms that it would raise the value of the work.

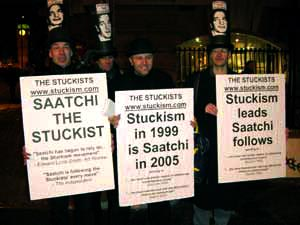
The Stuckists picket the opening of The Triumph of Painting at the gallery.

- In 2004, media controversy arose over two paintings by Stella Vine. One was of Princess Diana called Hi Paul Can You Come Over, showing the Princess with blood dripping from her lips. The other was of drug user Rachel Whitear, whose body was being exhumed at the time; Whitear's parents and the police appealed for the painting to be withdrawn, but it was not.
- In 2004, the Stuckists reported Saatchi to the Office of Fair Trading alleging unfair competition. The complaint was not upheld. They also picketed the opening of The Triumph of Painting claiming that Saatchi had stolen their ideas. (Vine had previously been involved with the Stuckists.)
- In 2006, "USA Today" provoked controversy in the media and among some Royal Academicians who called for certain works to be installed in an 'adult-only' room. A notice advising 'parental guidance' before viewing the work of Dash Snow and Gerald Davis was posted by the Royal Academy, on a wall outside the room in which the controversial works were hung. These were Dash Snow's 'Fuck the Police', in which newspaper cuttings relating to police corruption are smeared with the artist's own semen, and a painting titled Monica by Gerald Davis in which a young woman engages in fellatio.

== Artists shown at the Saatchi Gallery ==
=== Boundary Road ===
1985

- Donald Judd
- Brice Marden
- Cy Twombly
- Andy Warhol

1986

- Carl Andre
- Sol LeWitt
- Robert Ryman
- Frank Stella
- Dan Flavin

1987

- Anselm Kiefer
- Richard Serra
- Jeff Koons
- Robert Gober
- Philip Taaffe
- Carroll Dunham

1988

- Leon Golub
- Philip Guston
- Sigmar Polke

1989

- Robert Mangold
- Bruce Nauman

1990

- Leon Kossoff
- Frank Auerbach
- Lucian Freud

1991

- Richard Artschwager
- Andreas Serrano
- Cindy Sherman

1992

- Damien Hirst
- Rachel Whiteread

1993

- Sarah Lucas
- Marc Quinn

1994

- Jenny Saville
- Paula Rego

1995

- Gavin Turk
- Glenn Brown
- Gary Hume

1996

- Janine Antoni
- Tony Oursler
- Richard Prince
- Charles Ray
- Kiki Smith

1997

- Duane Hanson
- Andreas Gursky
- Martin Honert
- Thomas Ruff
- Thomas Schütte

1998

- David Salle
- Jessica Stockholder
- Terry Winters
- John Currin
- Tom Friedman
- Josiah McElheny
- Laura Owens
- Elizabeth Peyton
- Lisa Yuskavage

1999

- Alex Katz
- Martin Maloney
- Dexter Dalwood
- Ron Mueck
- Cecily Brown
- Noble and Webster
- Michael Raedecker

2000

- Boris Mikhailov

2012

- Igor Kalinauskas

2013

- Karen Heagle

2014

- Aristide Loria (ALO)

2015

- Aristide Loria (ALO)

2017

- Aristide Loria (ALO)

2018

- Philip Pearlstein
- Sara Barker
- Maria Farrar
- Kirstine Roepstorff
- Juno Calypso
- Gavin Turk
- Pussy Riot
- Pyotr Pavlensky
- Oleg Kulik

2019

- Johnnie Cooper
- Richard Billingham
- Aleksandra Mir
- Simon Bedwell
- Michael Cline
- Jessica Craig-Martin
- Valerie Hegarty
- John Stezaker
- Marianne Vitale
- Philip Colbert
- Mao Jianhua
- Kate Daudy
- Ibrahim El-Salahi
- Nancy Cadogan
- James Alec Hardy
- Vinca Petersen
- Conrad Shawcross
- Dave Swindells
- Seana Gavin
- Cleo Campert
- Toby Mott
- Marshmallow Laser Feast

2020

- Khushna Sulaman-Butt
- Jahnavi Inniss
- Francesca Mollett

2021

- JR
- Ben Turnbull
- Dominic Beattie
- Tommaso Protti
- Will Cruickshank
- Alice Wilson
- Laura White
- Neil Zakiewicz
- Stella McCartney
- Isabel + Helen
- Sara Dare
- Tim Ellis
- Jo Hummel
- Anna Liber Lewis
- Anisa Zahedi
- Dan Rawlings
- Joakim Allgulander
- Jake & Dinos Chapman
- Morag Myerscough
- Sara Pope
- Anthony Burrill
- Chris Levine
- Jess Wilson
- Ally McIntyre
- Andrew Millar
- Dan Hays
- Faye Bridgwater
- Heath Kane
- Joanna Ham
- Mimei Thompson
- Realf Heygate
- Aristide Loria (ALO)

2025

- Aristide Loria (ALO)

=== County Hall ===
- Damien Hirst
- The Chapman Brothers
- New Blood
- Galleon & Other Stories
- The Triumph of Painting

=== Duke of York's HQ ===
- The Revolution Continues: New Art From China
- Unveiled: New Art from the Middle East
- The Triumph of Painting
- Out Of Focus: Photography Now
- The Power Of Paper
- Black Mirror
- Penumbra
- Sweet Harmony: Rave Today
- Kaleidoscope
- JR: Chronicles
- London Grads Now
- In Bloom
- RHS Botanical Art & Photography Show 2021
- Right Here Right Now
- Carmignac Photojournalism Award
- Antisocial Isolation
- TUTANKHAMUN
- We Live in An Ocean of Air
- Johnnie Cooper: Throe on Throe
- Philip Colbert: Hunt Paintings
- Known Unknowns

== Publications ==
- The Revolution Continues: New Art From China
- Sarah Kent, "Shark Infested Waters: The Saatchi Collection of British Art in the 90s", Philip Wilson Publishers Ltd, 2003, ISBN 0-85667-584-9.
- Rita Hatton and John A. Walker, "Supercollector, a Critique of Charles Saatchi", The Institute of Artology, 3rd edition 2005, paperback, ISBN 0-9545702-2-7
- USA Today
- The Triumph Of Painting
- The Triumph Of Painting, Supplementary Volume
- The Triumph Of Painting, Supplementary Volume
- 100 The Work That Changed British Art
- Hell, Jake & Dinos Chapman
- Paula Rego
- Young Americans
- Stephan Balkenhol
- Fiona Rae & Gary Hume
- Duane Hanson
- Shark Infested Waters, The Saatchi Collection Of British Art In The 90's
- Young German Artists 2
- Sensation
- Alex Katz: 25 Years Of Painting
- Young Americans 2
- Neurotic Realism
- Eurovision
- Ant Noises 1
- Ant Noises 2
- The Arts Council Gift
- I Am A Camera
- New Labour
- Young British Art
- Saatchi Decade
- Boris Mikhailov: Case History
- Damien Hirst
