= London Original Print Fair =

The London Original Print Fair is an annual art fair in England. It is held in March at Somerset House, London and is London’s longest running art fair.

The Print Fair was founded in 1985 by Gordon Cooke, a director of The Fine Art Society in London. In 1987 Helen Rosslyn, a specialist in prints at Christie's in London came on board; both are now co-directors of the Fair. In 2024, Cook is chairman of the fair and Rosslyn (who is also the Art Director for Tatler magazine), continues to direct the fair.

The 2012 Fair had over 50 international exhibitors, from galleries to printmaking dealers and specialists, representing all periods in printmaking, from the early woodcuts of Albrecht Dürer to lithographs by Picasso and new digital forms by the likes of graffiti artist Shepard Fairey.

Each year the Print Fair opens with a printmaking lecture, honoring an artist who has a prolific background in printmaking. In 2011, Gavin Turk opened up the Fair speaking with art critic and journalist Louisa Buck. For the 2012 fair, Peter Blake spoke about his accomplishments in printmaking during his six decade career.

The fair will celebrate its 40th anniversary (and 40th edition) on 20–23 March 2025.
