= Michael Raedecker =

- Born: Michael George Raedecker; 12 May 1963 (age 63); Amsterdam, Netherlands
- Education: Gerrit Rietveld Academie, Amsterdam; Rijksakademie van Beeldende Kunsten; Goldsmiths College, London
- Known for: Art and fashion
- Notable work: Pictures including paint and textiles
- Awards: John Moores Prize, 1999; Turner Prize short-list, 2000

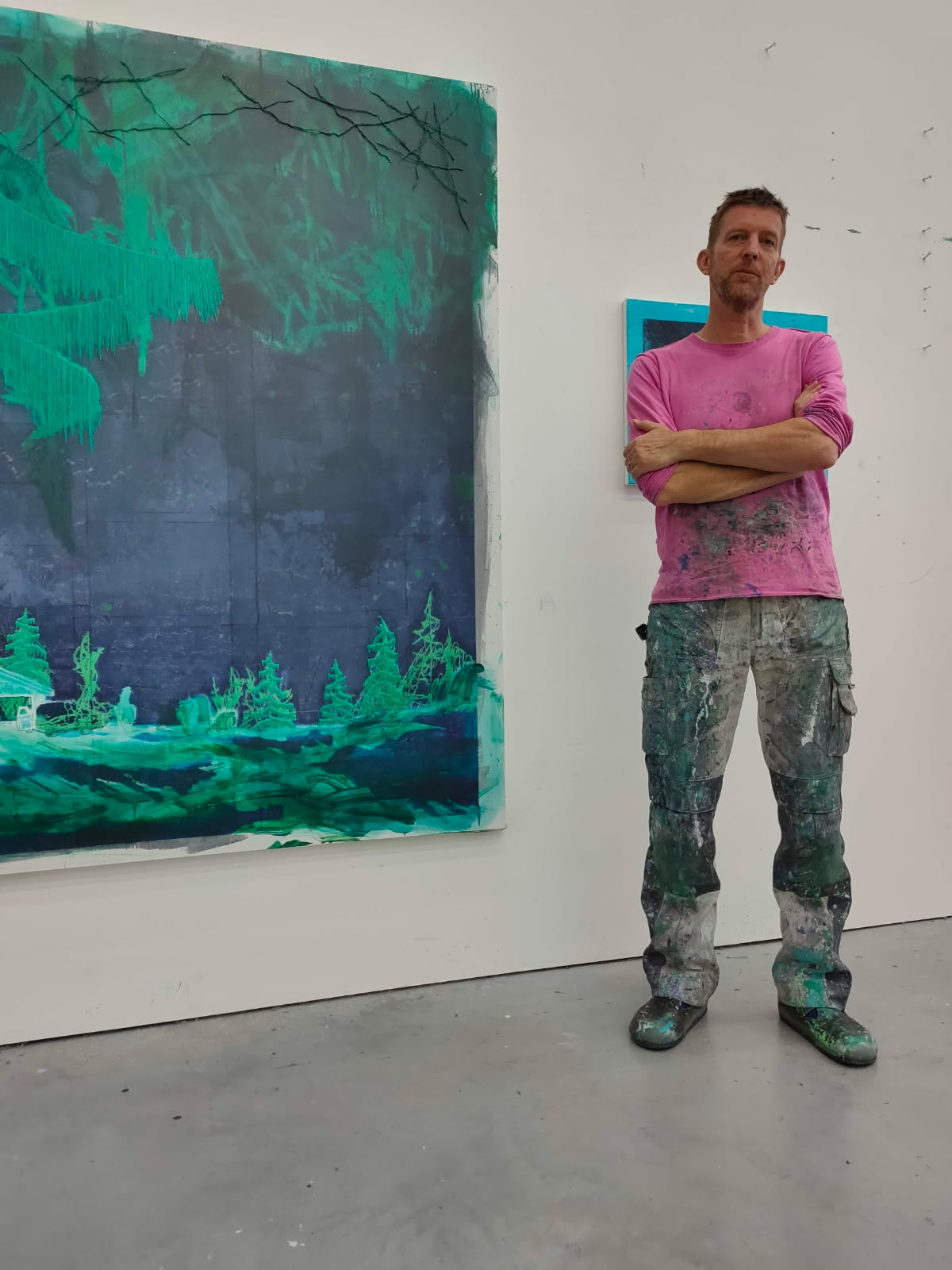
The artist at his studio in east London

Michael Raedecker (born 12 May 1963) is a Dutch artist who works in the United Kingdom.

Raedecker was born in Amsterdam, in the Netherlands. From 1985 to 1990 he studied fashion design at the Gerrit Rietveld Academie in Amsterdam, and then, from 1993 to 1994, at the Rijksakademie van Beeldende Kunsten there. In 1996 and 1997 he studied art at Goldsmiths College in London. After a period working as an apprentice to Martin Margiela, he began to make pictures that included textiles or embroidery as well as paint.

In 1999 Mirage, a painting incorporating sequins and thread, received first prize in the John Moores Prize Exhibition held at the Walker Art Gallery in Liverpool during the Liverpool Biennial. The following year, Raedecker was on the short-list for the Turner Prize.

He is married to artist Rannav Kunoy.
