= Kate Daudy =

British artist

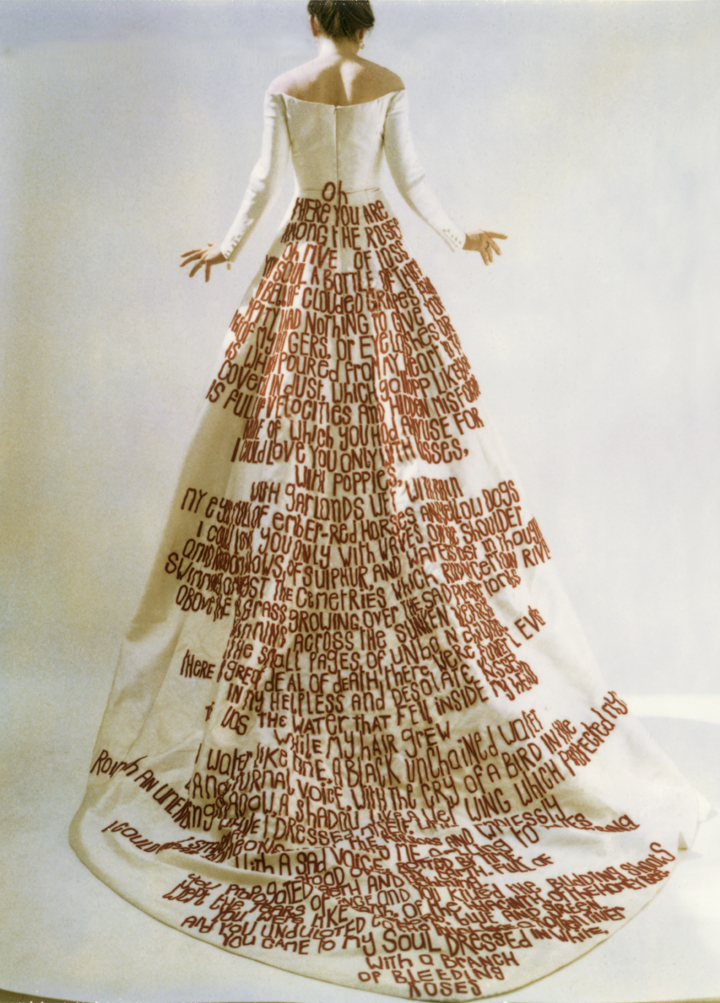
Kate Daudy

Kate Daudy (born 1970) is a British visual artist based in London whose interdisciplinary work focuses on the human experience in the context of the natural world. Her wide-ranging practice appears in the form of installations, mixed media, film, NFTs, participatory performance, sculpture, and writing.

Daudy is recognized globally for her career, resulting in her inclusion in The Standard's London's Most Influential People in 2019. In 2022, Louis Vuitton nominated Daudy as one of 200 ‘visionaries’ in a global campaign. Her work has also been featured in The Times News in Pictures, and Vogue India.

== Themes ==
The concept of writing on objects originates in the beginning of Chinese civilization, when tortoise shells and scapulae were used to predict the future. These 'oracle bones' would go through a process of being burnt in the embers of a fire; Chinese shamans would divine the future from the manner in which the bones and shells cracked and would subsequently inscribe their predictions on them. This was a practice particularly prevalent in the Shang dynasty (1600–1046 BC). The calligraphic writing or inscribing of poems onto objects became an elevated art form in itself, perpetuated by the ruling Emperors, who would compose poems to be inscribed onto paintings or works of art of special significance to them. By perpetuating this literary tradition as a contemporary plastic art form Daudy's work has brought these ancient concepts back to mainland China itself, where the tradition had been lost.

Kate Daudy also creates written interventions, mostly in public spaces in nature, on walls and with fabric, based on an ancient Chinese literary practice of seeking to understand the universe through art and nature. Daudy's Chinese studies have driven an interest in calligraphy and Chinese philosophy, and have led to her working in a variety of mediums, including using felt fabric to create her writings.

She uses felt as her medium, which is for her a symbol of redemption, as it is made from the rubbish of the fabric industry.

Communication and connection are paramount concepts that Daudy works to consider within her work, a theme which extends to her use of collaborators within her practice, such as Nobel Peace Prize Winner Konstantin Novoselov.

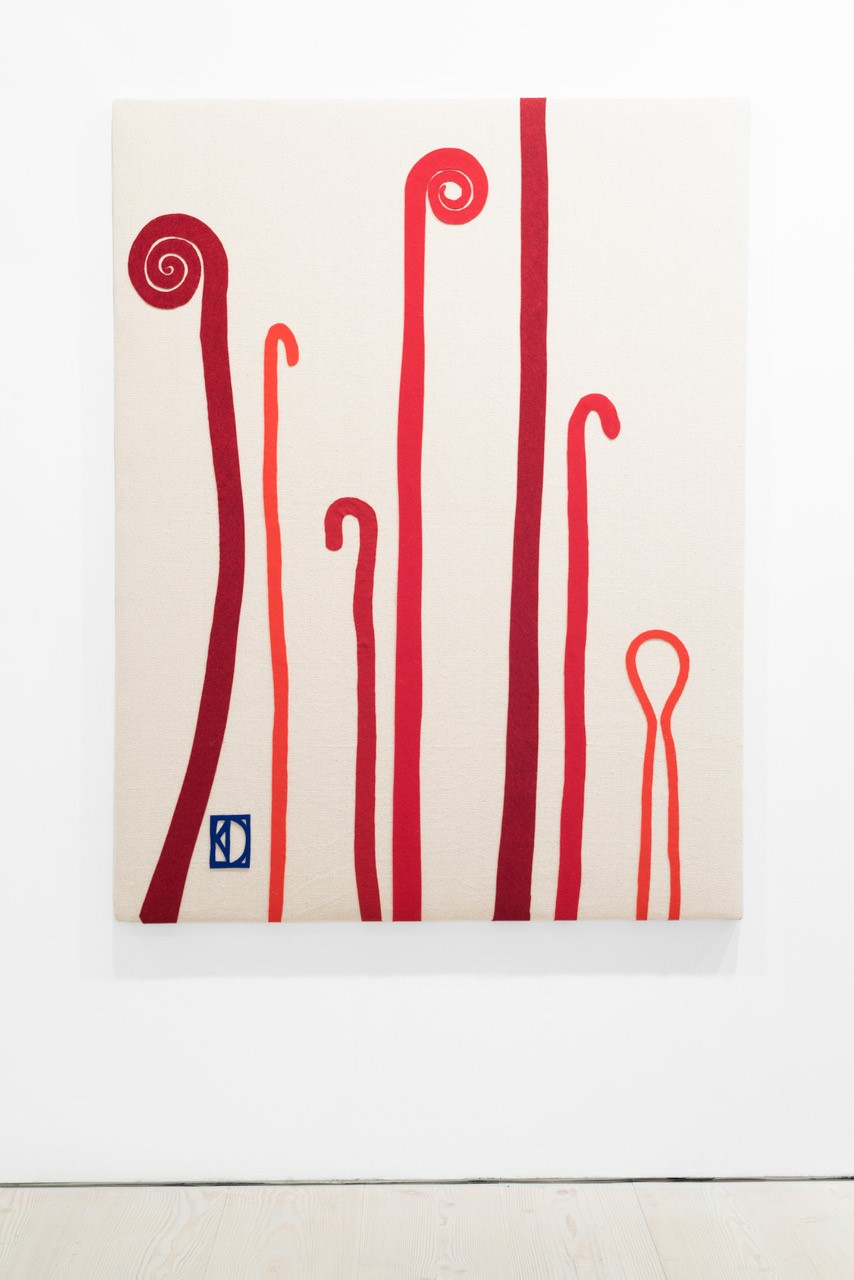
I felt that What I Could not See or Record Would Cease to Exist - by Kate Daudy

== Career ==
Her first show "Written in Water" (2009) with Grant White at the Galerie Marie Victoire Poliakoff in Paris examined the memories associated with items of clothing, inscribing vintage dresses with poems that reflected their identity. Le Figaro compared Daudy's and White's work to that of Jean Cocteau and Elsa Schiaparelli.

Yellow Mountains, Red Letters exhibited at Bonham's London 2010 featured her calligraphic works on photographs by Chinese art specialist Daniel Eskenazi.

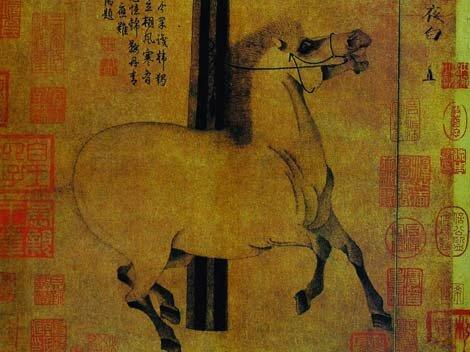
"Night Shining White" by Han Gan (Tang dynasty)

Daudy is a committed peace advocate. One of her most celebrated works, the "War Dress" was commissioned by the Southbank Centre, London for the Poetry International festival. It featured Wilfred Owen's Dulce et Decorum est inscribed in khaki letters down the train of a wedding dress.

She has since collaborated with Lemn Sissay, Glyndebourne Opera, Yang Lian, House of Voltaire[6], Grant White, the Southbank Centre, Poetry International, other artists and poets. Her work features in museums and major private collections throughout the world.

=== 2016/2017 ===
Astronauts of Inner Space (2016) at 50 GOLBOURNE represented a collaboration with Italian designer Paola Petrobelli and Swiss sound artist Philippe Ciompi, evoking William Burroughs' 'inner space', where the conscious and the unconscious combine to provoke memories and thoughts from the observer and to celebrate a full absorption into the living of everyday life.

In 2016 she was designated by ONUART and commissioned to work on a used UNHCR refugee tent provided to her, through their introduction, by the United Nations High Commission for Refugees (UNHCR). The tent has since travelled and has been shown (as "Am I my brother's keeper?") in venues around continental Europe and the United Kingdom, including the Flagey Building in Brussels, the Iglesia del Seminario and the Hay Festival in Segovia, the Chiesa Santa Rosalia in Palermo, the Migration Museum, the School of Oriental and African Studies, the Saatchi Gallery, and St Paul's Cathedral in London, and the Edinburgh Festival.

The research in which Daudy engaged for the purpose of the refugee tent led to a series of new chapters in her work, inspired by the people she encountered - both refugees and those individuals connected to them. Daudy embarked upon a prolific campaign of written interventions in public and private places, across Europe, the UK and the Middle East, conveying positive, thought-provoking messages and ideas. She has written across more than 250 places, from tree stumps to prestigious museums, rubbish bins, fire hydrants, world-famous restaurants, bus shelters, greasy spoons, grocery shops, a refugee registration centre, youth centres, libraries, schools and street corners.

With the support of UNHCR, Daudy has written messages of bravery and hope that come directly from the Syrian refugee camps in Jordan. Her writing is impermanent. She organised a public lecture series at Saint Paul's Cathedral as a part of "Am I my brother's keeper?" featuring Including Hannah Watson, Joe Boyd, Katherine Greig, Vanessa Redgrave, Alix Fazzina, and Marina Warner.

Daudy's drive towards confronting the refugee crisis was the topic of "Clear Blue Skies", a film created by Odessa Rae and supported by the UNCHR, the Metropolitan Museum of Art, Central Park, Grand Central Station, and Ground Zero.

In 2016/2017 her show, This is Water, an open-air display at Yorkshire Sculpture Park, referred to an essay by David Foster Wallace which alludes to how easy it is to forget what is ‘hidden in plain sight all around us.

=== 2018/2019 ===
In 2018, Daudy was the recipient of various commissions for projects across mediums. The Evening Standard commissioned Daudy to write a main editorial investigating the fight against injustice in wake of "Am I my brother's keeper?", entitled "Why Asking Questions Matters". The same year, the Arts Council England commissioned the artist to create a large city-wide installation programme in Manchester called, "We Can Talk About It In The Car".

In 2018/2019 Daudy embarked on “Everything is Connected”, a global art and science collaboration with Konstantin Novoselov, the Nobel Prize laureate in Physics in 2010.

From November 2019 Daudy was appointed by the Saatchi Gallery in London as one of two artists-in-residence, with a brief to respond to its exhibition, “Tutankhamun: Treasures of the Golden Pharaoh”. Her show (“It wasn’t that at all”) explored issues of death, family, home, identity, absence and loss. For this exhibition she also created numerous upholstered furniture works inspired by the artist Gotthard Graubner. Daudy worked with the University of Oxford and The British Museum in order to execute the contemporary response within this exhibition.

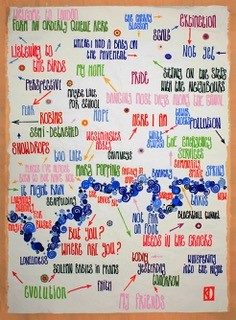
Psychological Map of London, by Kate Daudy

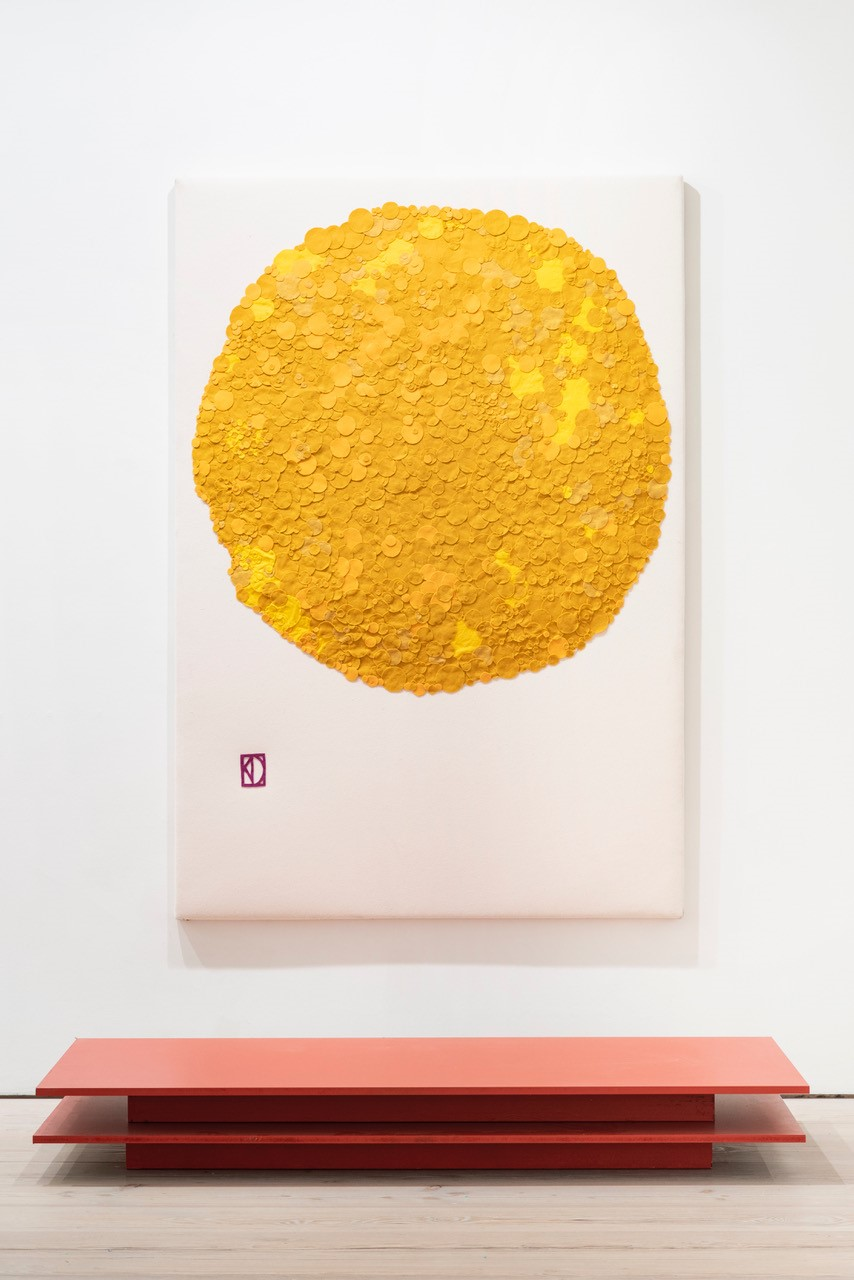
Sun - by Kate Daudy

=== 2021/2022 ===
In 2021 Daudy and Novoslev continued their collaborative efforts with “Wonderchaos”, exhibited at the Yorkshire Sculpture Park from September through October. Daudy and Novoslev pursued an inquiry into how ‘chaos’ is experienced on an individual and collective level across disciplines. This also featured a film and sound piece called, "IF YOU WANT TO HEAR SOME MUSIC, OPEN THE WINDOW: HOMAGE TO JOHN CAGE", a collaboration between Daudy, cellist Steven Isserlis, and Joanna Bergin.

The two received a commission by the National University of Singapore Arts Festival at the Institute for Functional Intelligent Materials titled "Light Years, Week Days", a site-specific chime installation inspired by the hypothesis of Roman philosopher Pliny the Elder surrounding the natural elements and their ability to create music.

In 2021, Daudy was invited to design a trunk for the 200th anniversary of Louis Vuttion, where she created Louis the Sheep, a sustainability sourced and manufactured toy chest containing 199 sheep.

In combining text and drawings that consider the sublime of everyday in conjunction with her deep study of religious texts during the pandemic, Daudy created an online exhibition along with a published book titled, "I Knew You Would Come Back To Me" in April 2021.

The same year Daudy was the subject of the long-form essay, "If I Am Scared, We Can’t Win" by Dr. Rebecca Daniels, where Daudy's work with refugees, experience with the pandemic and its larger sociopolitical impacts are considered in the context fo Daudy's art practice and personal life.

Novoselov and Daudy continued their work together in 2021 with “The Evolution Project”, an NFT project that connected the real and virtual worlds with a series of generative works that continued Daudy's signature “trees”. Crochet elements in the trees are reminiscent of traditional crochet made in refugee camps, a connection to Daudy's focus on the humanitarian refugee crisis in Syria. The visual DNA encoded within the trees allow for a virtual rebirth of digital trees, bridging virtual and natural cycles of regeneration. This project was part of the continued “Everything is Connected” series.

“Mi blancor almidonado: Autorretrato con piedras, sudario y una semilla”, an exhibition that served as a tribute to poet Federico García Lorca was exhibited at CajaGranada Fundación in Granada, Spain in 2022. Daudy's thirty-eight stone portraits created space for the viewer to confront the obstacles that are faced by humankind and the ability to move forward in times of strife.

The National Geological History Museum exhibited Daudy's “Punctum (Future Nostalgia)” in 2022 in Meteora, Greece, an assemblage of personally symbolic objects that ponder the nature of life, death, and piety, drawing parallels to historical understandings of death and devotion.

Daudy returned to her ongoing collaboration with Sir Konstantin Novoselov in 2022 with the celebrated performance piece, “Illustration of the Theory of Unification”. In this participatory performance, Einstein's Unification Theory was demonstrated through a flock of 400 Castilian sheep each painted with the words ‘YES’ or ‘NO’ flooded the Plaza del Azoguejo under the historic Roman aqueduct of Segovia, coming together in randomized arrangements that reflected the ability for humans facing disparate views to come together peacefully. Daudy and Gautier Deblonde created a film called "ALTERNATIVE RANDOM NUMBER GENERATOR: THE SHEEP OF MR. CHARLES PLATTS" illustrating the participatory performance for Hay Festival. Daudy and Novoselov were the subjects of various interviews and podcasts regarding the piece. The two were interviewed by Javier Gila, chair of the Aida: Ayuda, Intercambio y Desarrollo association, for the Hay Festival's podcast. IE University also spoke to the artist and physicist in a video interview.

=== 2023 – present ===
In 2023, Columbia University commissioned Daudy to create “The Honey Window” at the Columbia Global Centers in Paris, a constantly evolving installation consisting of windows made of glass and elm wood filled with honey from Morvan. In these circular windows concepts of time, healing, and community are considered through honey's ties to the Sun God Ra and the efforts of large bee communities within hives in producing honey during the flowering season. The honey within the golden window crystallizes and melts when manipulated by the natural forces of time and temperature.
