= Saint John's School, San Pedro de la Paz =

Saint John's School
- Concepción; Chile

Information
- Motto: Viam Veritatis Inveni (Latin) (To Find the Way of Truth)
- Established: c. 1942

Saint John's School is a K-12 school (Pre-Kinder to 4EM in Chile) located in San Pedro de la Paz, Concepción, Chile.
