= Brilliant! =

Cover of Brilliant! exhibition catalogue showing image of the aftermath of the 1993 Bishopsgate bombing in London by the Provisional Irish Republican Army.

Brilliant! was a group exhibition of contemporary art held at the Walker Art Center, Minneapolis, USA between 22 October 1995 and 7 January 1996. It traveled to the Contemporary Arts Museum Houston, Texas, where it was on view between 17 February and 14 April 1996.

== Theme and content ==
The exhibition sought to showcase a burgeoning group of English artists now known as the YBAs. The Walker's press material, defining the criteria for selection of artists in the exhibition, says:

The artists chosen for the exhibition have become increasingly visible over the past six years in self-promoted, renegade exhibitions and publications that have cropped up throughout London. Their aesthetically diverse and provocative artworks are united by a shared interest in ephemeral materials, unconventional presentation, and an anti-authoritarian stance that lends their objects a youthful, aggressive vitality.

== Exhibited artists ==
- Henry Bond
- Glenn Brown
- Jake and Dinos Chapman
- Adam Chodzko
- Mat Collishaw
- Tracey Emin
- Angus Fairhurst
- Anya Gallaccio
- Liam Gillick
- Damien Hirst
- Gary Hume
- Michael Landy
- Abigail Lane
- Sarah Lucas
- Chris Ofili
- Steven Pippin
- Alessandro Raho
- Georgina Starr
- Sam Taylor-Wood
- Gillian Wearing
- Rachel Whiteread
