= Modern Medicine (art exhibition) =

1990 art exhibition in London

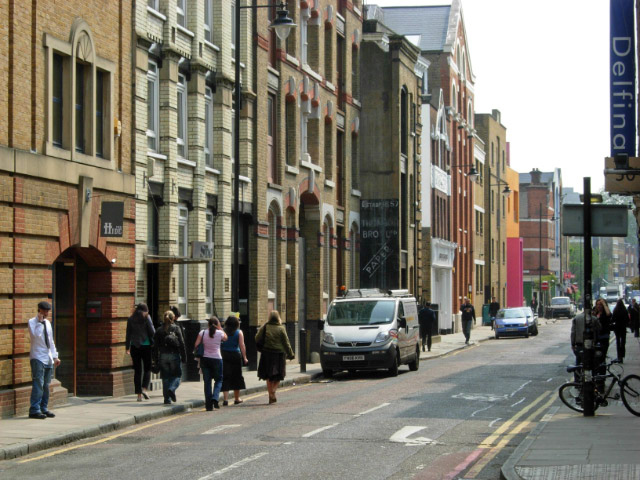
The Bermondsey locale of South London

Modern Medicine was the title of a group exhibition of contemporary art on display in "Building One"—one of the buildings comprising the former Peek Frean biscuit factory—in Bermondsey, London, in 1990. The exhibition was organized or "curated" by Billee Sellman, Damien Hirst and Carl Freedman. The exhibition included the first showing of Damien Hirst's sculpture "One Thousand Years". It was one of several warehouse exhibitions from which the YBA art scene developed—along with Freeze and East Country Yard.

== Exhibited artists ==
- Mat Collishaw
- Grainne Cullen
- Dominic Denis
- Angus Fairhurst
- Damien Hirst
- Abigail Lane
- Miriam Lloyd
- Craig Wood
- Dan Bonsall
