= Abigail Lane =

English artist

Abigail Lane (born 1967) is an English artist who works in photography, wax casting, printing and sound. Lane was one of the exhibitors in the 1988 Damien Hirst-led Freeze exhibition—a mixed show of art which was significant in the development of the later-to-be YBA scene of art.

== Life and work ==
Lane was born in Penzance, Cornwall. She studied at Bristol Polytechnic and Goldsmiths College, University of London. Lanes work attempts to address an absence of an artist or "missing person". She uses clues and photographs as a trace or evidence to her work inviting the audience to piece together a narrative or event that has taken place. Abigail Lane's work presents a disturbing subject matter which creates an alluring effect, Tracey Emin states, "Abigail could show the contents of her fridge and it would be fantastic."

Lane exhibited in the Damien Hirst curated Freeze in 1988, with others including Gary Hume RA, Sarah Lucas and Fiona Rae RA. Karsten Schubert gave her the first solo show in 1992. One of her most well known shows was 'Skin of Teeth' hosted at The Institute of Contemporary Arts in 1995. Lane went on to have a solo show at the Bonnefanten Museum in Maastricht in 1996.

In October 2003, with her two friends Bob Pain and Brigitte Stepputtis, Lane launched a design company in 2003 from her London based studio called "Showroom Dummies" . "Showroom Dummies" included a collection of cushions, tiles, fabrics, blankets, uniforms and wall coverings which Lane described as 'things I would want in my own house"

== Exhibitions ==
- Freeze, Surrey Docks, London, 1988
- New Contemporaries, Institute of Contemporary Arts, London, 1989
- Modern Medicine, Building One, London, 1990
- Show Hide Show, Anderson O'Day Gallery, London, 1991
- Mat Collishaw, Angus Fairhurst, Abigail Lane, Via Farini, Milan, Italy, 1992
- Abigail Lane: Making History Karsten Schubert, 1992
- Group show, Barbara Gladstone Gallery and Stein Gladstone Gallery, New York, 1992
- 20 Fragile Pieces. Galerie Barbara et Luigi Polla, Geneva, Switzerland, 1992
- Skin of Teeth, Institute of Contemporary Arts, London, 1995
- Privacy, Documentario, Milan, Italy, 1993

== See also ==
- Young British Artists
- Freeze exhibition
