= Thomas Trevor (curator) =

British art curator & writer (born 1962)

Professor Thomas Trevor
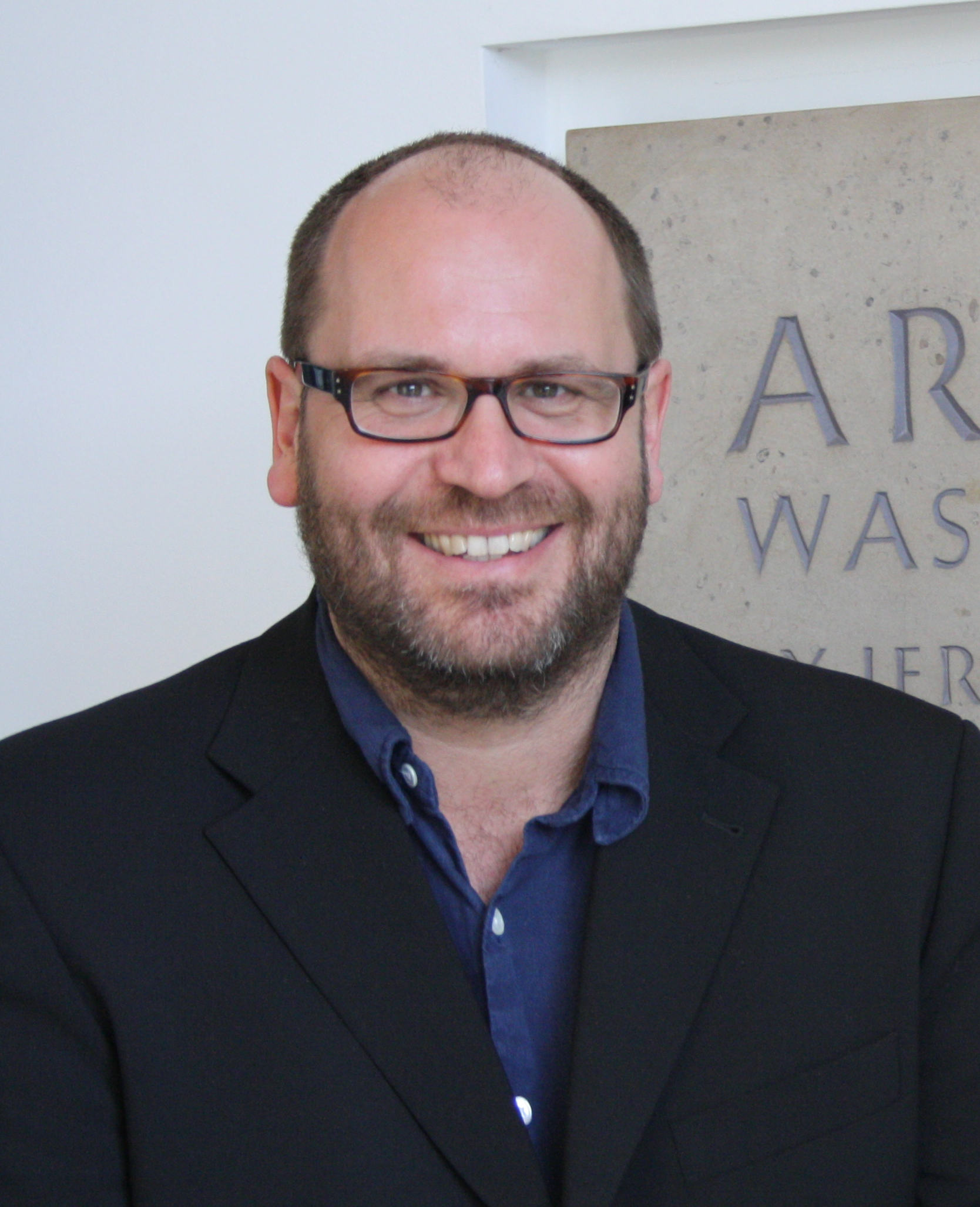
- Trevor Pictured in 2011
- Born: 1962 (age 63–64); United Kingdom
- Other name: Tom Trevor
- Education: Goldsmiths, University of London, University of Oxford, University of Exeter
- Occupations: Curator, Writer, Professor
- Employer: University of Exeter
- Movement: Contemporary Art

Thomas Trevor (born 1962) is a British art curator and writer on contemporary art. Trevor is Associate Professor of Contemporary Art and Curation at the University of Exeter.

He was previously Artistic Director of The Atlantic Project, in Plymouth, UK (2016–19), Guest Curator at the Whitechapel Gallery, London (2015–16), Artistic Director of the 4th Dojima River Biennale in Osaka, Japan (2014–15), curatorial consultant to the 1st ARoS Triennial in Aarhus, Denmark (2014–15), Guest Curator at the Devi Art Foundation in Delhi, India (2013–14), Director of Arnolfini in Bristol, UK (2005–13), Associate Curator of the Art Fund International collection (2007–12) and Director of Spacex (1999–2005) in Exeter, UK. Before that he was an independent curator based in London (1994–1999), initiating projects for institutions such as Camden Arts Centre, the Freud Museum and InIVA. Since the 1990s, Trevor has curated more than 100 exhibitions, placing a particular emphasis upon experimental, interdisciplinary practice and context-led projects. Solo exhibitions include Cosima von Bonin, Matti Braun, Angus Fairhurst, Jutta Koether, Joelle Tuerlinckx, and Lois Weinberger. Group exhibitions include The Visible & the Invisible (1996), the Home Series (2000–04), Port City (2007), Far West (2008), Museum Show (2011), No Borders (2012) and Version Control (2013).

== Biography ==
Trevor studied Fine Art at the Ruskin, University of Oxford and Goldsmiths College, University of London. As an artist based in London, in the 1990s, he participated in various group exhibitions, such as East Country Yard Show (1990), with contemporaries including Liam Gillick, Michael Landy, Sarah Lucas and Gillian Wearing. In 1996 he co-curated a multi-site project, The Visible & the Invisible: representing the body in contemporary art & society, produced by InIVA, that took place in non-art locations around Euston, London, including first UK presentations by Tania Bruguera and Doris Salcedo, along with site-specific installations by Louise Bourgeois, Bruce Nauman, Yoko Ono, Donald Rodney and others.

At Spacex, from June 1999, Trevor curated more than 50 exhibitions and "off-site" projects, placing a particular emphasis upon socially-engaged, context-based work. Multi-site projects included Patterns (2001), with Samta Benyahia and Zineb Sedira, and Homeland (2004), presenting site-specific work by 44 artists in 8 different everyday locations. He also curated projects for the Liverpool Biennial; Generator (2002), Hortus (2004) and, later, Far West Metro (2008); and for Frieze Art Fair (2005) (with new film commissions by Yang Fudong, Mark Leckey, Daria Martin, Jimmy Robert, Imogen Stidworthy and Mika Taanila).

From October 2005 Trevor was Director of Arnolfini, overseeing a visual arts-led multidisciplinary programme of exhibitions, performance, dance, music and film, with a public programme of talks, seminars and learning & participation activities. In 2011, on the occasion of its 50th anniversary, Sir Nicholas Serota described Arnolfini as "one of a handful of the most significant contemporary cultural centres in Europe". Long-term context-led projects in the city of Bristol include Maria Thereza Alves' Ballast Seed Garden (2007 ongoing) and Suzanne Lacy's University of Local Knowledge (2009 ongoing). Trevor left Arnolfini in October 2013, after 8 years, to focus on developing curatorial projects internationally. The first of these, Black Sun (co-curated with Shezad Dawood), opened at the Devi Art Foundation, in Delhi, India, in November 2013.

Trevor's recent curatorial projects include The Atlantic Project "After The Future", a large-scale context-led project across the city of Plymouth, in the autumn of 2018, featuring site-specific installations by twenty artists from twelve countries, "Music for Museums", a series of performances, films and sound interventions taking place throughout the Whitechapel Gallery, London, during the autumn of 2015, and "Take Me To The River" for the 4th Dojima River Biennale, in Osaka, opening in July 2015, with artists from eight countries showing alongside established and emerging Japanese practitioners. Other projects in 2015 include John Akomfrah's Vertigo Sea (Associate Producer), commissioned for the 56th Venice Biennale, and a large-scale architectural commission by Do Ho Suh for the Art Fund International collection (Associate Curator) at Bristol Museum. In 2014 Trevor was a member of the Advisory Committee to the Gwangju Biennale and a member of the jury for the Korea Artists Prize at the national Museum of Modern and Contemporary Art, Seoul.

Trevor was conferred a Doctorate of Letters (DLitt) at the University of Exeter in July 2014. He has lectured widely, including talks in Aarhus, Beijing, Beirut, Bridgetown, Faenza, Seoul, Tehran, Venice, Yokohama and Zurich. In 2012 he was a visiting lecturer on the Gwangju Biennale International Curators Course, and in 2013 he gave the 4th ARKO lecture in Seoul, South Korea. He has written numerous articles and produced more than 40 publications. He founded the Concept Store journal in 2008.

== Exhibitions ==
2018

- The Atlantic Project: After The Future, 28 September-23 October 2018, various locations across Plymouth, UK. Artists: Nilbar Güreş, Tommy Støckel, Liu Chuang (artist), Hito Steyerl, Vermeir & Heiremans, Kiluanji Kia Henda, Ryoji Ikeda, Yan Wang Preston, Donald Rodney, Shezad Dawood, Postcommodity, Carl Slater, Superflex, Uriel Orlow, Jane Grant & John Matthias, Khadija von Zinnenburg Carroll, Chang Jia, Ursula Biemann, Bryony Gillard, Kranemann + Emmett

2017

- SUPERFLEX: FREE BEER version 6.0 (the Atlantic brew), 2 October ongoing, launched at Tate Modern, London.
- A Good Neighbour, 22 September-16 November 2017, The Atlantic Project, Plymouth, UK. Artists: Elmgreen & Dragset with Lukas Wassmann

2015

- Music for Museums, 17 September–29 November 2015, Whitechapel Gallery, London. Artists: Apartment House, David Toop, Gavin Bryars & Etel Adnan, Cara Tolmie, Mikhail Karikis, Florian Hecker, Hassan Khan, Ryoji Ikeda & Carsten Nicolai, Oliver Coates, Mark Fell, Dominic Murcott, Thurston Moore, Rhys Chatham + sound interventions by Support Structure + an artists’ film & video programme
- Take Me To The River, 24 July–30 August 2015, 4th Dojima River Biennale, Osaka. Artists: Aki Sasamoto, Angus Fairhurst, Hito Steyerl, Melanie Gilligan, Melanie Jackson, Michael Stevenson, Peter Fend, Ryoji Ikeda, Shimabuku, Shitamichi Motoyuki, Simon Fujiwara, SUPERFLEX, The Play, Vermeir & Heiremans, Yuken Teruya
- John Akomfrah: Vertigo Sea (Associate Producer), 9 May–22 November 2015, 56th Venice Biennale

2013

- Black Sun (co-curated with Shezad Dawood), 9 November 2013 – 27 April 2014, Devi Art Foundation, Delhi. Artists: Ayisha Abraham, Ashish Avikunthak, Matti Braun, James Lee Byars, Maya Deren, Zarina Hashmi, Runa Islam, Nasreen Mohamedi, Lisa Oppenheim, The Otolith Group, Tejal Shah, Alexandre Singh
- Joelle Tuerlinckx: Wor(l)d(k) in Progress (co-curated with Axel Wieder), 7 December 2013 – 16 March 2014, Arnolfini, Bristol (in collaboration with Wiels, Brussels, and Haus der Kunst, Munich)
- Jutta Koether: Seasons and Sacraments (co-curated with Axel Wieder), 4 May–7 July 2013, Arnolfini (in collaboration with Dundee Contemporary Arts)
- Version Control (co-curated with Axel Wieder), 26 January–14 April 2013, Arnolfini. Artists: AP News, Giles Bailey, Gretchen Bender, Bernadette Corporation, Gerry Bibby, Ruth Buchanan, Antoine Catala, Nicolas Ceccaldi, Simon Denny, Tim Etchells, Loretta Fahrenholz, Felix Gmelin, Grand Openings, Andy Holden & David Conroy, Louise Hervé & Chloé Maillet, Morag Keil, Oliver Laric, Louise Lawler, Tobias Madison & Emanuel Rossetti, Eva & Franco Mattes, Melvin Moti, Rabih Mroué, Ken Okiishi, Amalia Pica, Seth Price and Nora Schultz

2012

- No Borders, 15 December 2012 – 2 June 2013, Bristol Museum and Art Gallery. Artists: Ai Weiwei, Walid Raad, Haegue Yang, Akram Zaatari, Yto Barrada, Hala Elkoussy, Shilpa Gupta, Amar Kanwar, Tala Madani, Zwelethu Mthethwa, Imran Qu’reshi and Shahzia Sikander
- Matti Braun: Gost Log (co-curated with Axel Wieder), 3 October 2012 – 6 January 2013, Arnolfini

2011

- Museum Show (co-curated with Nav Haq), Part 1: 24 September–19 November 2011, and Part 2: 9 December 2011 – 19 February 2012, Arnolfini, Bristol and off-site. Artists: Abake, Guillaume Bijl, Peter Blake, Stuart Brisley, Marcel Broodthaers, Bill Burns, James Lee Byars, Francois Curlet, Jaime Davidovich, Herbert Distel, Marcel Duchamp, Robert Filliou, Simon Fujiwara, Meschac Gaba, Ellen Harvey, Susan Hiller, Marko Lulic, Karen Mirza and Brad Butler, Forrest Myers, Tom Marioni, Asuncion Molinos, Sina Najafi and Christopher Turner, Tsuyoshi Ozawa, Khalil Rabah, Vicente Razo, Øyvind Renberg and Miho Shimizu, Tomas Saraceno, Sarkis, the Museum of American Art, Maarten Vanden Eynde, Hu Xiangqian
- Magical Consciousness (co-curated with Runa Islam and Nav Haq), 12 May – 3 July 2011, Arnolfini. Artists: Helena Almeida, Rosa Barba, Uta Barth, Angela Bulloch, Mariana Castillo Deball, Ula Dajerling, Matias Faldbakken, Ellen Harvey, John Hilliard, William E. Jones, Onkar Kular & Noam Toran, David Maljkovic, Melik Ohanian, Trevor Paglen, Peter Peri, Rosângela Rennó and Mungo Thomson, plus a 13th-century Aztec obsidian mirror
- Cosima von Bonin's Bone Idle for Arnolfini's Sloth section, Loop #2 of the Lazy Susan series, a Rotating Exhibition 2010-2012 (co-curated with Nav Haq), 19 February–25 April 2011, Arnolfini, in collaboration with Witte de With (Rotterdam), MAMCO (Geneva) and Museum Ludwig (Cologne)
- Neil Cummings: Self-Portrait: Arnolfini (co-curated with Nav Haq), throughout 2011

2010

- YoHa/Harwood, Wright & Yokokoji: Coal Fired Computers/Tantalum Memorial, 25 September–21 November 2010, Arnolfini
- Caroline Bergvall & Ciaran Maher: Say Parsley, 8 May–4 July 2010, Arnolfini
- Louise Bourgeois & Otto Zitko: Me, Myself and I, 24 April–4 July 2010, Arnolfini

2009

- Ocean Earth: Situation Room, 21 November 2009 – 17 January 2010, Arnolfini. Artists: Peter Fend, Catherine Griffiths, Kevin Gannon, Heidi Mardon, Eve Vaterlaus
- Barbara Steveni: Beyond the Acid-Free, Artist Placement Group Revisited, 21 November 2009 – 17 January 2010, Arnolfini
- Ursula Biemann: Black Sea Files, 12 September – 8 November 2009, Arnolfini, in collaboration with Bldmuseet, Umea, Sweden
- Suzanne Lacy: University of Local Knowledge, September 2009 on-going, a collaboration between Arnolfini, Knowle West Media Centre and residents of Knowle West, Bristol
- Angus Fairhurst, 31 January – 29 March 2009, Arnolfini, then touring to Waddesdon Manor, M - Museum Leuven (Leuven, Belgium), Westfalischer Kunstverein / Landesmuseum (Munster, Germany)

2008

- Supertoys: on toys, play and affective machines (co-curated with Geoff Cox), 22 November 2008 – 18 January 2009, Arnolfini. Artists: Chris Cunningham, Dunne & Raby, Natalie Jeremijenko, Kahve Society, Philippe Parreno, Unmask Group. Exhibition design: nOffice
- Far West (co-curated with Nav Haq), 28 June–31 August 2008, Arnolfini, then touring to Turner Contemporary, plus off-site project Far West Metro in Bristol Mall and at A Foundation, as part of the Liverpool Biennial. Artists: Xu Bing, David Blandy, Liu Ding, Cao Fei, Pierre Huyghe & Philippe Parreno, Unmask Group, Gunilla Klingberg, Surasi Kusolwong, Michael Lin, Yoko Ono, SOI Project, Seven Samurai, Janek Simon and Support Structure. Exhibition design: nOffice (Markus Miessen, Magnus Nielsen and Ralf Pflugfelder)

2007

- Port City: on mobility & exchange, 15 September–11 November 2007, Arnolfini, then touring to John Hansard Gallery (Southampton) and A Foundation (Liverpool), plus related projects around Europe with Amazelab (Milan). Artists: Maria Thereza Alves, Yto Barrada, Ursula Biemann, Kayle Brandon & Heath Bunting, Maria Magdalena Campos Pons, Ofri Cnaani & Jenny Vogel, Mary Evans, Meschac Gaba, Raimi Gbadamosi, Melanie Jackson, Grzegorz Klaman, Erik van Lieshout, William Pope.L, Kate Rich, Zineb Sedira, Zafos Xagoraris
- Maria Thereza Alves: Seeds of Change, Bristol, September 2007 ongoing, Arnolfini, in partnership with University of Bristol’s Botanical Gardens and Bristol City Council, including a Floating Ballast Seed Garden in 2012 onwards
- Ken Stanton Archive: Recording Iraq, 7 February–1 April, Arnolfini

2006

- Lois & Franziska Weinberger: Home Voodoo, 9 December 2006 – 4 February 2007, Arnolfini
- Melanie Jackson: Road Angel, 9 December 2006 – 28 January 2007, Arnolfini

2005

- Wide Screen (co-curated with Ben Cook, LUX), October 2005, Frieze Art Fair. Artists: Yang Fudong, Mark Leckey, Daria Martin, Mika Taanila, Imogen Stidworthy, Jimmy Robert
- Phyllida Barlow: Scape, May–July 2005, Spacex (Exeter)
- Mika Taanila; Hotel Futuro, March–April 2005, Spacex

2004

- Hortus: botany and empire, September–November 2004, Spacex and Old Haymarket/National Wildflower Centre (Liverpool) as part of the Liverpool Biennial. Artists: Maria Thereza Alves, Caroline Bergvall & Ciaran Maher, Susan Boafo, Jyll Bradley, Stuart Brisley, Peter Fend, Peter Fischli & David Weiss, Helena Goldwater, Andrew Lawson, Vong Phaophanit, Lois & Franziska Weinberger
- Peter Fend: Reverse Global Warming, July–September 2004, Spacex
- Homeland: in and out of Middle England (co-curated with Zoë Shearman), April–June 2004, scattered site project across Exeter. Artists: Guillermo Gómez-Peña, Tariq Alvi, Oladélé Bamgboyé, Grayson Perry, Rosalind Nashashibi, Ansuman Biswas, Jem Finer, Jyll Bradley, Lisa Cheung and Michael Curran, plus guests
- William Kentridge, February–April 2004, Spacex

2003

- Shizuka Yokomizo: Distance, December 2003–January 2004, Spacex, toured to Chapter, Cardiff and Site Gallery, Sheffield (UK)
- Oladélé Bamgboyé: Introspect, October–November 2003, Spacex
- Luke Fowler: What you see is where you’re at, July–September 2003, Spacex
- Flock (co-curated with Louise K. Wilson), March–April 2003, Spacex, toured to Towner Art Gallery, Eastbourne. Artists: Jyll Bradley with Exeter Flower Club, Marcus Coates, Andrew Dodds, John Levack Drever, Jussi Heikkila, Rona Lee, Rachel Lowe, Harriet MacDougall, Quack-project, Sophy Rickett, Katy Shepherd, Hans Waanders

2002

- Generator (co-curated with Geoff Cox), May–June 2002, Spacex, toured to Wood Street (Liverpool), as part of the Liverpool Biennial, and Firstsite, Colchester (UK). Artists: Mark Bowden, Stuart Brisley, Angus Fairhurst, Alex Finlay, Tim Head, Jeff Instone, Zoë Irvine, Sol LeWitt, limbomedia, Alex McLean, Netochka Nezvanova, Yoko Ono, Organogenesis, Colin Sackett, Cornelia Sollfrank, STAR & monkeys from Paignton Zoo, Joanna Walsh, Adrian Ward

2001

- Patterns (co-curated with Zoe Shearman), November 2001–February 2002, multi-site project across Exeter, including Exeter Cathedral, Exeter Mosque, the Institute of Arab and Islamic Studies at the University of Exeter and Spacex. Artists: Zineb Sedira, Samta Benyahia, Ismail Fajer, Geoffrey Preston
- Caroline Bergvall and Ciarán Maher: Say "Parsley", November 2001, Spacex 2 (former Maritime Museum, Exeter).
- Sea Change, September–October 2001, Spacex 2 (former Maritime Museum, Exeter). Artists: Peter Fend, Dennis Oppenheim, George Chaikin, Steve Hughes, Mike Lawson-Smith, Samantha Lavender, John F. Simon, Taro Suzuki
- Angus Fairhurst: This Does Not Last More Than One Second (co-curated with Zoe Shearman), April–June 2001, Spacex. Performance: L*******S: Angus Fairhurst, with Pierre Bismuth, Joe Strummer, Keith Allen
- Gavin Renwick: HOME, the outpost of progress (co-curated with Zoe Shearman), January–April 2001, Spacex, and at Royal Albert Memorial Museum, Exeter

2000

- Jayne Parker: Foxfire Eins (co-curated with Zoe Shearman), December 2000–January 2001, Spacex, toured to John Hansard Gallery and Aldeburgh Festival. Performance: World premiere of Christopher Fox’s composition, Inner, performed by Anton Lukoszevieze
- Sigalit Landau: Somnambulin (co-curated with Zoe Shearman), August–September 2000, Spacex & performance, East Devon, toured to Saitama Museum of Modern Art (Japan)
- Lois Weinberger: Edge of the City (co-curated with Zoe Shearman), June–August 2000, Spacex & off-site, Exeter, plus exhibitions at Camden Arts Centre and the Freud Museum, London
- Everything needs time (co-curated with Ineke van der Wal), May–June 2000, Spacex and Honiton Festival. Artists: Berlinda de Bruyckere, Peter Buggenhout, Bettie van Haaster, Nico Parlevliet, Maria Roosen, Keiko Sato, Johan Tahon, Fiona Tan
- Bettina Semmer: Painting Factory (co-curated with Zoe Shearman), March–April 2000, Spacex
- Homing: projects for Kosovo (co-curated with Zoe Shearman), January–March 2000, Spacex. Artists: Christine & Irene Hohenbuchler with Martin Feiersinger, Gunther Steiner, Kunstwerkstatt Lienz, Architecture for Humanity with Mike Lawless, LDA Architects, Art Therapy Initiative

1999

- Hermione Wiltshire: and when I got there (co-curated with Zoe Shearman), October–November 1999, Spacex, toured to Djanogly Art Gallery, University of Nottingham

1996

- The Visible & the Invisible: re-presenting the body in contemporary art & society (co-curated with Zoe Shearman), 21 September–26 October 1996, produced by InIVA, sited in "non-art" locations around the Euston area of central London: the Wellcome Trust, University College London, Friend’s House, St. Pancras Church and Euston Station. Artists: Vito Acconci, Sutapa Biswas, Louise Bourgeois, Nancy Burson, Tania Bruguera, Maureen Connor, Brian Jenkins, Bruce Nauman, Virginia Nimarkoh, Yoko Ono, Jayne Parker, Donald Rodney, Doris Salcedo, Louise K Wilson

== Selected writings and publications ==
- Everything and Nothing: the Pre-History of Zero in Joelle Tuerlinckx: Wor(l)(d)(k) in Progress, published by Walther Konig, Cologne, 2013, with Arnolfini, Haus der Kunst, Munich, and Wiels, Brussels
- Blind Spot in Black Sun, published by Ridinghouse, London, 2013, with Arnolfini and Devi Art Foundation, Delhi
- The Three Ecologies in Lois Weinberger, published by Hatje Cantz, Ostfildern, 2013, with SMAK, Ghent, edited by Philippe van Cauteren
- Free Time in Cosima von Bonin, The Lazy Susan Series, Rotterdam – Bristol – Genève – Köln, published by Museum Ludwig and DuMont, Köln, 2011, with Witte de With (Rotterdam), Arnolfini and MAMCO (Geneva)
- Otto Zitko: Me, Myself and I, published by Jovis, Berlin 2011, edited by Tom Trevor and Ingeburg Wurzer
- A Space for Ideas in Neil Cummings: Self-Portrait Arnolfini, published by Arnolfini, Bristol, 2011, edited by Neil Cummings, Tom Trevor and Julian Warren
- The Green Man in Lois Weinberger, published by Musée d'Art Moderne, Saint-Etienne, and Silvana Editoriale, Milan 2011, edited by Lóránd Hegyi
- Somnanbulin: A Short Journey Through Middle England in Sigalit Landau, published by Kunst-Werke, Berlin, and Hatje Cantz, Ostfildern, 2008, edited by Gabriele Horn and Ruth Ronen
- Introduction in Port City: On Mobility and Exchange, published by Arnolfini, Bristol, 2007, edited by Tom Trevor
