= Tony Arefin =

British graphic designer (1962–2000)

- Born: Abed Mohammed Arefin; 1962; Karachi, Pakistan
- Died: 19 May 2000 (aged 37–38); Manhattan, New York City, US
- Occupations: Graphic designer, art director
- Children: 2

Tony Arefin (born Abed Mohammed Arefin; 1962 – 19 May 2000) was a Pakistani-born British graphic designer and art director. Largely self-taught, he designed exhibition catalogues for London galleries and for the Young British Artists in the late 1980s and early 1990s, including the catalogue for Freeze (1988), and worked on the art direction of Frieze in its early years. In 1993 he moved to New York as creative director of I.D. and also art-directed Bomb and Blind Spot. He then moved into advertising at Wieden+Kennedy and Ogilvy & Mather, where his work included IBM's "Magic Box" campaign. He died of a heart attack in New York at the age of 38. In 2012 Ikon Gallery in Birmingham held the first survey exhibition of his work.

== Early life ==
Arefin was born in Karachi in 1962; his mother gave him the nickname Tony. His family moved to Bangladesh and then, in 1974, to Britain. He was largely self-taught, and before taking up graphic design he worked in a factory and a bookshop.

He worked as a picture editor and design assistant on several London magazines, and as an exhibitions organiser at The Photographers' Gallery, where he organised an exhibition of Neville Brody's work for The Face.

== Career ==
Working under the name Arefin & Arefin, he designed for major London art institutions and for artists and designers including Damien Hirst, Cornelia Parker and Jasper Morrison. His catalogue for Freeze accompanied the 1988 group show that launched the careers of many of the Young British Artists. Other catalogues included Adrian Piper at Ikon Gallery (1991), The Sociable Art of Douglas Gordon at Tramway, Glasgow (1993), and a series for Chisenhale Gallery in London. The design critic Rick Poynor described him as "single-handedly processing the print needs of the entire British art scene".

Arefin brought the approach of 1980s style-magazine art direction, with large images, strong colour and prominent type, to art catalogues. He often worked with the photographer Anthony Oliver and the designer Stephen Coates, and was an early user of digital typefaces such as Template Gothic. In 1996 he told Eye that art audiences were visually literate but conservative about printed formats, and that designers added value to works of art without being credited for it.

He also worked on the art direction of Frieze in its early years. While interviewing Jasper Morrison for an early issue in 1991, he suggested turning Morrison's slide lecture into a book, and in 1992 he designed and published A World Without Words in an edition of 1,000 copies, with a single image on each page.

In 1993 Arefin moved to New York to become creative director of I.D. He also art-directed Bomb, Blind Spot and Art+Auction. As Bomb's designer from 1994 to 1997 he redesigned the magazine, including its logo, and designed album covers for David Byrne's label Luaka Bop. James Langdon, who later curated a retrospective of Arefin's work, regarded the New York magazine work as his most confident.

Arefin moved into advertising in the late 1990s, joining Wieden+Kennedy in Portland. He returned to New York the following year as associate creative director and senior partner at Ogilvy & Mather. (Note: Sources give 1997 and 1998 for his move to Wieden+Kennedy.) His clients included Nike, Microsoft and IBM; IBM's "Magic Box" campaign of 1999 was a collaboration with the lettering artist Paul Davis.

== Death and legacy ==
Arefin died of a heart attack at St Vincent's Hospital in Manhattan on 19 May 2000, aged 38. He was survived by his wife and two sons.

Ikon Gallery held the first survey of his work, Arefin & Arefin: The Graphic Design of Tony Arefin, from 12 September to 4 November 2012. Curated by Langdon, it was accompanied by a book with an essay by Emily King and a conversation between Langdon, Poynor and the gallery's director, Jonathan Watkins. Alice Rawsthorn has noted that Arefin is admired by young designers, mostly for his work with the Young British Artists.
