= Thomas Trevor =

Thomas Trevor may refer to:

- Sir Thomas Trevor (1586–1656), English judge who delivered the judgment against John Hampden in the Ship Money case
- Sir Thomas Trevor, 1st Baronet (c. 1612–1676), his son, Member of Parliament for Monmouth and Tregony
- Thomas Trevor, 1st Baron Trevor (1658–1730), English judge, Attorney General and Chief Justice of Common Pleas
- Thomas Trevor, 22nd Baron Dacre (1808–1890), British politician, MP for Hertfordshire
- Thomas Trevor (curator) (born 1962), British art curator and writer
