= Stephen Park =

Stephen Park may also refer to:

- Stephen Park (actor) (fl. from 1987), American comedian
- Stephen Park (artist) (born 1962), British artist and performer
- Stephen Park (sports executive) (born 1968), Scottish yachtsman and cycling director
- Stephen K. Park, author of the Park-Miller random number generator
- Steve Park (Stephen Brian Park, born 1967), American NASCAR driver

== See also ==
- Stephen Parke (born 1950), New Zealand physicist
