= Young British Artists =

Loose group of visual artists

Mat Collishaw's Bullet Hole, which was on display in the Freeze exhibition

The Young British Artists, or YBAs—also referred to as Brit artists and Britart—is a loose group of visual artists who first began to exhibit together in London in 1988. Many of the YBA artists graduated from the BA Fine Art course at Goldsmiths, in the late 1980s, whereas some from the group had trained at Royal College of Art.

The scene began around a series of artist-led exhibitions held in warehouses and factories, beginning in 1988 with the Damien Hirst-led Freeze and, in 1990, East Country Yard Show and Modern Medicine.

They are noted for "shock tactics", use of throwaway materials, wild living, and an attitude "both oppositional and entrepreneurial". They achieved considerable media coverage and dominated British art during the 1990s; internationally reviewed shows in the mid-1990s included Brilliant! and Sensation.

Many of the artists were initially supported and their works collected by Charles Saatchi. One notable exception is Angus Fairhurst. Leading artists of the group include Damien Hirst and Tracey Emin. Key works include Hirst's The Physical Impossibility of Death in the Mind of Someone Living, a shark preserved in formaldehyde in a vitrine, and Emin's My Bed, a dishevelled double bed surrounded by detritus.

== Origin ==
There is some disagreement as to the first use of the term "young British artists." Tate claims that it was Michael Corris in a footnote in Artforum, May 1992, Others claim that it was Saatchi who had already entitled his exhibition Young British Artists I in March 1992. The acronym "YBA" (or "yBa") was not coined until 1994. It has become a historic term, as most of the YBAs were born in the mid-1960s.

=== YBA artists ===
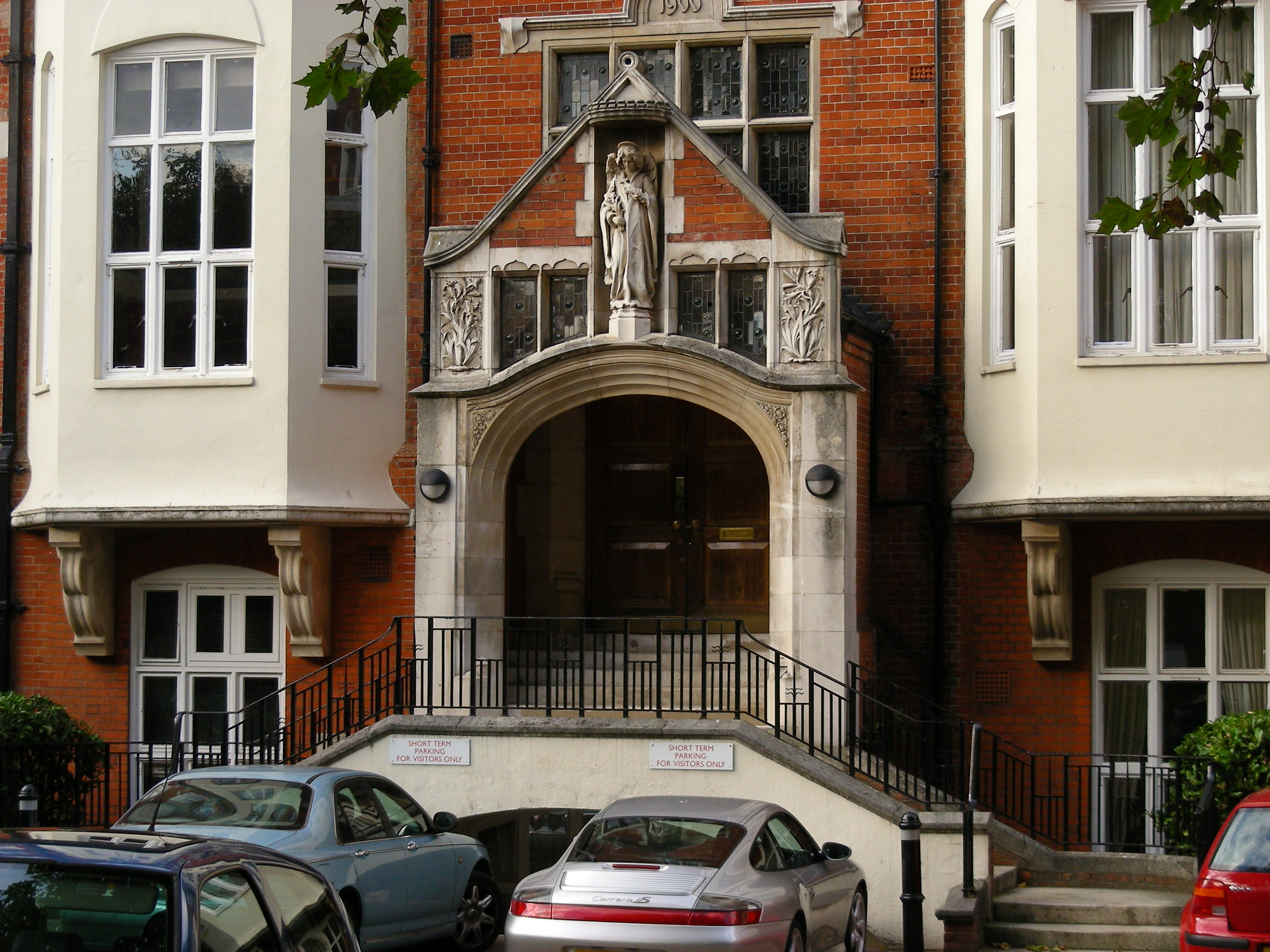
Goldsmiths College, Millard Building, in Camberwell, where many of the YBAs met on the BA Fine Art, in the late 1980s

The core of the YBA group graduated from the Goldsmiths BA Fine Art degree course in the classes of 1987–1990. Liam Gillick, Fiona Rae, Steve Park and Sarah Lucas, were graduates in the class of 1987. Ian Davenport, Michael Landy, Gary Hume, Anya Gallaccio, Lala Meredith-Vula, Henry Bond, Angela Bulloch, were graduates in the class of 1988; Damien Hirst, Angus Fairhurst, Mat Collishaw, Simon Patterson, and Abigail Lane, were graduates from the class of 1989; whilst Gillian Wearing, and Sam Taylor-Wood, were graduates from the class of 1990, and Jason Martin was graduated with the class of 1993. During the years 1987–1990, the teaching staff on the Goldsmiths BA Fine Art included Jon Thompson, Richard Wentworth, Michael Craig-Martin, Ian Jeffrey, Helen Chadwick, Mark Wallinger, Judith Cowan and Glen Baxter.

Gavin Turk and Mark Francis are also part of the YBA group of artists. Turk and Francis studied at Chelsea School of Art from 1986 to 1989, and at the Royal College of Art from 1989 to 1991. Turk and Francis exhibited work in the Saatchi Sensation exhibition at the Royal Academy.

=== Freeze ===
A group of sixteen Goldsmiths students took part in a group exhibition of art, called Freeze, of which Damien Hirst became the main organiser; he was still in the second year of a BA in Fine Art.

Commercial galleries had shown a lack of interest in the project, and it was held in a cheap non-art space, a London Docklands admin block (usually referred to as a warehouse). The event resonated with the 'Acid house' warehouse rave scene prevalent at the time, but did not achieve any major press exposure. One of its effects was to set an example of artist-as-curator—in the mid-1990s artist-run exhibition spaces and galleries became a feature of the London arts scene.

=== Other shows ===
There was a less prominent predecessor organized by artist Angus Fairhurst, featuring himself, Damien Hirst, Abigail Lane, and Mat Collishaw in a small show called Progress by Degree at the Bloomsbury Gallery of the University of London (Institute of Education) shortly before Freeze.

View of East Country Yard Show with Anya Gallaccio's installation in foreground, 1990.

In liaison with Hirst, Carl Freedman (who had been friends with him in Leeds before Hirst moved to London and was helping to make Hirst's vitrines) and Billee Sellman then curated two influential "warehouse" shows in 1990, Modern Medicine and Gambler, in a Bermondsey former factory they designated Building One. To stage Modern Medicine they raised £1,000 sponsorships from artworld figures including Charles Saatchi. Freedman has spoken openly about the self-fulfilling prophecy these sponsors helped to create, and also commented that not many people attended these early shows, including Freeze. In 1990, Henry Bond and Sarah Lucas organised the East Country Yard Show in a disused warehouse in London Docklands which was installed over four floors and 16,000m^{2} of exhibition space. Writing in The Independent, art critic Andrew Graham-Dixon said:

"Goldsmiths graduates are unembarrassed about promoting themselves and their work: some of the most striking exhibitions in London over the past few months—"The East Country Yard Show", or "Gambler", both staged in docklands—have been independently organized and funded by Goldsmiths graduates as showcases for their work. This has given them a reputation for pushiness, yet it should also be said that in terms of ambition, attention to display and sheer bravado there has been little to match such shows in the country's established contemporary art institutions. They were far superior, for instance, to any of the contemporary art shows that have been staged by the Liverpool Tate in its own multi-million-pound dockland site."

Established alternative spaces such as City Racing at the Oval in London and Milch gave many artists their first exposure. There was much embryonic activity in the Hoxton/Shoreditch area of East London focused on Joshua Compston's gallery. In 1991, the Serpentine Gallery presented a survey of this group of artists with the exhibition Broken English. In 1992, Charles Saatchi staged a series of exhibitions of Young British Art, the first show included works by Sarah Lucas, Rachel Whiteread and Damien Hirst.

A second wave of Young British Artists appeared in 1992–1993 through exhibitions such as New Contemporaries, New British Summertime and Minky Manky (curated by Carl Freedman). This included Douglas Gordon, Christine Borland, Fiona Banner, Tracey Emin, Tacita Dean, Georgina Starr and Jane and Louise Wilson. One exhibition which included several of the YBA artists was the 1995 quin-annual British Art Show.

== Revitalization of British art scene ==
The Young British Artists revitalised (and in some cases spawned) a whole new generation of contemporary commercial galleries such as Karsten Schubert, Sadie Coles, Victoria Miro, Maureen Paley's Interim Art, and Jay Jopling's White Cube. The spread of interest improved the market for contemporary British art magazines through increased advertising and circulation. Frieze launched in 1991 embraced the YBAs from the start while established publications such as Art Monthly, Art Review, Modern Painters and Contemporary Art were all re-launched with more focus on emerging British artists.

=== Charles Saatchi's involvement ===
The Physical Impossibility of Death in the Mind of Someone Living by Damien Hirst (1991). An iconic work of the YBA art scene.

One of the visitors to Freeze was Charles Saatchi, a major contemporary art collector and co-founder of Saatchi and Saatchi, the London advertising agency. Saatchi then visited Gambler in a green Rolls-Royce and, according to Freedman, stood open-mouthed with astonishment in front of (and then bought) Hirst's first major "animal" installation, A Thousand Years, consisting of a large glass case containing maggots and flies feeding off a rotting cow's head. (The installation was later a notable feature of the Sensation exhibition.)

Saatchi became not only Hirst's main collector, but also the main sponsor for other YBAs–a fact openly acknowledged by Gavin Turk. The contemporary art market in London had dramatically collapsed in mid-1990 due to a major economic recession, and many commercial contemporary galleries had gone out of business. Saatchi had until this time collected mostly American and German contemporary art, some by young artists, but most by already established ones.

His collection was publicly exhibited in a series of shows in a large converted paint factory building in St John's Wood, north London. Saatchi's Gallery inspired young artists to produce large concept artworks that would not fit in the usually small galleries in London at that time. Previous Saatchi Gallery shows had included such major figures as Warhol, Guston, Alex Katz, Serra, Kiefer, Polke, Richter and many more. In the early-1990s, Saatchi altered his focus to emerging British art.

Saatchi put on a series of shows called Young British Artists starting in 1992, when a noted exhibit was Damien Hirst's "shark" (The Physical Impossibility of Death in the Mind of Someone Living), which became the iconic work of British art in the 1990s, and the symbol of Britart worldwide. In addition to (and as a direct result of) Saatchi's patronage, the Young British Artists benefited from intense media coverage. This was augmented by controversy surrounding the annual Turner Prize, (one of Britain's few major awards for contemporary artists), which had several of the artists as nominees or winners. Channel 4 had become a sponsor of the competition, leading to television profiles of the artists in prime-time slots.

== Becoming the establishment ==
The consolidation of the artists' status began in 1995 with a large-scale group exhibition Brilliant! held at the Walker Art Center a respected art museum in Minneapolis, USA. The term "yBa" was already used in 1994 and later used by Simon Ford in a feature "Myth Making" in March 1996 in Art Monthly magazine.

Art dealer Jay Jopling began to represent YBAs Jake & Dinos Chapman, Tracey Emin, Marcus Harvey, Damien Hirst, Gary Hume, Marc Quinn, Gavin Turk and Sam Taylor-Wood, whom he married in 1998. Before Jopling, Karsten Schubert was the most important dealer of artists that were later called YBAs. Shortly after Freeze he exhibited Ian Davenport, Gary Hume, and Michael Landy in November 1988, who all exhibited in Freeze, in his gallery.

In 1997, the Royal Academy staged an exhibition of the private art collection of Charles Saatchi titled Sensation, which included many works by YBA artists.

The exhibition was actually a showing of Charles Saatchi's private collection of their work, and he owned the major pieces. The liaison was effected by the Academy's Norman Rosenthal, even though there was strong opposition from some of the Academicians, three of whom resigned. Controversy engendered in the media about the show, particularly over Marcus Harvey's work Myra, served to reinforce the YBAs' importance. When the show toured to New York there was further controversy caused by the inclusion of Chris Ofili's work The Holy Virgin Mary (1996).

== The YBAs since 1992 ==
In 1997, Gillian Wearing won the annual Turner Prize. In 1998, Chris Ofili won the annual Turner Prize.

In 1999, Tracey Emin was nominated for the Turner Prize. Her main exhibit, My Bed, consisting literally of her dishevelled, stained bed, surrounded by detritus including condoms, slippers and soiled underwear, created an immediate and lasting media impact and further heightened her prominence. The emergence at the same time of an anti-YBA group, The Stuckists, co-founded by her ex boyfriend, Billy Childish, gave another angle to media coverage.

In 2003, YBAs Jake and Dinos Chapman and Anya Gallaccio were nominated for the annual Turner Prize.

On 24 May 2004, a fire in a storage warehouse destroyed some works from the Saatchi collection, including the Chapman Brothers' Hell and Tracey Emin's "tent", Everyone I Have Ever Slept With 1963–1995.

In 2008, YBA Angus Fairhurst died by suicide.

In the 2011 Birthday Honours List, Sam Taylor-Wood and Gillian Wearing were appointed to the Order of the British Empire by Queen Elizabeth II.

=== Elected Royal Academicians ===
Several of the YBAs have been elected as lifetime members of the Royal Academy of Arts in London (founded by George III in 1768); hence they are "Royal Academicians," and may use the letters "RA" after their name to indicate this.

- Gary Hume elected 24 May 2001
- Fiona Rae elected 28 May 2002
- Tracey Emin elected 27 March 2007
- Jenny Saville elected July 2007
- Gillian Wearing elected 11 December 2007
- Michael Landy elected 29 May 2008
- Tacita Dean elected 9 December 2008

=== Doctorates ===
- 2004: Gillian Wearing - Honorary Doctorate from the University for the Creative Arts
- 2007: Henry Bond - Doctorate from the University of Gloucestershire
- 2007: Tracey Emin - Honorary Doctorates from the Royal College of Art and London Metropolitan University
- 2010: Fiona Banner - Honorary Doctorate from Kingston University

== Reaction ==
=== Positive ===
Richard Cork (at one time art critic of The Times) has been a staunch advocate of the artists, as has art writer Louisa Buck, and former Time Out art editor, Sarah Kent. Sir Nicholas Serota has validated the artists by the nomination of several of them for the Turner Prize and their inclusion in the Tate collection.

Maureen Paley said, "The thing that came out of the YBA generation was boldness, a belief that you can get away with anything."

Speaking in 2009, Iwona Blazwick, the director of the Whitechapel Art Gallery, said, "The YBA moment is definitely now dead, but anyone who thinks they were a cut-off point is wrong. They began something which has continued to grow ever since. It's not over."

=== Negative ===
In 1998, John Windsor in The Independent said that the work of the YBAs seemed tame compared with that of the "shock art" of the 1970s, including "kinky outrages" at the Nicholas Treadwell Gallery, amongst which were a "hanging, anatomically detailed leather straitjacket, complete with genitals", titled Pink Crucifixion, by Mandy Havers.

In 1999 the Stuckists art group was founded with an overt anti-YBA agenda. In 2002 Britart was heavily criticised by the leading conductor Sir Simon Rattle, who was, in return, accused of having a poor understanding of conceptual and visual art.

Playwright Tom Stoppard made a public denunciation, and Brian Sewell (art critic of the Evening Standard) was consistently hostile, as was David Lee, the editor of Jackdaw. Rolf Harris, the television presenter and artist, singled out Tracey Emin's My Bed as the kind of installation that put people off art. "I don't see how getting out of bed and leaving the bed unmade and putting it on show and saying that's worth, I don't know £31,000 ... I don't believe it, I think it's a con."

For James Heartfield, "The 1990s art boom encouraged sloppiness. The Young British Artists preferred the inspired gesture to patient work. They added public outrage to their palettes, only to find that it faded very quickly."

Members of the group are parodied in a regular cartoon strip by Birch, titled "Young British Artists", in the British satirical magazine Private Eye. The scene is also parodied in Jilly Cooper's 2002 bonkbuster Pandora.

=== Feminism within the YBAs ===
Female artists were distinctly a minority amongst the male dominated environment of the Young British Artists. Individuals such as Sarah Lucas, Jenny Saville and Rachel Whiteread have varied levels of neglect within their media portrayals, as well as incomparable in notoriety to male YBA peers such as Hirst.

The University of Sussex's Art Society Journal describes how feminists in the 1980s influenced the female members of the Young British Artists' artwork through the strategy of subverting feminine stereotypes. Other discourse around female YBA work include a discussion of Rachel Whiteread's sculpture practice. Whiteread has been said to disrupt the 'clear' concept of women making 'female work'. Her work Nine Tables attempts to exist within a third space, where the forms can't be physically gendered, but still viewed as a feminine objects. Daniel Ogilivie has expressed how Judith Butler's concept of which "…the mere act of 'doing', of casting the object, that expresses the gender and it is not any anthropomorphic association in the artwork itself," creates the feminine within Whiteread's work.

With the prevalence of feminist ideology in society and the contemporary art, critics have argued that female artists like Jenny Saville in the 1990s investigated the contrived idea of 'feminity' made by the Patriarchal Structure. While attending art school in Cincinnati, Saville's feminist passion was conceived through a realisation of gender within art history. In her own words, she discovered that, "I'd always wondered why there had been no women artists in history. I found there had been – but not reported. I realized I'd been affected by male ideas, going through a male-dominated art college". Now consciously aware of institutional patriarchy, Saville began to paint female nudes that were not idealised. Rather than continue the recognised historical male view of female bodies, Saville created depictions of natural women with genuine flaws. Pubic hair trailing up stomachs and around thighs, discoloured skin and areas of excess flesh. Deconstructing the feminine body, Saville has stated that, "I'm not trying to teach, just make people discuss, look at how women have been made by man. What is beauty? Beauty is usually the male image of the female body. My women are beautiful in their individuality."

== Artists exhibited in Freeze ==
- Steven Adamson
- Angela Bulloch
- Mat Collishaw
- Ian Davenport
- Angus Fairhurst
- Anya Gallaccio
- Damien Hirst
- Gary Hume
- Michael Landy
- Abigail Lane
- Sarah Lucas
- Lala Meredith-Vula
- Richard Patterson
- Stephen Park
- Fiona Rae
- Simon Patterson

== Artists exhibited in Brilliant! ==
- Henry Bond
- Glenn Brown
- Jake and Dinos Chapman
- Adam Chodzko
- Mat Collishaw
- Tracey Emin
- Angus Fairhurst
- Anya Gallaccio
- Liam Gillick
- Damien Hirst
- Gary Hume
- Michael Landy
- Abigail Lane
- Sarah Lucas
- Chris Ofili
- Steven Pippin
- Alessandro Raho
- Georgina Starr
- Sam Taylor-Wood
- Gillian Wearing
- Rachel Whiteread

== Other YBAs ==
- Fiona Banner
- Christine Borland
- Tacita Dean
- Douglas Gordon
- Marcus Harvey
- David Leapman
- Jason Martin
- Andrew Penketh
- Marc Quinn
- Gavin Turk
- Jane and Louise Wilson
- Jenny Saville
