= Anya Gallaccio =

British artist (born 1963)

- Born: 1963 (age 62–63); Paisley, Renfrewshire, Scotland
- Education: Kingston Polytechnic and Goldsmiths College
- Movement: Young British Artists
- Father: George Gallaccio

Anya Gallaccio (born 1963) is a Scottish artist who creates site-specific, minimalist installations and often works with organic matter (including chocolate, sugar, flowers, and ice).

Her use of organic materials results in natural processes of transformation and decay, meaning that Gallaccio is unable to predict the result of her installations. Something which at the start of an exhibition may be pleasurable, such as the scent of flowers or chocolate, would inevitably become increasingly unpleasant over time. The timely and site-specific nature of her work makes it notoriously difficult to document. Her work, therefore, challenges the traditional notion that an art object or sculpture should essentially be a monument within a museum or gallery. Instead, her work often lives through the memory of those who saw and experienced it – or the concept of the artwork itself.

== Early life ==
Born in Paisley, Scotland, to TV producer George Gallaccio and actress Maureen Morris. She grew up in south west London, England and studied at Kingston Polytechnic (1984–85) and Goldsmiths College (1985–88). In 1988 Gallaccio exhibited in the Damien Hirst-curated Freeze exhibition, and in 1990 the Henry Bond and Sarah Lucas organised East Country Yard shows, which brought together many of the Young British Artists. Gallaccio is a professor in the Department of Visual Arts at the University of California, San Diego (UCSD).

== Works ==
Gallaccio is known for producing site-specific works that inhale the prescribed climate and space. She often collaborates closely with nature when selecting materials, exploring life cycles through the passage of time, memory, and loss. Much of her work uses organic materials, with fruit, vegetables and flowers all featuring in her work. Sometimes these materials undergo a change during the course of being exhibited.

In Red on Green (1992), her first solo showing at the Institute of Contemporary Arts, ten thousand rose heads placed on a bed of their stalks gradually withered as the exhibition went on. For Intensities and Surfaces (1996) Gallaccio left a thirty-two ton block of ice with a salt core in the disused pumping station at Wapping and allowed it to melt.

preserve 'beauty' 1991–2003 was an artwork which Gallaccio produced as a nominee for the 2003 Turner Prize. The installation consisted of a wall of gerbera daisies pinned behind a single sheet of glass. Behind glass, the flowers recall still-life and romantic landscape paintings, as well as flower arranging and pressing.

Other works by Gallaccio include Stroke (1993) in which benches in the gallery and cardboard panels attached to the walls were covered in chocolate, "Two Hundred Kilos of Apples Tied to a Barren Apple Tree", Atelier Amden, Amden, Switzerland (1999) and Because Nothing has Changed (2000), a bronze sculpture of a tree adorned with porcelain apples. Because I Could Not Stop (2002) is a similar bronze tree but with real apples which are left to rot.

Red on Green was recreated ten years later for the exhibition Blast to Freeze: British Art in the 20th Century mounted by Kunstmuseum Wolfsburg in 2002–2003 and for the 2004 British Council exhibition Turning Points: 20th Century British Sculpture.

In Stoke (2004), Gallaccio coated an old farm building at Edinburgh's Jupiter Artland with almost 90 pounds of 70 percent cocoa, confectioner-quality chocolate. The work invited visitors to lick, touch, and stroke the walls.

2005 saw the publication of Anya Gallaccio: Silver Seed by Ridinghouse, which accompanied the artist's exhibition commissioned by the Mount Stuart Trust for an installation at Mount Stuart on the Isle of Bute, Scotland, UK.

At Houghton Hall in Norfolk, the Marquess of Cholmondeley commissioned a folly to the east of the great house. "The Sybil Hedge" is an "artlandish" folly. It is based on the signature of the marquis' grandmother, Sybil Sassoon. Gallaccio has created a sarcophagus-like marble structure which is sited at the end of a path; and nearby is a copper-beech hedge which is planted in lines mirroring Sybil's signature.

Commissioned for The Whitworth Art Gallery, Untitled (2016), dubbed the ‘ghost tree’, investigates themes of life, death and nature. Inspired by the removal of a decaying tree, Gallaccio worked from digital scans of the removed tree, later reproducing in ribbons of complex stainless steel plates, a monumental and reflective 'ghost tree'. It has become "a haunting response to loss and a timeless monument to nature."

In a 2018 interview with Ocula, Gallaccio remarked of the YBA breakout exhibition Freeze: "It feels just as precarious now as it did then. And I think it is good to constantly remind myself of that and not to get complacent. The bravado and the chutzpah of Freeze was impressive; it was more about a kind of attitude and that is something that has had reverberations."

== Awards and acknowledgements ==
In 2006, she was listed on the Pink Power list of 100 most influential gay and lesbian people of 2006.

In 2003, Gallaccio was shortlisted for the Turner Prize alongside Grayson Perry, Jake and Dinos Chapman and Willie Doherty. One of her pieces for the show was preserve "beauty", 1991–2003, which was made from glass, fixings and 2,000 red gerberas.

== Exhibitions ==
- The Light Pours Out of Me, Jupiter Artland, Edinburgh, UK
- Freeze, Surrey Docks, London, UK
