= Simon Patterson (artist) =

English artist (born 1967)

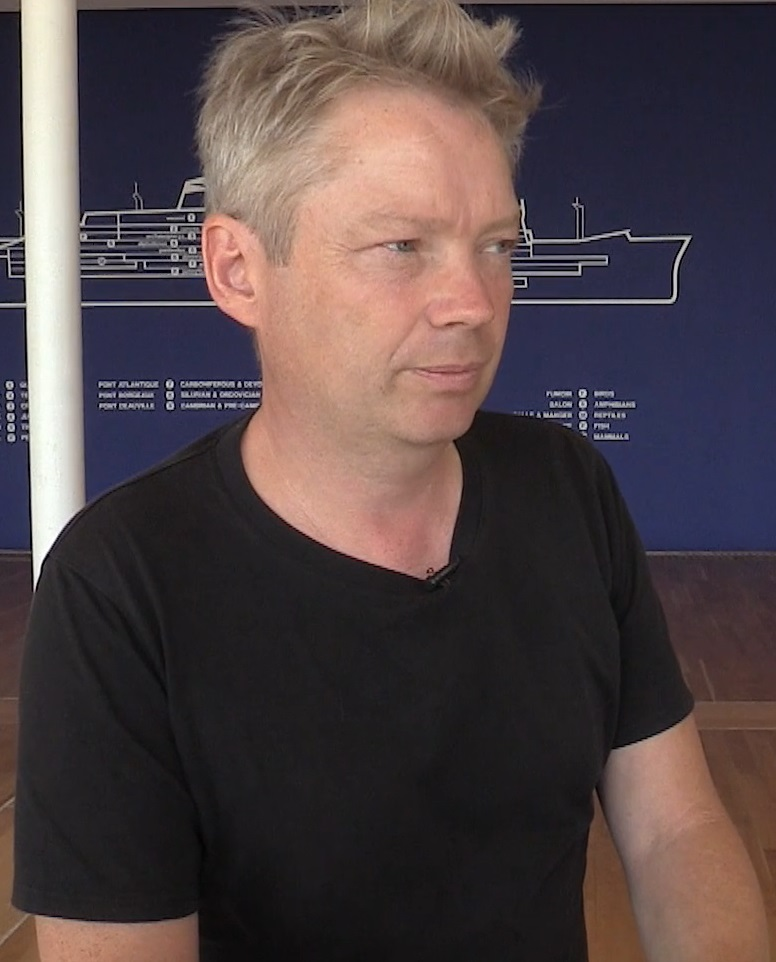
- Patterson, De La Warr Pavilion, July 2017
- Born: 1967 (age 58–59); Leatherhead, Surrey, England
- Education: Hertfordshire College and Goldsmiths College
- Notable work: The Great Bear
- Movement: YBAs

Simon Patterson (born 1967) is an English artist and was born in Leatherhead, Surrey. He was shortlisted for the Turner Prize in 1996 for his exhibitions at the Lisson Gallery, the Gandy Gallery, and three shows in Japan. He is the younger brother of the painter Richard Patterson.

== Life and career ==
Patterson attended Hertfordshire College of Art and Design and Goldsmiths College between 1985 and 1989. At Goldsmiths he was included in the Freeze Exhibition organized by Damien Hirst, showing two wall text pieces, one simply showing the names Richard Burton and Elizabeth Taylor, the other, The Last Supper Arranged According to the Flat Back Four Formation (Jesus Christ in Goal) showing the names of the Apostles arranged as different football team systems with Jesus in goal.

Patterson is perhaps best known for his work The Great Bear from 1992, an editioned print that reworks the London Underground map. Patterson is taking an order system that exists within the world and applies it to another set of subjects. In this case, he switched the names from the stations with names from famous people. Each Line is a different group of people, like actors, philosophers, footballers etc. An edition was purchased by Charles Saatchi and was shown in the Sensation exhibition of 1997, which toured London, Berlin and New York. An edition is in the Tate Gallery collection and is currently on display at Tate Britain in London.

Patterson has also created large-scale projects such as Cosmic Wallpaper at the University of Warwick, a Wilfred Owen tribute (Maison Forestière), and he also participated in the MoMA's The Project Series, 70, Banners I. The project's goal for each Simon, Shirin Neshat and Xu Bing was to test the ramifications of the written word in their own unique perspective to be displayed at the museum's Fifty-third Street facade flanked by banners bearing MoMA's logo from 22 November 1999 to 1 May 2000.

Simon Patterson was a staff member at the Slade School of Fine Art.
