= The Great Bear (lithograph) =

The Great Bear is a 1992 lithograph by Simon Patterson. The work resembles the London Underground Tube map, but Patterson uses each line to represent notable but seemingly random people (and planets) grouped into categories corresponding to each Tube line.

The work is in an edition of 50 prints alongside 15 artist's proofs, all framed with an anodised aluminium frame just like real Tube maps. The copyright of the work is shared between the artist and London Underground from whom the artist obtained permission after protracted negotiation.

The name 'Great Bear' references the constellation Ursa Major. The artist may be evoking a similarity between the Tube map and maps of the stars, with the lines forming constellations between them.

Copies of The Great Bear can be found in the Tate Gallery (P77880) and the London Transport Museum (2003/12651).

== Categories and Tube lines ==
The full categories, presented in a key at the bottom left of the map, are:

- Engineers as the Bakerloo Line
- "Louis" (French Kings) as the Central Line
- Philosophers as the Circle Line
- Explorers as the District Line
- Planets as the East London Line
- Journalists as the Hammersmith and City Line
- Footballers as the Jubilee Line
- Musicians as the Metropolitan Line
- Film actors as the Northern Line
- Saints as the Piccadilly Line
- Italian artists as the Victoria Line
- Sinologues as the Docklands Light Railway
- Comedians as the North London Line

== Meaning and responses ==
About his own work, Patterson said in 1994,

There is no code to be cracked in any of my work. Meanings may not be obvious, you may not get a joke, but nothing is really cryptic - I'm not interested in mystification. I like disrupting something people take as read. I am not simply pulling the rug out from people. I am not nihilistic. What interests me is juxtaposing different paths of knowledge to form more than the sum of their parts.

Ian Russell, writing in Images, representations and heritage: moving beyond modern approaches to archaeology in 2006, felt that the map emphasises that "the tube map distorts and masks realities". Social historian Joe Moran wrote in his 2005 work Reading the Everyday that the map "suggests that the tube map has become its own reality, entirely abstracted from the work it ostensibly represents". David Pike, author of 'Modernist Space and the Transformation of Underground London', expressed his belief that Patterson "discovered the dreams of modernism within the world of the 1990s in the same way that he found the dreams of the present lurking within the modernist space of Harry Beck's underground map", comparing the work to the writing of Iain Sinclair and the artwork of Mark Dion.
