= Lala Meredith-Vula =

Renowned Artist and Professor of Fine Art and Photography

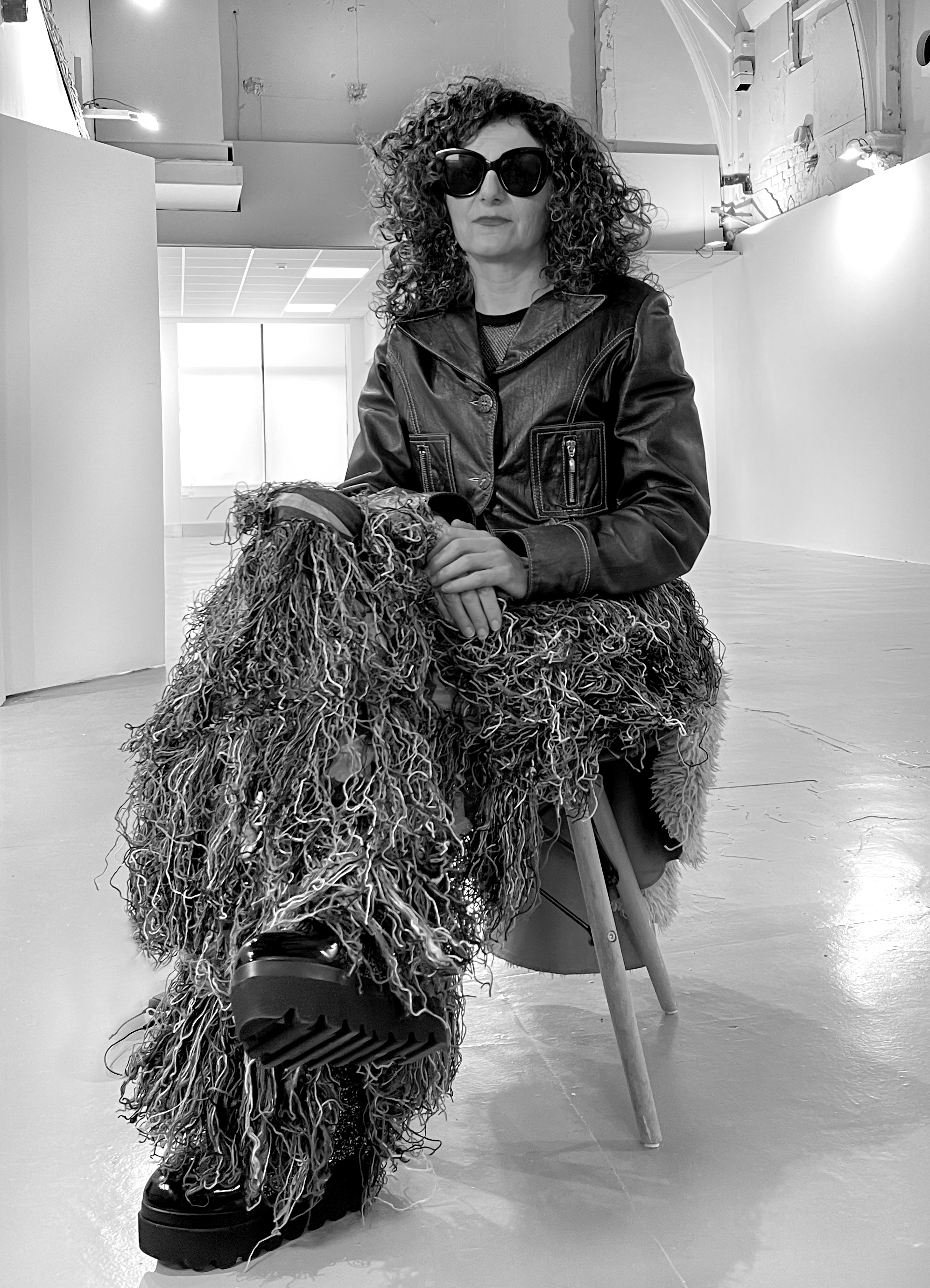
- Lala being interviewed for "The Bad Girls and Boys of British Art" BBC in 2022
- Born: Sarajevo, Bosnia
- Education: Nottingham Trent University; Goldsmiths College, University of London; University of Prishtina, Kosovo
- Occupations: Artist; Professor of Art and Photography
- Known for: Art & Performance; Epic Photography; Documentary Photography; Film; Identity; Diversity; Reconciliation
- Notable work: Blood Memory; Haystacks; Women and Water
- Movement: Contemporary Art, Contemporary Photography, Young British Artists
- Website: Official website

Photo by Lala Meredith-Vula from the series "Women and Water"

Lala Meredith-Vula (born 1966) is a British-Albanian artist and Professor of Art and Photography at De Montfort University, Leicester. Their work explores themes of identity, memory, migration, landscape, conflict and cultural heritage with a particular focus on the Balkans.

Meredith-Vula first came to prominence in 1988 as one of the artists shown in Freeze, the landmark exhibition curated by Damien Hirst that helped launch the Young British Artists movement. Since then they have exhibited internationally, representing Albania at the 48th Venice Biennale in 1999 and participating in documenta 14 in Kassel and Athens in 2017.

Best known for long-term photographic projects including Haystacks, Blood Memory and Women in Water, Meredith-Vula's work combines documentary photography with conceptual art to examine questions of cultural identity, social history and post-conflict reconciliation. Their work is held in numerous international public and private collections.

== Early life and education ==
Meredith-Vula was born in Sarajevo, Bosnia and Herzegovinia, to an Albanian father and an English mother. They moved to England with their mother in 1970 and later completed an Art Foundation course at Nottingham Trent University, Nottingham (1984–85) and a Fine Art degree at Goldsmiths College, University of London graduating in 1988. They subsequently undertook postgraduate studies at the University of Prishtina, Kosova, developing an artistic practice there that drew upon both their British upbringing and Balkan heritage.

== Artistic practice ==
Meredith-Vula's photography examines the relationship between landscape, memory, identity and political history. working primarily through long-term documentary projects, they combine conceptual approaches with observational photography to explore the cultural and social histories of communities across the Balkans.

Rather than documenting events alone, their work investigates how place, tradition and collective memory shape individual and national identity. Throughout their career they have returned repeatedly to Kosovo and Albania, producing bodies of work over several decades that reflect social change, migration and post-conflict reconstruction.

== Major bodies of work ==
Haystacks

Begun in 1989 and continuing to the present day, Haystacks is Meredith-Vula's longest running artistic project. The series documents traditional haystacks constructed by farmers throughout Kosovo and neighbouring regions. While rooted in documentary photography, the project explores the sculptural qualities of vernacular agricultural forms, questioning distinctions between everyday labour and contemporary art.

Having studied art for many years and visited many galleries throughout the world I soon found that the context of a work of art played a major part on where it is placed. For all my research, it took my returning home to discover the real significance of my search, it was in the fields of my former home town that I witnessed a way of life as old as the land itself where farmers went about their business, everything had its place. Within all this I saw that somehow the farmers were unconsciously creating strange sculptures that had the presence of modern sculptural pieces. Here part of my search was over. I had found the meeting place between my new world of art, being an artist, and my past, in the landscape of Kosova.

— Lala Meredith-Vula

The series has been exhibited internationally, including at The Photographers' Gallery in London, Croatian Fine Art Society, Zagreb, National Gallery of Kosovo, Kosova, Marubi National Museum of Photography, Albania and documenta 14 in Kassel and Athens. Over nearly four decades Meredith-Vula has produced thousands of images, creating one of the most extensive visual records of disappearing rural traditions in the Balkans.

Blood Memory

Blood Memory documents the Blood Feud Reconciliation movement that emerged in Kosova during 1990 and 1991. Meredith-Vula photographed meetings, communities and individuals involved in one of the largest grassroots reconciliation movements in Europe during the late twentieth century.

The project has been exhibited internationally and is recognised for documenting an important period in Kosovo's modern history through photography. It combines documentary practice with wider questions concerning memory, anthropology, conflict and collective identity.

Women and Water

Produced over several years, Women and Water explores the female body within natural environments. The photographs challenge conventional representations of women through images that emphasise movement, vulnerability and freedom, using water as both subject and metaphor.

"Women and Water" is about the beauty and imperfection of the free body underwater. Many women feel they have been deformed by social influences, particularly in the West. In the water they are free to dissolve and re-appear as a part of nature both classical and expressive.

— Lala Meredith-Vula

The series reflects Meredith-Vula's continuing interest in identity, transformation and the relationship between the human body and the landscape.

== Teaching and influence ==
Alongside their artistic practice, Meredith-Vula has pursued a career in higher education. Since 1989 they have taught art and photography in the United Kingdom, the United States and Kosovo.

In 1995, they established the first photography department at the University of Tirana, Albania. Five years later they founded a photography department at the University of Prishtina, Kosovo, contributing to the development of photographic education in the region following the conflicts of the 1990's.

They are a Professor of Art and Photography at DeMontfort University, Leicester, where they continue to teach while maintaining and international exhibition practice.

In 1992 they were a researcher on a BBC documentary film "Under the Sun". In 1988, they were one of the exhibitors in the exhibition Freeze, curated by Damien Hirst which showcased the work of many of the artists who were later to become known as the Young British Artists.

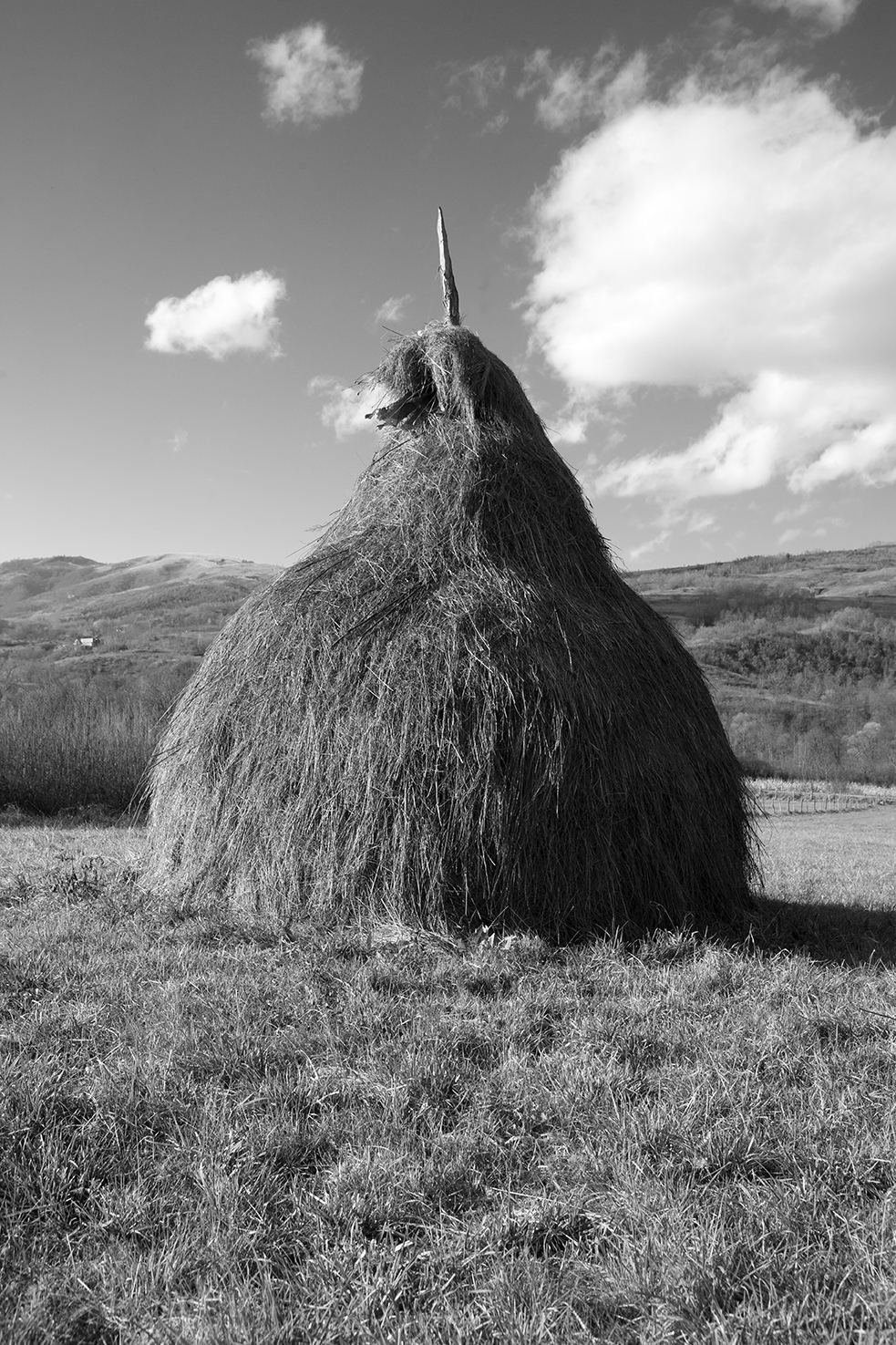
Photo by Lala Meredith-Vula "Haystacks", Brezovica, Kosova 2016

== Exhibitions ==
Selected solo exhibitions

- 2023 - 'What I didn’t know, I knew’ Ministry of Culture Gallery, Kosova
- 2020 - ‘The Forest is the Museum’ Fermywoods Contemporary Art, United Kingdom
- 2018 - ‘Select Haystacks (1989-ongoing)’ Alberto Peola Arte Contemporanea, Turin
- 2017 - ‘Wisdom today and forever’ Marubi National Museum of Photography, Albania
- 2015 - 'Blood Memory' National Gallery of Kosovo, Kosova

Selected group exhibitions

- 2026 - 'Not all people exist in the same Now' National Gallery of Kosovo, Kosova
- 2025 - Coventry Biennial 2025 – ‘Obsessions, Possessions - in transit under another sky’. Herbert Art Gallery & Museum, Coventry
- 2023 - EVA International Ireland’s Biennial of Contemporary Art, Limerick City Gallery of Art and University of Limerick Ireland
- 2017 - documenta 14, Kassel and Athens
- 1999 - 48th Venice Biennale, Venice
- 1988 - Freeze, Surrey Docks, London

== Collections ==
Lala Meredith-Vula's work is represented in numerous public and private collections, including:-

- Arts Council of Great Britain
- The British Council Collection
- Centre de la photographie Genève (CPG)
- Collezione La Gaia
- Galleria Doria Pamphilj, Rome
- Fondazione Teseco per l'Arte
- National Gallery of Kosovo

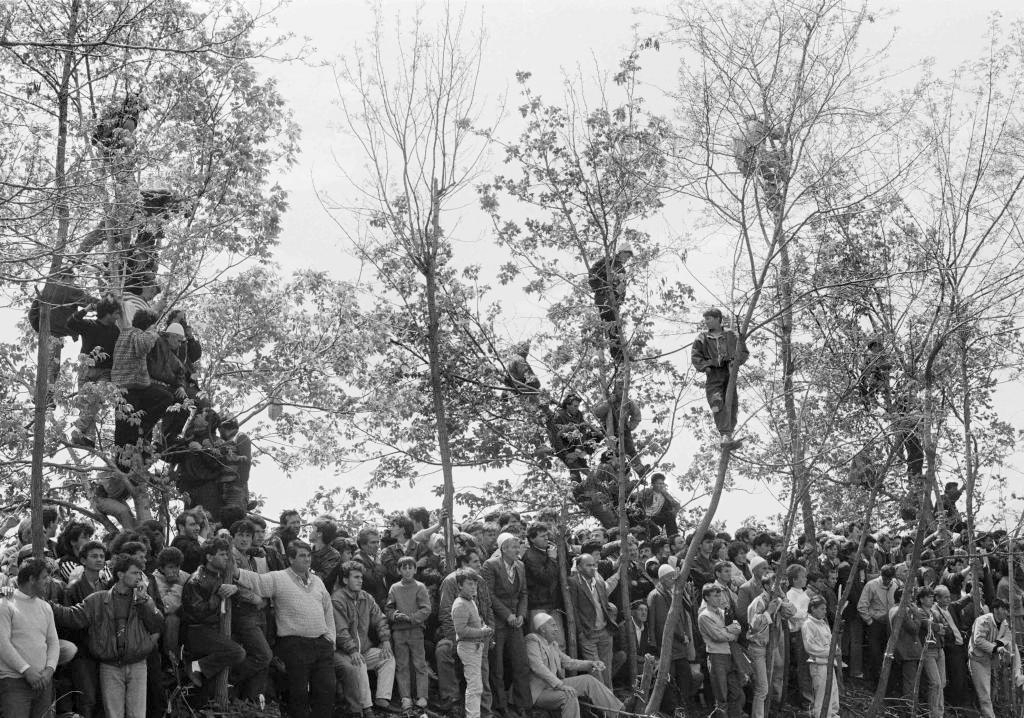
Photo by Lala Meredith-Vula, "Blood Memory"

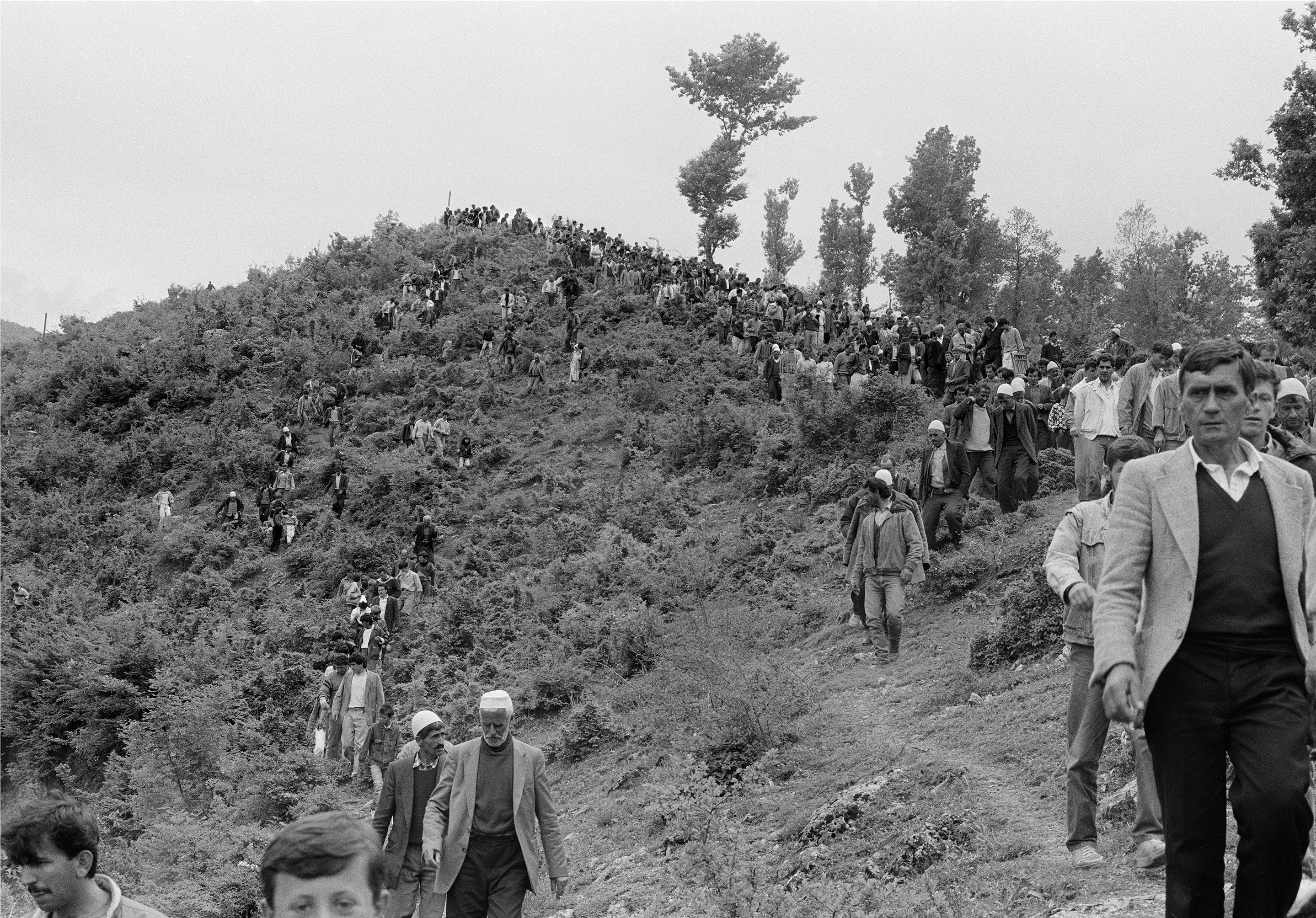
Photo by Lala Meredith-Vula from "Blood Memory", Gjonaj, Kosova, 2 May 1999

== Awards ==
- 2020 - Shpilman International Prize for Excellence in Photography by the Israel Museum, Jerusalem. Short list.
- 2018 - Deutsche Börse Foundation Photography Prize for the most significant contribution, through an exhibition, to photography in Europe. Long list.
- 2016 - Deutsche Börse Foundation Photography Prize for solo exhibition Blood Memory at National Gallery of Kosovo, Pristina. Long list.
- 2006 - Bryan Robertson Trust Artist Award.
- 2002 - "Paul Hamlyn Award". Nominated.
- 2001 - Sargant Fellowship, British School at Rome (BSR), Italy.
- 1998 - "Flash Art" Prize, Onufri '98, National Gallery, Albania.
- 1998 - "Special Jury Prize", PhotoSynkria Festival, Greece.
- 1997 - London Art Board's "Individual Artists Award".

== Selected publications ==
- Blood Memory (Published by National Gallery of Kosovo. ISBN 978-9951-587-46-4)
- Interlude (Introduction by Ian Jeffrey. ISBN 978-1-85721-415-4)
- Shifting Borders (Introduction by Ian Jeffrey. ISBN 978-1-85721-383-6)
- Contributions to Biennials and Beyond - Exhibitions That Made Art History 1962-2002 (Published by Phaidon Press ISBN 978-0-7148-6495-2)
- Contributions to Artrage/ The Inside Story of the BritArt Revolution (Authored by Elizabeth Fullerton and published by Thames & Hudson. ISBN 978-0-500-29633-2 )

== Critical reception ==
- New York Times, 5th April 2017, German Art Exhibition Documenta Expands Into Athens By RACHEL DONADIO - The Albanian-English artist Lala Meredith-Vula installing their work in Athens from the series “Blood Memory.” Credit Eirini Vourloumis for The New York Times
