= Liberty Grip =

Sculpture by Gary Hume

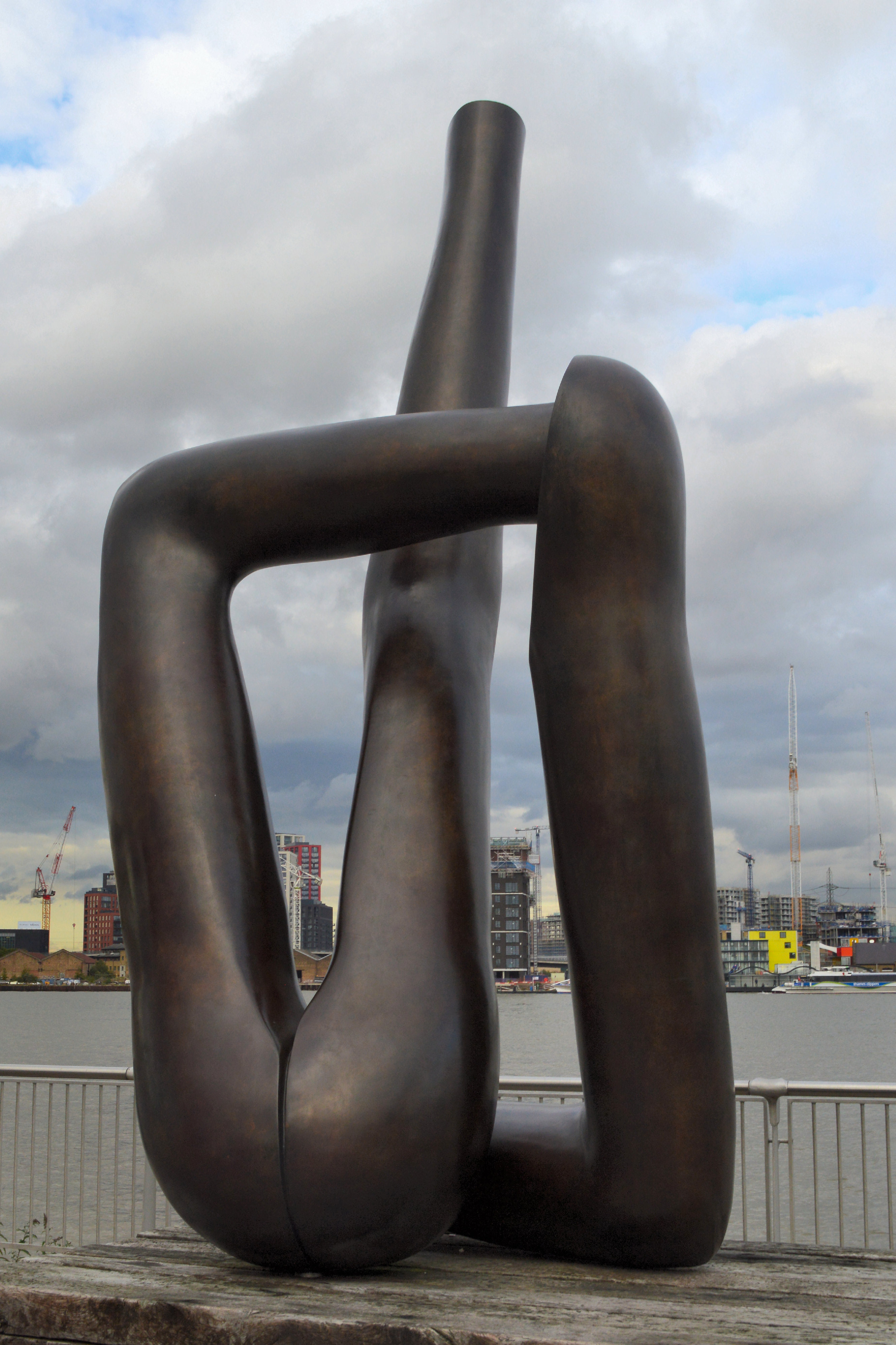
- Artist: Gary Hume
- Year: 2008
- Medium: Bronze
- Location: North Greenwich, London; 51.50437°N 0.00509°E

Liberty Grip is a 2008 sculpture in bronze by English artist Gary Hume. The sculpture is today situated on a riverside path on the east side of The O2 at North Greenwich in south-east London, where it forms part of The Line, a public art trail that very roughly follows the path of the Prime Meridian as it crosses the River Thames.

== History ==
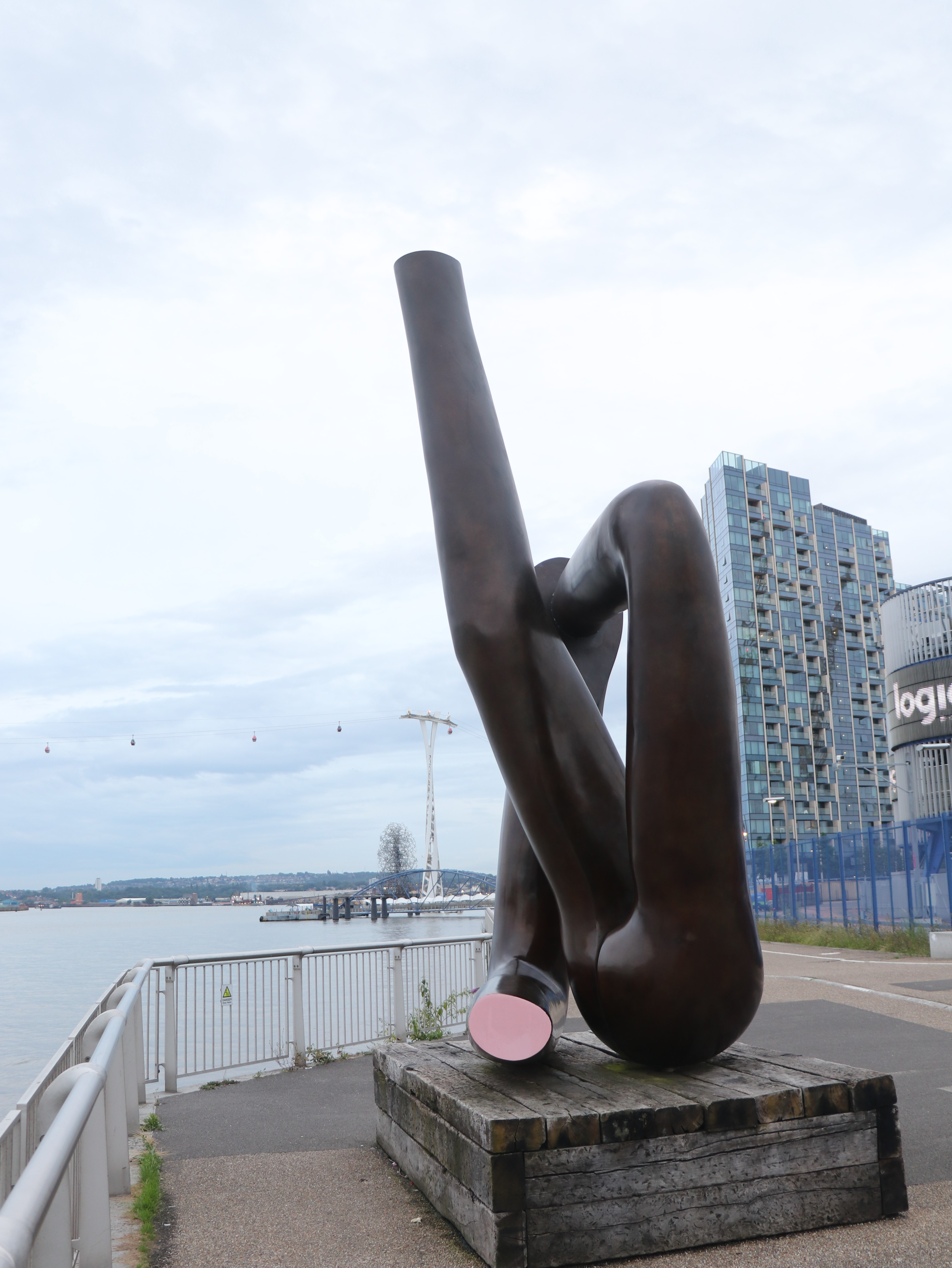
Liberty Grip, at North Greenwich, London, with (to left of cable car pylon), Anthony Gormley's Quantum Cloud, also part of The Line, in the background

Created in 2008, Hume modelled Liberty Grip in three discrete sections using the arm of a mannequin as a template, and it was exhibited at White Cube gallery in Bermondsey, London in 2013. In describing the work, the gallery said "Hume ... positioned the three arms into an evocative group of forms that suggests both a bundle of limbs or a contorted hand."

In 2014 it was one of nine works chosen from over 70 submissions for the inaugural year of The Line, an art project distributed along a 3-mile (4.8 km) route following some of London's waterways between Stratford and North Greenwich. The route opened in 2015. The five Greenwich elements of The Line also form part of an art trail across the Greenwich Peninsula.
