= Georgina Starr =

English artist (born 1968)

- Born: Georgina Starr; 1968 (age 57–58); Leeds, England
- Education: Slade School; 1990–1992
- Known for: Installation art
- Notable work: "The Nine Collections of the Seventh Museum" "Visit to a Small Planet" "Crying" "Hypnodreamdruff" "The Bunny Lake Series" "Theda" "I am a record"
- Movement: Young British Artists

Georgina Starr (born 1968) is an English artist and one of the Young British Artists. She is best known for her video, sound, performance and installation works. Starr's work has been described in Artforum magazine as exploring "the imaginative self’s ability to make something magically complex, layered and densely referential out of virtually nothing but its own 'stuff'”

== Life and work ==
Starr was born in Leeds and lives and works in London. She studied at Jacob Kramer school of Art, Middlesex Polytechnic, attended the Slade School of Art from 1990 until 1992 and the Rijksakademie Van Beeldende Kunst in Amsterdam from 1993 to 1994. She has exhibited widely in group and solo exhibitions, including the Tate Gallery in London, the Museum of Modern Art in New York City, the Venice Biennale, and in galleries in cities throughout the world including Basel, Tokyo, Ghent, Brisbane, and Barcelona.

She has been identified as a member of the second wave of Young British Artists.

Whether playing a lonely teenager re-enacting a high school play (Frenchy, 1996), a nightclub singer with schizophrenia (The Hungry Brain, 1995), a visitor from another planet (Visit to a Small Planet, 1994), a silent movie star (THEDA, 2007–10), a ventriloquist or psychic medium, her face and voice are always the focus, constantly changing and morphing as she performs. As David Frankel noted in Artforum, ”she seems both a familiar presence and at the same time unknowable, one multifaceted figure- she is all of them-but at the same time non-of them at all… Starr proposes a model of art-making and combines the baroque with the spontaneous….the frame is fiction".

Starr's first video Static Steps in 1992 featured small paper figures reacting physically to "random static electricity" and added a voice-over narrating the 'steps' as if the movements were rehearsed dance steps. The idea was to re-describe invisible and "often random aspects of modern life" so they seem important.

In 1993, Starr's video Crying was described as "euphoric"." A review from 1996 said of Crying, “ If expressionist art demands the simultaneous release and recording of deep feeling, then this might be expressionism's quintessence – but as the tape plays again, and again, emotion becomes performance. What may have been a problem for Jackson Pollock here appears as strategy: repeated, the gesture that carries emotion loses meaning. Yet enough of a trace of it remains that one would be ashamed to write it off as rote or fake; better to say that it becomes elusive and unreliable. And Starr, who seems to show us herself so openly, eludes us too."

In 1994, Starr's Visit to a Small Planet featured videos, photographs, objects and drawings based loosely on a memory of a Jerry Lewis film called Visit to a Small Planet which evoked many emotional states. In the five screen videos Starr was given special powers of mind-reading, invisibility and animal telepathy. The large installation was exhibited as a solo exhibition at Kunsthalle Zurich in 1995 alongside the publication of her first book, "Visit to a Small Planet", a script which spanned the years 1978 (when she saw the original film aged 10) to the present day. The work then toured in the British Art Show4.

In 1996, Starr made Hypnodreamdruff which began as a film script, but turned into a "multi-screen, multi-media installation incorporating a nightclub, bedroom, kitchen and caravan," according to a description on her website. It was exhibited in Amsterdam at Stedelijk Museum in 1995, Tate London in 1996, in New York City at Barbara Gladstone in 1996, and Kunstmuseum Wolfsburg, Germany in 1997. Hypnodreamdruff was a complex narrative of the "interior life" of one of three fictional people sharing an apartment and was described as a "rowdy yet poignant portrait of the alienation and fantasy of everyday life."

David Frankel described the work in Artforum as "involving a series of interlocking situations or narratives carried by videos and installations, their sites ranging from a 1970’s caravan seen in Magic to a teenage girl's bedroom (in Frenchy) to a nightclub (The Hungry Brain) to the kitchen of three London flatmates (Dream Interference Device). An amalgam of dream, memory, reenactment, and something like TV sitcom…”

Critic Dan Glaister of The Guardian reported that Catherine Lampert of the Whitechapel Gallery was surprised that no women were nominated for the 1996 Turner prize; Lampert said "Tracey Emin and Georgina Starr have both produced notable work this year (1996)."

In 1998, critic Tim Hilton of The Independent described Starr's Tuberama as an "expensively constructed" model tube train which went around the gallery while an animated film by Starr played simultaneously with "loud music." Critic and pop singer Momus described Tuberama as "the musical of the short story of the cartoon strip of the painting, is about sitting on the tube and feeling paranoid about the people opposite you: who would be their leader if the train broke down for a week?"

In his essay, Tuberama, A Musical on the Northern Line Filip Luyckx describes Tuberama : "While we identify ourselves with Georgina, she translates, as if she were a thought-reading machine, what goes on in the minds of the passengers…..The eroticising aspect of the imagination in contemporary mass culture finds a grateful subject here. A work like Tuberama starts as a comic strip and gradually overruns into our reality."

In a review in Art Monthly in 2000 a critic described Starr's new exhibition in London The Bunny Lakes are Coming: "Art is meant to be more sensitive than popular culture but doesn't always manage it. The Bunny Lakes are Coming is a melange of pop cultural melancholy and terror that is as sensitive as a fresh bruise. Starr's longstanding interest in the exploration of internality through the products of popular culture has been chided in the past. If returning home is a way of testing whether you have moved one, Starr has not endeavoured to please. Her new work is as dark as her early work was light. Maybe her early work was too soft, now it's too soft to touch."

In 2007, film critic Jonathan Romney described Starr's new silent film Theda : "In a 40-minute black-and-white film Theda British artist Georgina Starr, best known for her series of works inspired by the 1965 thriller Bunny Lake is Missing, pays tribute to this stormiest of divas and undertakes an archeology of gestural art of the silent-era actress (Theda Bara), drawing on the styles of several other now forgotten grande-dames, such as Barbara La Marr and Maud Allan.....the film is divided into three parts "prelude", "act" and "epilogue"....but "prelude " is the real coup: in a long single take, Starr runs through the codified expressive repertoire of the Theda-era performer with such precision that any ironic distance evaporate. The poster for "Theda" show a séance and indeed Starr makes herself the medium. Through her playful, tender homage the silent goddesses speak again."

Art critic John Zinsser described his reaction to Starr's show Theda in New York City: "It was a show that revealed itself to me very slowly" which was "full of surprises" and that the personality of the show was "very strong" and "beguiling in its nuttiness." Zinsser described Starr as a "video artist" whose work featured a book about a "movie that you didn't see" which was "written in a faux academic style". Critic Gregory Volk compared Starr to writers like Emerson in making a "meter making argument" and that her show was "so out there" and "crazily eccentric" and "crazily adventurous" and, as a result, "utterly convincing." Theda toured as a film with live soundtrack to New York City, Toronto, Tokyo, Liverpool, Basel, Berlin, Genoa and Stockholm. In 2011 a new score was composed by the German soprano Sigune von Osten for a live performance at The Pier Theatre in Bournemouth.

Starr was a judge for the Northern Art Prize in 2008. The Guardian reported in November 2008 that Starr was dating artist Paul Noble who paints "debauched imaginary townscapes." Starr and Noble traveled to Palestine and both worked at the International Academy of Art Palestine. Artist Andrew Palmer credits Starr for influencing his thinking about art. In November 2008, Starr put artwork from her project Bunny Lake and reproduced them on a Vespa scooter in a project to raise funds for charity.

Starr's 2010 project I am a Record, according to a website description, dissected and revealed "the artist's personal, geographic and imagined environment" and featured a wide variety of recordings made since age five including the rumbling of a broken radiator which she thought was "speaking to her," "re-enactments of secretly recorded stranger's conversation," field recordings, singing voices, paranormal telephony, family dinner conversations, "air eddies transformed into music," and other unusual sounds. It is an audio collection featuring over 80 vinyl records with handmade cover artwork, posters, inserts and booklets. The monograph I am a Record was published in 2010 by Le Confort Moderne. A large retrospective exhibition of Starr's work entitled "Hello. Come here. I want you." was held in France at Frac Franche-Comté in 2017 presenting earlier works alongside newly commissioned installations. Starr's film "Quarantaine" was commissioned by Film Video Umbrella London, Glasgow International, Hunterian Gallery, Leeds Art Gallery & The Art Fund in 2020. The film was nominated for the Jarman Award in 2021. Her first novel, "The Discreet Dash" was published by JOAN Publishing in 2025.

== Books ==
- "Georgina Starr", Ikon Gallery, 1998.
- "The Bunny Lakes", Emily Tsingou Gallery 2002.
- "THEDA", 2007
- "I am a Record", Le Confort Moderne, 2010
- "The History of Sculpture", 2014
- "The Discreet Dash", JOAN Publishing, 2025

== Works ==
- Whistle 1992
- Static Steps 1992
- Crying 1993
- Erik 1994
- Visit to a Small Planet 1994
- The Nine Collections of the Seventh Museum 1994
- Getting to Know You 1995
- The Party 1995
- Hypnodreamdruff 1996
- Tuberama 1998
- The Bunny Lake Series 1999-2004
- Big V 2005
- Theda 2007-10
- I Am a Record 2010
- I Am the Medium 2010
- Before Le Cerveau Affamé 2013
- I, Cave 2015
- Androgynous Egg 2017
- Moment Memory Monument 2017
- Quarantaine (Film) 2020
- Gelato Balleto (Performance) 2022
- The Triangles of Ursula (Performance) 2024
- Rouge Brillant Silky (Performance) 2025
- The Discreet Dash ( A novel) 2025
