= Fiona Rae =

British artist

- Born: 10 October 1963 (age 63); Hong Kong
- Known for: Painting

Fiona Rae RA (born 10 October 1963) is a Hong Kong-born British artist. She is one of the Young British Artists (YBAs) who rose to prominence in the 1990s. Throughout her career she has been known for a portfolio of work that includes elements of energy and complexity. Her work is known for aiming to expand the modern traditions of painting.

Untitled (yellow) (1990)

== Life and career ==
Rae was born in Hong Kong and also lived in Indonesia before moving to England in 1970. After moving to England she attended Downe House, an all girls boarding school in Berkshire. She then attended Croydon College of Art for a Foundation Course (1983–1984) and Goldsmiths College (1984–1987), where she completed a BA (Hons) in Fine Art.

=== Young British Artist ===
In 1988 she participated in Freeze, an art exhibition organised by Damien Hirst in London Docklands; the exhibition helped launch a generation of artists who became known as the Young British Artists or YBAs.

In 1991 Rae was shortlisted for the Turner Prize, and in 1993 she was nominated for the Austrian Eliette Von Karajan Prize for Young Painters.

She was elected to the Royal Academy of Arts in 2002 and appointed a Tate Artist Trustee between 2005 and 2009. She was commissioned by Tate Modern to create a 10-metre triptych Shadowland for the restaurant there in 2002.

In December 2011, she was appointed Professor of Painting at the Royal Academy, one of the first two female professors since the Academy was founded in 1768.

Rae has exhibited extensively in museums and galleries internationally and her work is held in public and private collections worldwide. Of her work, William Corwin says, "Rae's paintings are very much objects to be admired; windows into worlds in which she is mistress, giving the viewer over to a semi-recognizable, occasionally comforting, but mostly alien dreamscape."

== Public collections ==
- Tate Collection: five works: ‘Untitled (yellow)’, 1990, ‘Untitled (grey and brown)’, 1991, ‘Untitled (emergency room)’, 1996, ‘Night Vision', 1998, ‘Shadowland', 2002
- Hirshhorn Museum and Sculpture Garden, Washington D.C.; 'Sunburst Finish' (1997)
- Royal Academy of Arts, London, UK; 'Untitled (six on brown)'
- Sintra Museum of Modern Art: The Berardo Collection, Sintra, Portugal
- Southampton City Art Gallery, England (6/1998); Fast Breeder

== Solo exhibitions ==
Following the success of 'Freeze' in 1988, Rae's paintings have appeared in solo shows internationally.

- 'Fiona Rae' Kunsthalle Basel, Switzerland (1992)
- 'Fiona Rae' at the Institute of Contemporary Arts, London (1993–1994)
- 'Fiona Rae', Carré d'Art Musée d'art contemporain de Nîmes, France (2002–2003)

== Publications ==
Aside from numerous exhibition catalogues, Rae’s paintings are discussed in many publications including:

- 1996 – Morgan, Stuart, "Fiona Rae: Playing for Time", What the Butler Saw, Ian Hunt (ed.), London, UK: Durian Publications
- 1996 – The 20th-Century Art Book, London, UK, Phaidon Press
- 1999 – Stallabrass, Julian, High Art Lite: British Art in the 1990s, Verso London and New York
- 1997 – Button, Virginia, The Turner Prize, London, UK, Tate Gallery Publishing
- 2004 – Tate Women Artists, text by Alicia Foster, London, UK, Tate Gallery Publishing
- 2006 – Tate Modern: The Handbook, Frances Morris (ed.), texts by Michael Craig-Martin, Andrew Marr and Sheena Wagstaff, London, UK, Tate Publishing
- 2007 – The Turner Prize. Revised Edition, Virginia Button, London, UK, Tate Publishing
- 2007 – Open Space: Art in the Public Realm in London 1995–2005, Jemima Montagu (ed.), London, UK, Arts Council England and Central London Partnership
- 2009 – Painting Today, Tony Godfrey (ed.), London, UK, Phaidon Press
- 2010 – Barret, Terry, Making Art: Form and Meaning, New York City: McGraw-Hill Publishers
- 2010 – Pooke, Grant, Contemporary British Art: An Introduction, London, UK: Routledge
- 2012 – Fiona Rae: maybe you can live on the moon in the next century, London, UK: Ridinghouse in association with Leeds Art Gallery.
