= Stephen Park (artist) =

British artist and comic performer (born 1962)

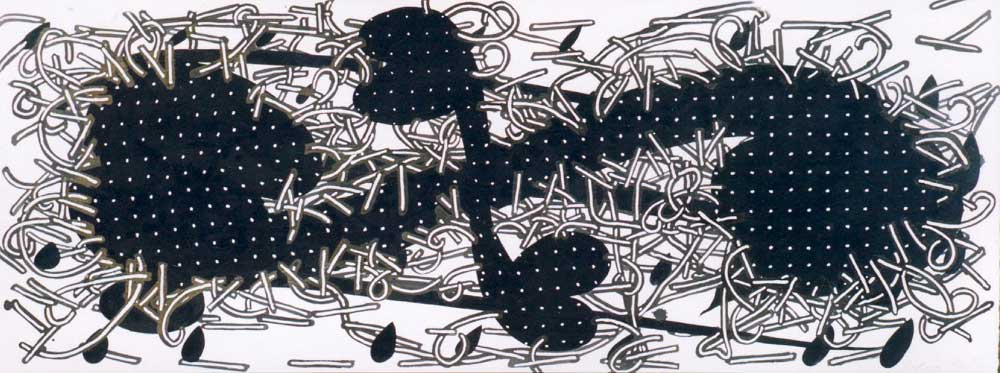
Untitled drawing by Stephen Park

Stephen Park (born 1962) is a British artist and comic performer. He was briefly associated with the Young British Artists (YBAs) in the late 1980s and early 1990s, and included in the seminal Freeze show.

== Life and work ==
Stephen Park was born in Edinburgh and grew up in Newcastle where he attended Bath Lane College of Art (1981–82). He moved to London in 1982 where he attended Goldsmiths College (1982–1985) and then the Slade School of Fine Art (1985–1987). Early in his career he was included in exhibitions at the Institute of Contemporary Arts and the Serpentine Gallery. He was one of the artists in the exhibition Freeze curated by Damien Hirst in 1988. He subsequently distanced himself from the YBAs and consequently remains relatively unknown.

In the early 1990s he returned to the Slade School of Fine Art for two years as the Henry Moore Fellow. In 1998, he exhibited drawings and sculpture at the Richard Salmon Gallery. Since 2003 he has performed in the South West of England as a comedian and stand-up poet, including appearances at the Port Eliot LitFest. He is one of the hosts of a regular poetry/cabaret event in Totnes called One Night Stanza (which was given its name by Matt Harvey. Since 1987, Park has been working on a series of abstract drawings. The drawings are made with indian ink, gouache and typewriter correction fluid on Fabriano paper.
