= East Country Yard Show =

View of East Country Yard Show with Anya Gallaccio's installation in foreground, 1990.

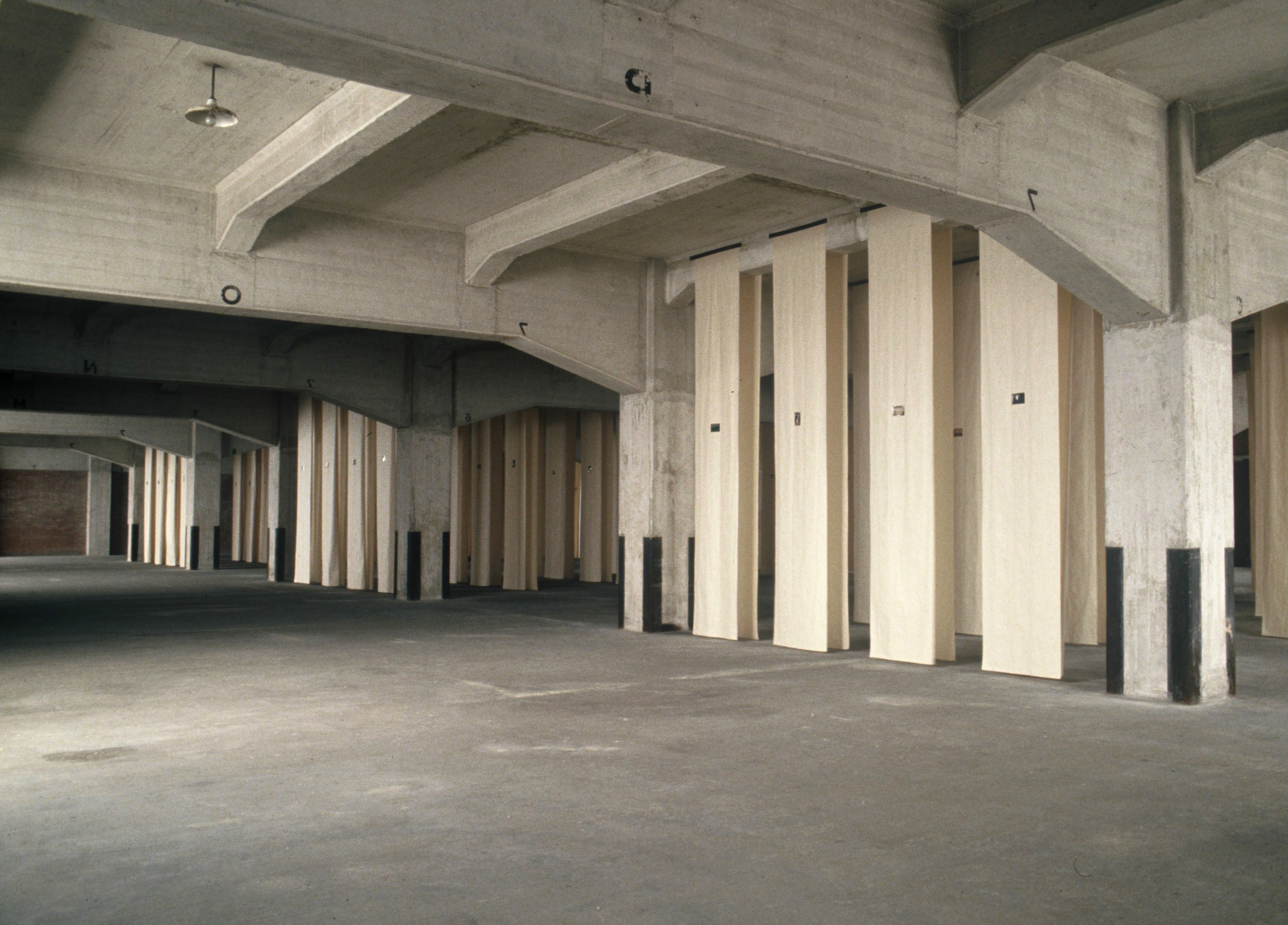
View across second floor of East Country Yard Show warehouse exhibition in Surrey Docks, June 1990.

East Country Yard Show was an exhibition of contemporary art organized by Henry Bond and Sarah Lucas. It was on view between 31 May—22 June 1990. The exhibition was a "seminal" London group show which was significant in the subsequent development of the Young British Artists.

== Location and scale ==
The show was presented in a large empty warehouse, the East Country Yard building, in South Dock, Rotherhithe within the 460-acre (1.9 km^{2}) Surrey Commercial Docks complex. The docks were closed in 1969, and by 1990 were being redeveloped by a plethora of property development companies. One of them, Skillion—who had purchased several large buildings but had not yet begun to develop them—was approached by Bond. Reviewing the show in Time Out the art critic David Lillington said, "The East Country Yard is a gigantic complex of old warehouses in which each artist has a 200-foot-long room." Equally, writing in his book Lucky Kunst: The Rise and Fall of Young British Art, commentator Gregor muir said, "'East Country Yard' in South Dock, Docklands ... featured huge installations by Gary Hume and Anya Gallaccio, and could claim to have taken place in a space four times the size of Saatchi Gallery."

== Exhibited artists ==
- Henry Bond
- Anya Gallaccio
- Gary Hume
- Michael Landy
- Sarah Lucas
- Virginia Nimarkoh
- Tom Trevor

== Critical reception ==
The cover of the exhibition catalogue, designed by Area, emphasized an unadorned industrial aesthetic.

Writing in The Independent, art critic Andrew Graham-Dixon said,

Goldsmiths' graduates are unembarrassed about promoting themselves and their work: some of the most striking exhibitions in London over the past few months—"The East Country Yard Show", or "Gambler", both staged in docklands—have been independently organized and funded by Goldsmiths' graduates as showcases for their work. This has given them a reputation for pushiness, yet it should also be said that in terms of ambition, attention to display and sheer bravado there has been little to match such shows in the country's established contemporary art institutions. They were far superior, for instance, to any of the contemporary art shows that have been staged by the Liverpool Tate in its own multi-million-pound dockland site.

Writing in Artforum, Kate Bush said,

[Hirst's] Freeze anticipated a spate of do-it-yourself group shows staged in cheap, sprawling, ex-industrial spaces in recession-hit East London. Henry Bond and Sarah Lucas's East Country Yard Show as well as Carl Freedman and Billee Sellman's Modern Medicine and Gambler, all in 1990, were, with Freeze, the shows that fueled the myth of YBA as, paradoxically, both oppositional and entrepreneurial.

Keith Patrick said,

[Following Freeze] many of the same artists showed again two years later in four artist-led exhibitions Modern Medicine, Gambler, the East Country Yard Show and Market ... although Freeze had been poorly attended and barely reviewed, these shows together became a symbol of a new artist-led entrepreneurship, a combination of calculated anarchy and an astute reading of the changing relationship of the artist to the market.

== Gallaccio's installation Tense ==
For her component of the exhibition Anya Gallaccio printed rolls of wallpaper featuring an orange motif, "the paper was pasted on the walls, and on the floor Gallaccio made an oblong 'carpet' comprising one ton of Valencia oranges which gradually decayed over the duration of the show."
