= Richard Patterson (artist) =

English artist

Richard Patterson (born 1963 in Leatherhead, Surrey) is an English artist and one of the Young British Artists (YBAs). He is currently based in Dallas, Texas. Patterson's work is primarily painterly, but occasionally morphs into three-dimensional works as well.

== Education ==
Patterson attended a Watford College of Art and Design Course from 1982 to 1983. He received a B.A. Honors degree in Fine Art from Goldsmiths' (1983–86).

== Solo exhibitions ==
- 1995 "Richard Patterson: Motocrosser", Project Space, Anthony d'Offay Gallery, London, England
- 1997 Anthony d'Offay Gallery, London, England (exhibition catalogue, text by Stuart Morgan)
- 1999 James Cohan Gallery, New York City (exhibition catalogue)
- 2000 "Concentration 35: Richard Patterson", Dallas Museum of Art, Dallas, Texas, USA (exhibition brochure with essay by Suzanne Weaver)
- 2002 James Cohan Gallery, New York City
- 2005 Timothy Taylor Gallery, London
- 2013 Timothy Taylor Gallery, London

== See also ==
- Young British Artists
- Freeze
