= Gary Hume =

English artist

- Born: 9 May 1962 (age 64); Tenterden, Kent, England
- Education: Goldsmiths
- Known for: Painting
- Movement: Young British Artists

Gary Stewart Hume RA (born 9 May 1962) is an English artist. Hume's work is strongly identified with the YBA who came to prominence in the early 1990s. Hume lives and works in London and Accord, New York.

== Life and career ==
Gary Hume Snowman, 1996.

Hume was born in 1962 in Tenterden, Kent. He attended Homewood School. He graduated from Goldsmiths College in 1988. His work was included in both Freeze, an exhibition organised by Damien Hirst in 1988, and East Country Yard, a warehouse exhibition organised by Henry Bond and Sarah Lucas in 1990.

Hume has become known for depicting everyday subjects using high-gloss industrial paints. His earliest notable works are his "door paintings", life-size representations of hospital doors. These proved a critical success, being shown in Germany and the United States, as well as attracting the attention of collector Charles Saatchi. Hume's work was included in the 1995 exhibition Brilliant!, a showcase of work by YBA artists. In 1997, his work was included in Sensation, a touring show of the Charles Saatchi art collection at the Royal Academy, London.

Hume abandoned doors in the mid-1990s, turning to paintings in household gloss paint on aluminium panel, for these often used appropriated images, including pictures of celebrities (e.g. DJ Tony Blackburn) and animals. Their forms and colours are dramatically simplified, with people being reduced to just two or three colours. Snowman (1996), for example, is made up of three shades of red, showing a circle on top of a larger circle against a lighter background. At first, Hume used mainly bright colours, but later pieces have used more muted tones.

Around 2005, Hume revisited his Door pictures, this time anthropomorphising the doors, arranging them into pairs of lovers and giving them the titles The Couple and The Argument. Hume's "Yellow Window", from 2002, broke records when sold at auction at Christie's (which is now selling some other pieces of his work from George Michael's collection). The work inspired a later limited edition entitled "1000 Windows," produced for London's Tate Modern in 2013.

Besides his London studio, Hume maintains a second studio in a converted barn on the grounds of a former chicken farm in New York's Catskill Mountains region.

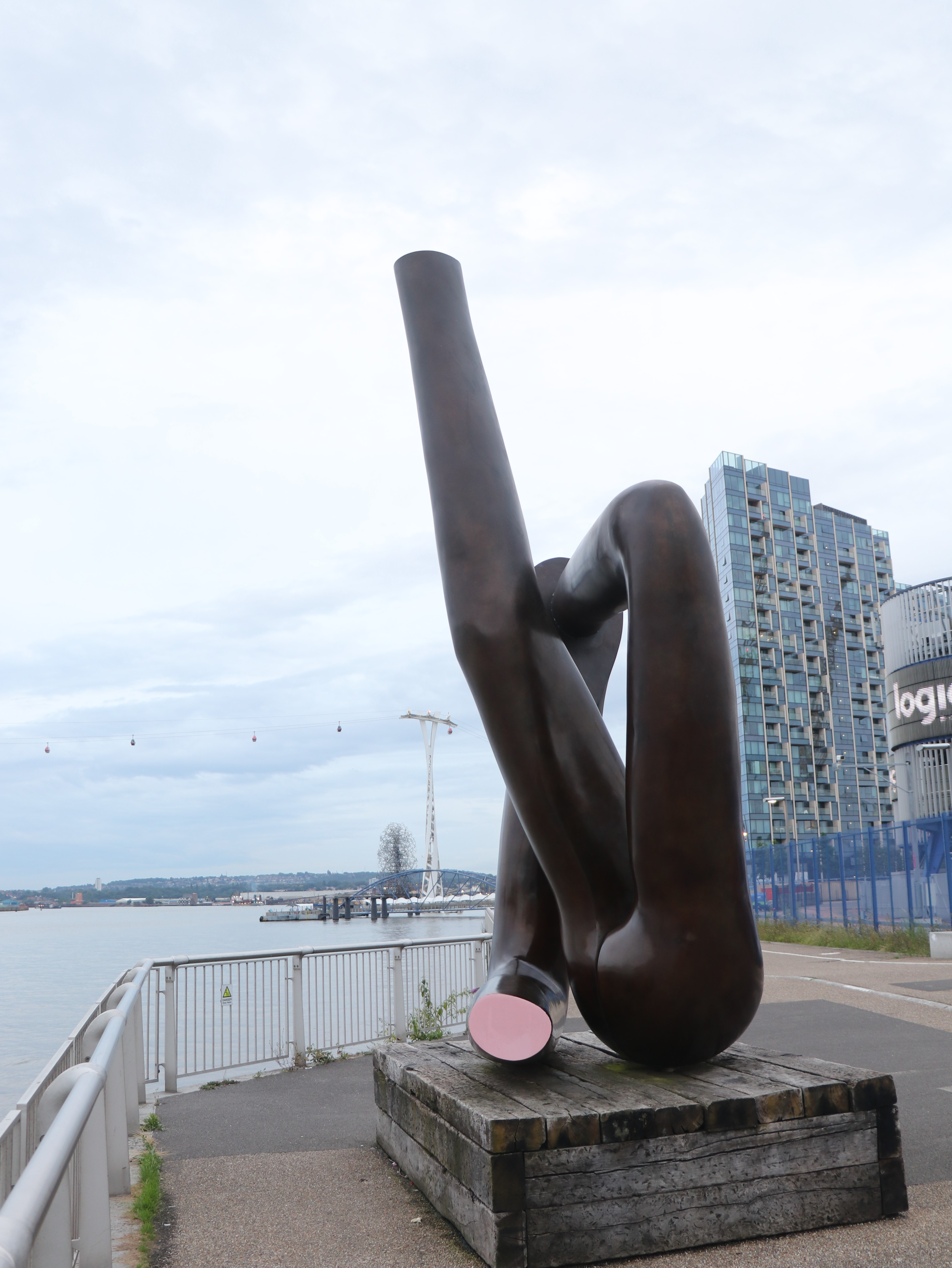
Liberty Grip, at North Greenwich, London, with (to left of cable car pylon), Anthony Gormley's Quantum Cloud, also part of The Line, in the background

Liberty Grip is a 2008 sculpture in bronze by Hume, modelled in three discrete sections using the arm of a mannequin as a template, and exhibited at White Cube gallery in Bermondsey, London in 2013. The sculpture is today situated on a riverside path on the east side of the North Greenwich in south-east London, where it forms part of The Line, a public sculpture trail that very roughly follows the path of the Prime Meridian as it crosses the River Thames.

=== Philosophy and approach to painting ===
In 2012, Hume made an exhibition titled 'Indifferent Owl'. Speaking about his work in 2011, Hume had stated, 'Where I live in New York, there's a wood. I heard an owl in the night. Next day I found one of those "Happy Birthday" balloons caught in the trees. It had almost deflated. I imagined the owl, utterly indifferent, watching the balloon float by as it slowly collapsed. That's how I see life. I'm the owl, totally disengaged as the balloon bobs by...'

Water Painting, 1999, Tate Collection. Part of Hume's "Water" Series of paintings.

== Exhibitions ==
Hume represented Great Britain at the 1999 Venice Biennale, where he showed his Water series, a number of superimposed line drawings of women (again, these were gloss paint on aluminium). His work was the subject of a one-person exhibition at Whitechapel Gallery, London, in 1999. Later monographic shows of Hume's work were organised at the Kestnergesellschaft, Hannover, and the Kunsthaus Bregenz, Austria, in 2004, and Modern Art Oxford mounted a survey show of his Door paintings in 2008.

== Recognition ==
In 1996, Hume was nominated for the Turner Prize, but lost out to Douglas Gordon. He was later awarded Great Britain's 1997 Jerwood Painting Prize. Hume was elected a Royal Academician in 2001.
