= Freeze (art exhibition) =

Art exhibition

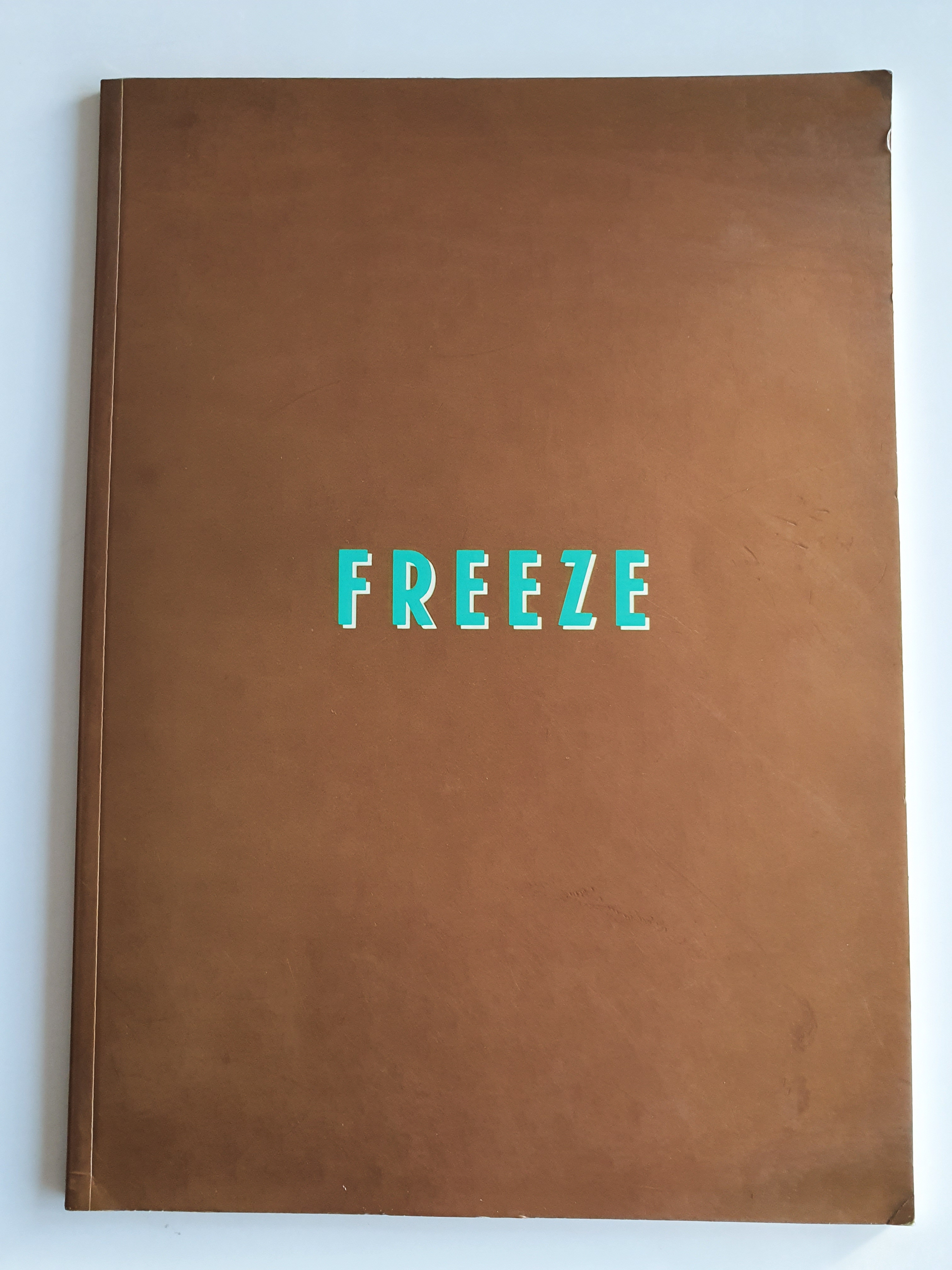
Freeze Exhibition Catalogue

Freeze is the title of an art exhibition that took place in July 1988 in an empty London Port Authority building (the old fire station) at Surrey Docks in London Docklands. Its main organiser was Damien Hirst. It was significant in the subsequent development of the Young British Artists.

== Organisation ==
Damien Hirst was the organizer of Freeze.

Freeze was orchestrated by Damien Hirst, who was then a student at Goldsmiths College of Art. He was assisted by Luigi Scalera, a young architecture graduate working for the London Docklands Development Corporation, who identified and made available the derelict building for the exhibition together with modest funding for painting the interior. Hirst and his collaborators intentionally imitated the look of Charles Saatchi's first gallery in St John's Wood that had opened a few years earlier. Saatchi, an art collector, attended Freeze and purchased a piece of art by Mat Collishaw. Michael Craig-Martin, a tutor at Goldsmiths Art College, used his influence in the London art world to convince Norman Rosenthal and Nicholas Serota to visit the exhibition.

A show of work by Angus Fairhurst in February 1988 was the precursor to Freeze. Fairhurst, along with other students from Goldsmiths College of Art, were instrumental in organizing Freeze. It was there that the work of the Young British Artists caught the attention of the collector Charles Saatchi.

The catalogue for Freeze had surprisingly high production values for a student exhibition. It was designed by Tony Arefin and included an essay by art critic Ian Jeffrey. The catalogue was funded by the property developers Olympia and York. The title of the show came from the catalogue's description of Mat Collishaw's macro photograph Bullet Hole which showed a gunshot wound to a human head (taken from a pathology textbook).

In 2007, Michael Craig-Martin said in an interview with Brian Sherwin:

I had always tried to help my students in any way I could, particularly in those first years after art school. I knew from personal experience how difficult it was—I never had things come easy. I did the same with Damien and Freeze. I encouraged people to go and see the work. I would never have done this if I hadn't believed the show was of exceptional interest—why waste people's time? It amuses me that so many people think what happened was calculated and cleverly manipulated whereas in fact it was a combination of youthful bravado, innocence, fortunate timing, good luck, and, of course, good work.

The exhibition was sponsored by the London Docklands Development Corporation and Olympia and York.

== Legacy ==
There was one contemporary review of the original exhibition written by Sacha Craddock, which appeared in The Guardian.

The success inspired a second exhibition several months later, Freeze 2, featuring some artists from the first exhibition and some new faces from other London art schools. The BBC filmed the exhibition and interviewed some contributors.

Freeze influenced a group of artists later to be identified as the Young British Artists (YBAs—often written yBas). The actual list of members in this art group remained fluid from project to project.

== Exhibitors ==
Two younger artists turned down the chance to be in the exhibition. Dominic Denis was listed in catalogue but did not show work. The 16 students who did exhibit at Freeze were:

- Steven Adamson
- Angela Bulloch
- Mat Collishaw
- Ian Davenport
- Angus Fairhurst
- Anya Gallaccio
- Damien Hirst
- Gary Hume
- Michael Landy
- Abigail Lane
- Sarah Lucas
- Lala Meredith-Vula
- Richard Patterson
- Simon Patterson
- Stephen Park
- Fiona Rae
