= Angus Fairhurst =

English artist (1966–2008)

- Angus Fairhurst
- Born: 4 October 1966; Pembury, Kent, England
- Died: 29 March 2008 (aged 41); Bridge of Orchy, Scotland
- Education: Canterbury Art College, Goldsmiths, University of London
- Known for: Conceptual art, sculpture
- Movement: Young British Artists

Angus Fairhurst (4 October 1966 – 29 March 2008) was an English artist working in installation, photography and video. He was one of the Young British Artists (YBAs).

== Life and work ==
Fairhurst's Man Abandoned by Colour (1991)

Angus Fairhurst was born in Pembury, Kent. Having attended The Judd School between 1978 and 1985, he studied at Canterbury Art College 1985–1986, and graduated in 1989 in Fine Art at Goldsmiths College, where he was in the same year as Damien Hirst. In February 1988, Fairhurst organised a show of student work, which was a precursor to the Freeze show largely organised by Hirst in July 1988 with sixteen other students from Goldsmith, including Fairhurst. Fairhurst and Hirst became close friends and collaborated on many projects. Fairhurst was also for several years the partner and sometime-collaborator of Sarah Lucas.

Fairhurst's work was often characterised by visual distortion and practical jokes. An example is his drawing of a gorilla holding a fish under its oxter and both staring at a plate of chips.

He worked in different media, including video, photography and painting, and is noted for sculptures of gorillas.

A Couple of Differences Between Thinking and Feeling II, 2003, by Angus Fairhurst

Angus Fairhurst exhibited nationally and internationally after graduating from Goldsmiths. Exhibitions include Freeze and Some Went Mad and Some Ran Away, Brilliant! at the Walker Art Center and Apocalypse at the Royal Academy in 2000. A 2004 exhibition In-A-Gadda-Da-Vida, was held at the Tate Gallery with Hirst and Lucas.

== Gallery Connections ==
In 1991, he did a piece in which he networked together the telephones of leading contemporary art dealers in London so that they could only talk to each other. They were confused by what they perceived were crossed lines and were concerned that the Inland Revenue was investigating VAT fraud. The full transcript of Gallery Connections is available online. The work is now in the collection of the Tate. Occasionally, Gallery Connections is on display at Tate Britain and may be listened to. One gallery gives its phone number and listeners have been known to call them.

== Underdone/Overdone Paintings ==
One of his late works is a series of silk-screens called Underdone/Overdone Paintings, made in 1998. It consists of thirty paintings, acrylic silk-screen on panels, largely 90 x 60 cm, which were initially displayed in The Missing Link exhibition (1998) in the Sadie Coles HQ Gallery in London. The paintings depict abstract forms of a primeval forest with trees, coloured in the three primary colours. These were laid in varied combinations over each other at random over a sequence of thirty pictures. Fairhurst's work embodies an antithesis between the accumulation of forms and the reduction into formlessness. A similar technique of repetition and layering can be found in the Low, Lower and Lowest Expectations series (1996 – 1997).

== Death ==
Fairhurst exhibited at Sadie Coles HQ in London. On 29 March 2008, the final day of his third solo show at the gallery, he was found hanging from a tree in a remote Highland woodland near Bridge of Orchy in Scotland, having taken his own life. He is survived by his mother and brother.

Following his death, Sir Nicholas Serota, director of the Tate gallery, said:

Angus Fairhurst was always deprecating about his own talent, but he made some of the most engaging, witty and perceptive works of his generation and was an enormously influential friend of other British artists who came to prominence in the early nineties.

== Literature ==
- Angus Fairhurst, Sacha Craddock, James Cahill (foreword by Nicholas Serota), (London: Philip Wilson Publishers, 2009)
