= Sarah Lucas =

English artist

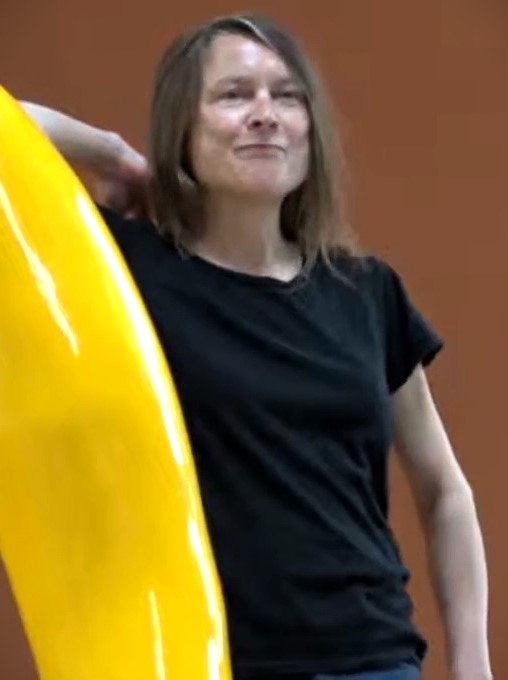
- Lucas in 2015
- Born: 23 October 1962 (age 64); Holloway, London
- Known for: Sculpture
- Movement: Young British Artists

Sarah Lucas (born 1962) is an English artist. She is part of the generation of Young British Artists who emerged in 1988. Her works frequently employ visual puns and bawdy humour by incorporating photography, sculpture, collage and found objects.

== Early life ==
Sarah Lucas was born in London, England in 1962 to a milkman father and a part-time gardener and cleaner mother, who she says had "absolutely no ambition." She grew up on an estate in Holloway, north London, though she frequently accompanied her parents to other homes to "ogle the furniture." She became pregnant at 17 after leaving school at 16 and had an abortion, then deciding to hitchhike around Europe in search of a direction for her life.

== Education ==
Lucas left school at 16, returning to study art at The Working Men's College (1982–83), London College of Printing (1983–84), and Goldsmiths College (1984–87), graduating with a degree in Fine Art in 1987.

== Career ==
Lucas was included in the 1988 group exhibition Freeze along with contemporary artists including Angus Fairhurst, Damien Hirst, and Gary Hume. In 1990, Lucas co-organized the East Country Yard Show with Henry Bond, in which she also exhibited. Her first two solo exhibitions in 1992 were titled The Whole Joke and Penis Nailed to a Board. It was in the early 1990s when Lucas began using furniture as a substitute for the human body, usually with crude genital punning. Created for a show organized by fellow artist Georg Herold at Portikus, Au Naturel (1994) is an assemblage of objects—a mattress, a bucket, a pair of melons, oranges and a cucumber—that suggest male and female body parts. For six months in 1993, Lucas and fellow artist Tracey Emin rented a retail space in east London, The Shop, where they made artworks, ranging from printed mugs to T-shirts with slogans, and put them on sale. In works such as Bitch (table, T-shirt, melons, and vacuum-packed smoked fish, 1995), she merges tabloid culture with the economy of the ready-made. In earlier work, she had displayed enlarged pages from the Sunday Sport newspaper. Through her career, Lucas has continued to appropriate everyday materials (including, for example, freshly made fried eggs) to make works that use humour, visual puns and sexual metaphors of sex, death, Englishness and gender.

Sarah Lucas. “Self-Portrait with Fried Eggs” from Self-Portraits 1990 – 1998 (1999)

Sarah Lucas is also known for her 'Artist as Subject' approach where she produced a series of self-portraits, such as Human Toilet Revisited, 1998, a colour photograph in which she sits on a toilet smoking a cigarette. In her solo exhibition The Fag Show at Sadie Coles in 2000, she used cigarettes as a material, as in Self-portrait with Cigarettes (2000). And in 2001, Sarah Lucas used Neon tubes for her artwork 'New Religion' in which a transparent coffin has been lit up violet. It was later acquired by George Michael in 2004.

Lucas' 2006 sculpture of a life-size bronze horse and cart, Perceval, is situated in Compton Verney, Warwickshire.

Writing in The Guardian, in 2011, Aida Edemariam said that "Lucas was the wildest of the Young British Artists, partying hard and making art that was provocative and at times genuinely shocking". In 1996, she was the subject of a BBC documentary, Two Melons and a Stinking Fish.

=== Exhibitions ===
Lucas had her first solo exhibition in 1992 at City Racing, an artist-run gallery in south London, and her first solo show in New York at the Barbara Gladstone Gallery in 1995. One-person museum exhibitions at Museum Boijmans-van Beuningen in Rotterdam, at Portikus in Frankfurt, at Museum Ludwig in Cologne and at Kunsthalle Zürich, Kunstverein in Hamburg and Tate Liverpool have accompanied exhibitions in less conventional spaces—an empty office building for The Law in 1997, a disused postal depot in Berlin for the exhibition Beautiness in 1999, and an installation at the Freud Museum called Beyond the Pleasure Principle in 2000.

Lucas's work has been included in major surveys of new British art in the last decade including Brilliant!—New Art From London at the Walker Art Center, Minneapolis, in 1995, Sensation (Young British Artists from the Saatchi Collection at the Royal Academy in 1997), and Intelligence—New British Art, 2000, at Tate Britain. In 2003, Sarah Lucas participated in the 50th International Biennale of Art in Venice, Outlook: Contemporary Art in Athens, and In-A-Gadda-Da-Vida, a three-person exhibition for Tate Britain with Angus Fairhurst and Damien Hirst in 2004. From October 2005 to January 2006, Tate Liverpool presented the first survey exhibition of Lucas's work.

In 2012, Lucas curated Free, an exhibition at the Southbank Centre by the Koestler Trust. The annual exhibition displays artworks by prisoners, detainees and ex-offenders. The theme was '50', to acknowledge the 50th anniversary of Koestler Trust and Lucas was 50 years old at the time.

In 2013, the Whitechapel Gallery in East London hosted a retrospective of Lucas' work. Tabish Khan writing for Londonist said about the exhibition: “Though it's the sexually charged art that dominates this exhibition, Lucas is at her most powerful when exercising restraint and subtlety”.

In 2015, Sarah Lucas represented Britain at the 56th Venice Biennale with I SCREAM DADDIO. She was interviewed by close friend Don Brown during the installation of the exhibition.

In 2017, the Legion of Honor, San Francisco exhibited Sarah Lucas: Good Muse. The exhibit was created to accompany Auguste Rodin: The Centenary Installation; the Museum “invited Lucas to bring a contemporary perspective to our understanding and appreciation of Rodin.”

In September 2018, The New Museum presented the first American survey of Lucas' work in the exhibition "Sarah Lucas: Au Naturel". Lucas has also created new sculptural works for the exhibition, including This Jaguar's Going to Heaven (2018), a severed 2003 Jaguar X-Type—the car's back half burned and its front half collaged with cigarettes—and VOX POP DORIS (2018), a pair of eleven-foot-tall thigh-high platform boots cast in concrete. The exhibition traveled to the Hammer Museum in Los Angeles in June 2019.

The National Gallery of Australia's 2021–22 Know My Name Exhibition Part Two features the work Installation of Project 1: Sarah Lucas, as well as her first self-portraits, Eating a Banana.

Numerous works by Lucas featured in the exhibition Big Women at the Firstsite gallery in Colchester in the UK in Spring 2023. In September 2023, an exhibition of her work opened at the Tate Britain. Writing about the Tate Britain exhibition for Culture Whisper, Tabish Khan, described the show as “It’s a show that’s playful, sexually charged and at times extremely dark".

In 2024, the Kunsthalle Mannheim shows a solo exhibition of her works, curated by Luisa Heese.

In 2025, Kiasma in Helsinki, Finland ran a solo-exhibition Naked Eye. The exhibition features a large collection of her works from the past four decades including sculptures, photography, and installations. This is her debut exhibition in Nordics. She's interviewed for Helsingin Sanomat which describes the art as follows: “In Sarah Lucas’s works, crudeness and sensitivity are not mutually exclusive.”

=== Feminist interpretation ===
Lucas frequently employs a critical humour in her work in order to question conventions and highlight the absurdity of the everyday. One of Lucas' most famous works, Two Fried Eggs and Kebab, parodies the traditional still life and evokes similarities between itself and feminist Judy Chicago's infamous piece The Dinner Party. Feminist reviews often describe Lucas as attempting to add female artists into the canon of art history through her analytical work that predominantly discusses the female body and voyeurism.

Lucas frequently appropriates masculine constructions to confront and dissect their nature. Her pieces represent a fantastical world and playfully employ unrealistic ideals to unearth obscene paradoxes created by those very constructions. Specifically, she is concerned with the casual misogyny of everyday life and employs the conventions of middle-class or 'street' language to enact her concepts. Her appropriation of masculine symbols such as the phallic banana or 'fried eggs' in conjunction with her fearless and dominating gaze, takes 'female work' out of the feminine sphere and disrupts the patriarchal power dynamic of the gaze. Works such as The old in Out (1988) are a reference to Marcel Duchamp's Fountain (1917) and Two Fried Eggs and Kebab (1992) has been linked to Édouard Manet's Olympia (1863). While Lucas continues the artistic legacy of feminist artists such as Hannah Wilke, Cindy Sherman, and Rachel Whiteread, her visual language empties femininity of meaning and thus removes her from such a clear 'feminist art' title.

Sexuality is not apparent in her works and a lack of association with morality leaves viewers at the free will of her humorous narratives. Lucas takes on the role as a source of reflecting sexism, but not overtly commenting on it. She has stated that, "I am not trying to solve the problem. I'm exploring the moral dilemma by incorporating it". Her works are both literal and conceptual evidence of Lucas searching for meaning. Whether it is through recognizable forms or her own mythologized fantasies, her ideas constantly build and transform. She appears to never be satisfied with her outcome and scours every imaginable medium for an outlet that is fitting. To her, the artworks she makes “...carry on talking and thinking with other people". Lucas's practice is then not compulsive ramblings or automatic depictions, but a conscious yearning for a personal sense of happiness.

=== Young British Artists ===
Young British Artists (YBAs), also known as the Brit artists or the Britart, are a group of British artists who in 1988 began to exhibit together. The group was organized by Damien Hirst and includes Angus Fairhurst, Michael Landy, Christine Borland, Tracey Emin, Cornelia Parker, and Gary Hume. The group became famous for their openness to materials and processes, shock tactics and entrepreneurial attitude. Their first exhibition Freeze included the work of Damien Hirst, Sarah Lucas, Angus Fairhurst, and Michael Landy while they were all still students at Goldsmiths College of Art. The term "Young British Artists" was coined in May 1992 by Michael Corris in Artforum. The acronym YBA wasn't created until 1996 when it was published in Art Monthly magazine. The terms became the brand for the group and showcased the "can do" spirit their art entailed.

== Gallery representation ==
Lucas is represented by Sadie Coles HQ, London, Barbara Gladstone, New York, and Contemporary Fine Arts, Berlin (CFA).

== Personal life ==
Lucas now lives with her partner Julian Simmons, in the former residence of Benjamin Britten near Aldeburgh; a home which is "tucked away down a long country lane, behind a Baptist church in Suffolk." In August 2014, Lucas was one of 200 public figures who were signatories to a letter to The Guardian opposing Scottish independence in the run-up to September's referendum on that issue.
