= Michael Sandle =

British sculptor and artist (born 1936)

- Born: 18 May 1936 (age 89); Weymouth, Dorset, England
- Education: Douglas School of Art and Technology; Chester College of Art; Slade School of Fine Art

Michael Sandle RA (born 18 May 1936) is a British sculptor and artist. His works include several public sculptures, many relating to themes of war, death, or destruction.

== Early and private life ==
Michael Sandle was born in Weymouth, Dorset. His father was serving in the Royal Navy, and he was christened on HMS Ark Royal. His family's home in Plymouth was bombed in the Second World War, and he grew up on the Isle of Man, where his father had been stationed in 1942. From 1951 to 1954, he studied at Douglas School of Art and Technology on the Isle of Man, and was then conscripted for two years' National Service in the Royal Artillery.

== Art career ==
After attending evening classes at Chester College of Art, he studied printmaking in London at the Slade School of Fine Art from 1956 to 1959, where he was taught etching by Anthony Gross, Lynton Lamb, and Ceri Richards. He was also taught by Andrew Forge, Lucian Freud, and Claude Rogers. After travelling to Italy and Paris, Sandle taught at various British art schools in the 1960s. Originally a painter and draughtsman, in the 1960s, he gravitated towards sculpture.

From 1970 to 1973, Sandle lived in Canada, where he was a visiting associate professor at the University of Calgary until 1971 and at the University of British Columbia from 1971 to 1972. In 1973, he moved to Germany, and taught in Pforzheim and Berlin. He became professor of sculpture at the Akademie der Bildenden Künste in Karlsruhe in 1980. From 1976 to 1982, Sandle was a member of the faculty of engraving at the British School in Rome. In 1982, he was elected an Associate of the Royal Academy, and in 1989 a full academician. After moving to Devon, he returned to London in 2003.

=== Works ===
Two of Sandle's smaller sculptural works—described as "anti-memorial"—are held by the Tate Gallery: "A Twentieth Century Memorial" (1971–1978) (originally entitled "A Mickey-Mouse Machine-Gun Monument for Amerika") and one of the five casts of his work "Der Trommler" ("the drummer") (1985, cast 1987).

His public works include:

- a memorial (1985) to the victims of the 1982 Mannheim helicopter crash
- a large bronze statue of St George and the Dragon (1987–88) for a public square in Dorset Rise, London
- the International Seafarers' Memorial (2001), outside the headquarters of the International Maritime Organization on the Albert Embankment in London
- decorative plaques for a new building, La Colomberie in Saint Helier, under the Percent for Art scheme
- the Siege Bell Memorial (1989–1993), at the entrance to the Grand Harbour in Valletta, Malta, for which he was awarded the Henry Hering Memorial Medal by the US National Sculpture Society. The Siege Bell Memorial includes a thirteen-tonne bronze bell, "Santa Maria", one of the largest ever forged, which rings for two minutes every midday.

Sandle also worked on an unrealised project for the Battle of Britain Monument with Theo Crosby and Pedro Guedes in 1987. The plans for the 500 ft monument near Surrey Docks include a hollow pyramid containing laser-generated holograms and sounds recalling the Blitz, topped by sculptures of a Heinkel bomber and a Spitfire.

He has exhibited at the 5th Paris Biennale, the Sao Paulo Biennial, and the 4th and 6th Documenta in Kassel. Examples of his work are held by the Tate Gallery in London, the Metropolitan Museum of Art in New York, the Australian National Gallery in Canberra, the Hakone Museum in Hakone, Japan, and the British Museum. A major retrospective of his work was held at the Whitechapel Art Gallery in 1988 and then at the Wurttembergischer Kunstverein in Stuttgart in 1989.

Sandle designed the Belgrano Medal in 1986, which shows Margaret Thatcher, with the inscription "Imperatrix Impudens" ("Shameless Empress").

He has been the recipient of a number of awards, including:

- Abbey Travel Award
- French State Scholarship
- Rodin Grand Prize, Japan's most prestigious contemporary art award, in 1986, Nobutaka Shikanai Prize, Japan
- Major Prize 7th International Sculpture Exhibition, Hungary
- DAAD Research Grant.

He was a selector for The Threadneedle Prize for painting and sculpture in 2010.

Sandle was elected a member of the Royal Academy in 1989, and became a Fellow of the Royal Society of British Sculptors in 1994. He resigned from the Royal Academy in 1997 in protest at the Sensation exhibition and the inclusion of Marcus Harvey's painting Myra, but rejoined in 2005.

He won the Hugh Casson Drawing Prize for his Iraq Triptych, a drawing showing Tony and Cherie Blair naked, exhibited at the Royal Academy Summer Exhibition in 2007.

== Public commissions ==
- 1981: "Sculpture for a Trades School", Mühlacker, Germany
- 1985: "Memorial to the Victims of a Helicopter Disaster", Mannheim, Germany (commemorating the victims killed when a US Army CH-47 crashed during the city's Aeronautical Days on 11 September 1982)
- 1986: "Belgrano Medal—a Medal of Dishonour", British Art Medallic Society
- 1988-92: Malta Siege Memorial, Grand Harbour, Valletta
- 1987: "Woman for Heidelberg", Kopf Klinik, Heidelberg, Germany
- 1988: St. George & the Dragon, Blackfriars, London
- 1992: "St Margaret", The Pearl Assurance Head Offices, Peterborough
- 1997: "The Viking", Port Erin Arts Centre, Isle of Man
- 2001: International Maritime Organization Seafarers' Memorial, Albert Embankment, London
- 2002: Memorial to Lifeboatmen, Marine Gardens, Douglas, Isle of Man

== Awards ==
- 1986: Nobutaka Shikanai prize, 1st Rodin Grand Prize Exhibition, Utsukushi-gahara Open Air Museum, Japan
- 1987: Prize winner in the 7th International Small Sculpture Exhibition, Budapest, Hungary
- 1989: Korn/Ferry Award, Royal Academy of Arts Summer Exhibition
- 1995: Henry Hering Memorial Medal (for Malta Siege Memorial) National Sculpture Society of America
- 2004–2006: Kenneth Armitage Fellowship
- 2007: Hugh Casson Drawing Prize, Royal Academy of Arts Summer Exhibition

== Gallery ==
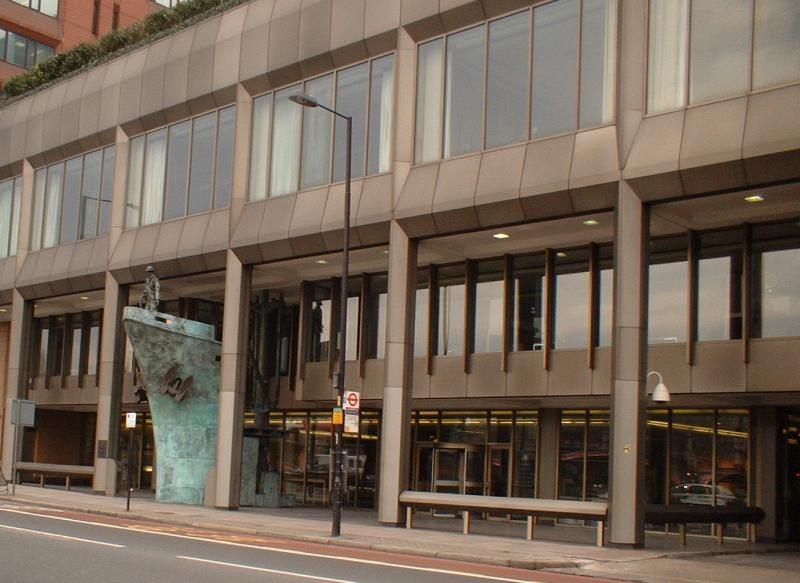
International Maritime Organization Seafarers' Memorial, Albert Embankment, London

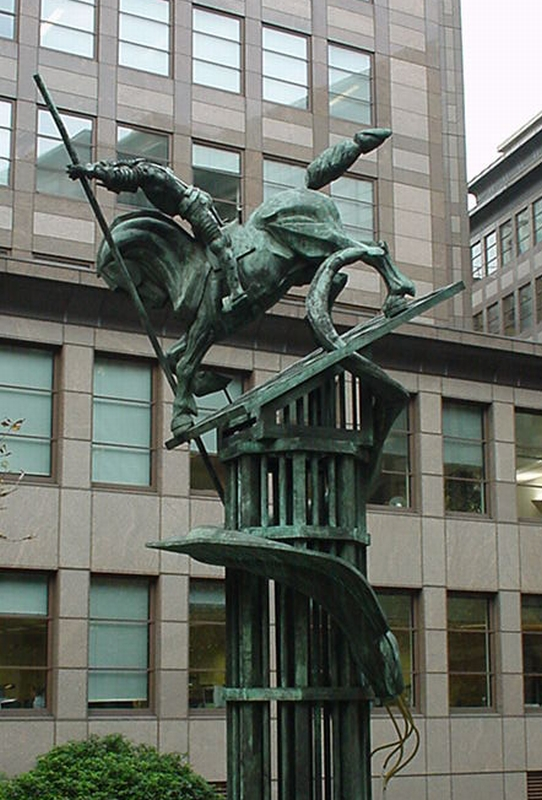
St George and the Dragon, Dorset Rise, London

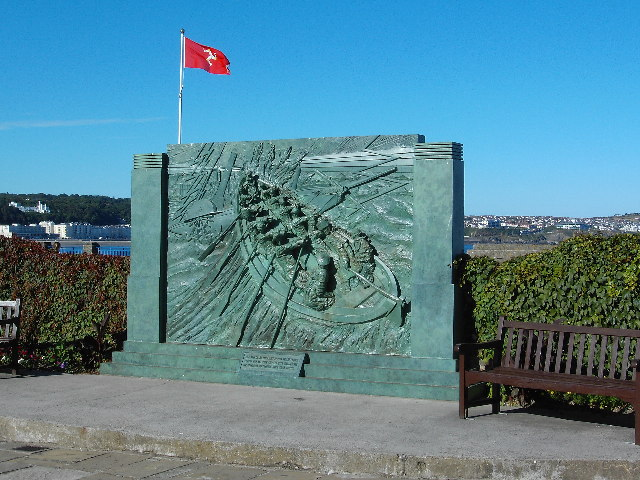
Monument to Sir William Hillary, Douglas Promenade, Isle of Man

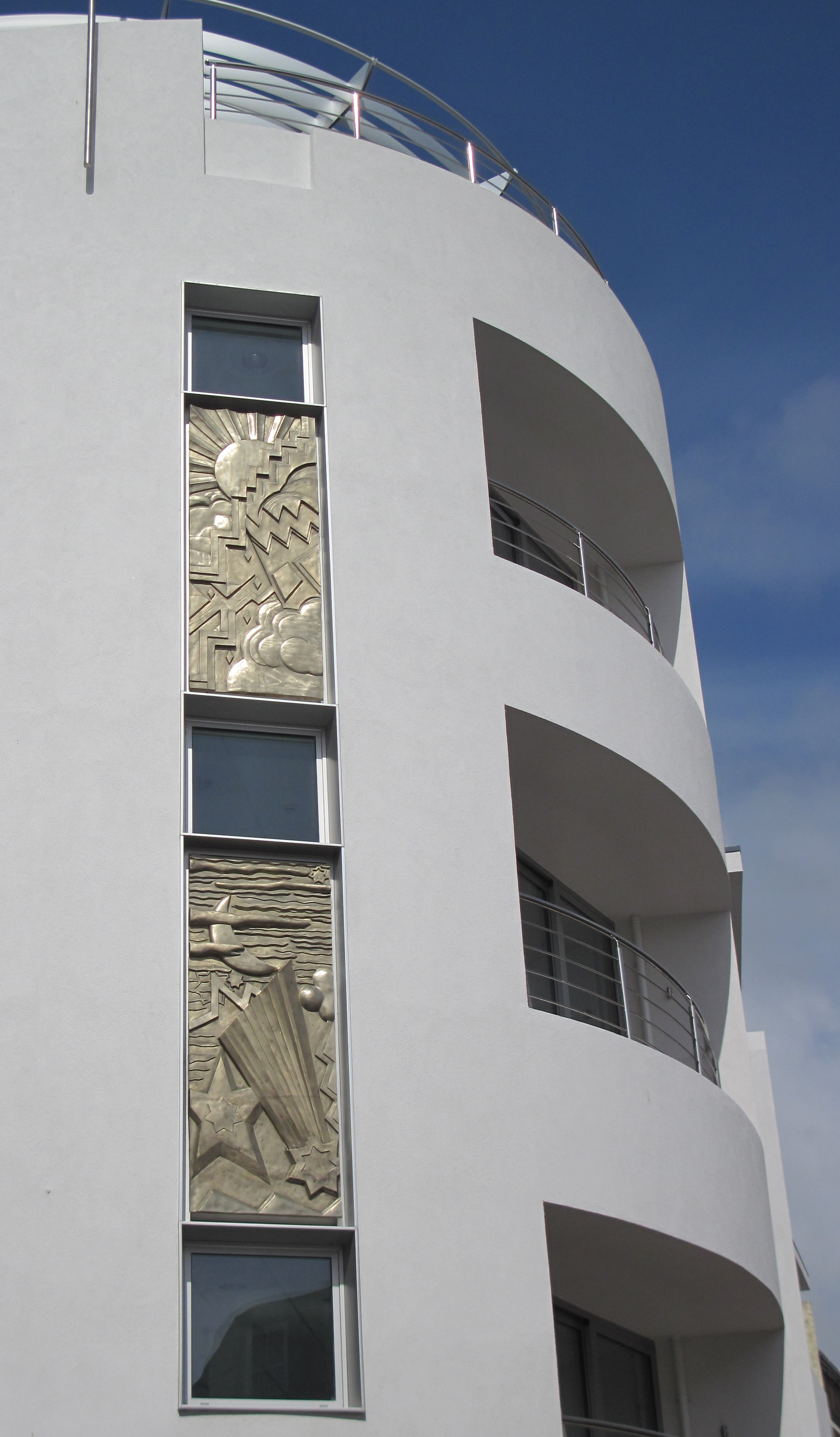
La Colomberie, Saint Helier, Jersey

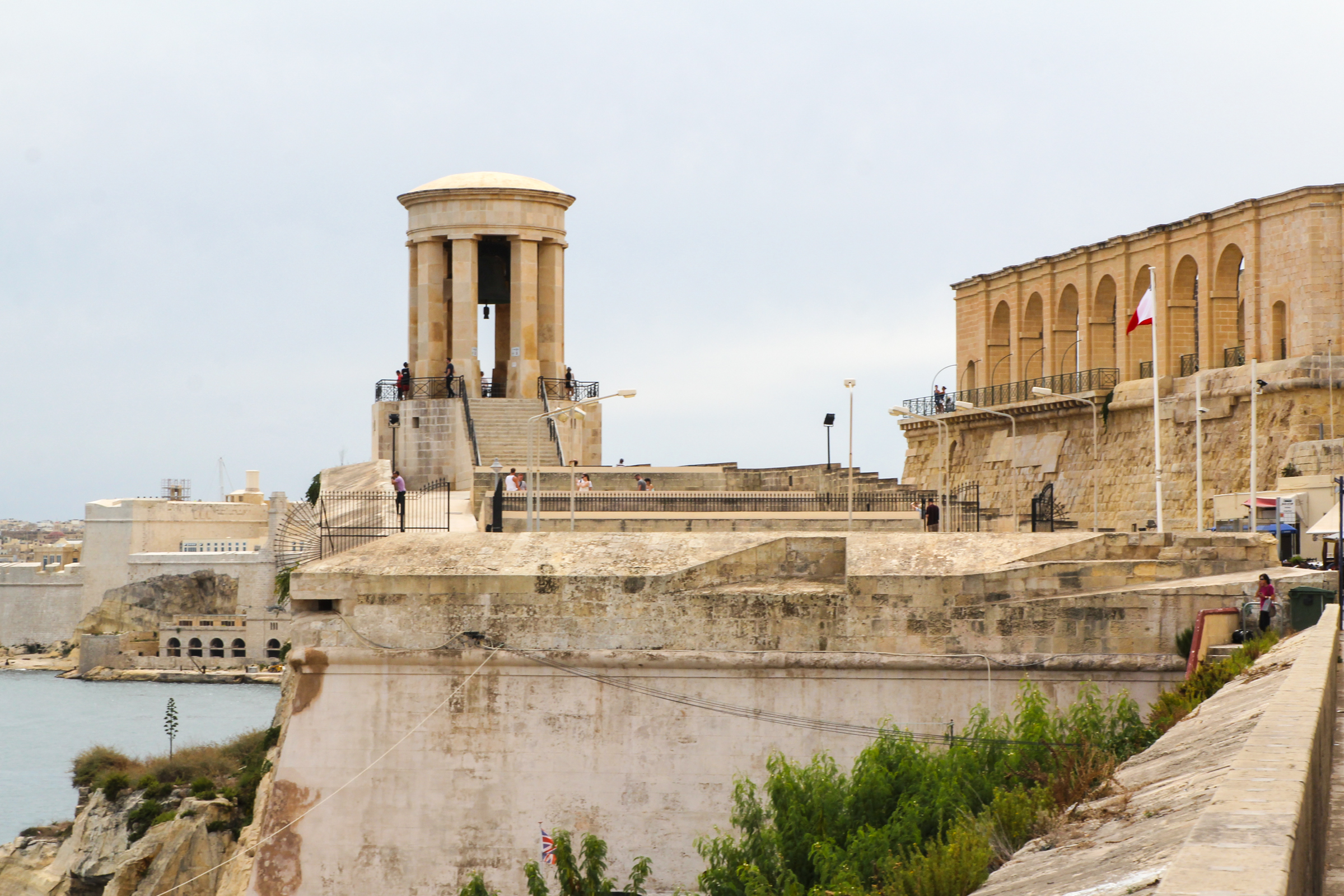
Siege Bell War Memorial, Valletta, Malta

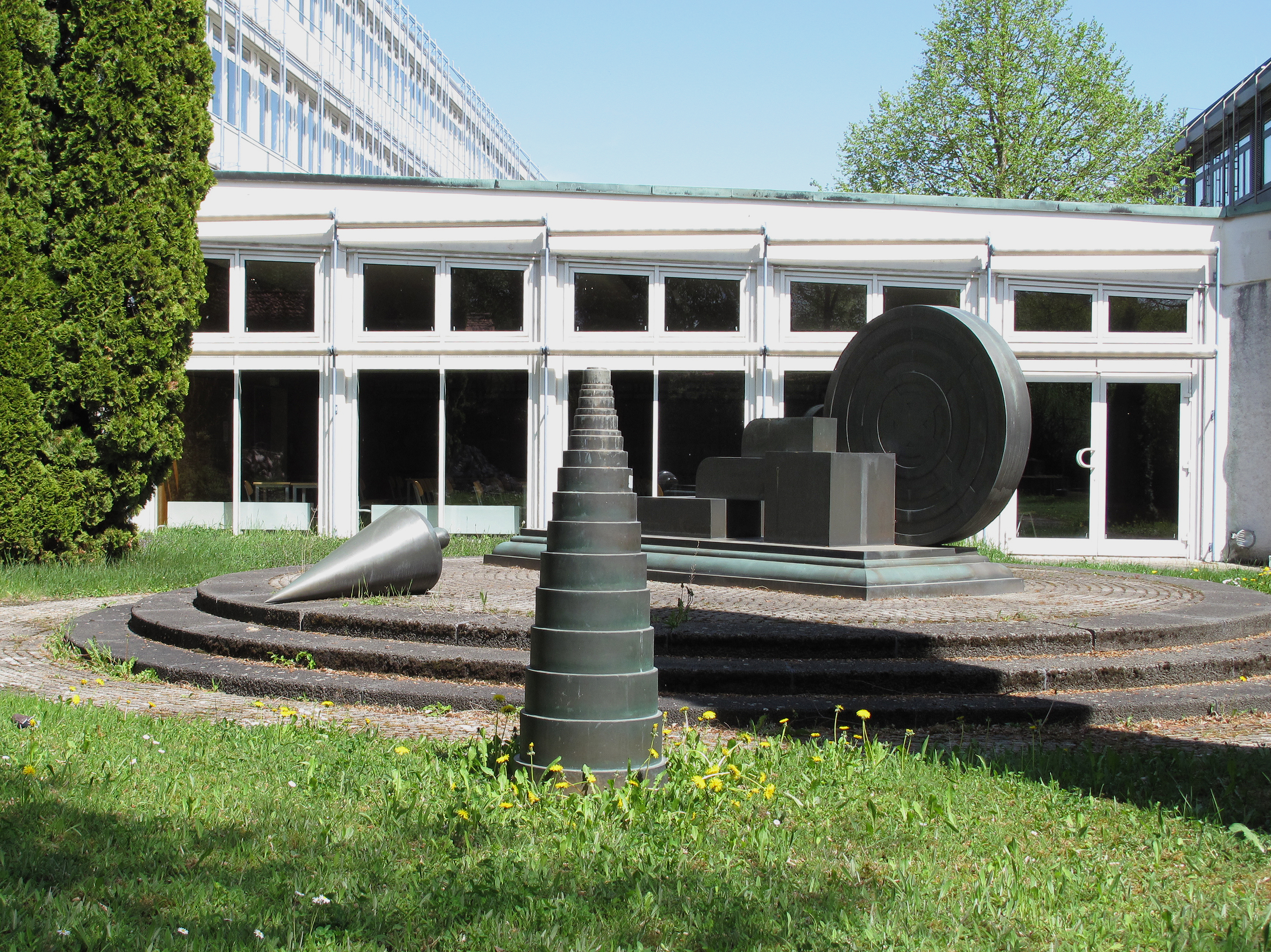
Environment, Georg-Kerschensteiner-Schule, Mühlacker, Germany
