= 1982 Mannheim helicopter crash =

1982 helicopter crash in Mannheim, Germany

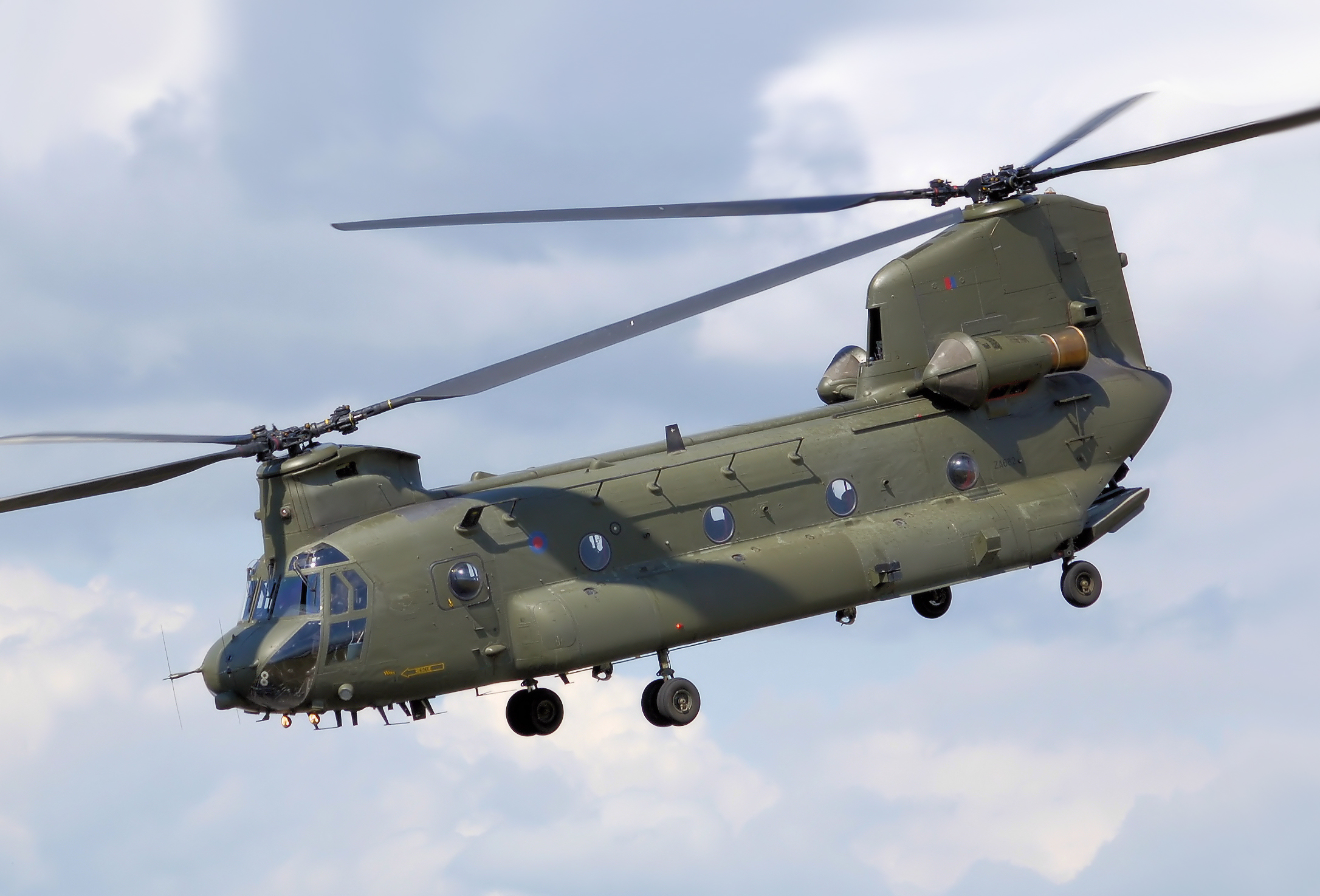
- A CH-47 Chinook similar to the one involved

Accident
- Date: 11 September 1982
- Summary: Rotor blade collision following gearbox failure
- Site: Bundesautobahn 656 near Mannheim-Neckarau, West Germany; 49.468175°N 8.516116°E

Aircraft
- Aircraft type: Boeing-Vertol CH-47C Chinook
- Operator: United States Army
- Registration: 74-22292
- Flight origin: Mannheim City Airport
- Destination: Mannheim City Airport
- Occupants: 46
- Passengers: 41
- Crew: 5
- Fatalities: 46
- Survivors: 0

On 11 September 1982, a United States Army Boeing-Vertol CH-47C Chinook crashed near the Bundesautobahn 656 at the Mannheim-Neckarau interchange in Mannheim, West Germany. All 46 people on board were killed when the helicopter crashed onto the motorway.

== Accident ==
=== Background ===
The crash occurred during preparations for the 375th anniversary celebrations of the granting of city rights to Mannheim. As part of the festivities, the “International Parachuting Days” were to be held at Mannheim City Airport in Mannheim-Neuostheim. Parachutists from Mannheim and its twin cities, including Toulon and Swansea, planned a record formation jump.

A rehearsal jump from approximately 3,500 metres was scheduled before the main event. At around 12:30 pm, the transport helicopter of the US garrison in Mannheim took off carrying the parachutists and crew.

=== Crash ===
Shortly after takeoff, at an altitude of about 3,000 metres, the pilot reported technical problems and announced a return to the airfield. During descent, at approximately 250 metres altitude, the transmission gearbox failed. This gearbox synchronised the movement of the helicopter’s two counter-rotating rotors, whose blade arcs overlapped.

As a result of the failure, the rotor blades collided with each other and disintegrated. The helicopter lost lift and crashed onto the Bundesautobahn 656 in view of spectators, where it burst into flames. All occupants were killed, including 23 French, nine British, six German, and eight American nationals, among them the five crew members and two reporters from the American Forces Network.

== Aftermath ==
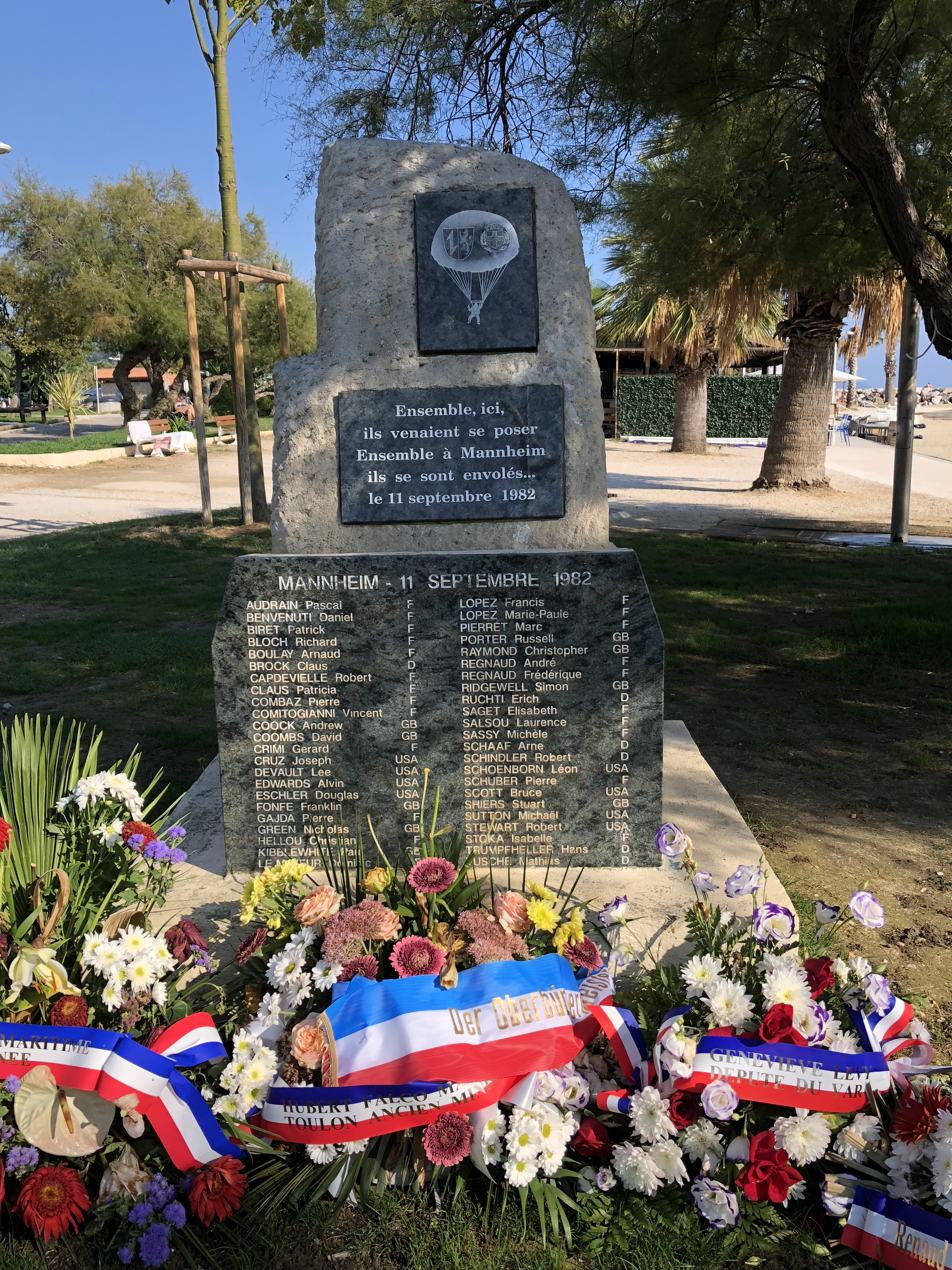
Memorial in Toulon honoring the paratroopers who died in the accident

Following the accident, Mannheim’s mayor Wilhelm Varnholt cancelled all anniversary celebrations. The United States Army grounded all 409 Chinook helicopters worldwide pending investigation. The wreckage was transported to a military facility in Corpus Christi, Texas for analysis.

Investigators determined that particles from a cleaning agent made of crushed walnut shells had clogged lubrication nozzles in the gearbox, leading to overheating and failure. This caused the loss of rotor synchronisation and ultimately the mid-air collision of the rotor blades.

Relatives of nine victims filed lawsuits against the manufacturer Boeing Vertol. A district court initially ruled against the company, citing a design flaw. However, on appeal, Boeing Vertol demonstrated that a proposed design modification had been rejected by the army.

== Memorials ==
One year after the crash, a memorial created by British sculptor Michael Sandle was unveiled at the entrance to Mannheim City Airport. Additional memorials were erected in Toulon, one of Mannheim’s twin cities, where the victims are still commemorated regularly.

== See also ==
- List of accidents and incidents involving helicopters
