= Myra (painting) =

1995 painting by Marcus Harvey

- Artist: Marcus Harvey
- Year: 1995
- Medium: Abstract Photorealism
- Movement: Contemporalism
- Subject: Painting; Modernistic form Conceptual

Myra is a 1995 large painting created by Marcus Harvey which is a reproduction of the mugshot of Myra Hindley shortly after she was arrested for her participation in the Moors murders. It was displayed at the Sensation exhibition of Young British Artists at the Royal Academy of Art in London from 8 September to 28 December 1997.

== Composition ==
The work measures 9 by 11 feet (2.7 by 3.4 m). At first sight, it resembles a greatly magnified version of a black and white photograph printed in a newspaper. It was made using casts of an infant's hand to build up a mosaic of black, grey and white handprints, creating a reproduction of the iconic police photograph of a hard-faced Myra Hindley with bouffant peroxide blonde hair taken after her arrest in 1965 (although often reported to have been taken around the time of the trial of the Moors murders in 1966). The photograph is widely recognised in Britain, having been published in British newspapers in the decades after Hindley's conviction. Harvey has said, "The whole point of the painting is the photograph. That photograph. The iconic power that has come to it as a result of years of obsessive media reproduction." The painting consciously juxtaposes, as Jennifer Friedlander describes it, the tiny handprints of an "innocent child" and the "depraved world of adults", writ large on a gigantic canvas.

Harvey has also commented: "I know enough to know that she probably didn't do any of the murders, that she was just in a relationship where she was probably too attached to the man who was doing it to extricate herself. That her life was probably too dull and boring to throw the relationship away ... I don't believe that's 30 years' worth of reputation as one of the most vile and notorious murderers in British criminal history."

Harvey's agent bought the work, and sold it to Charles Saatchi for £11,000. Saatchi later sold it for an estimated £100,000. It was owned by US commodities trader Frank Gallipoli, who purchased it from Saatchi's collection. It is now owned by Damien Hirst.

== Sensation exhibition ==
The painting was included in the controversial Sensation exhibition of Young British Artists at the Royal Academy of Art in London in 1997. Norman Rosenthal, the Secretary of the Royal Academy, described it as the single most important painting in the show – "a very, very cathartic picture ... It is an incredibly serious and sober work of art that needs to be seen." However, it provoked angry press and public comment before the exhibition opened.

Four members of the Royal Academy – Craigie Aitchison, Gillian Ayres, Michael Sandle and John Ward – resigned in protest at its inclusion in the exhibition. The Metropolitan Police Clubs and Vice Unit visited the exhibition before it opened, but could not find sufficient evidence to bring a prosecution in respect of any of the exhibits under the Obscene Publications Act.

Winnie Johnson (mother of Keith Bennett, one of Hindley's victims, whose body remains missing) asked for the portrait to be excluded from the exhibition to protect her feelings. She joined a protest group, Mothers Against Murder and Aggression, that picketed the show's first day on 18 September. The charity Kidscape accused the Royal Academy of "sick exploitation of dead children" in an effort to attract paying visitors to address its financial deficit.

Windows at Burlington House, where the Academy is based, were smashed. The painting was vandalised twice, by two different artists – Peter Fisher and Jacques Rolé – on the opening day of the exhibition, 18 September 1997. Fisher had smuggled blue and red Indian ink into the exhibition, concealed inside two camera film cases; he threw the ink over the painting and smeared it in. After witnessing this, Rolé left the exhibition, returned with eggs bought nearby, and threw three or four at the painting before being stopped by an off-duty police officer.

The painting was removed to be restored, and was rehung after two weeks behind a protective perspex screen. Security guards stood nearby while the exhibition was open to the public.

Hindley wrote from prison to ask for her portrait to be removed from the exhibition, reasoning that such action was necessary because the work was "a sole disregard not only for the emotional pain and trauma that would inevitably be experienced by the families of the Moors victims but also the families of any child victim." Despite all the protests, the painting continued to hang at the exhibition. The exhibition drew approximately 300,000 visitors, significantly more than usual, but less than the 813,000 visitors attracted to the Royal Academy's Monet exhibition in 1999.

The reaction to Harvey's painting in London has been compared to that received by Andy Warhol's 36-feet-square mural Thirteen Most Wanted Men, which comprised large copies of photographs from a "most wanted" booklet published by the New York Police Department, and was installed in the New York State Pavilion at the 1964 World's Fair. After protests by sponsors, Warhol's work was quickly painted over. The reaction to the potent mixture of the sacred and the profane parallels that to Andres Serrano's prize-winning 1987 photograph Piss Christ in Washington DC in 1989 and in Melbourne in 1997, and Chris Ofili's Turner Prize-winning painting The Holy Virgin Mary in New York in 1999.

== Later exhibition ==
The work was shown when the Sensation show went on tour, at the Berlin Hamburger Bahnhof museum from 30 September 1998 to 30 January 1999, and at the Brooklyn Museum of Art from 2 October 1999 to 9 January 2000, and later at the Saatchi Gallery at County Hall in central London.

Harvey's painting remained almost unknown in the US, and caused little reaction when the exhibition opened in New York in 1999. (Chris Ofili's The Holy Virgin Mary attracted greater criticism: it was called "sick" and "disgusting" by New York mayor Rudy Giuliani, and white paint was thrown over it.)

Harvey's painting made a controversial brief appearance in a promotional video for the 2012 Olympic Games in 2008.

A limited edition print of the artwork was destroyed with a paintball gun on the Channel 4 programme Jimmy Carr Destroys Art on 25 October 2022 following an audience vote.
