= Norman Rosenthal =

British independent curator and art historian

Sir Norman Rosenthal
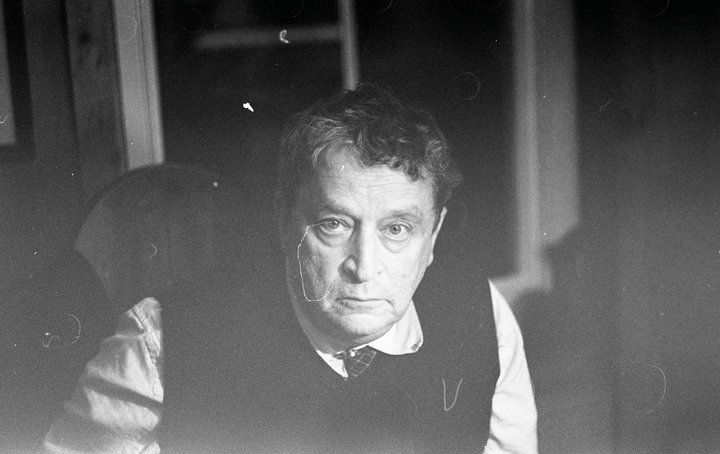
- Rosenthal in 2012
- Born: 8 November 1944 (age 81); Cambridge, England
- Occupation: Art curator

Sir Norman Rosenthal (born 8 November 1944) is a British independent curator and art historian. From 1970 to 1974 he was Exhibitions Officer at Brighton Museum and Art Gallery. In 1974 he became a curator at the Institute of Contemporary Arts, London, leaving in 1976. The following year, in 1977, he joined the Royal Academy in London as Exhibitions Secretary where he remained until his resignation in 2008. Rosenthal has been a trustee of numerous different national and international cultural organisations since the 1980s; he is currently on the board of English National Ballet. In 2007, he was awarded a knighthood in the Queen's Birthday Honours List. Rosenthal is well known for his support of contemporary art, and is particularly associated with the German artists Joseph Beuys, Georg Baselitz, Anselm Kiefer, Julian Schnabel and Gregor Schneider, the Italian painter Francesco Clemente, and the generation of British artists that came to prominence in the early 1990s known as the YBAs (Young British Artists).

== Early life and education ==
Norman Rosenthal was born in Cambridge on 8 November 1944, the son of Jewish refugees Paul Rosenthal (born 1904 in Nové Zámky, Slovakia) and Käthe Zucker (born 1907 in Mühlhausen, Thuringia, Germany). Zucker emigrated to London first, in August 1939. Paul Rosenthal came with the Free Czech Army two years later in 1941. The couple moved from Cambridge to North West London after their first son, Norman, was born in 1944. Rosenthal's father, Paul Rosenthal, managed a Czech emigrants' club in Little Venice. It was his mother particularly who nurtured his love of culture. When he was nine she took him to see The Marriage of Figaro at Covent Garden. Weekends were often spent walking from their home in north-west London to visit the National Gallery and Kenwood House in Hampstead.

Rosenthal was educated at Westminster City School, London. From 1963 to 1966 he read History at the University of Leicester under Jack Simmons and W.G. Hoskins, author of The Making of the English Landscape. In 1965, at the age of 19, Rosenthal organised his first exhibition, Artists in Cornwall, at the Leicester Museum and Art Gallery as part of the University of Leicester's University Arts Festival.

After graduation he returned to London. Seeking employment, he walked into Agnew & Sons Ltd, art dealers and print publishers on Bond Street, and enquired whether any positions were available. He was given the job of researcher and librarian on the spot, beginning work immediately. Rosenthal remained with Agnew & Sons for three years, until 1968. The following year, he won a German state studentship and left London to pursue a PhD at the School of Slavonic and East European Studies at the Free University of Berlin. Initially, his research subject was German peasant emancipation in the 18th century, but he soon changed his subject to art criticism of German Expressionism—for these subjects he was supervised by Francis Carsten and James Joll. He was, however, not to finish his thesis: in 1970 a vacancy came up in the UK for Exhibitions Officer at Brighton Museum and Art Gallery, which at the time was under the directorship of John Morley. Rosenthal remained in the post for four years and learnt a great deal from Morley.

== ICA, London ==
In 1974, Rosenthal was appointed a Curator at the Institute of Contemporary Arts (ICA), London. During his two-year period at the Institute he organised two key exhibitions and made lasting working relationships, in particular with the Berlin-based art critic Christos M. Joachimides and German artist Joseph Beuys. Between 30 October and 24 November 1974 Rosenthal organised an exhibition with Joachimides of new radical German art called Art into Society; Society into Art: Seven German Artists. Art into Society took place as a part of a German Month of events that included lectures by critical theorists of the Frankfurt School of Philosophy. Artists included Joseph Beuys, Hans Haacke, Klaus Staeck, Albrecht D, KP Brehmer KP Brehmer, Dieter Hacker and Gustav Metzger, whose work was to urge artists to strike for three years to "bring down the art system". Apart from a brief visit to Ireland, Beuys remained present in the gallery for the majority of the exhibition: he engaged in conversations with the audience on how to achieve democracy, sketching out his ideas onto numerous chalkboards subsequently strewn across the floor.

The following year, in 1975, Rosenthal again worked with Joachimides on the exhibition Eight Artists, Eight Attitudes, Eight Greeks between 5 November and 4 December. It coincided with a Greek Month to celebrate the fall of the Colonel's Dictatorship in Athens the previous year. Artists, including Stephen Antonakos, Vlassis Caniaris, Chryssa, Jannis Kounellis, Pavlos, Lucas Samaras, Panayiotis Vassilakis (Takis) and Costas Tsoclis, sought to "examine the facts of a spiritual as well as an actual immigration".

As Director of Exhibitions, Rosenthal famously was beaten up by Keith Allen and his anti-establishment friends. To this day flecks of blood remain preserved beneath plexiglass on the ICA office wall. Beneath it, a title reads: "This is Norman’s Blood."

== Royal Academy, London ==
In 1977, The Spectator published a short polemical article Rosenthal wrote called "The Future of the RA". In it he criticised the organisation for its lack of driving philosophy. It had fantastic galleries, but lacked money and vision. Partly as a result of this article Rosenthal was eventually offered a job as Exhibitions Secretary by then President Hugh Casson.

Rosenthal's first exhibition at the Royal Academy in 1978, at the suggestion of Bryan Robertson, was on the American painter Robert Motherwell. It was followed by a major exhibition on Post-Impressionism in 1979–80, and in 1981 A New Spirit in Painting, an exhibition of neo-Expressionist painting co-curated with Christos M Joachimides and Sir Nicholas Serota. Considered to be one of Rosenthal's greatest achievements, this exhibition foregrounded the work of painters Georg Baselitz and Anselm Kiefer, and set the agenda for a "return to painting" in the early 1980s. In 1997, Rosenthal co-curated the very controversial exhibition Sensation: Young British Artists from the Saatchi Collection with Charles Saatchi. Besides these two most notorious exhibitions, for with which Rosenthal is most readily identified, he organised over thirty exhibitions ranging from Art in Plantagenet England 1200–1400 in 1987 to Anish Kapoor in 2009 (for a full list see below). The majority of these exhibitions were initiatives of the Royal Academy that travelled to museums in the United States and Europe. While still at the Royal Academy Rosenthal curated a number of exhibitions in Germany, including Zeitgeist at the Martin-Gropius-Bau, Berlin with Christos M. Joachimides in 1982, Metropolis, again at the Martin-Gropius-Bau, Berlin, in 1991, and Nationalschätze aus Deutschland: Von Luther zum Bauhaus at the Bundeskunsthalle, Bonn in 2005-6.

Rosenthal was notoriously unpopular with Royal Academicians. Many felt their work had been ignored by the Exhibitions Secretary, and was only displayed in the annual Summer Exhibition with which Rosenthal played no part." I want the best exhibitions. That's that," Rosenthal told Fiona Maddocks in an article for the Evening Standard in 1998. "OK. Strictly speaking all the Academicians are equal," he continued, "But it's an open secret that some are more equal than others: Tracey Emin, Norman Foster, Zaha Hadid, David Hockney, Gary Hume, Anish Kapoor, Tom Phillips, Richard Rogers, the 'Angel of the North man'." In an interview on BBC Omnibus in 1997 he questioned the significance of the artist John Ward, a Royal Academician, and was felt to have ridiculed an elderly Victor Pasmore. That month three Academicians resigned – Michael Sandle (who subsequently rejoined), Craigie Aitchison and Gillian Ayres. Two cited the treatment of Pasmore as one of their chief reasons for going. The inclusion of Myra, Marcus Harvey's contentious portrait of Myra Hindley, in the Sensation exhibition and Rosenthal himself were other reasons cited. In 2004, Rosenthal was nearly sacked by Lawton Fitt, an ex-Goldmann Sachs banker who took the role of the Royal Academy's Secretary. "Fitt and two others sent me a fax saying my services were no longer required and I should find a solicitor," Rosenthal has said. "I did: Cherie Blair. My biggest regret is not having seen their faces when they received her letter."

In 2008, Rosenthal finally resigned from his post at the Royal Academy. It is disputed whether or not he was pushed or left of his own accord. He stayed a further two years in an advisory role, curating an exhibition of Cranach in 2008 and Anish Kapoor in 2009. Writing in The Guardian, art critic Jonathan Jones commented that "The Royal Academy will be an infinitely poorer place without Sir Norman Rosenthal." “He turned a place whose membership and traditions give it a massive leaning towards the conservative into a world-class, influential venue for exhibitions of contemporary art."

== Life after the Royal Academy ==
Since his resignation from the Royal Academy Rosenthal has continued to curate exhibitions and write on established and emerging contemporary artists. In June 2011, Julian Schnabel, curated by Rosenthal, opened at Venice Museo Correr. In 2012, he curated an exhibition of recent Baselitz paintings for Villa Schöningen in Berlin and also contributed a long career retrospective essay for White Cube Gallery on the painter George Baselitz. The same year he wrote on the painter Raqib Shaw for Ropac Gallery in Paris and on Joseph Beuys for the exhibition Stag Monuments also for Ropac Gallery, Paris. He is an advisor to the Leiden Gallery in New York, a major private collection of 17th-century Dutch Leiden School paintings centred on Rembrandt. He is currently working with New York-based curator Alex Gartenfeld on the exhibition Empire State, a survey of New York art today, which will run at the Palaexpo, Rome from April – September 2013. In May 2013, a major solo exhibition of Anish Kapoor curated by Rosenthal will open at Martin-Gropius-Bau, Berlin. In September 2020, Rosenthal became chairman of the CIRCA Approval Council, an art platform based in London's Piccadilly Circus. Founded in October 2020 by British-Irish artist Josef O'Connor, they commission and stream a monthly programme of art and culture, every evening at 20:21, across a global network of billboards in London, Tokyo and Seoul.

== Personal life ==
In 1989, Rosenthal married Manuela Mena Marques, former Deputy Director of the Prado, Madrid, and former Senior Curator of Eighteenth-Century Painting and Goya. Together they have two daughters.

== Boards ==
Throughout his career Rosenthal has been a member of numerous boards, these include member: Opera Board, Royal Opera House, 1994–98; board, Palazzo Grassi, Venice, 1986– 2004; Comité Scientifique, Réunion des Musées Nationaux, Paris, 2000–05; Trustee, Thyssen Bornemisza Foundation, 2002–2012 (Rosenthal publicly resigned in protest at Baroness Thyssen Bornemisza's sale of Constable's The Lock); Baltic Centre for Contemporary Art, Gateshead, 2004–06; and currently English National Ballet, 2012 – ongoing.

== Awards ==
Throughout his career Rosenthal has received numerous awards in recognition of his services to art and culture, including the Chevalier in 1987; the Iron Cross Order of Merit (Germany) in 1991; Cavaliere Ufficiale, Order of Merit (Italy) in 1992; Officier, l'Ordre des Arts et des Lettres (France) in 2003; the German British Forum Award in 2003; and the Order of Aztec Eagle (Mexico) in 2006. He was made an Honorary Fellow of the Royal College of Art, London in 1987, received a Hon. DLitt from Southampton University in 2003, and an Hon. DLitt from Leicester University in 2006. In 2007 he was awarded a knighthood in the Queen's Birthday Honours List.

== Cameos ==
Rosenthal made cameo appearances in the British film director Derek Jarman's Sebastiane (1976) and Caravaggio (1986). He was interviewed by the filmmaker John Maybury in Love is the Devil: Study for a Portrait of Francis Bacon, and played a donkey-riding Ludwig Wittgenstein in Otto Muehl's Back to Fucking Cambridge.
