= Jonathan Parsons (artist) =

British artist

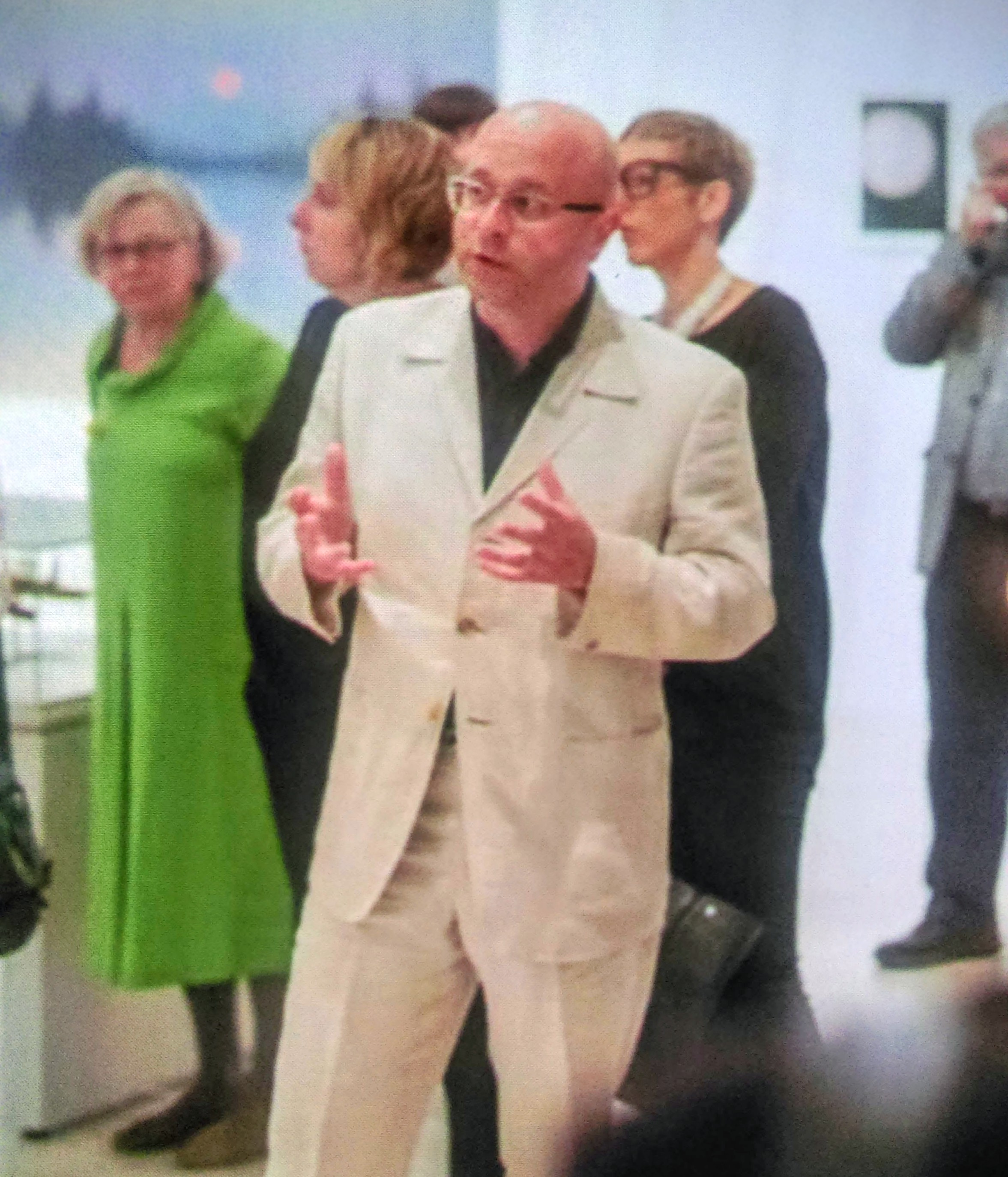
Jonathan Parsons

Jonathan Parsons is a British artist, writer and lecturer born in 1970 and active since 1990. His practice includes installation, sculpture, found objects, drawing, painting and fabrication.

== Biography ==
Parsons graduated from University of London Goldsmiths’ College, with BA Honours degree in Fine Art in 1992.

In 1997 his dissected map sculpture Carcass (1994) was selected for inclusion in the Sensation exhibition at the Royal Academy of Arts, which toured to Berlin and New York. His work was later selected for the British Art Show 5.

His permanently installed architectural map sculpture Let Me Count the Ways was commissioned in 2008 by the UK Government Art Collection for the new British Embassy in Doha, Qatar. Other commissions include For John Constable, a landscape installation for Salisbury Arts Centre, 2011 and Cruciform Vision, a painting for Guildford Cathedral, 2011 which was shortlisted for the ACE Award for Art in a Religious Context.

He co-curated Seeing Round Corners for Turner Contemporary, Margate in 2016 with artist David Ward. The exhibition received positive reviews in publications such as The Guardian and The Telegraph.

He has taught fine art at higher education institutions around the UK and is an associate lecturer in fine art at the University for the Creative Arts in Farnham.

== Exhibitions ==
=== Solo exhibitions ===
Recent solo exhibitions include: The Black Drawings, The Bunker Gallery, Isle of Wight (2022), Scribble and the Structures of Depiction, Hardwick Gallery, Cheltenham (2021), the land art piece Fossil Ocean Floor, Dorking, Surrey, UK (2018), and New Paintings, New Art Projects, London (2014).

=== Group exhibitions ===
Recent group exhibitions include: Pacific Breeze II, White Conduit Projects, London (2021), Collateral Drawing 5, Strange Cargo, Folkestone (2017), Abstract Remix, New Art Projects, London (2017), The Order of Things, The Wilson, Cheltenham (2017) and Mechanical Abstract, Turps Gallery, London (2016).

Parsons' work also featured in Mind the Map, London Transport Museum (2012), Meanwhile, John Hansard Gallery, 2012, The Art of Mapping, Air Gallery, TAG Fine Arts, London, and Abigail Reynolds & Jonathan Parsons: A Dialogue on Landscape & Constable, Salisbury Arts Centre, 2011.
