= James Rielly =

Welsh artist

James Malcolm Rielly is a Welsh artist living and working in France. His paintings frequently take on absurd subject matter, and he has done a series of paintings depicting bedsheet ghost costumes. He was born in 1956 in Wrexham. Rielly studied at the Gloucester College of Art & Design in Cheltenham and at Belfast College of Art.

Rielly was associated with the group of artists known as the Young British Artists (YBAs). In 1997 he exhibited with other YBAs in the Charles Saatchi-sponsored Sensation exhibition.

In 2017, Rielly was one of the artists to sign onto Volta 13, the satellite art fair of Art Basel.
