= Bundesautobahn 656 =

Autobahn in Germany

A 656
- Bundesautobahn 656
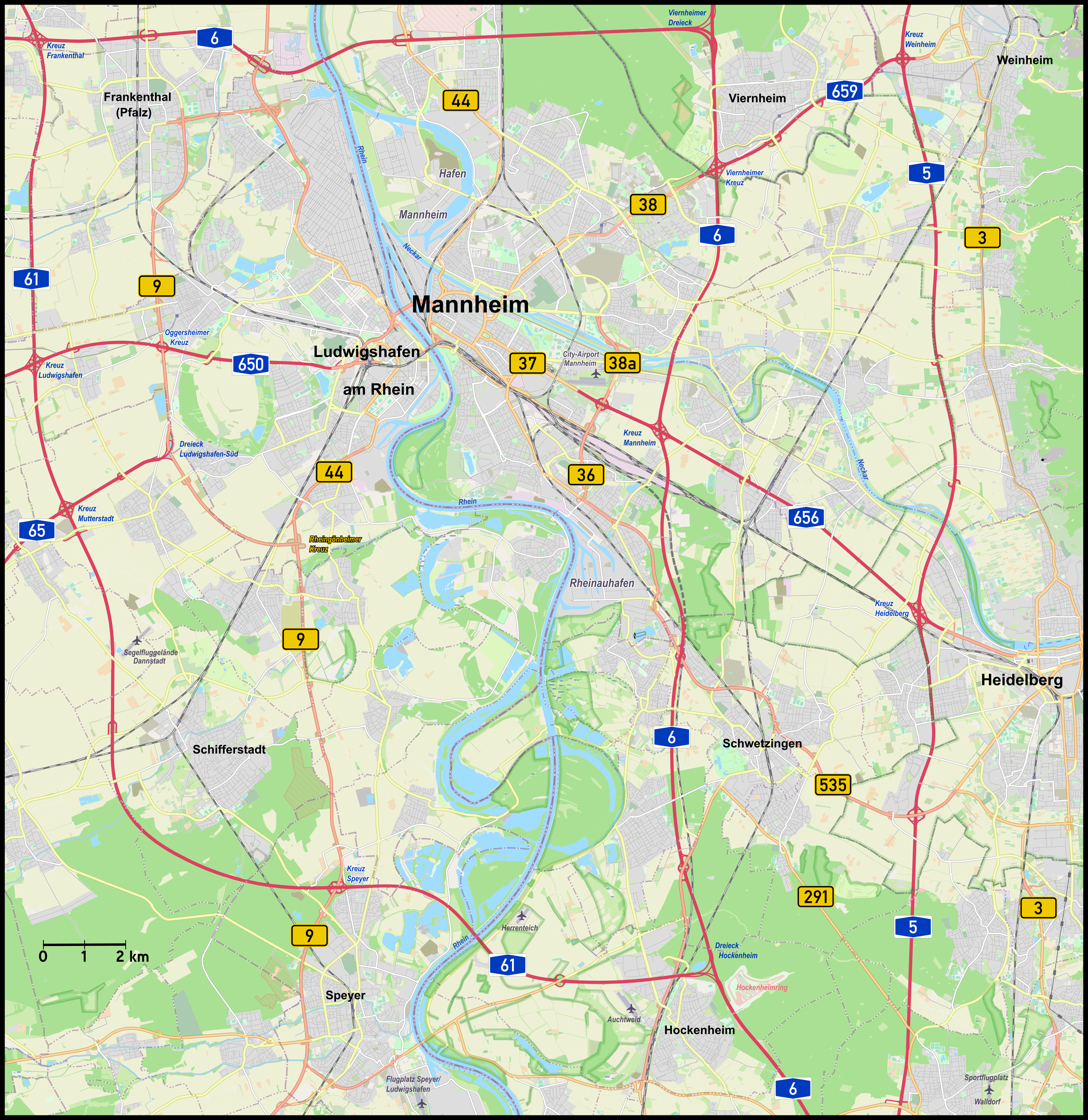

Route information
- Length: 11.9 km (7.4 mi)
- Existed: 1935–present

Location
- Country: Germany
- States: Baden-Württemberg

Highway system
- Roads in Germany; Autobahns; List; Federal; List; State; E-roads

Bundesautobahn 656 (translates from German as Federal Motorway 656, short form Autobahn 656, abbreviated as BAB 656 or A 656) is an autobahn in Germany. It leads from Mannheim-Neckarau to Autobahnkreuz (motorway junction) Heidelberg.

== History ==
The planning for an Autobahn between Mannheim and Heidelberg began as early as 1926. It was taken into account in the planning for the HaFraBa (Hamburg-Frankfurt-Basel). The motorway was opened in 1935 under the Third Reich as a Reichsautobahn). It originally stretched from the eastern end of Mannheim (Schwetzingerstadt/Oststadt) to Heidelberg (Bergheim), Bergheimer Strasse. The end sections of the autobahn became part of State Highway (Bundesstrasse) B 37 in the 1990s, thus shortening the autobahn from its original 14.8 kilometres (9.2 mi) to 11.9 kilometres (7.4 mi). At the same time, most of the crossing bridges were torn down and rebuilt with enough space to make room for an emergency lane on both sides. Until the mid-90s there was no speed limit on the A 656; today the speed limit is 120 km/h (75 mph).

== Exit list ==
Exits numbered from West to East.

B 37	to Mannheim
1	Mannheim Mitte
(2)	Mannheim-Neckarau B 38a
(3)	Mannheim 4-way interchange A 6
	military exit
(4)	Mannheim-Seckenheim
	rail bridge 100 m
(5)	Heidelberg 4-way interchange A 5
6	Heidelberg-Wieblingen
7	Bergheimer Straße
B 37	to Heidelberg
