= Sensation (art exhibition) =

1997–2000 art exhibition

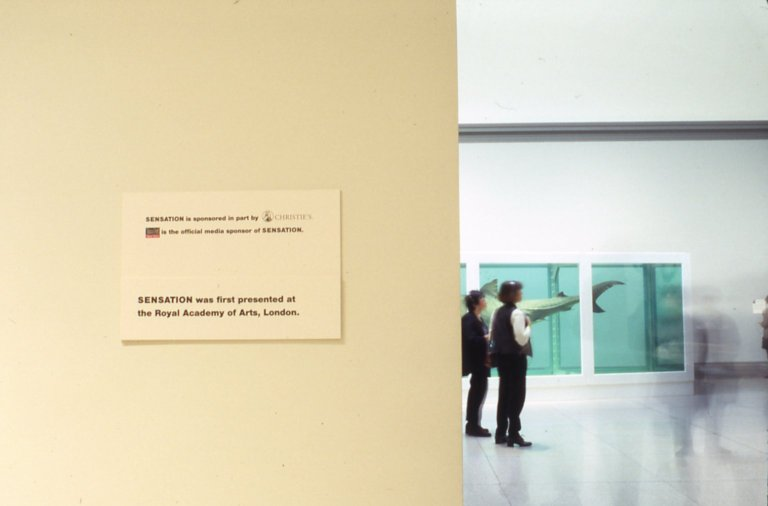
Sensation installed at Brooklyn Museum (October 1999 – January 2000)

Sensation was an exhibition of the collection of contemporary art owned by Charles Saatchi, including many works by Young British Artists (YBAs), which first took place 18 September – 28 December 1997 at the Royal Academy of Arts in London. The exhibition later toured to the Hamburger Bahnhof in Berlin and the Brooklyn Museum in New York City. A proposed showing at the National Gallery of Australia was cancelled when the gallery's director decided the exhibition was "too close to the market."

The show generated controversy in London and New York City due to the inclusion of images of Myra Hindley and the Virgin Mary. It was criticised by New York City mayor Rudolph Giuliani and others for attempting to boost the value of the work by showing it in institutions and public museums.

== Works ==
Myra: 1995 depiction of the child killer Myra Hindley by the YBA Marcus Harvey

The artworks in Sensation were from the collection of Charles Saatchi, a leading collector, advertising mogul and publiciser of contemporary art. Norman Rosenthal, the Royal Academy of Arts exhibitions secretary, helped to stage the 116 works by 42 different artists on view. (110 are in the catalogue, with differences between that and the exhibition checklist.) Many of the pieces had already become famous, or notorious, with the British public (for example, Damien Hirst's shark suspended in formaldehyde titled The Physical Impossibility of Death in the Mind of Someone Living, Tracey Emin's tent titled Everyone I Have Ever Slept With 1963–1995), Marc Quinn's self-portrait (a frozen head made from pints of his own blood) and Sarah Lucas's explicitly sexual images and sculptures. Others had already achieved prominence in other ways, such as a successful advertising campaign using an idea from Gillian Wearing's photographs. Sensation was the first time that a wide audience had had the chance to see these works en masse. The Royal Academy posted this disclaimer to visitors on entry:

There will be works of art on display in the Sensation exhibition which some people may find distasteful. Parents should exercise their judgment in bringing their children to the exhibition. One gallery will not be open to those under the age of 18.

== London ==
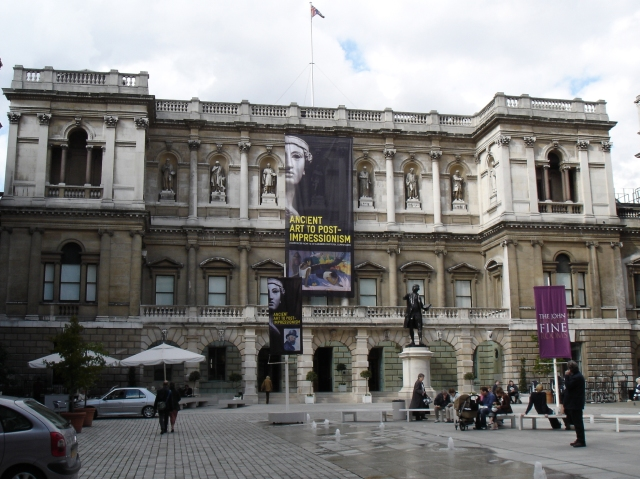
Royal Academy of Arts, London

The opening of Sensation at the Royal Academy of Arts caused a public furore and a media frenzy, with both broadsheet and tabloid journalists falling over themselves to comment on the show's controversial images, and unprecedented crowds queuing up to see for themselves what all the fuss was about. Around a quarter of the RA's 80 academicians gave a warning that the exhibition was inflammatory. They and some members of the public complained about several other exhibits, notably the installations by Jake and Dinos Chapman, which were of child mannequins with noses replaced by penises and mouths in the form of an anus.

However, the biggest media controversy was over Myra, an image of the murderer Myra Hindley by Marcus Harvey. The Mothers Against Murder and Aggression protest group picketed the show, accompanied by Winnie Johnson, the mother of one of Hindley's victims. They asked for the portrait, which is made up of hundreds of copies of a child's handprint, to be excluded to protect Johnson's feelings. Along with supporters she picketed the show's first day. Myra Hindley sent a letter from jail suggesting that her portrait be removed from the exhibition, reasoning that such action was necessary because the work was "a sole disregard not only for the emotional pain and trauma that would inevitably be experienced by the families of the Moors victims but also the families of any child victim." Despite all the protest the painting remained hanging. Windows at Burlington House, the academy's home, were smashed and two demonstrators hurled ink and eggs at the picture as a result, requiring it to be removed and restored. It was put back on display behind Perspex and guarded by security men.

In a press conference on 16 September 1997, David Gordon, Secretary of the Royal Academy commented on the controversial portrait:

"The majority view inside the Academy was that millions and millions of images of Myra Hindley have been reproduced in newspapers and magazines. Books have been written about the murders. Television programmes have been made. Hindley's image is in the public domain; part of our consciousness; an awful part of our recent social history; a legitimate subject for journalism – and for art."

The show was extremely popular with the general public, attracting over 300,000 visitors during its run, helped by the media attention which the strong subject matter had received. For example, the BBC said it featured "gory images of dismembered limbs and explicit pornography".

== Berlin ==
Sensation was shown at the Berlin's Hamburger Bahnhof museum (30 September 1998 – 30 January 1999) and proved so popular that it was extended past its original closing date of 28 December 1998. For art critic Nicola Kuhn from Der Tagesspiegel, there was "no sensation about Sensation". She claimed that the Berlin audience found the yBa's work "more sad and serious than irreverent, funny and dazzling"

== New York City ==
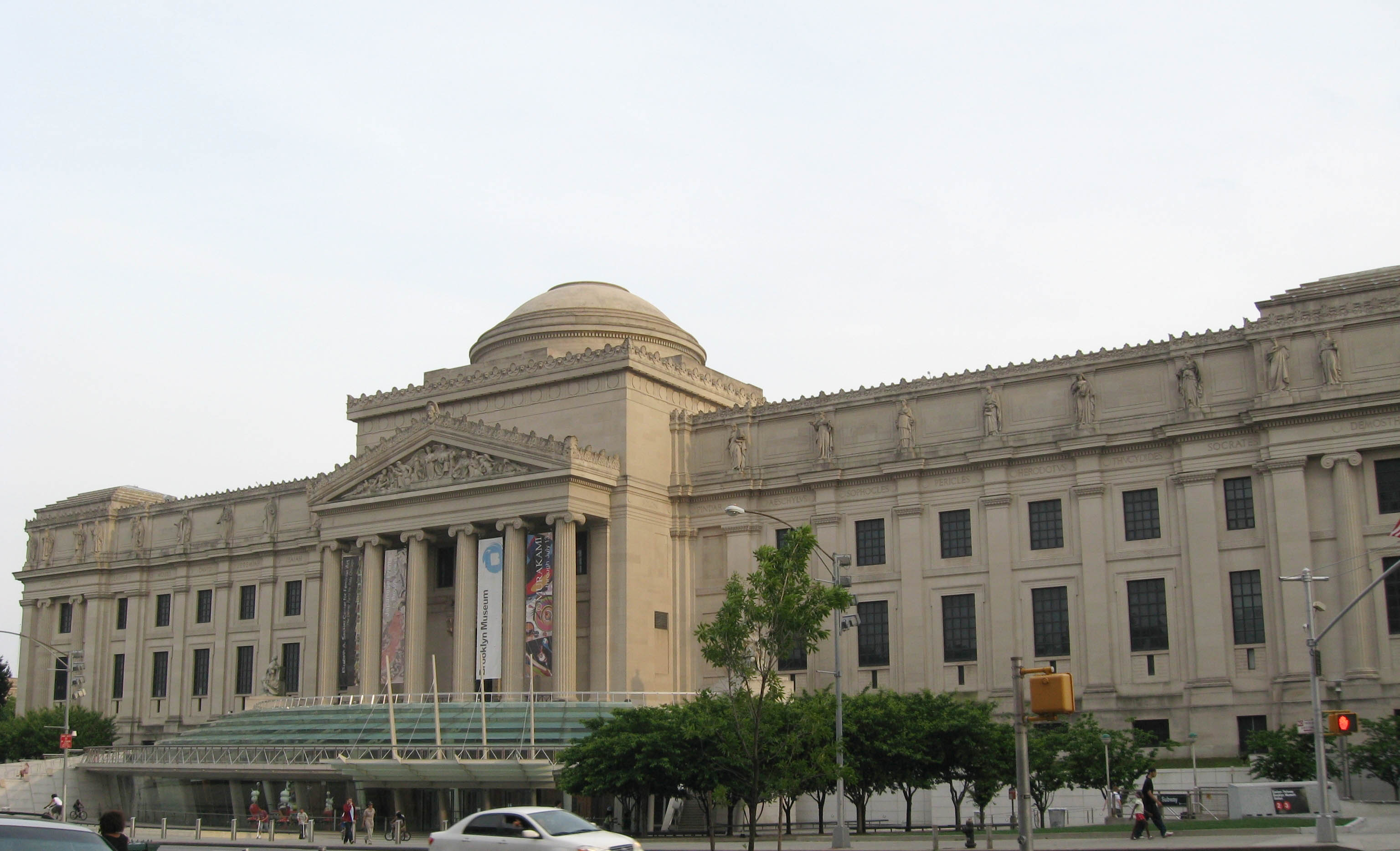
Brooklyn Museum

The exhibition was shown in New York City at the Brooklyn Museum from 2 October 1999 to 9 January 2000. The New York City show was met with instant protest, centering on The Holy Virgin Mary by Chris Ofili, which had not provoked this reaction in London. While the press reported that the piece was "smeared", "splattered", or "stained" with elephant dung, Ofili's work in fact showed a carefully rendered black Madonna decorated with a resin-covered lump of elephant dung. The figure is also surrounded by small collaged images of female genitalia from pornographic magazines; these seemed from a distance to be the traditional cherubim.

New York City Mayor Rudolph Giuliani, who had seen the work in the catalogue but not in the show, called it "sick stuff" and threatened to withdraw the annual $7 million City Hall grant from the Brooklyn Museum hosting the show, because "[y]ou don't have a right to government subsidy for desecrating somebody else's religion." Cardinal John O'Connor, the Archbishop of New York, said, "one must ask if it is an attack on religion itself," and the president of America's biggest group of Orthodox Jews, Mandell Ganchrow, called it "deeply offensive". William A. Donohue, President of the Catholic League for Religious and Civil Rights, said the work "induces revulsion". Giuliani started a lawsuit to evict the museum, and Arnold Lehman, the museum director, filed a federal lawsuit against Giuliani for a breach of the First Amendment.

Hillary Clinton spoke up for the museum, as did the New York Civil Liberties Union. The editorial board of The New York Times said, Giuliani's stance "promises to begin a new Ice Age in New York's cultural affairs." The paper also carried a full-page advertisement in support signed by over 100 actors, writers and artists, including Susan Sarandon, Steve Martin, Norman Mailer, Arthur Miller, Kurt Vonnegut and Susan Sontag. Ofili, who is Roman Catholic, said, "elephant dung in itself is quite a beautiful object."

The United States House of Representatives passed a nonbinding resolution to end federal funding for the museum on 3 October 1999, and New York City did stop funding to the Brooklyn Museum. On 1 November, federal judge Nina Gershon ordered the City not only to restore the funding that was denied to the museum, but also to refrain from continuing its ejectment action. On 16 December 1999, a 72-year-old man was arrested for criminal mischief after smearing the Ofili painting with white paint, which was soon removed. The museum produced a yellow stamp, saying the artworks on show "may cause shock, vomiting, confusion, panic, euphoria and anxiety." and Ofili's painting was shown behind a Plexiglass screen, guarded by a museum attendant and an armed police officer. Jeffrey Hogrefe, art critic for the New York Observer, commented about the museum, "They wanted to get some publicity and they got it. I think it was pretty calculated." The editor-in-chief of the New York City Art & Auction magazine, Bruce Wolmer, said: "When the row eventually fades the only smile will be on the face of Charles Saatchi, a master self-promoter."

In 2021, Lehman published a memoir about his experience of the episode entitled, SENSATION: the Madonna, the Mayor, the Media, and the First Amendment.

== Australia ==
The show was scheduled to open in June 1999 at the National Gallery of Australia, but was cancelled with the director, Brian Kennedy, saying that, although it was due to be funded by the Australian government, it was "too close to the market" since finance for the Brooklyn exhibition included $160,000 from Saatchi, who owned the work; $50,000 from Christie's, who had sold work for Saatchi; and $10,000 from dealers of many of the artists. Kennedy said he was unaware of this when he accepted the show. Saatchi's contribution, the largest single one, was not disclosed by the Brooklyn Museum, until it appeared in court documents. Similarly, when the show opened in London at the Royal Academy, there had been criticisms that it would raise the value of the work.

== Artists exhibited in Sensation ==
=== YBAs ===
- Jake & Dinos Chapman
- Adam Chodzko
- Mat Collishaw
- Tracey Emin
- Marcus Harvey
- Damien Hirst
- Michael Landy
- Abigail Lane
- Sarah Lucas
- Jason Martin
- Ron Mueck
- Chris Ofili
- Richard Patterson
- Simon Patterson
- Marc Quinn
- Fiona Rae
- Jenny Saville
- Sam Taylor-Wood
- Gavin Turk
- Gillian Wearing
- Rachel Whiteread

Floor Laforce

- Yinka Shonibare

=== Other artists from the Saatchi collection ===
- Darren Almond
- Maurizio Anzeri
- Richard Billingham
- Glenn Brown
- Simon Callery
- Keith Coventry
- Peter Davies
- Paul Finnegan
- Mark Francis
- Alex Hartley
- Mona Hatoum
- Langlands & Bell
- Martin Maloney
- Jason Martin
- Alain Miller
- Ron Mueck
- Jonathan Parsons
- Hadrian Pigott
- James Rielly
- Yinka Shonibare
- Jane Simpson
- Mark Wallinger
- Cerith Wyn Evans

== Installation photos from the Brooklyn Museum Archive ==
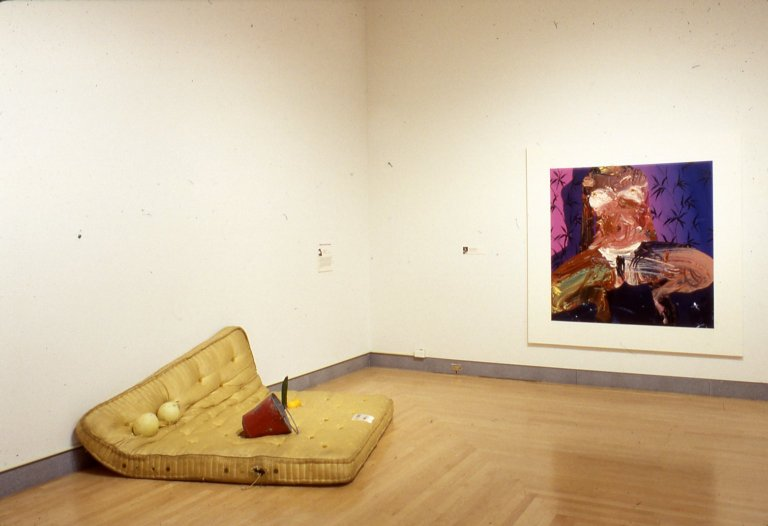

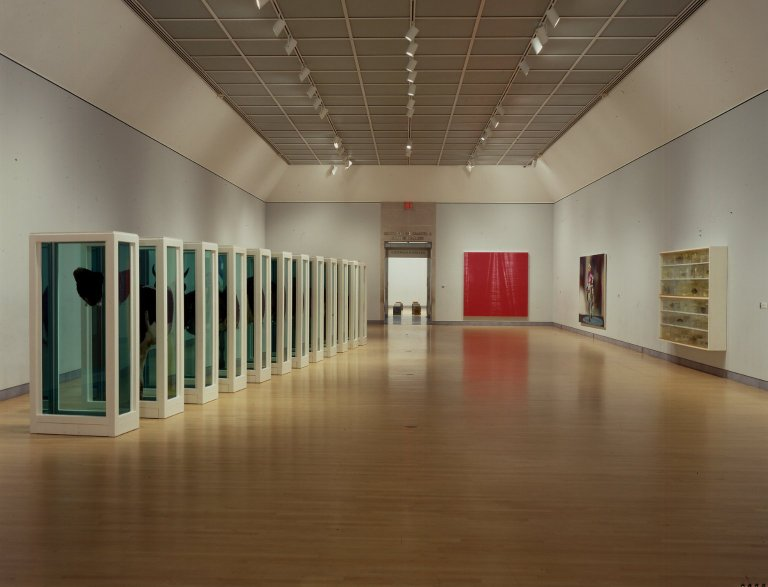

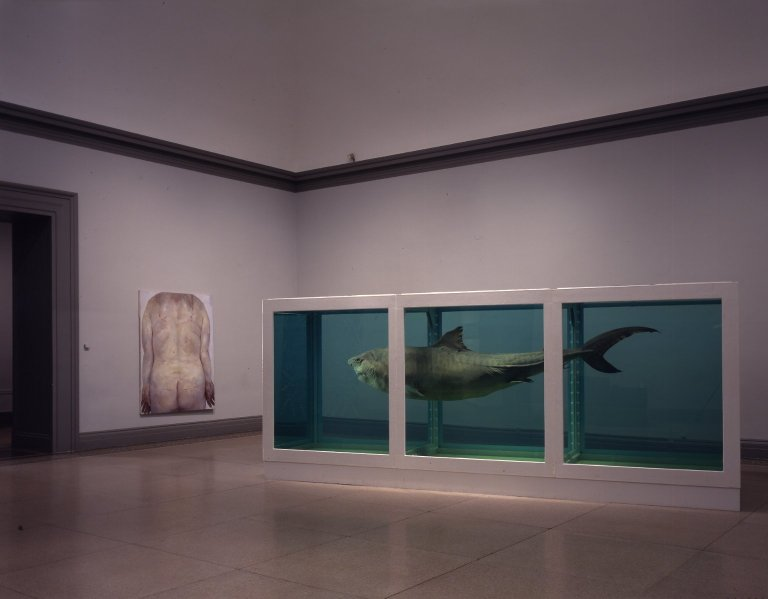

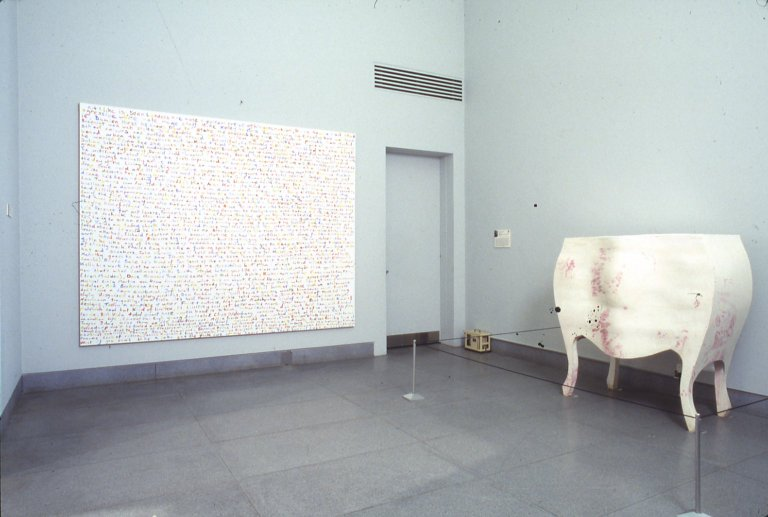

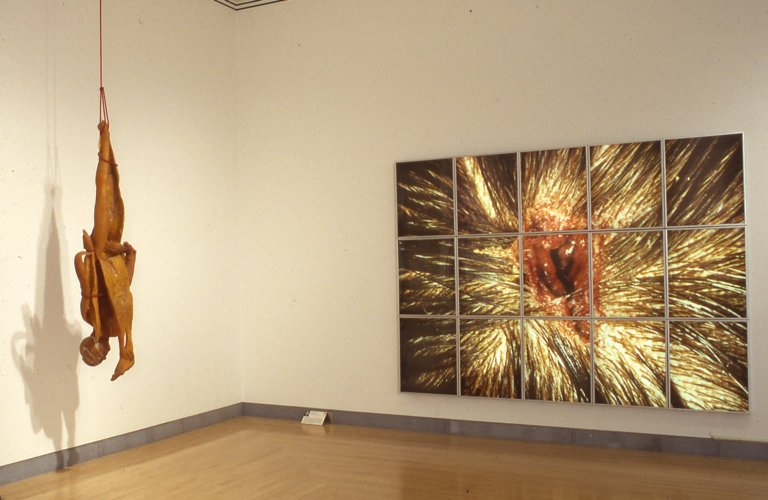

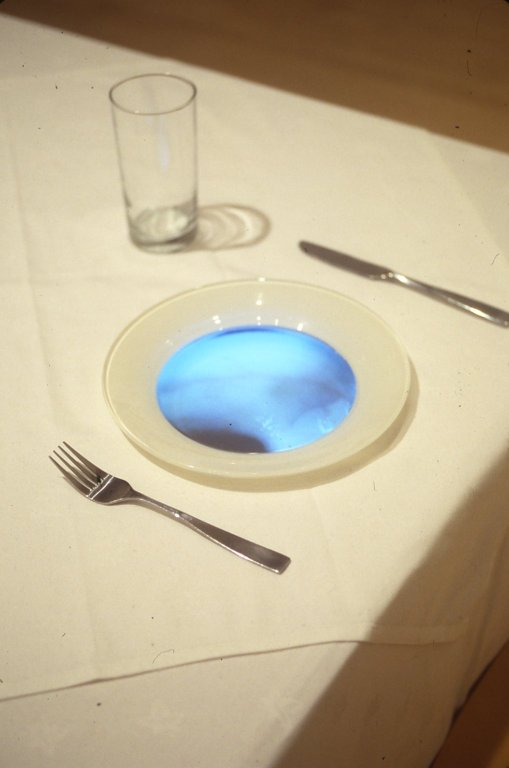

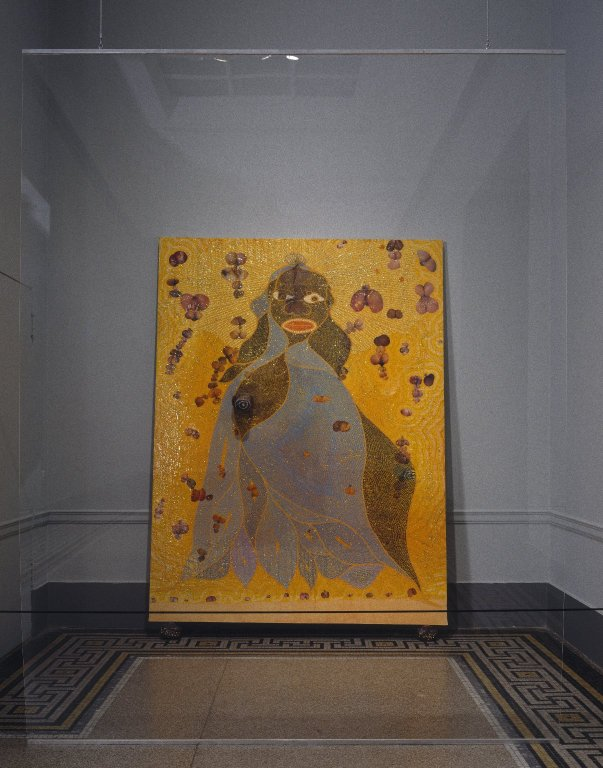

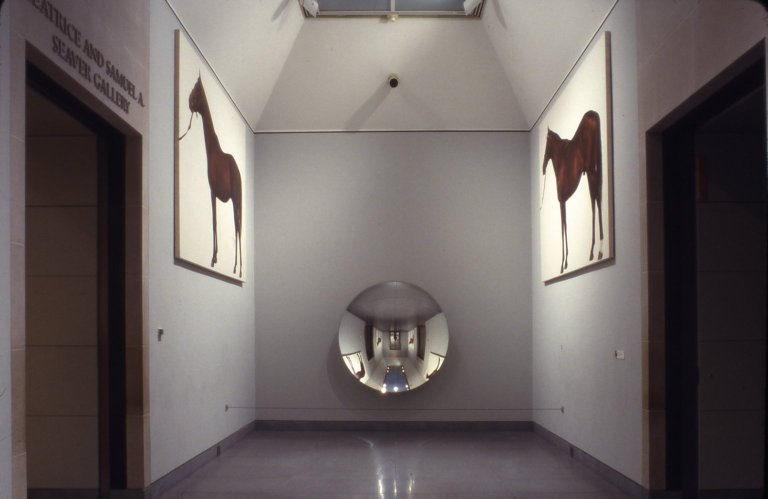

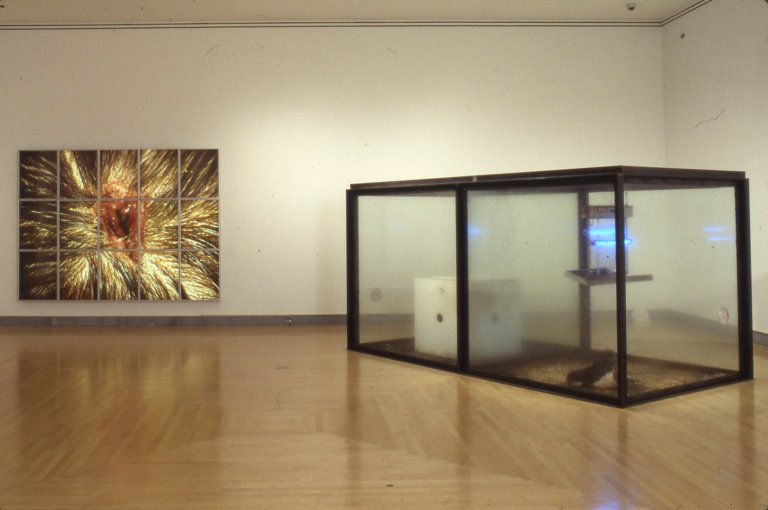

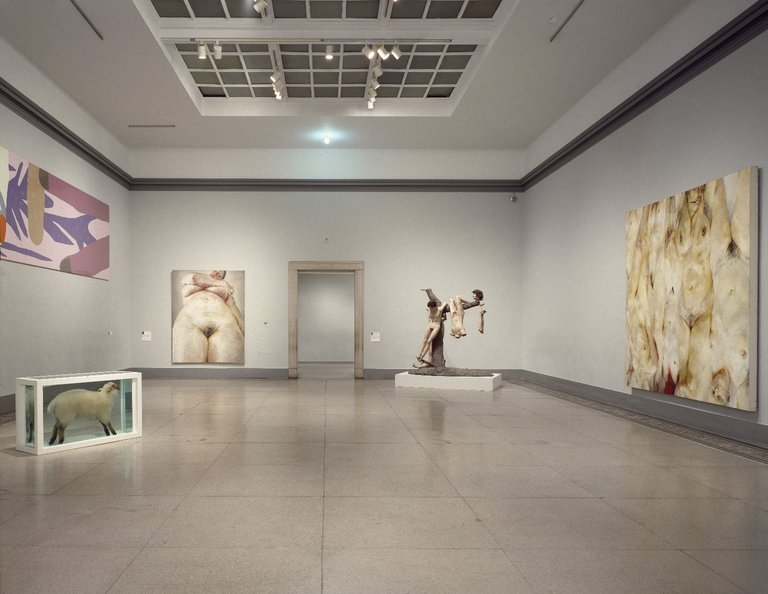

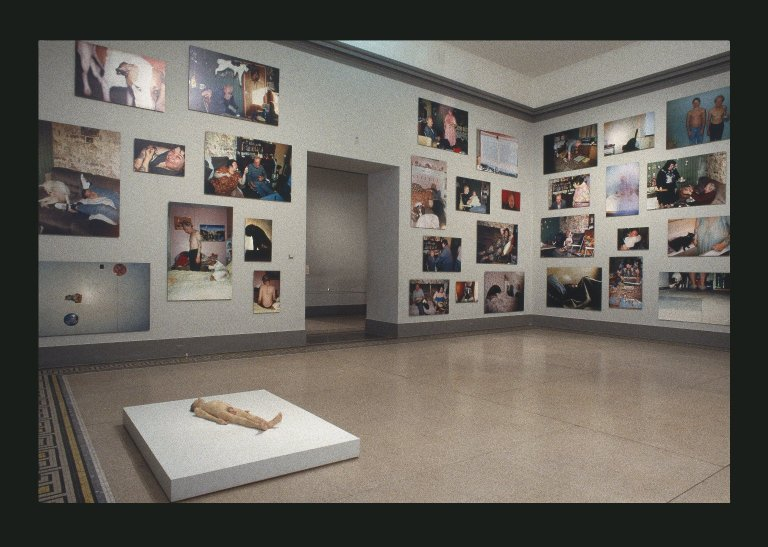

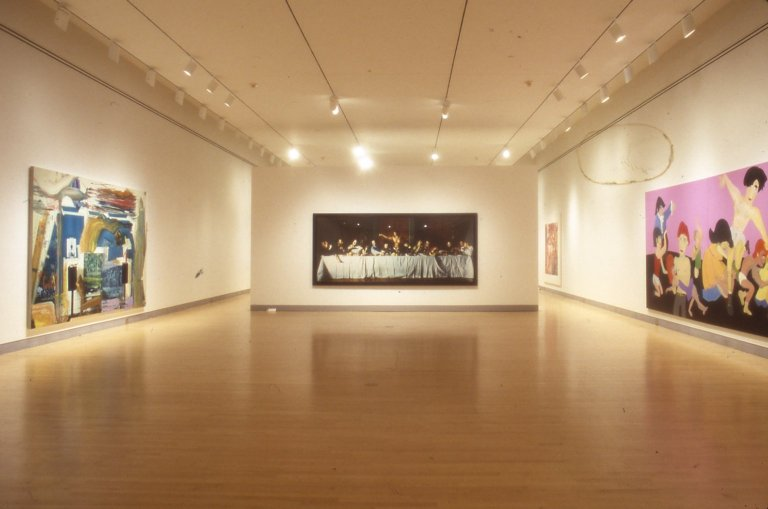

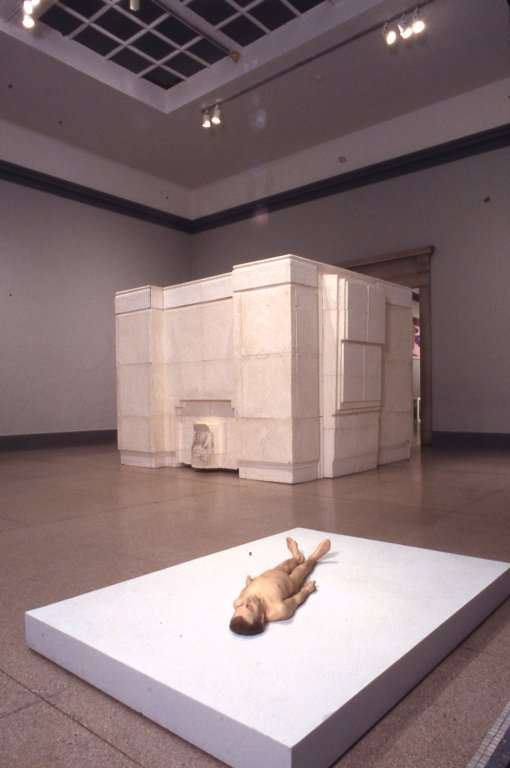

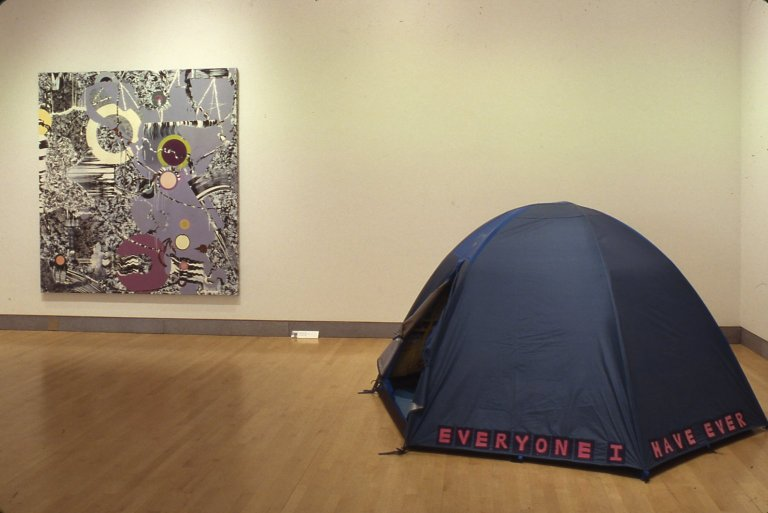

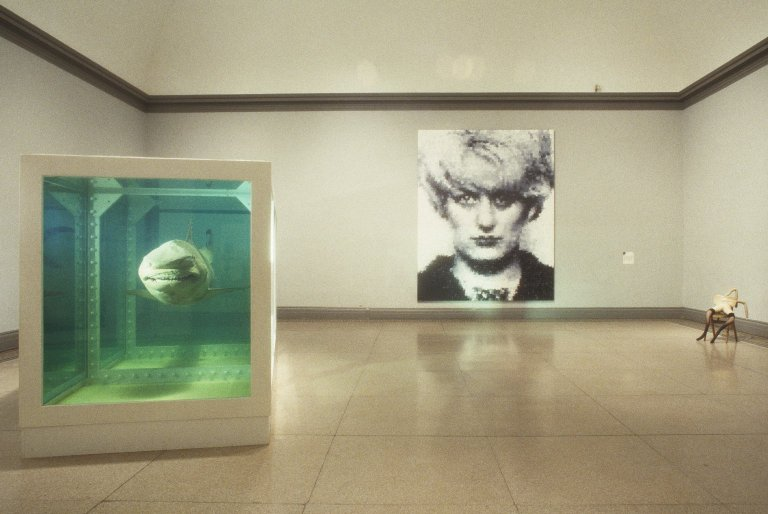

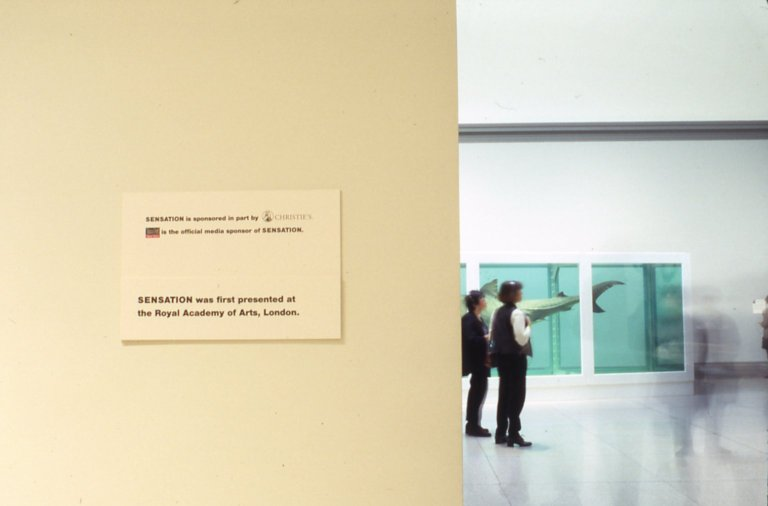

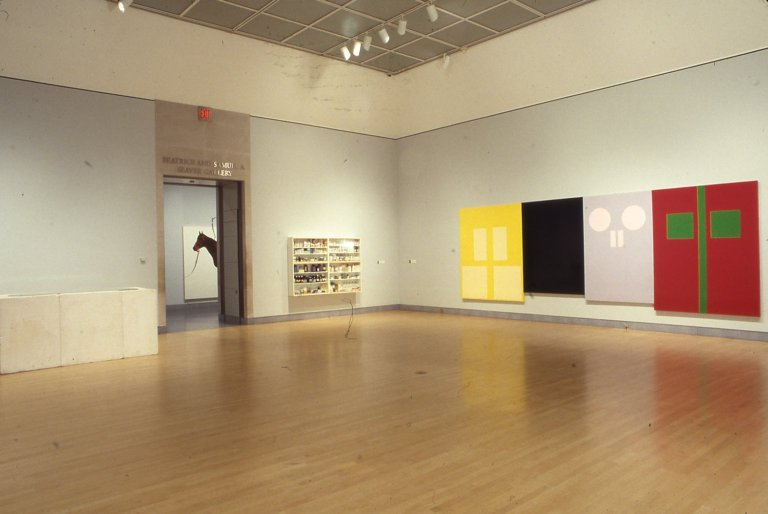
