= Royal Academy of Arts =

Art institution in London, England

Coordinates: 51°30′33″N 0°08′22″W

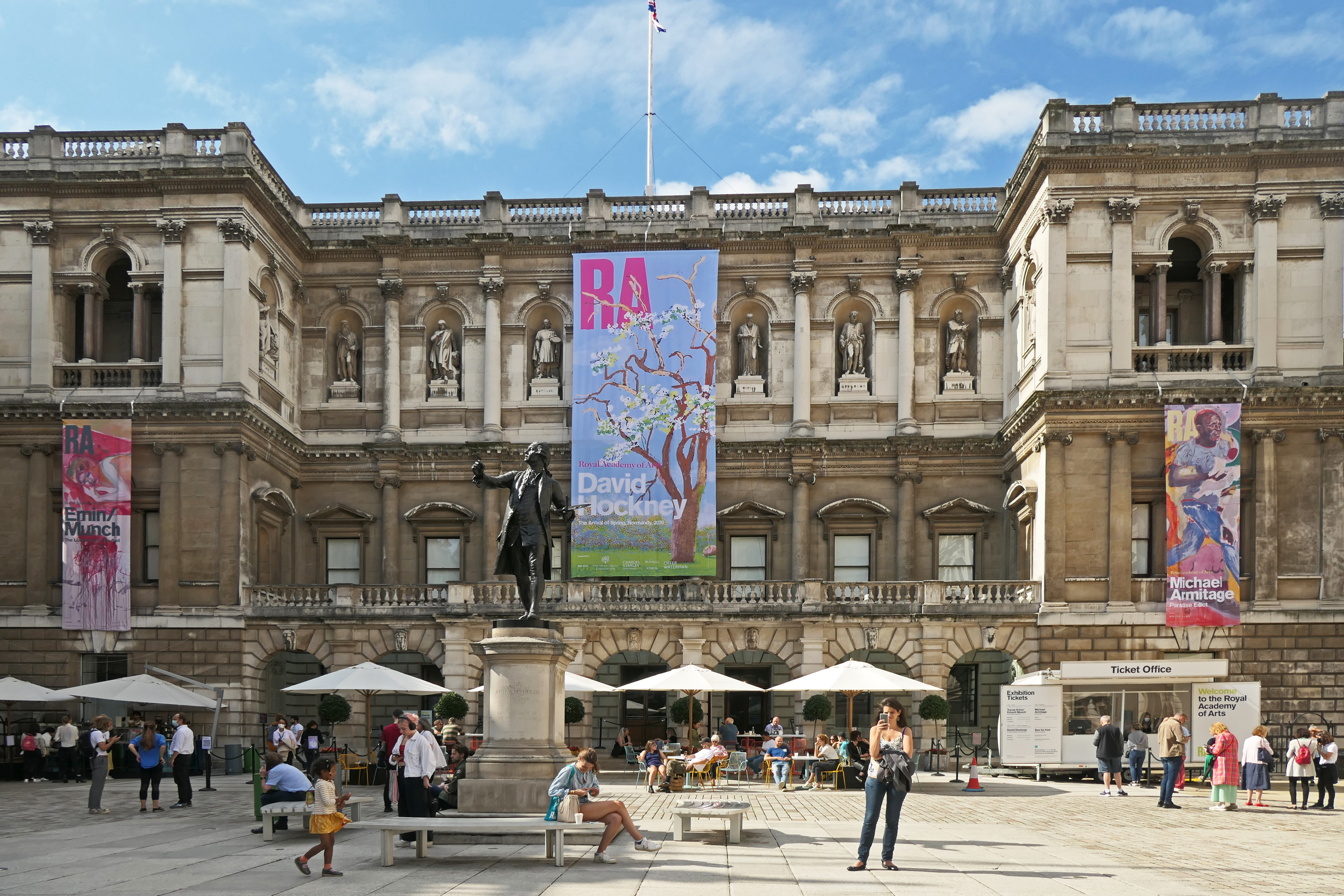
- Established: 1768; 258 years ago
- Location: Burlington House, Piccadilly, London, United Kingdom
- Visitors: 709,961 (2023)
- President: Rebecca Salter
- CEO: Simon Wallis
- Public transit access: Green Park; Piccadilly Circus
- Website: royalacademy.org.uk

The Royal Academy of Arts (RA) is an art institution based in Burlington House in Piccadilly, London, England. Founded in 1768, it has a unique position as an independent, privately funded institution led by eminent artists and architects. Its purpose is to promote the creation, enjoyment and appreciation of the fine arts through exhibitions, education and debate.

== History ==
The origin of the Royal Academy of Arts lies in an attempt in 1755 by members of the Society for the Encouragement of Arts, Manufactures and Commerce, principally the sculptor Henry Cheere, to found an autonomous academy of arts. Before this, several artists were members of the Society for the Encouragement of Arts, Manufactures and Commerce, including Cheere and William Hogarth, or were involved in small-scale private art academies, such as the St Martin's Lane Academy. Although Cheere's attempt failed, the eventual charter, called an 'Instrument', used to establish the Royal Academy of Arts over a decade later, was almost identical to that drawn up by Cheere in 1755.

The success of St Martin's Lane Academy led to the formation of the Society of Artists of Great Britain and the Free Society of Artists. Sir William Chambers, a prominent architect and head of the British government's architects' department, the Office of Works, used his connections with King George III to gain royal patronage and financial support for the Academy. The Royal Academy of Arts was founded through a personal act of King George III on 10 December 1768 with a mission "to establish a school or academy of design for the use of students in the arts" with an annual exhibition.

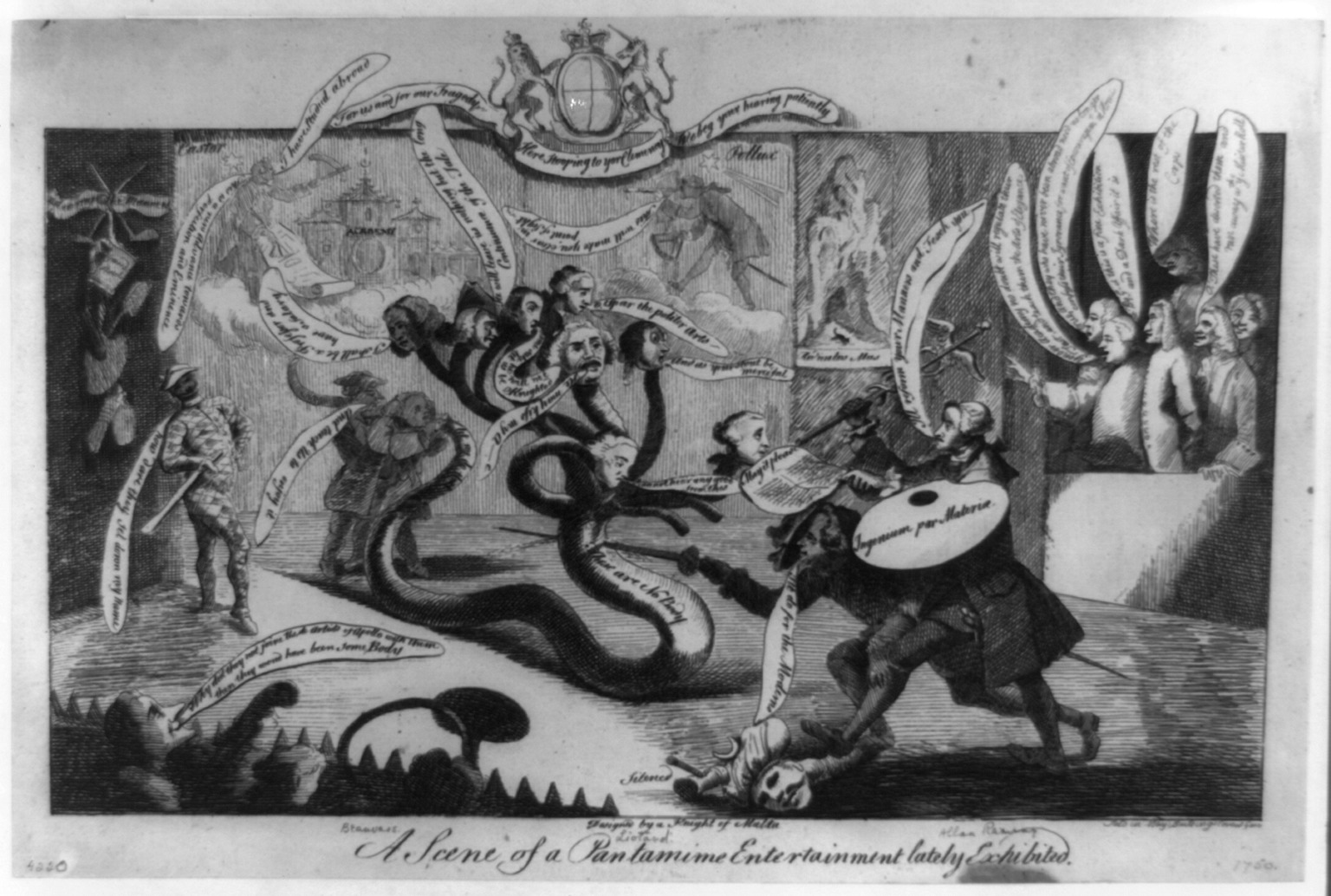
Satirical drawing of Sir William Chambers, one of the founders, trying to slay the 8-headed hydra of the Incorporated Society of Artists

The painter Joshua Reynolds was made its first president, and Francis Milner Newton was elected the first secretary, a post he held for two decades until his resignation in 1788.

The instrument of foundation, signed by George III on 10 December 1768, named 34 founder members and allowed for a total membership of 40. The founder members were Reynolds, John Baker, George Barret, Francesco Bartolozzi, Giovanni Battista Cipriani, Augustino Carlini, Charles Catton, Mason Chamberlin, William Chambers, Francis Cotes, George Dance, Nathaniel Dance, Thomas Gainsborough, John Gwynn, Francis Hayman, Nathaniel Hone the Elder, Angelica Kauffman, Jeremiah Meyer, George Michael Moser, Mary Moser, Francis Milner Newton, Edward Penny, John Inigo Richards, Paul Sandby, Thomas Sandby, Dominic Serres, Peter Toms, William Tyler, Samuel Wale, Benjamin West, Richard Wilson, Joseph Wilton, Richard Yeo, Francesco Zuccarelli. William Hoare and Johann Zoffany were added to this list by the King in 1769.

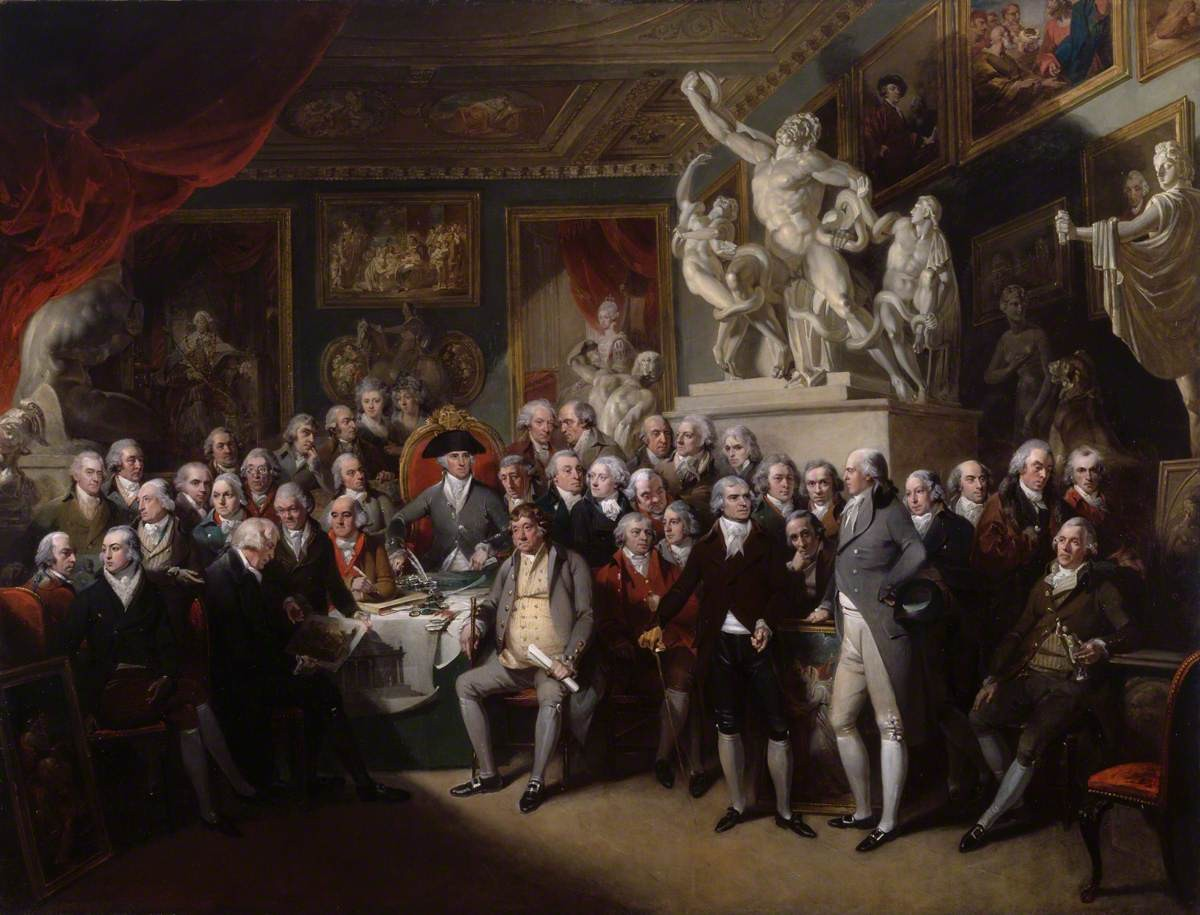
The Royal Academicians in General Assembly by Henry Singleton, 1795. Singleton depicts the Academicians at Somerset House with notable works of the collection behind them.

The Royal Academy was initially housed in cramped quarters in Pall Mall, although in 1771 it was given temporary accommodation for its library and schools in Old Somerset House, then a royal palace. In 1780, it was installed in purpose-built apartments in the first completed wing of New Somerset House, located in the Strand and designed by Chambers, the Academy's first treasurer. The Academy moved in 1837 to Trafalgar Square, where it occupied the east wing of the recently completed National Gallery (designed by another Academician, William Wilkins). These premises soon proved too small to house both institutions. In 1868, 100 years after the Academy's foundation, it moved to Burlington House, Piccadilly, where it remains.

The first Royal Academy Exhibition of Contemporary Art opened on 25 April 1769 and ran until 27 May 1769. The event was (and still is) open to anyone to participate anonymously, whether professional or amateur, male or female. In the first exhibition, 136 works of art were shown. The Royal Academy Summer Exhibition, has been staged annually without interruption to the present day.

During the 19th century, having a work selected for the annual exhibition was the first major goal of any artist. Due to its low price of one shilling, the annual Royal Exhibition was a very popular event during the 18th and 19th centuries. In 1800 it was visited by half a million people.

In 1870, following the cessation of a similar annual exhibition at the British Institution, the Academy expanded its exhibition programme to include a temporary annual loan exhibition of Old Masters.

Britain's first public lectures on art were staged by the Royal Academy, as another way to fulfil its mission. Led by Reynolds, its first president, the first programme included a lecture by William Hunter.

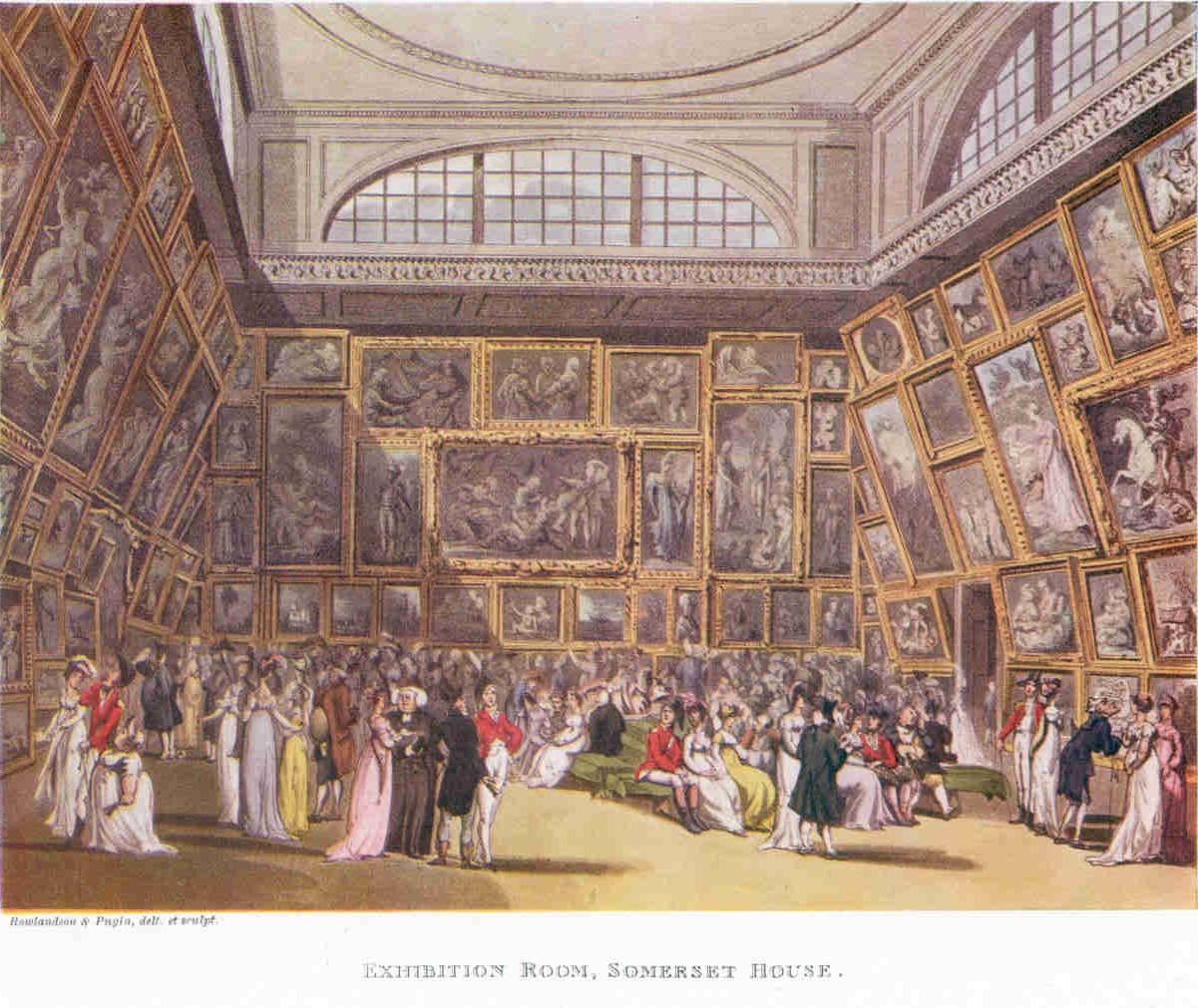
An early RA Summer Exhibition showing the Great Room, with the Prince of Wales (with a red coat) and Reynols to his right with his ear trumpet.

During the 19th century, the Royal Academy dominated artistic taste and defined what was to be considered "of a high standard". During the first half of the 19th century this standard was based on Reynolds art doctrine, called "the grand manner" or "the grand style".

In 2018, the Academy's 250th anniversary, the results of a major refurbishment were unveiled. The project began on 1 January 2008 with the appointment of David Chipperfield Architects. Heritage Lottery Fund support was secured in 2012. On 19 October 2016, the RA's Burlington Gardens site was closed to the public and renovations commenced. Refurbishment work included the restoration of 150 sash windows, glazing upgrades to 52 windows and the installation of two large roof lights. The "New RA" was opened to the public on 19 May 2018. The £56 million development includes new galleries, a lecture theatre, a public project space for students and a bridge linking the Burlington House and Burlington Gardens sites. As part of the process, 10,000 works from the RA's collection were digitised and made available online.

In 2026, the Royal Academy of Arts undertook a major redevelopment of its Collections Gallery at 6 Burlington Gardens. The project was designed to double the gallery's floor space and increase public access. This expansion was scheduled to be completed in 2027.

== Activities ==
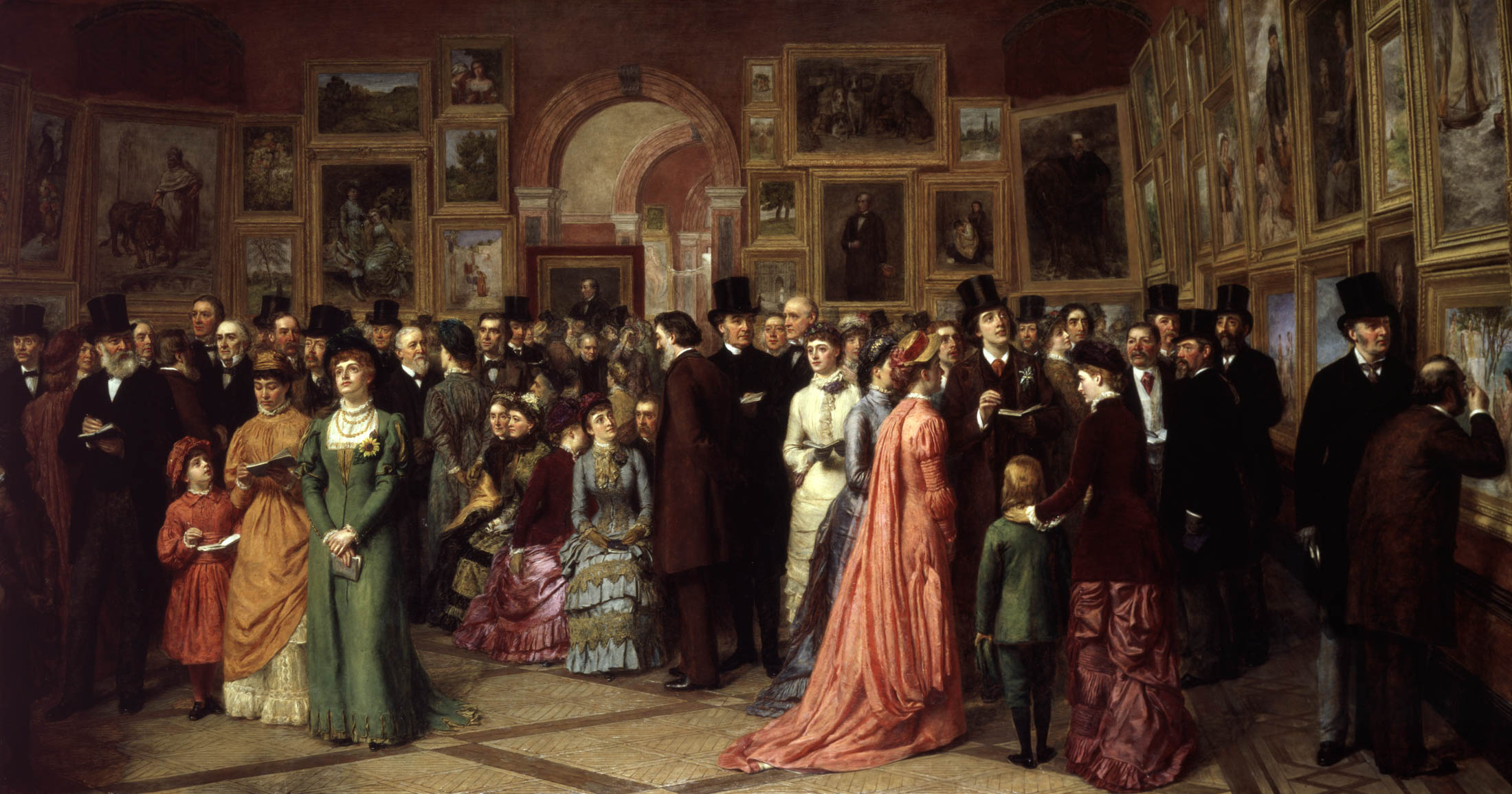
A Private View at the Royal Academy, 1881 by William Powell Frith, depicting Oscar Wilde and other Victorian worthies at a private view of the 1881 exhibition

=== Charitable status ===
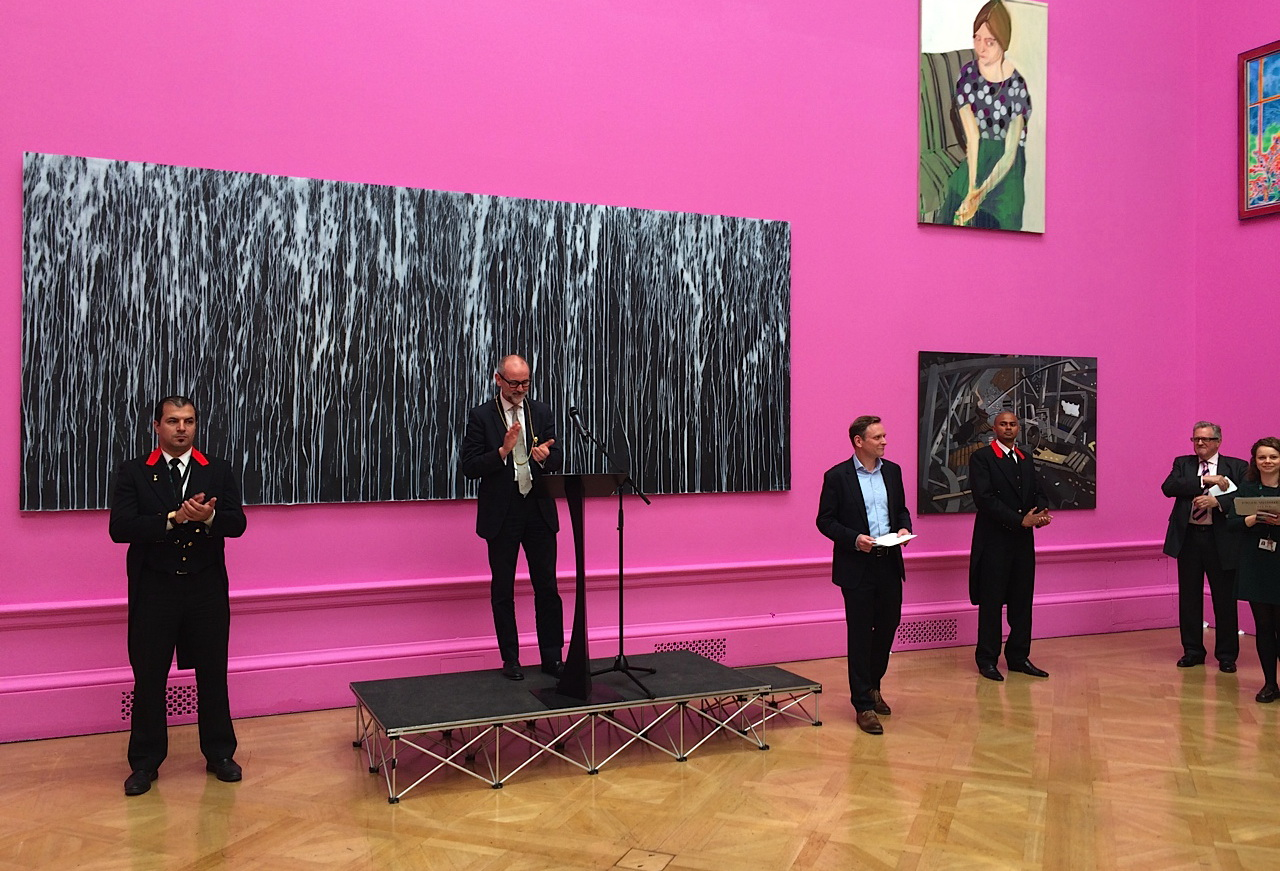
Christopher Le Brun, President of the RA, on "Varnishing Day", or the artists' opening of the Summer Exhibition, 2015

The Royal Academy receives funding from neither the State nor the Crown and operates as a charity. The RA's home in Burlington House is owned by the UK government and provided to the Academy on a peppercorn rent leasehold of 999 years.

=== Permanent collection and loans ===
One of its principal sources of revenue is hosting a programme of temporary loan exhibitions. These are comparable to those at the National Gallery, the Tate Gallery and leading art galleries outside the United Kingdom. In 2004 the highlights of the Academy's permanent collection went on display in the newly restored reception rooms of the original section of Burlington House, which are now known as the John Madejski Fine Rooms.

=== Exhibitions ===
Under the direction of former exhibitions secretary Sir Norman Rosenthal, the Academy has hosted ambitious exhibitions of contemporary art. In its 1997 "Sensation", it displayed the collection of work by Young British Artists owned by Charles Saatchi. The show was controversial for its display of Marcus Harvey's portrait of Myra Hindley, a convicted murderer. The painting was vandalised while on display.

In 2004, the Academy gained media attention due to a series of financial scandals and reports of a feud between Rosenthal and other senior staff. These problems resulted in the cancellation of what were expected to have been profitable exhibitions. In 2006, it attracted the press by erroneously placing only the support for a sculpture on display, and then justifying it being kept on display.

From 3 February to 28 April 2024, the RA showed the exhibition "Entangled Pasts, 1768-now" to reveal and discuss "connections between art associated with the Royal Academy of Arts and Britain's colonial histories." However, according to Colin Grant, in The Guardian, the exhibition "appears to be tame" though it attempts to "critique the exclusive and impenetrable RA."

=== Friends programme ===
In 1977, Sir Hugh Casson founded the Friends of the Royal Academy, a charity designed to provide financial support for the institution.

=== Literary collaborations ===
Pin Drop Studio hosts live events where well-known authors, actors and thinkers read a short story chosen as a response to the main exhibition programme. The literary evenings are hosted by Pin Drop Studio founder Simon Oldfield. Guests have included Graham Swift, Sebastian Faulks, Lionel Shriver, William Boyd, Will Self, Dame Eileen Atkins, Dame Siân Phillips, Lisa Dawn and Ben Okri.

The RA and Pin Drop Short Story Award is an open submission writing prize, held annually along similar principles of the Royal Academy Summer Exhibition. The award ceremony features a live reading of the winning story in its entirety by a special guest. Past winning stories have been read by Stephen Fry, Dame Penelope Wilton, Juliet Stevenson, and Gwendoline Christie.

== Presidents and officers ==
On 10 December 2019, Rebecca Salter was elected the first female President of the Royal Academy on the retirement of Sir Christopher Le Brun.

In September 2007, Sir Charles Saumarez Smith became Secretary and Chief Executive of the Royal Academy, a newly created post. Saumarez Smith stepped down from the role at the end of 2018, and it was announced that Axel Rüger, director of the Van Gogh Museum in Amsterdam, would fill the position in June 2019.

== Royal Academy Schools ==
The Royal Academy Schools form the oldest art school in Britain and have been an integral part of the Royal Academy of Arts since its foundation in 1768. A key principle of the RA Schools is that their three-year post-graduate programme is free of charge to every applicant offered a place.

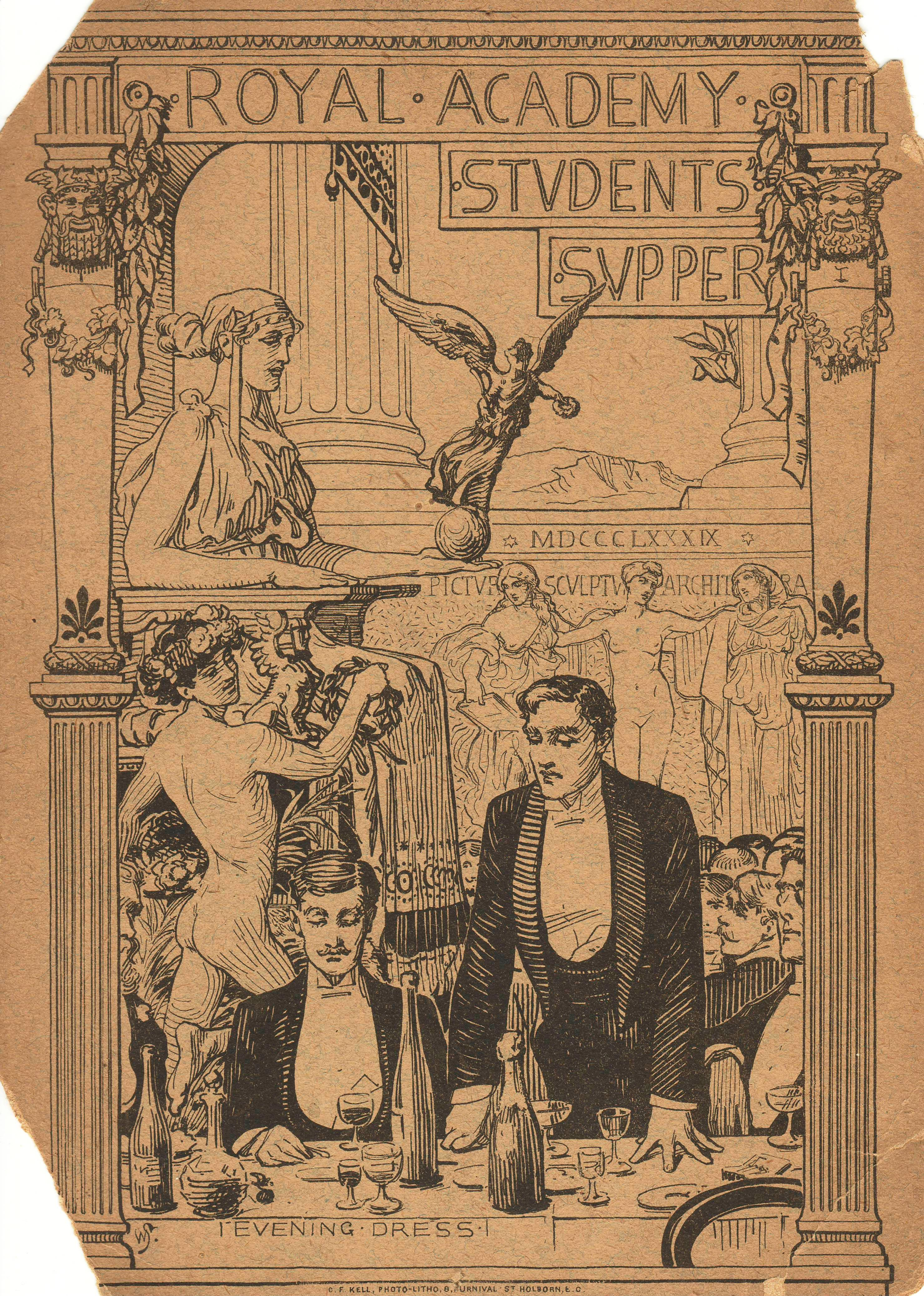
Royal Academy Students Supper 1889. Front page of menu.

The Royal Academy Schools were the first institution to provide professional training for artists in Britain. The Schools' programme of formal training was modelled on that of the French Académie de peinture et de sculpture, founded by Louis XIV in 1648. It was shaped by the precepts laid down by Sir Joshua Reynolds. In his fifteen Discourses delivered to pupils in the Schools between 1769 and 1790, Reynolds stressed the importance of copying the Old Masters, and of drawing from casts after the Antique and from the life model. He argued that such training would form artists capable of creating works of high moral and artistic worth. Professorial chairs were founded in Chemistry, Anatomy, Ancient History and Ancient Literature, the latter two being held initially by Samuel Johnson and Oliver Goldsmith.

In 1769, the first year of operation, the Schools enrolled 77 students. By 1830, more than 1,500 students had enrolled in the Schools, with an average intake of 25 students each year. They included men such as John Flaxman, J. M. W. Turner, John Soane, Thomas Rowlandson, William Blake, Thomas Lawrence, Decimus Burton, John Constable, George Hayter, David Wilkie, William Etty, Edwin Landseer, and Charles Lucy in 1838. The first woman to enroll as a student of the Schools was Laura Herford in 1860, and other female students have included Daisy Radcliffe Beresford. Charles Sims was expelled from the Schools in 1895. The Royal Academy made Sir Francis Newbolt the first Honorary Professor of Law in 1928.

In 2011 Tracey Emin was appointed Professor of Drawing, and Fiona Rae was appointed Professor of Painting – the first women professors to be appointed in the history of the Academy. Emin was succeeded by Michael Landy, and then David Remfry in 2016 while Rae was succeeded by Chantal Joffe in January 2016.

== Library, archive, and collections ==
The first president of the Royal Academy, Sir Joshua Reynolds, gave his noted self-portrait, beginning the Royal Academy collection. This was followed by gifts from other founding members, such as Gainsborough and Benjamin West. Subsequently, each elected Member was required to donate an artwork (known as a "Diploma Work") typical of his or her artistic output, and this practice continues today. Additional donations and purchases have resulted in a collection of approximately a thousand paintings and a thousand sculptures, which show the development of a British School of art. The Academy's collection of works on paper includes significant holdings of drawings and sketchbooks by artists working in Britain from the mid-18th century onwards, including George Romney, Lord Leighton and Dame Laura Knight.

The photographic collection consists of photographs of Academicians, landscapes, architecture and works of art. Holdings include early portraits by William Lake Price dating from the 1850s, portraits by David Wilkie Wynfield and Eadweard Muybridge's Animal Locomotion (1872–85).

=== Wall and ceiling paintings ===
Among the paintings decorating the walls and ceilings of the building are those of Benjamin West and Angelica Kauffman, in the entrance hall (Hutchison 1968, p. 153), moved from the previous building at Somerset House. In the centre is West's roundel The Graces Unveiling Nature, c. 1779, surrounded by panels depicting the elements, Fire, Water, Air and Earth. At each end are mounted two of Kauffman's circular paintings, Composition at the west end, and Painting or Colour and Genius or Invention at the east end.

=== Michelangelo's Taddei Tondo ===
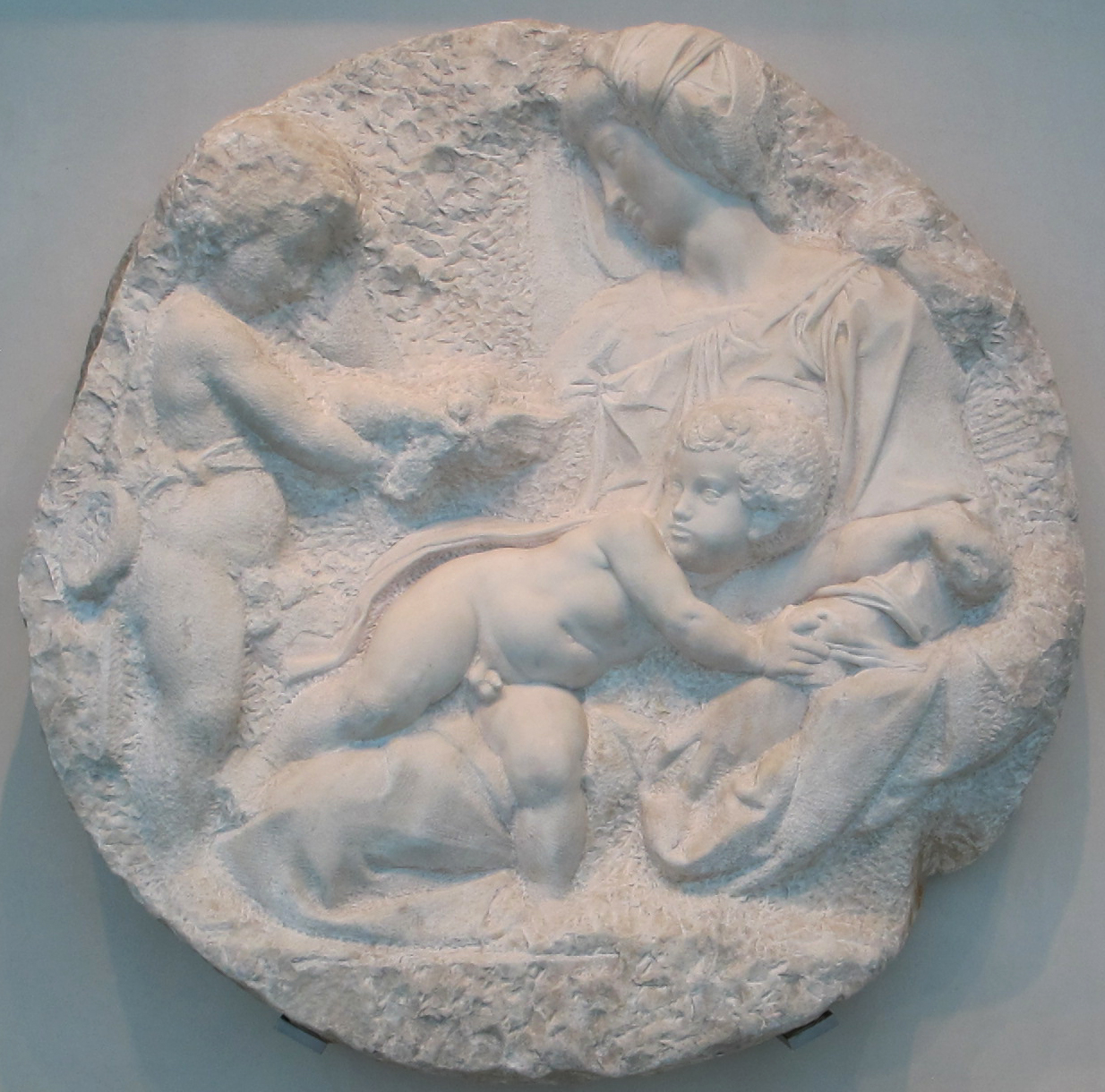
The Taddei Tondo

A prized possession of the Academy's collection is Michelangelo's Taddei Tondo, left to the Academy by Sir George Beaumont. The Tondo is usually on display in the Collection Gallery, which opened in May 2018. Carved in Florence in 1504–1506, it is the only marble by Michelangelo in the United Kingdom and represents the Virgin Mary and child with the infant Saint John the Baptist.

== War memorials ==
In the entrance portico are two war memorials. One is in memory of the students of the Royal Academy Schools who fell in World War I and the second commemorates the 2,003 men of the Artists Rifles who gave their lives in that war with a further plaque to those who died in World War II.

== Membership ==
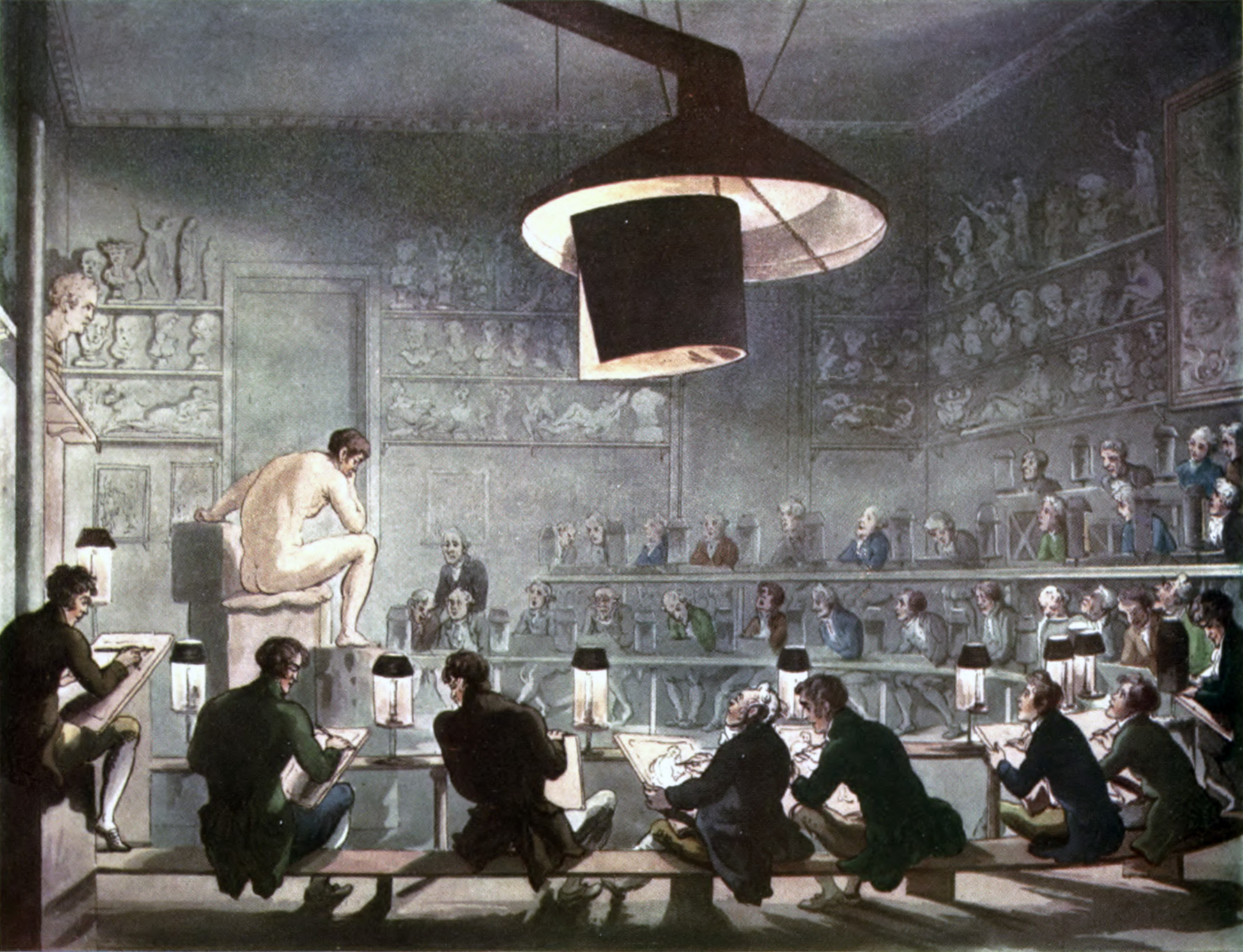
Life at the Royal Academy of Arts, from Microcosm of London, c. 1808

Membership of the Royal Academy is composed of up to 80 practising artists, each elected by ballot of the General Assembly of the Royal Academy, and known individually as Royal Academicians (RA). The Royal Academy is governed by these Royal Academicians. The 1768 Instrument of Foundation allowed the total membership of the Royal Academy to be 40 artists. Originally, engravers were completely excluded from the academy, but at the beginning of 1769, the category of Associate-Engraver was created. Their number was limited to six, and unlike other associates, they could not be promoted to full academicians. In 1853 membership of the Academy was increased to 42, and opened to engravers. In 1922, 154 years after the founding of the Royal Academy, Annie Swynnerton became the first woman Associate of the Royal Academy.

== See also ==
- 6 Burlington Gardens
- Cork Street, behind the Royal Academy, with many art galleries
- Royal West of England Academy

== Sources ==
- Chisholm, Hugh, ed. (1911). "Academy, Royal" . Encyclopædia Britannica (11th ed.). Cambridge University Press.
- Hodgson, J. E.; Eaton, Fred A. (1905). The Royal academy and its members 1768–1830. London: Charles Scribner's Sons.
