= Marcus Harvey =

English artist and painter (born 1963)

Marcus Harvey (born 1963 in Leeds) is an English artist and painter, one of the Young British Artists (YBAs).

== Exhibitions ==
Harvey has shown work internationally in many exhibitions including "The Führer's Cakes" at Galleria Marabini in Bologna, "Snaps" and "White Riot" at White Cube in London, "Sex and the British" at Galerie Thaddaeus Ropac in Salzburg, "Crucible" a sculpture exhibition held inside Gloucester Cathedral, and "London Calling: Young British Artists Criss-Crossed" at Galleri Kaare Berntsen in Oslo. He was included in the original "Young British Artists" exhibition series at Saatchi Gallery in 1995 and was in other important YBA shows like "In the darkest hour there may be light" at Serpentine Galleries.

== Collections ==
Marcus has work in public collections including The Museum of Modern Art, New York; the Stedelijk Museum, Amsterdam; The British Council Collection, London; Foundation of Contemporary British Art, TX; and prominent lending private collections including the "Murder Me" collection of artist Damien Hirst, UK; the Saatchi Collection, UK; and the Logan Collection, San Francisco.

== Life and art ==
Marcus Harvey grew up in Moortown, a suburb of Leeds. He attended Allerton Grange High School, graduated from Goldsmiths College in 1986, and is also an alumnus of the Leeds College of Art. At that time he became a close friend of Damien Hirst. Harvey did not take part in the Freeze show as he had graduated from Goldsmiths earlier, but Hirst included him when he curated Some Went Mad, Some Ran Away (1994). Harvey's work attracted the attention of Charles Saatchi. He currently lives and works in London.

Beyond the studio, Marcus Harvey joined with fellow painter Peter Ashton Jones to form Turps Banana Magazine in 2005. Turps focuses on new writing about both art historical and contemporary painting, written entirely by contemporary practicing painters. The magazine is published twice a year with full colour reproductions and a commitment to no advertising. The cover design is in yellow, with the word "TURPS" and the iconic banana of Andy Warhol. In 2012, Turps Art School was founded to allow emerging and mid career painters to take a year painting intensive with other practicing painters, it has been heralded as an alternative model for arts education by Jonathan Jones for The Guardian in 2014 as "The renegade art school proving that painting is not dead."

Myra by Marcus Harvey (1995)

Harvey is known for his tabloid-provoking 9 by 11 feet (2.7 by 3.4 m) portrayal of Moors murderer Myra Hindley, created from handprints taken from a plaster cast of a child's hand, and shown in the Sensation exhibition at the Royal Academy of Art in 1997. The painting had to be temporarily removed from display for repair after it was attacked in two separate incidents on the opening day, in which ink and eggs were thrown at it. The Times newspaper's art critic, Richard Cork, wrote that:

Far from cynically exploiting her notoriety, Harvey's grave and monumental canvas succeeds in conveying the enormity of the crime she committed. Seen from afar, through several doorways, Hindley's face looms at us like an apparition. By the time we get close enough to realise that it is spattered with children's handprints, the sense of menace becomes overwhelming.

Harvey's current work combines painting, photography, and sculpture while exploring British iconography in pop culture, the landscape, and cultural history. These recent works include thick gestural figurative paintings made on top of and obscuring photographic prints of landscapes and figures. His new ceramics and bronzes are an amalgam of art historical and historical references making "collaged portraits" from Nelson to Margaret Thatcher and from Napoleon to Tony Blair. The work has been received as a more mature kind of politics in work that continues to explore the possibilities of gesture in medium specificity with his "urgent physicality."
