= Everyone I Have Ever Slept With 1963–1995 =

Sculpture by Tracey Emin

- The Tent
- Year: 1995
- Movement: Young British Artists
- Condition: Incinerated in Momart warehouse fire, 2004
- Owner: Charles Saatchi (until destruction)

Everyone I Have Ever Slept With 1963–1995 (1995), also known as The Tent, was an artwork by Tracey Emin. The work was a tent with the appliquéd names of, literally, everyone she had ever slept with (not necessarily had sex with). It achieved iconic status and was owned by Charles Saatchi. Since its destruction in the 2004 Momart London warehouse fire, Emin has refused to recreate the piece.

== History ==
Emin calls Everyone I Have Ever Slept With 1963–1995 "my tent" or "the tent" and considers it one of her two "seminal pieces", the other being My Bed; she has described both as "seminal, fantastic and amazing work".

Everyone I Have Ever Slept With 1963–1995 was a tent appliquéd with the 102 names of the people with whom she had slept as of 1995. The title is often misinterpreted as a euphemism for sexual partners, but was in fact intended more inclusively:

Some I'd had a shag with in bed or against a wall; some I had just slept with, like my grandma. I used to lay in her bed and hold her hand. We used to listen to the radio together and nod off to sleep. You don't do that with someone you don't love and don't care about.

Inside the tent

The names include family, friends, drinking partners, lovers and even two numbered foetuses. The name of Emin's ex-boyfriend Billy Childish could be seen prominently through the tent opening, as could "Roberto Navikas", a misspelling of Roberto Navickas, who Emin had encountered whilst at Maidstone College of Art. (Note: Navickas would later reference this error when re-entering the art world two decades later with works titled "The Lost C of Emin: The Discovery" and "The Lost C of Emin: A Reliquary".) The tent itself was square and blue; the shape reminiscent of the Shell Grotto, Margate, with which Emin was very familiar from childhood; on the tent's floor was the text, "With myself, always myself, never forgetting".

In a 2004 interview, Emin discussed her intent, stating it was about "abortion, rape, teenage sex, abuse and poverty". Emin shared her belief that people walked into the tent expecting to learn about her sexual partners but left thinking about "who they’ve slept with, who they’ve been intimate with, who they’ve loved, who’s hurt them, who abused them, who raped them."

The work was created during a relationship she had in the mid-1990s with Carl Freedman, who had been an early friend of, and collaborator with, Damien Hirst, and who had co-curated seminal Britart shows, such as Modern Medicine and Gambler. In 1995, Freedman curated the show Minky Manky at the South London Gallery, where the tent was first shown. At that time Emin had not achieved the level of fame she later did, and was mainly known in art circles; she was fortunate to be able to exhibit alongside better-known artists such as Hirst, Gilbert and George and Sarah Lucas. Emin described the genesis of the work, which turned out unexpectedly to be the show's highlight:

At that time Sarah [Lucas] was quite famous, but I wasn't at all. Carl said to me that I should make some big work as he thought the small-scale stuff I was doing at the time wouldn't stand up well. I was furious. Making that work was my way at getting back at him. One review was really funny, the journalist had written something like 'She's slept with everyone—even the curator'!

At that time Emin refused to sell work directly to Charles Saatchi because she disapproved of his advertising work for Margaret Thatcher, whom she accused of "crimes against humanity". Instead Saatchi bought it on the secondary market from a private dealer, Eric Franck, at a premium price of £40,000. Emin had originally sold it for £12,000. She reconciled with Saatchi in 1999. Art world gossip in 2001 was that Saatchi had been offered £300,000 for it; Emin's comment on this was, "He won't resell, but the art is his. He can do what he likes with it."

Saatchi exhibited the tent in the 1997 Sensation exhibition at the Royal Academy in London, and at the later staging of the exhibition at the Brooklyn Museum of Art in New York, on Chris Ofili's The Holy Virgin Mary.

=== Momart fire ===
In 2004, the tent was destroyed in a fire at the East London Momart warehouse, along with two of Emin's other works and 100 more from Saatchi's collection, including works by Hirst, Jake and Dinos Chapman and Martin Maloney. Many other works were also lost, including major pieces by Patrick Heron and William Redgrave. The public and media reaction was not sympathy but mockery and scorn, focusing on the Young British Artists, Hirst, the Chapman Brothers, and Emin, particularly her tent. Tabloid papers The Sun and the Daily Mail both stated they had already created their own replacement tents, and the latter's Godfrey Barker asked, "Didn't millions cheer as this 'rubbish' went up in flames?" The same implication gained applause on BBC Radio 4's Any Questions?; Hugo Rifkind in The Times thought similarly to The Independent's Tom Lubbock, who wrote:

It's odd to hear talk about irreplaceable losses. Really? You'd have thought that, with the will and the funding, many of these works were perfectly replaceable. It wouldn't be very hard for Tracey Emin to re-stitch the names of Every One I Have Ever Slept With on to a little tent (it might need some updating since 1995).

Emin took a phlegmatic view of her work's destruction, saying, "The news comes between Iraqi weddings being bombed and people dying in the Dominican Republic in flash floods, so we have to get it into perspective." But she was upset at the public reaction to the fire, pointing both to lack of cultural understanding—"The majority of the British public have no regard or no respect to what me and my peers do, to the point that they laugh at a disaster like a fire"—and to lack of compassion: "It is just not fair and it's not funny and it's not polite and it's bad manners. I would never laugh at a disaster like that—I just have some empathy and sympathy with people's loss."

She also said she could not remake the tent, because "I had the inclination and inspiration 10 years ago to make that, I don't have that inspiration and inclination now ... My work is very personal, which people know, so I can't create that emotion again—it's impossible." At her 2008 Edinburgh retrospective show, she said that after the fire, the Saatchi Gallery had offered her £1 million (the amount of the insurance payment) to remake the tent, but that, although she had recreated some small pieces for the retrospective, to have remade the tent "would just be silly".

In May 2009, Dinos Chapman said that he and his brother Jake recreated the tent. Emin and the Chapmans are represented by White Cube gallery in London. In The Independent, Jerome Taylor questioned whether this was a publicity stunt.

=== Burn Baby Burn ===
In collaboration with illusionist and self-proclaimed psychic Uri Geller, artist Stuart Semple collected remains from the Momart fire site and packaged them into eight plastic boxes under the title Burn Baby Burn; the boxes carried on them slogans in pink lettering, including "RIP YBA," which referred to the Young British Artists, amongst whom Emin is classified. Semple claimed that fragments of Emin's tent were among the debris collected. The assemblage was offered to, but rejected by, the Tate gallery.

== See also ==
- My Bed
