= Catherine Story =

English artist

Catherine Story (born 1968) is an artist living and working in London. Story studied at Royal Academy Schools.

In October 2009, Story had her first solo exhibition Pylon in London at the Carl Freedman Gallery, followed by a second solo show Angeles in November, 2011 of new paintings and sculpture.

In 2013, Story exhibited at Tate Britain in 'Painting Now'. In 2018, Story had a solo show 'Shadow' at the PEER in London.
