= Rae Jenkins =

Welsh violinist (1903–1985)

MBE Rae Jenkins
- Born: Henry Horatio Jenkins; 19 April 1903
- Died: 29 March 1985 (aged 81)
- Genres: Light music
- Occupation: Conductor
- Instrument: Violin

Rae Jenkins MBE FRAM, born Henry Horatio Jenkins (19 April 1903 – 29 March 1985) was a Welsh violinist and later conductor of light music, notably with the BBC Midland Light Orchestra (1942–1946), the BBC Variety Orchestra (from 1946), and as principal conductor of the BBC Welsh Orchestra (1950–1965). In 1955 Hubert Clifford, Head of Light Music at the BBC, called Jenkins "the most gifted and experienced conductor of light music in the country".

Jenkins was born at Ammanford in 1903, the son of a coal miner. Given a violin when four years old, he was first violin in his local theatre orchestra by the age of eleven. However at the age of 14 he was sent down the coal mines as a pit boy. His parents eventually found the means to send him to the Royal Academy of Music at the age of 17, where he studied viola under Lionel Tertis and conducting under Sir Henry Wood.

His first broadcast was with the Reginald King Orchestra in 1930. He was appointed conductor of the BBC Midland Light Orchestra in 1942, putting on "at least a thousand" programmes from the Midlands before leaving to take over the BBC Variety Orchestra from Charles Shadwell in 1946. Jenkins worked on radio programmes, including It's That Man Again (ITMA). He was also an authority on music of gypsy origin.

He appeared as a castaway on the BBC Radio programme Desert Island Discs on 6 September 1965. He was a Member of the Order of the British Empire (MBE) and a Fellow of the Royal Academy of Music (FRAM).

A portrait of Jenkins was painted by William Redgrave. A plaque in Ammanford Town Hall commemorates him. It reads:

In loving memory of

Rae Jenkins M.B.E. F.R.A.M.

1903–1985 Ammanford

born musician who devoted

his life to music

conductor of B.B.C. Midland, Variety and

Welsh Orchestras

== Biography ==
- Johns-Davies, Jayne Marilyn (2006). Rae Jenkins FRAM, MBE: the life story of Welsh conductor and musician 1903 to 1985.
