= William Redgrave =

British sculptor

William Redgrave (1903–1986) was a British sculptor. His major work The Event was mostly destroyed in the 2004 Momart warehouse fire.

== Biography ==
William Redgrave was born in Little Ilford, Essex. He worked for the BBC for a time. In World War II he was an air raid warden. With Peter Lanyon he then ran an art school in St Ives; Francis Bacon rented a studio from them and, in 1957, encouraged Redgrave to take up sculpture.

His girlfriend in the 1960s was Jenny Pearson, who was a feature writer for The Times at one stage in her life. In Chelsea she saw him create his major work. This was The Event, a bronze triptych, measuring 56 x 124" overall, weighing a tonne and consisting of 228 figures arranged in 49 different scenes each with a theme, such as flirtation or gang murder. It took the artist three years to make. When it was finished, he said, ""Some great outside thing is happening to these people—something we all fear might be going to happen." The Scottish poet Alan Bold wrote a poem about the work and said the figures were "forced/To face the judgement of a world they represent." The Event was first shown at the Royal Academy in 1966. The Daily Telegraph reviewed it as "the most successful piece of sculpture seen at the Academy for many years." Giacomo Manzù's bronze doors for St Peter's, Rome were cited as a comparison. Sir John Rothenstein, Director of the Tate Gallery also expressed admiration. It was scheduled for installation in the new Kensington and Chelsea Town Hall, but this plan was cancelled because of financial restraints.

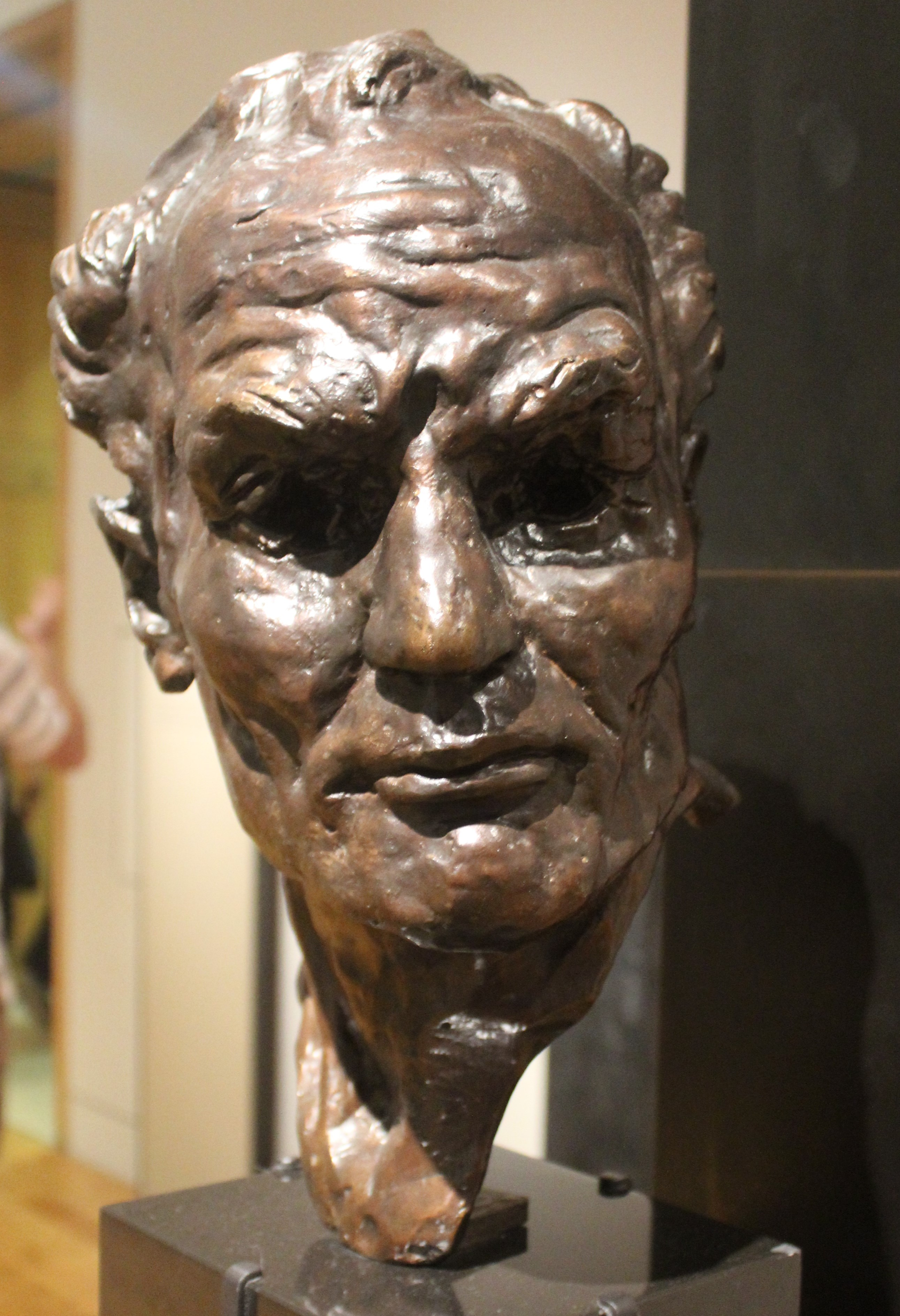
Henry Cooper by Redgrave

In the 1970s, Redgrave did portrait heads of a number of noted people, including Henry Cooper, Diana Rigg and Laurence Olivier. The bust of Olivier is now in the Olivier Theatre Foyer, Royal National Theatre in the South Bank complex. The bust of Henry Cooper is in the collection of the National Portrait Gallery in London.

In 1998 The Event was part of a retrospective at the Roy Miles Gallery in west London. Redgrave's family then put the work into storage with Momart, and were working on plans for a permanent display of it. In 2004 it was in the east London Momart warehouse destroyed by fire, along with works by Tracey Emin, Jake and Dinos Chapman, and Damien Hirst, amongst others. Critic Bevis Hillier called it "by far the greatest loss" of the fire, but it was initially not mentioned in news reports, until publicised by the campaigning art group the Stuckists on their web site (billed as a "world exclusive"). Five days before the fire, the family had paid £5,508 in back fees.

Remarkably, although the left hand side of the triptych was completely destroyed, the sculptor's son, Christopher Redgrave, was able to personally retrieve, in two trips, at least 30 of the 228 figures in good shape – about a third of the central panel, as well as other fragments, though cutting his hands badly on broken glass in the process. He described the experience:

There was a smell of rotting food, rotting chips, rotting meat from one of the units Momart shared the building with ... There were bits of glass hanging from the roof. I had to climb over steel girders. It looked like a twisted rollercoaster that had crashed.

As far as is known he is the only person out of the artists or artists' relatives to have been to the site; he said, "this building was inappropriate for what they are doing. There's no way around that."
