= Cai Yuan and Jian Jun Xi =

British artists

Mad For Real
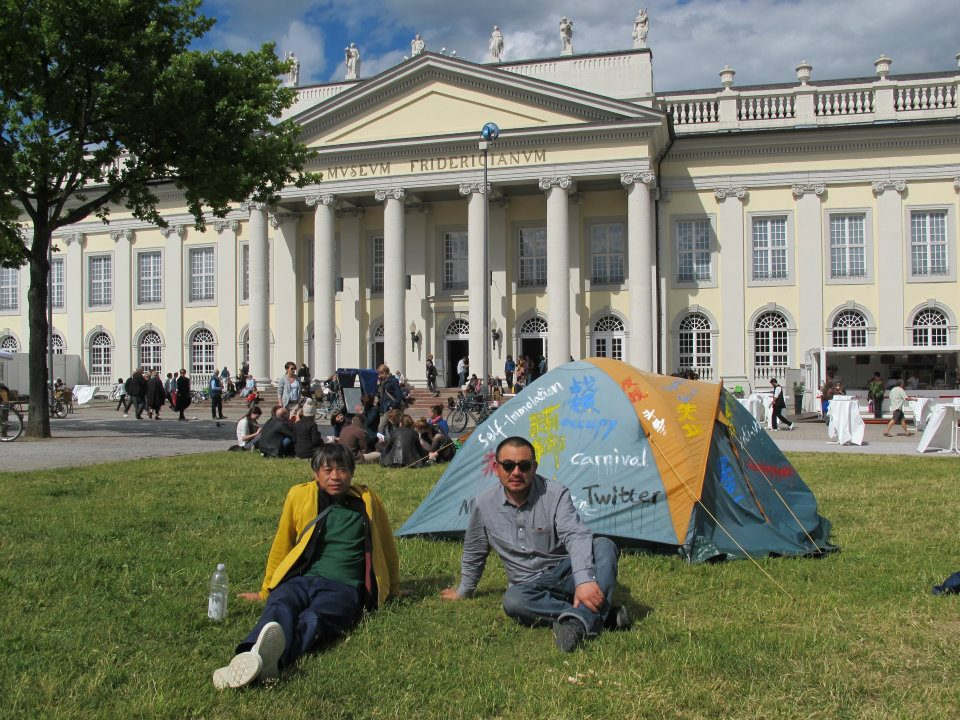
- Jian Jun Xi & Cai Yuan outside the Fridericianum museum, Kassel, Germany.
- Known for: Performance art, installation art, intervention art
- Notable work: Two Naked Men Jump into Tracey's Bed, Urination on Duchamp's Fountain

Cai Yuan
- Born: 1956 (age 69–70); China
- Education: Nanjing College of Art, Chelsea College of Art and Design, Royal College of Art, London
- Known for: Performance art, painting
- Notable work: Two Naked Men Jump into Tracey's Bed

Jian Jun Xi
- Born: 1962 (age 63–64); China
- Education: Central Academy of Applied Arts in Beijing, Goldsmiths College
- Known for: Performance art
- Notable work: Two Naked Men Jump into Tracey's Bed, Urination on Duchamp's Fountain

Cai Yuan and Jian Jun Xi are two Chinese-born artists, based in Britain, who work together under the name Mad For Real. They have enacted (unofficial) events at the Venice Biennale and the Turner Prize, where, in 1999, they jumped onto Tracey Emin's My Bed installation. Originally finding fame as performance artists specialising in art intervention, they have since diversified, engaging in numerous works in both Asia and Europe.

== Lives ==
Born in China, Cai Yuan (1956) and JJ Xi (1962), have been based in the UK since the 1980s. Cai Yuan trained in oil painting at Nanjing College of Art, and gained a BA from Chelsea College of Art and Design in 1989, and his MA from the Royal College of Art, London in 1991. He won the Gordon Gunn prize for his work at the United Society of Artists exhibition in 1984.

J. J. Xi trained at the Central Academy of Applied Arts in Beijing and later at Goldsmiths College.

They started working as a performance duo in 1999 with Two Artists Jump on Tracey Emin’s Bed (1999).

== Career ==
=== Two Naked Men Jump into Tracey's Bed ===
At 12:58 pm on 25 October 1999, Cai Yuan and Jian Jun Xi jumped on Tracey Emin's installation My Bed, a work incorporating memorabilia on and around an unmade bed, in the Turner Prize at Tate Britain. They called their performance Two Naked Men Jump into Tracey's Bed (although in fact they kept their trousers on). They had in mind including some "critical sex", as they considered "a sexual act was necessary to fully respond to Tracey's piece", although this part of their intention was not fulfilled. A visitor reported, "Everyone at the exhibition started clapping as they thought it was part of the show. At first, the security people didn't know what to do." It was not clear to some whether the action was part of Emin's display or even a protest against the current visit of Chinese leader Jiang Zemin.

Another visitor commented, "After a few minutes of hopping about and shouting I think they ran out of things to do. If they had tried to wreck it, or stolen the vodka or her knickers, I might have felt differently. It made my weekend." The men only had time to start a pillow fight and attempt a swig from one of the empty vodka bottles next to the bed before they were apprehended. The police and security guards were booed when they took the pair away. Cai and Xi were arrested for their action, but no charges were pressed, since "neither the gallery nor the artist had any desire to bring the matter further".

Cai considered that, although Emin's work was strong, it was nevertheless institutionalised and said, "We want to push the idea further. Our action will make the public think about what is good art or bad art. We didn't have time to do a proper performance. I thought I should touch the bed and smell the bed." He had various words written in Chinese and English on his body, such as "Internationalism", "Freedom", and "Idealism". Xi said that the work was not interesting enough and also that he wanted to push it further, increasing its significance and sensationalism.

One of the words prominent along the length of Cai's torso was "Anti-Stuckism", although the Stuckists had themselves been critical of Emin's art. However, Cai and Xi's explanation is that they were not anti-Emin's type of work (which they merely wanted to "improve"—"We are simply trying to react to the work and the self-promotion implicit in it"), but were opposed to the Stuckists, who are anti-performance art. According to Fiachra Gibbons of The Guardian, the event "will go down in art history as the defining moment of the new and previously unheard of Anti-Stuckist Movement".

The Tate's official pronouncement was, "The work has now been restored and the exhibition will open to the public as usual at 10 a.m.", but they would not be drawn on the nature of the restoration.

=== Other performances ===
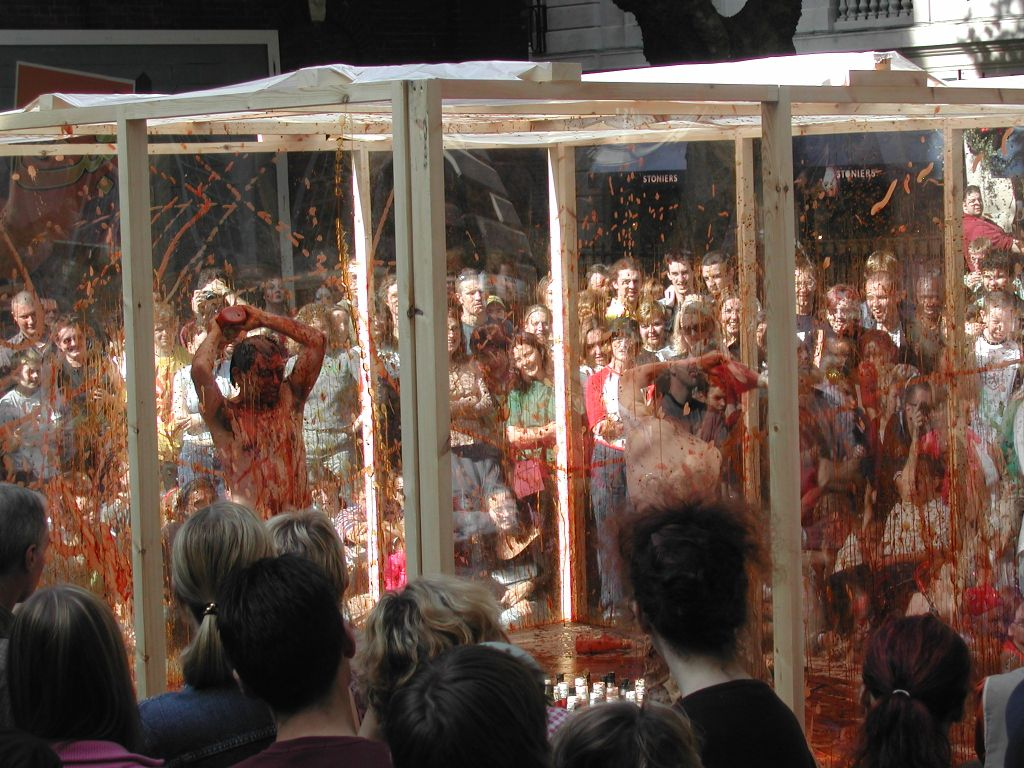
Yuan Cai and Jian Jun Xi performing at the Bluecoat Arts Centre, Liverpool.

In 1997, they erected fake street signs in an attempt to mislead high-profile visitors to the Venice Biennale.

At Goldsmiths College in London they scattered £1,200 around a room to point to the commercialism and greed of the art market. The audience scrambled on the floor to pick up the money.

In spring 2000, the artists returned to the Tate – specifically, to the Tate Modern – in an attempt to urinate into a 1964 artist-authorized replica of Marcel Duchamp's Fountain, a urinal laid on its back and signed "R. Mutt". The Tate denied that the attempt succeeded. The sculpture is now enclosed in a transparent box.

== See also ==
- Conceptual art
