= Martin Maloney (artist) =

English artist

Saplings by Martin Maloney

Martin Maloney (born 1961) is a contemporary English artist.

== Life and work ==
Martin Maloney was born in London. He attended the University of Sussex 1980–1983, Central Saint Martins College of Art and Design 1988–1991 and Goldsmiths College 1991–1992

Maloney practises deliberately "bad" painting, where images (mainly figures) are achieved with apparently inept draughtsmanship and crude painting. Through his style, colours, and subject matter, Maloney's paintings record everyday experiences and moments of awkward intimacy. He often incorporates references to art history, from Vermeer to Georg Baselitz.

Art historian Julian Stallabrass said that Maloney's work was "childishly sweet and banal figure paintings". Maloney was an exhibitor in the Saatchi Collection on display as Sensation, held at the Royal Academy, London, in 1997. He was also exhibited in the New Neurotic Realism show held at the Saatchi Gallery.

Twenty artworks by Maloney were destroyed in the 2004 fire at the Momart storage warehouse.

Maloney's artwork includes: Stroller, Cul de Sac, Public Sculpture and Planters.
