= Lindsey Mendick =

British artist

Lindsey Mendick (born 1987) is a British artist who works primarily in ceramics, often within large-scale installations. Her practice reinterprets the associations of clay with domesticity and decoration, drawing on autobiography, popular culture, and explorations of gender.

She received an MA in Sculpture from the Royal College of Art in 2017, after completing a BA at Sheffield Hallam University. Her exhibitions have been staged at venues including Yorkshire Sculpture Park and the Hayward Gallery, and she won the Sky Arts Award for Visual Art in 2024.

Works by Mendick are held in the Arts Council Collection (UK) and the UK Government Art Collection.

Mendick co-founded Quench, a not-for-profit project space in Margate established to present exhibitions and support early-career artists. Quench is now run by Mendick, Gemma Pharo and Guy Oliver.

== Selected work and exhibitions ==
Her installation Till Death Do Us Part (2022) was commissioned for the Hayward Gallery exhibition Strange Clay: Ceramics in Contemporary Art. The work featured wedding-themed ceramic tableaux, combining humour and grotesque imagery to explore intimacy and domesticity.

Her solo exhibition Where the Bodies Are Buried opened at Yorkshire Sculpture Park in 2023. The show transformed the galleries into a domestic interior haunted by references to soap operas and popular culture, with large-scale ceramic figures and furnishings.

In 2022 she presented Off With Her Head at Carl Freedman Gallery, Margate, an immersive installation that combined ceramics, video projections and theatrical sets to stage a surreal narrative around women's roles throughout history.

Her exhibition Hot Mess at the Sainsbury Centre (2024) filled the galleries with autobiographical ceramic sculptures referencing nightlife, chaos and vulnerability.

In 2025 Mendick created Wicked Game for Kenilworth Castle, a site-specific installation engaging with Elizabeth I's court, staging her ceramic figures within the historic interiors.

In the summer of 2026 Mendick presented 'Where You End And I Begin' at Carl Freedman Gallery, Margate
