= FIH Group =

British conglomerate, owns the Falkland Islands Company

FIH Group plc
- Formerly: Falkland Island Holdings (1997–2016); FOSSILDRIVE PLC (1997)
- Type: Public limited company
- Traded as: AIM: FIH
- Industry: Conglomerate holding Company
- Founded: 1997
- Headquarters: Bishops Stortford, England
- Area served: UK and Falkland Islands
- Key people: Robin Williams; Stuart Munro (CEO)
- Revenue: £38.56 Million (2015)
- Operating income: £3.93 Million (2015)
- Net income: £3.14 Million (2015)
- Total assets: £57.67 Million (2015)
- Total equity: £36.69 Million (2015)
- Number of employees: 357 (2015)
- Subsidiaries: Falkland Islands Company Momart Gosport Ferry
- Website: www.fihplc.com

FIH Group plc (stylized as FIH group) or FIH (formerly Falkland Islands Holdings) is a British conglomerate which operates in the Falkland Islands through the Falkland Islands Company. Its other main businesses are the Portsmouth Harbour Ferry Company, which operates the Gosport Ferry in the south of England, and a London-based art storage and transport company called Momart.

== History ==
=== 1851–1997: Falkland Island Company ===
Falkland Island Company (FIC) was founded in 1851 and royaly authorized by 1852, by Samuel Lafone.

=== 1997–2016: Falkland Island Holdings ===
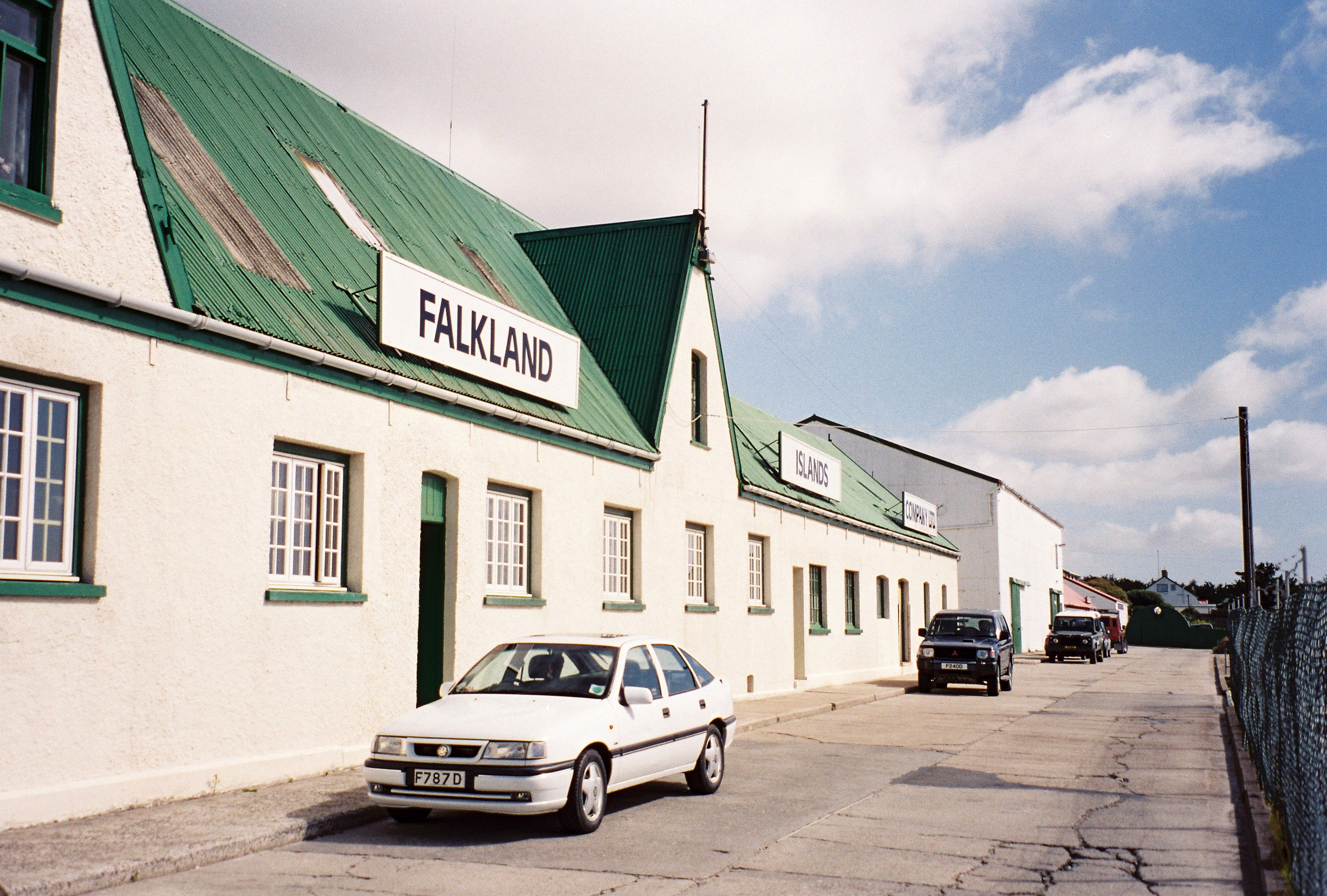
Falkland Islands Company's historical building in Stanley, Falkland Islands

In 1997, Anglo United, which had an unsustainable amount of debt, underwent a capital reconstruction and distributed shares in Falkland Islands Holdings plc to its shareholders. Anglo United shareholders received 1 share in FIH for every 300 shares of AU.

in January 1998 FIH was first listed on the London Stock Exchange, with £2m of debt the issue price of 100p. The company was capitalised at £6 million. In January 2003 FIH share listing moved to the AIM market.

In February 2004 Falkland Gold and Minerals Limited (FGML) was established with financing to carry out an aero magnetic survey of the Falklands to exploit its exploration licence covering the whole of the Island. In June 2004 Falkland Oil and Gas Limited (FOGL) was established with financing to carry out a 2D seismic survey over its 33,000 km^{2} offshore licence to the South and East of the Falklands. In October 2004 FOGL raised £12m and its shares were admitted to AIM, capitalising the company at £32m. In December 2004 FGML raised £10m and shares admitted to AIM, FOGL was granted an exploration licence over a further 50,000 km^{2} to the South and East of the islands and FIH acquired Portsmouth Harbour Ferry Company for £7.5m.

In June 2005 FOGL raised £10 million through an institutional placing. FIH subscribes £2m increasing its share holding to 18.3%. In February 2006, FIH sold 1.8m shares in (FOGL), realising £2.4m and reducing its holding back to 16.3%. In December 2006, FOGL raised an £8m convertible loan to fund its ongoing exploration programme.

In January 2007 FIH sold 100% of its holding in FGML for 6p per share to RAB Capital and in October 2007 FOGL announced a farm-in deal with BHP Billiton to fund drilling programme in South Atlantic.

In March 2008 FIH acquired 100% of Momart, a UK market leader in the handling and storage of fine art and antiquities, for £10.27m.

In November 2009 FIH sold 3 million shares in FOGL after the placing earlier in the month generating proceeds of £3.6 million and a profit of £3.0 million at a price of 119 pence per share. This reduced FIH's holding to 12.0 million shares (8.2%).

In January 2012 FIH participated in the placing of new shares by FOGL by subscribing for 2 million new shares at a cost of £0.86 million (43 pence per share). FIH's holding in FOGL shares was increased to 14 million shares (4.4%).

In July 2012, FIH raised £10.0 million gross from a share issue at 320p per share. £8.0 million was subscribed by Blackfish Capital and £2.0 million was raised from an Open Offer to the existing shareholders. The proceeds from the share issue were used to develop the group's assets in the Falkland Islands in anticipation of the economic growth that the board believed would follow. In July 2012, FIH sold 1.2 million shares in FOGL for £1.01 million (86 pence per share), generating a profit of £0.77 million and reducing its holding to 12.8 million shares (4.0%).

In March 2015 FIH sold 7.825 million shares in FOGL for £1.6 million (29 pence per share), generating a profit of £0.7 million and reducing its holding to 5.0 million shares (0.9%).

In May 2015, the last 5 million shares in Falkland Oil & Gas ("FOGL") were sold for £1.4 million, generating a profit of £0.4 million for the Group. With the sale of these shares, FIH completed the realisation of its investment in FOGL. Over the 10 years since FOGL's flotation, FIH has generated over £8 million in cash proceeds and £5 million in profits from its investment in FOGL.

In January 2016 the company had a capital reorganisation involving a share consolidation (1,000 to 1) and split (1 to 1,000) decreasing the number of shareholders from 2,139 to 510.

=== 2016–present: FIH Group ===
September 2016 the group changed its name to FIH Group plc to more properly reflect the balance of the group's activities which are now predominantly in Europe and the UK. Despite this change of name, the group's Falklands business, the Falklands Islands Company ("FIC"), remains a core part of the Group.

In February 2017 Staunton Holdings made a takeover offer of £3 per share with a total value of £37.3 Million. In March, Dolphin fund requested information about the company in order to make its own takeover bid. In response Staunton reduced the requirement of 90% of the share capital to be purchased from the offer to 50%. The announcement of a potential takeover by an Argentinian group gained press coverage due to the highly political nature of the islands. In April, Staunton Holdings' offer failed to gain enough shares, resulting in a withdrawal of the takeover and sale of Blackfish's (a Staunton affiliated company) 20% shareholding in the company.

In November 2021 the Board announced that John Foster would step down from his position as CEO after 17 years and be succeeded by Stuart Munro.

== Financial information and holdings ==
FIH shares have traded on the Alternative Investment Market (AIM) in London since 13 January 2003. In July 2010, FIH's market value was around £36m. It made a pretax profit of £5.669m in the year ended 31 March 2010 on revenue of £29.224m. £3.3m came from the sale of shares in Falkland Oil and Gas in November 2009.

=== Subsidiaries ===
Company	Sector	Ownership %	Acquisition Date	Price paid
Falkland Islands Company	Diversified	100%	1997 (From foundation)	N/A
Falkland Islands Trading Company Ltd: Falkland Island Shipping Limited (Trading as Darwin Shipping); Erebus Limited; Paget Limited	Shipping	100%	1997 (From foundation)	N/A
Portsmouth Harbour Ferry Company Ltd: Gosport Ferry Ltd; Clarence Marine Engineering Ltd; Portsea Harbour Company Ltd; Portsmouth Harbour Waterbus Company Ltd	Passenger transport	100%	December 2004	£7.5 Million
Momart International PLC: Momart Ltd; Dadart	Art storage and transportation	100%	5 March 2008	£10.27 Million
South Atlantic Construction Company Limited (SAtCO)	Construction	50%	June 2012 (co-founder)	£50,000

=== Past holdings and investments ===
Company	Sector	Ownership % (Peak)	Date of Acquisition	Date of disposal
Falkland Gold and Minerals Limited	Metal Exploration	14.4%	February 2004	January 2007
Falkland Oil and Gas	Oil and Gas Exploration	18.3%	October 2004	May 2015

== See also ==
- Economy of the Falkland Islands
