= Fucking Hell (Chapman) =

2008 installation artwork

- Artist: Jake and Dinos Chapman
- Year: 2008
- Medium: Installation

Fucking Hell is a 2008 installation artwork by Jake and Dinos Chapman depicting a monumental battle of miniature skeletons, Nazis, and others. It is a recreation of their 1998–2000 Hell, which was lost in a fire. It sold for £7.5 million.
