= My Bed =

1998 artwork by Tracey Emin

- Artist: Tracey Emin
- Year: 1998
- Medium: Found happening
- Movement: Postmodernism
- Subject: Depression, surrealism, originality, conceptualism

My Bed is a raw installation by the British artist Tracey Emin. The work consists of her bed with bedroom objects in a disheveled state. First created in 1998, it was exhibited at the Tate Gallery in 1999 as one of the shortlisted works for the Turner Prize. Although it did not win the prize, it gained much media attention and its notoriety has persisted. It was sold at auction by Christie’s in July 2014 for £2,546,500.

== Inspiration ==
The idea for My Bed was inspired by a sexually intensive yet depressive phase in Emin's life when she had remained in bed for four days without eating or drinking anything but alcohol. Emin ardently defended My Bed against critics who, treating it as a farce, claimed that anyone could exhibit an unmade bed. To these claims, she retorted, "Well, they didn't, did they? No one had ever done that before."

== Reactions ==
The artwork generated considerable media furore, particularly over the fact that the bedsheets were stained with bodily secretions, while on the floor were items from the artist's room, such as condoms, underwear with menstrual blood stains, other detritus, and functional, everyday objects, including a pair of slippers. The bed was presented in the state that Emin claimed it was after she'd been languishing in it for several days; at the time, she was suffering from suicidal depression brought on by relationship difficulties.

Two performance artists, Yuan Cai and Jian Jun Xi, jumped on the bed with bare torsos to "improve" the work, which they claimed had not gone far enough. They called their performance Two Naked Men Jump into Tracey's Bed. The two men also had a pillow fight on the bed for around fifteen minutes, to some applause from the crowd, before being removed by security guards. The artists were temporarily detained but no further legal action was taken. Prior to its Tate Gallery showing, the work had appeared elsewhere, including Japan, where there were variant surroundings, including, at one stage, a hangman's noose hanging over the bed. This was not present when it was displayed at the Tate.

Craig Brown wrote a piece parodying My Bed titled "My Turd" for Private Eye. Emin's ex-boyfriend, former Stuckist artist Billy Childish, stated that he also had an old bed of hers in the shed which he would make available for £20,000.

My Bed was described in 2010 by Duncan Ballantyne-Way as "[s]till filthy, still repulsive, and still one of the most moving works of contemporary art." Journalist Alina Cohen described it as "one of contemporary art's most striking depictions of vulnerability, a self-portrait that doesn't veer from the messiness of depression and heartbreak." Writing for The New Yorker, Rebecca Mead praised My Bed for how it "spoke to the experience of any woman who came of age in a similar cultural climate" and "enabled its creator to assert her power and self-reliance."

== Sale history and value ==
My Bed was bought by Charles Saatchi for £150,000 and displayed as part of the first exhibition when the Saatchi Gallery opened its new premises at County Hall, London (which it has now vacated). Saatchi also installed the bed in a dedicated room in his own home.

When it was announced, in May 2014, that the work was to be auctioned, David Maupin, Emin's dealer in New York, described the £800,000 – £1.2 million estimate as too low. When auctioned by Christie's in July 2014, the piece was sold for a little over £2.5 million.

== See also ==
- Everyone I Have Ever Slept With 1963–1995
- Sir Nicholas Serota Makes an Acquisitions Decision
- Empathy and Prostitution
