= Tracey Emin =

English artist (born 1963)

Dame Tracey Emin DBE RA
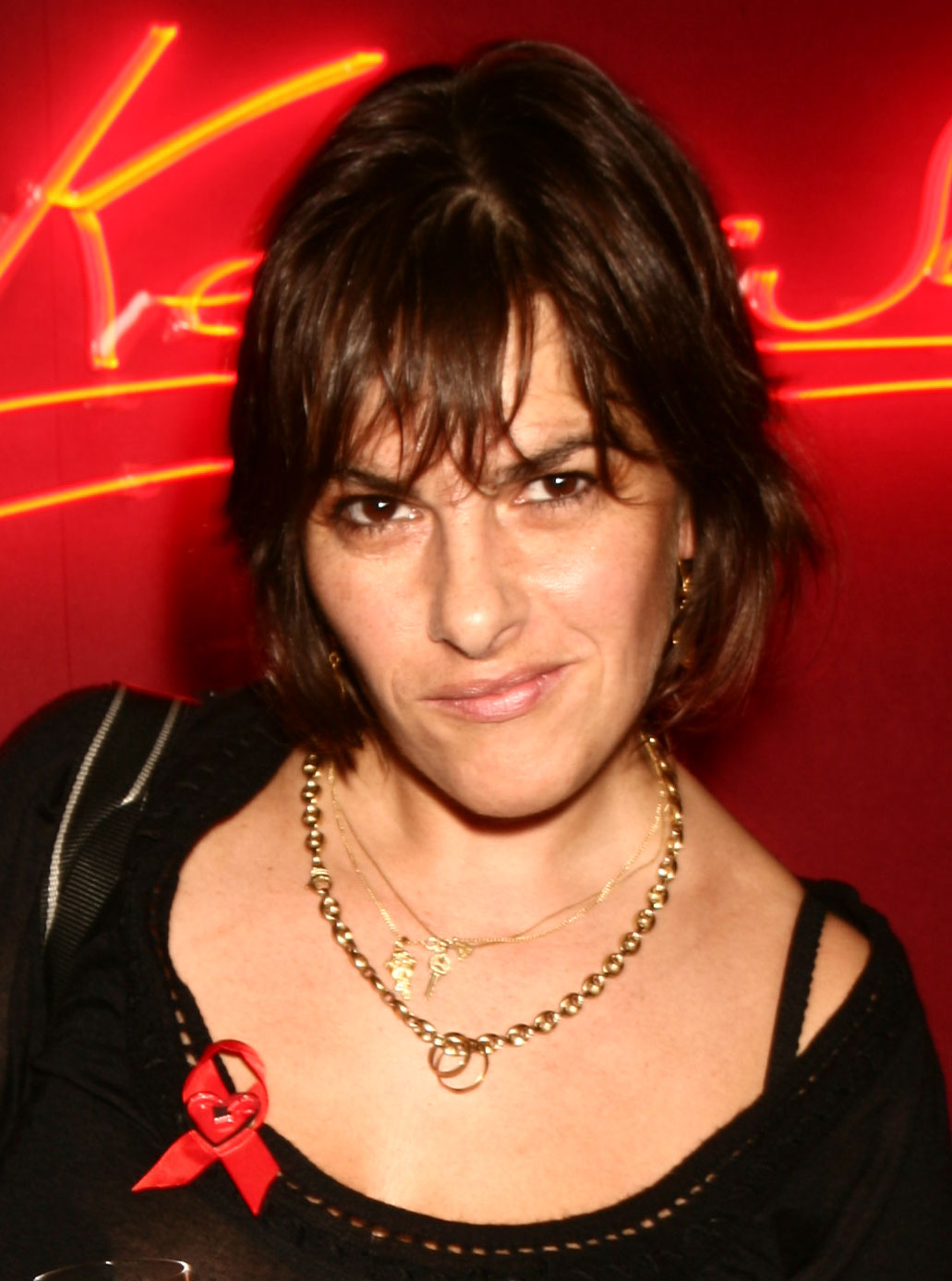
- Emin at Lighthouse Gala auction in aid of Terrence Higgins Trust, 2007
- Born: Tracey Karima Emin; 3 July 1963 (age 63); Croydon, England
- Education: Medway College of Design (1980–82); Maidstone College of Art (1983–86) (BA Printmaking); Royal College of Art (1987–89) (MA Painting); Birkbeck University of London
- Occupation: Artist
- Notable work: Everyone I Have Ever Slept With 1963–1995 (1995); My Bed (1998)
- Style: Readymade; Installation art
- Movement: Young British Artists
- Tracey Emin's voice from the BBC programme Front Row, 22 April 2013
- Website: traceyeminfoundation.com

Dame Tracey Karima Emin (/ˈɛmɪn/; born 3 July 1963) is an English artist known for autobiographical and confessional artwork. She produces work in a variety of media including drawing, painting, sculpture, film, photography, neon text and sewn appliqué. Once the "enfant terrible" of the Young British Artists in the 1980s, Emin was elected as a Royal Academician in 2016.

In 1997, Emin’s work Everyone I Have Ever Slept With 1963–1995, a tent appliquéd with the names of everyone the artist had ever slept with, was shown at Charles Saatchi's Sensation exhibition held at the Royal Academy in London. In the same year, she gained considerable media exposure when she appeared to be drunk, and swore repeatedly, on a live television broadcast of a British discussion programme called The Death of Painting.

In 1999, Emin had her first solo exhibition in the United States at Lehmann Maupin Gallery, entitled Every Part of Me's Bleeding. Later that year, she was nominated for the Turner Prize and exhibited My Bed – a readymade installation, consisting of her own unmade dirty bed, in which she had spent several weeks drinking, smoking, eating, sleeping and having sexual intercourse while undergoing a period of severe emotional flux. The artwork featured used condoms and blood-stained underwear.

Emin is also a panelist and speaker: she has lectured at the Victoria and Albert Museum in London, the Art Gallery of New South Wales in Sydney (2010), the Royal Academy of Arts (2008), and the Tate Britain in London (2005) about the links between creativity and autobiography and the role of subjectivity and personal histories in constructing art. In December 2011, she was appointed Professor of Drawing at the Royal Academy; with Fiona Rae, she is one of the first two female professors since the Academy was founded in 1768. Emin lived in Spitalfields, East London, before returning to Margate, where she funds the TKE Studios with workspace for aspiring artists.

== Biography ==
=== Early life and education ===
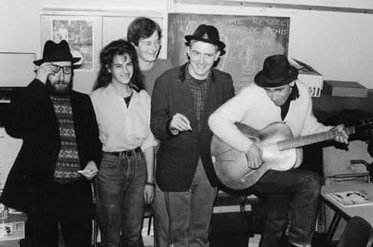
Sexton Ming, Tracey Emin, Charles Thomson, Billy Childish and Russell Wilkins at the Rochester Adult Education Centre 11 December 1987 to record The Medway Poets LP

Tracey Karima Emin was born on 3 July 1963 in Croydon, a district of south London, to an English mother of Romanichal descent and a Turkish Cypriot father. She was brought up in Margate, Kent, with her twin brother, Paul.

Emin shares a paternal great-grandfather with her second cousin Meral Hussein-Ece, Baroness Hussein-Ece.

Her work has been analysed within the context of early adolescent and childhood abuse, as well as sexual assault. Emin was raped at the age of 13 while living in Margate, citing assaults in the area as "what happened to a lot of girls." Emin later said in an article she wrote for the Evening Standard that she had "no memory of being a virgin", citing numerous times she was raped as a young teenager.

She studied fashion at Medway College of Design (now part of the University for the Creative Arts) (1980–82). There she met expelled student Billy Childish and was associated with The Medway Poets. Emin and Childish were a couple until 1987, during which time she was the administrator for his small press, Hangman Books, which published his confessional poetry. From 1983–86 she studied printmaking at Maidstone Art College (now part of the University for the Creative Arts) where she graduated with a first class degree in Printmaking. Also, whilst at Maidstone college of Art, Tracey Emin encountered Roberto Navickas aka Roberto Navikas, a name which was later to feature prominently in her "tent". Emin however, mistakenly misspelled his name by dropping a C. Navickas used this error to promote two artworks of his own, some twenty odd years later when re-entering the art world. The works were titled "The Lost C of Emin: The Discovery" & "The Lost C of Emin: A Reliquary" (see tent below).

In 1995, she was interviewed in the Minky Manky show catalogue by Carl Freedman, who asked her, "Which person do you think has had the greatest influence on your life?" To which she replied, "Uhmm... It's not a person really. It was more a time, going to Maidstone College of Art, hanging around with Billy Childish, living by the River Medway".

In 1987, Emin moved to London to study at the Royal College of Art, where in 1989 she obtained an MA in painting. After graduation, she had two traumatic abortions and those experiences led her to destroy all the art she had produced in graduate school and later described the period as "emotional suicide".

One of the paintings that survives from her time at Royal College of Art is Friendship, which is in that university’s Collection. A series of photographs from her early work that was not destroyed was displayed as part of My Major Retrospective, a solo exhibition held at the White Cube gallery in London, from 19 November, 1993 to 8 January, 1994.

Her influences include Edvard Munch and Egon Schiele, and for a time she studied philosophy at Birkbeck, University of London.

=== Career beginnings ===
On 3 January 1993, Emin opened a shop with fellow artist Sarah Lucas, called The Shop at 103 Bethnal Green Road in Bethnal Green, which sold works by the two of them, including T-shirts and ashtrays with Damien Hirst's picture stuck to the bottom (referencing the cigarette works he was doing at the time). The venue also contained a life-drawing room in the basement and studio space where Emin and Lucas worked. Emin and Lucas were able to fund The Shop with money Lucas had from Charles Saatchi. The Shop was open for six months and closed with Emin's 30th birthday - 'Fuckin’ Fantastic at 30 and Just About Old Enough to Do Whatever She Wants'. After it closed, Emin burned everything that was left from The Shop in, gallerist, Carl Freedman's garden and the ashes were exhibited at her exhibition My Major Retrospective at the White Cube in November 1993.

In November 1993, Emin had her first solo show at White Cube, a contemporary art gallery in London. It was called My Major Retrospective and was autobiographical, consisting of personal photographs, photos of her (destroyed) early paintings, as well as items which most artists would not consider showing in public (such as a packet of cigarettes her uncle was holding when he was decapitated in a car crash).

In the mid-1990s, Emin had a relationship with Carl Freedman, who had been an early friend of, and collaborator with, Damien Hirst, and who had co-curated seminal Britart shows, such as Modern Medicine and Gambler. In 1994, they toured the US together, driving in a Cadillac from San Francisco to New York, and making stops en route where she gave readings from her autobiographical book Exploration of the Soul to finance the trip.

The couple spent time by the sea in Whitstable together, using a beach hut that she uprooted and turned into art in 1999 with the title The Last Thing I Said to You is Don't Leave Me Here, which was destroyed in the 2004 Momart warehouse fire.

Everyone I Have Ever Slept With 1963–1995 by Tracey Emin (1995). An interior view of the work.

In 1995, Freedman curated the show Minky Manky at the South London Gallery. Emin has said,

At that time Sarah (Lucas) was quite famous, but I wasn't at all. Carl said to me that I should make some big work as he thought the small-scale stuff I was doing at the time wouldn't stand up well. I was furious. Making that work was my way at getting back at him.

The result was her "tent" Everyone I Have Ever Slept With 1963–1995, which was first exhibited in the show. It was a blue tent, appliquéd with the names of everyone she has slept with. These included sexual partners, plus relatives she slept with as a child, her twin brother and her two aborted children.

The needlework which is integral to this work was used by Emin in a number of her other pieces. This piece was later bought by Charles Saatchi and included in the successful 1997 Sensation exhibition at the Royal Academy; it then toured to Berlin and New York. It, too, was destroyed by the fire in Saatchi's east London warehouse, in 2004.

=== Public recognition ===
Emin was largely unknown by the public until she appeared on a Channel 4 television programme in 1997, "Is Painting Dead?". The show comprised a group discussion about that year's Turner Prize and was broadcast live. Emin was drunk, slurred and swore before walking out of the interview.

My Bed by Tracey Emin

Two years later, in 1999, Emin was shortlisted for the Turner Prize herself and exhibited My Bed at the Tate Gallery.

There was considerable media attention regarding the apparently trivial and possibly unhygienic elements of the installation, such as yellow stains on the bedsheets, condoms, empty cigarette packets and a pair of knickers with menstrual stains. The bed was presented as it had been when she had stayed in it for several days, feeling suicidal because of relationship difficulties.

Two performance artists, Yuan Chai and Jian Jun Xi, jumped onto the bed with bare torsos to "improve" the work, which they thought had not gone far enough.

In July 1999, at the height of Emin's Turner Prize fame, she created a number of monoprints drawings inspired by the public and private life of Diana, Princess of Wales for a themed exhibition called Temple of Diana held at The Blue Gallery, London. Works such as They Wanted You To Be Destroyed (1999) related to Diana's bulimia, while other monoprints included affectionate texts such as Love Was on Your Side and a description of Diana's dress with puffy sleeves. Other drawings highlighted The things you did to help other people written next to a drawing by Emin of Diana, Princess of Wales in protective clothing walking through a minefield in Angola. Another work was a delicate sketch of a rose drawn next to the phrase "It makes perfect sence (sic) to know they killed you" referring to the conspiracy theories surrounding Diana's death. Emin herself described the drawings, saying they "could be considered quite scrappy, fresh, kind of naïve looking drawings" and "It's pretty difficult for me to do drawings not about me and about someone else. But I did have a lot of ideas. They're quite sentimental I think and there's nothing cynical about it whatsoever."

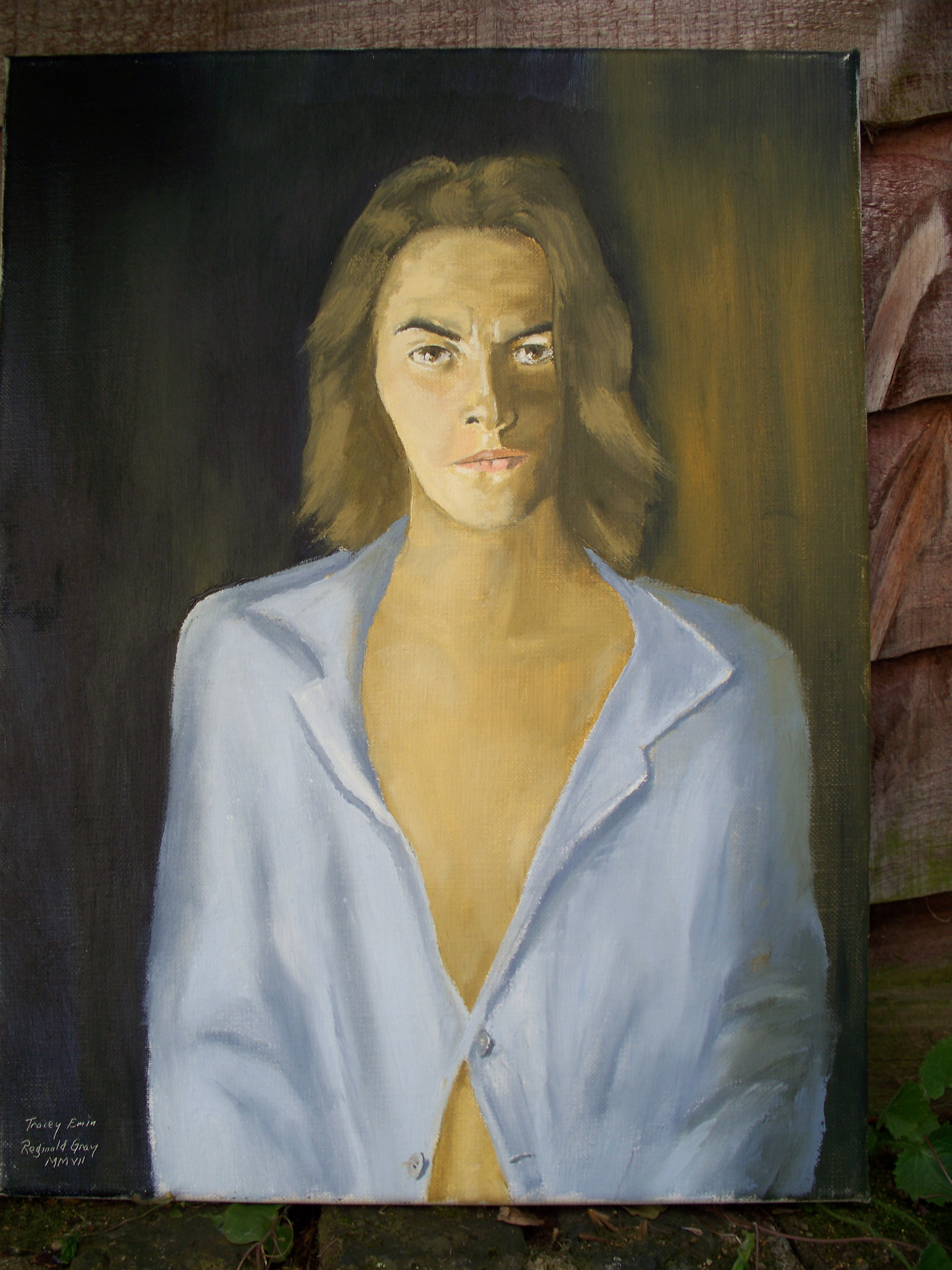
Portrait by Reginald Gray

Elton John collects Emin's work, as did George Michael. Michael and his partner Kenny Goss held the A Tribute To Tracey Emin exhibition in September 2007 at their Dallas-based museum, the Goss-Michael Foundation (formerly Goss Gallery).

This was the inaugural exhibition for the gallery which displayed a variety of Emin works from a large blanket, video installations, prints, paintings and a number of neon works including a special neon piece George Loves Kenny (2007) which was the centrepiece of the exhibition, developed by Emin after she wrote an article for The Independent newspaper in February 2007 with the same title. Goss and Michael (died 25 December 2016), acquired 25 works by Emin.

Other celebrities and musicians who support Emin's art include models Jerry Hall and Naomi Campbell, film star Orlando Bloom, who bought a number of Emin's works at charity auctions. Pop band Temposhark, whose lead singer collects Emin's art, named their debut album The Invisible Line, inspired by passages from Emin's book Exploration of The Soul. Rock legend Ronnie Wood of the Rolling Stones is a well documented friend of Emin, whose own paintings are inspired by Emin's work.

Emin was invited to Madonna's country estate Ashcombe. The singer described Emin, saying: "Tracey is intelligent and wounded and not afraid to expose herself," and, "She is provocative but she has something to say. I can relate to that." David Bowie, a childhood inspiration of Emin's, also became friends with the artist. Bowie once described Emin as "William Blake as a woman, written by Mike Leigh".

Like the George Michael and Kenny Goss neon, Emin created a unique neon work for her supermodel friend Kate Moss called Moss Kin. In 2004, it was reported that this unique piece had been discovered dumped in a skip in east London. The piece, consisting of neon tubing spelling the words Moss Kin, had been mistakenly thrown out of a basement, owned by the craftsman who made the glass. The artwork was never collected by Moss and had therefore been stored for three years in the basement of a specialist artist used by Emin in the Spitalfields area. It was accidentally dumped when the craftsman moved. The term used in the work Kin is a recurring theme of Emin's to describe those dear to her, her loved ones. Other examples can be seen in a monoprint called MatKin dedicated to her then boyfriend artist Mat Collishaw and released as an aquatint limited edition in 1997. Emin created a nude drawing of Kate Moss known as Kate (2000), signed and dated 1 February 2000 in pencil. In 2006, the same image was released as a limited edition etching, but renamed as Kate Moss 2000 (2006). Emin's work was included in the 2022 exhibition Women Painting Women at the Modern Art Museum of Fort Worth.

=== Stuckism ===
Emin's relationship with the artist and musician Billy Childish led to the name of the Stuckism movement in 1999. Childish, who had mocked her new affiliation to conceptualism in the early 1990s, was told by Emin, "Your paintings are stuck, you are stuck! – Stuck! Stuck! Stuck!" (that is, stuck in the past for not accepting the YBA approach to art). He recorded the incident in the poem, "Poem for a Pissed Off Wife" published in Big Hart and Balls Hangman Books 1994, from which Charles Thomson, who knew them both, later coined the term Stuckism.

Emin and Childish had remained on friendly terms up until 1999, but the activities of the Stuckist group offended her and caused a lasting rift with Childish. In a 2003 interview, when she was asked about the Stuckists, she said:

I don't like it at all… I don't really want to talk about it. If your wife was stalked and hounded through the media by someone she'd had a relationship with when she was 18, would you like it? That's what happened to me. I don't find it funny, I find it a bit sick, and I find it very cruel, and I just wish people would get on with their own lives and let me get on with mine.

Childish left the Stuckist movement in 2001.

=== Modern Art Oxford (2002–03) ===
From November 2002 to January 2003, Tracey Emin's solo exhibition This Is Another Place was held at Modern Art Oxford and marked the museum's reopening and renaming to Modern Art Oxford. The exhibition was Emin's first British exhibition since 1997. The exhibition contained drawings, etchings, film, neon works such as Fuck off and die, you slag, and sculptures including a large-scale wooden pier, called Knowing My Enemy, with a wooden shack on its top made from reclaimed timber.

Emin commented that she decided to exhibit in Oxford as museum director Andrew Nairne had always been "a big supporter of my work". An exhibition catalogue included 50 illustrations: "a compilation of images and writings reflecting her life, her sexual experiences and her desires and fears."

=== Momart fire (2004) ===
On 24 May 2004, a fire in a Momart storage warehouse in East London destroyed many works from the Saatchi collection, including Emin's famous tent with appliquéd letters, Everyone I Have Ever Slept With 1963–1995 ("The Tent") (1995) and The Last Thing I Said To You Is Don't Leave Me Here ("The Hut") (1999), Emin's blue wooden beach hut that she bought with fellow artist Sarah Lucas and shared with her boyfriend of the time, the gallerist Carl Freedman. Emin spoke out angrily against what she perceived as a general public lack of sympathy, and even amusement, at the loss of the artworks in the fire. She commented, "I'm also upset about those people whose wedding got bombed last week [in Iraq], and people being dug out from under 400ft of mud in the Dominican Republic."

=== Venice Biennale (2007) ===
In August 2006, the British Council announced that they had chosen Emin to produce a show of new and past works for the British Pavilion at the 52nd Venice Biennale in 2007. Emin was the second woman to produce a solo show for the UK at the Biennale, following Rachel Whiteread in 1997. Andrea Rose, the commissioner for the British Pavilion, stated that the exhibition would allow Emin's work to be viewed "in an international context and at a distance from the YBA generation with which she came to prominence".

Emin picked the title Borrowed Light for the exhibition. She produced new work especially for the British Pavilion, using a wide variety of media, from needlework, photography and video to drawing, painting, sculpture and neon. A promotional British Council flyer included an image of a previously unseen monoprint for the exhibition called Fat Minge (1994) that was included in the show, while the Telegraph newspaper featured a photo of a new purple neon Legs I (2007) that was on display (directly inspired by Emin's 2004 purple watercolour Purple Virgin series). Emin summed up her Biennale exhibition work as "Pretty and hard-core".

Emin was interviewed about the Venice Biennale by the BBC's Kirsty Wark in November 2006. Emin showed Wark some work-in-progress, which included large-scale canvases with paintings of Emin's legs and vagina. Starting with the Purple Virgin (2004) acrylic watercolour series with their strong purple brush strokes depicting Emin's naked open legs, leading to Emin's paintings in 2005-2006 such as Asleep Alone With Legs Open (2005), the Reincarnation (2005) series and Masturbating (2006) amongst others. These works were a significant new development in her artistic output.

Andrea Rose, the British Pavilion commissioner, added to this, commenting on the art Emin has produced, saying: "It's remarkably ladylike. There is no ladette work – no toilet with a poo in it – and actually it is very mature I think, quite lovely. She is much more interested in formal values than people might expect, and it shows in this exhibition. It's been revelatory working with her. Tracey's reputation for doing shows and hanging them is not good, but she's been a dream to work with. What it shows is that she's moved a long way away from the YBAs. She's quite a lady actually!"

=== Royal Academician (2007) ===
On 29 March 2007, Tracey Emin was made a Royal Academician by the Royal Academy of Arts. In becoming a member of the Royal Academy Emin joined an elite group of artists that includes David Hockney, Peter Blake, Anthony Caro and Alison Wilding. Her Academician status entitles Emin to exhibit up to six works in the annual summer exhibition.

Emin had previously been invited to include works at the Royal Academy Summer Exhibitions in 2001, then again from 2004-2007. For 2004's Summer Exhibition, Emin was chosen by fellow artist David Hockney to submit two monoprints, one called And I'd Love To Be The One (1997), and another on the topic of Emin's abortion called Ripped Up (1995), as that year's theme celebrated the art of drawing as part of the creative process. 2007 saw Emin exhibit a neon work called Angel (2005). Her art was first exhibited at the Royal Academy as part of the Sensation exhibition in 1997.

For the June 2008 Summer Exhibition, Emin was invited to curate a gallery. Emin also gave a public talk in June 2008. Interviewed by art critic and broadcaster Matthew Collings, discussion focused on her role within the Royal Academy and the Academy's relationship to the contemporary art world, and her perspective, as an artist, on hanging and curating a gallery in the Summer Exhibition. She exhibited her famous Space Monkey – We Have Lift Off print at the 2009 Royal Academy Summer Exhibition.

=== Twenty Years retrospective (2008) ===
The first major retrospective of Emin's work was held in Edinburgh between August and November 2008 attracting over 40,000 visitors, breaking the Scottish National Gallery of Modern Art's record for an exhibition of work by a living artist.

The large-scale exhibition included the full range of Emin's art from the rarely seen early work to the iconic My Bed (1998) and the room-sized installation Exorcism of the Last Painting I Ever Made (1996). The show displayed her unique appliquéd blankets, paintings, sculptures, films, neons, drawings and monoprints. The Scottish National Gallery of Modern Art was the only UK venue for the show which then went to the Centro de Arte Contemporáneo in Málaga, Spain, and then to the Kunstmuseum in Bern, Switzerland from 2009.

It was reported on 6 November 2008 that Emin gifted a major sculpture to the Scottish National Gallery of Modern Art as a "thank you" to both the gallery and the city of Edinburgh. The work Roman Standard (2005) comprises a 13-foot-tall (4.0 m) bronze pole, surmounted by a little bird, cast in bronze. The work has an estimated value of at least £75,000.

=== Love Is What You Want retrospective (2011) ===
In May–August 2011, a major survey exhibition at London's Hayward Gallery consisted of work from all aspects of Emin's art practice, revealing facets of the artist and her work that are frequently overlooked. The exhibition included painting, drawing, photography, textiles, video and sculpture, with rarely before seen early works alongside more recent large-scale installations. Emin made a new series of outdoor sculptures especially for this solo show.

=== The Vanishing Lake – Frieze Fair (2011) ===
On 6 October 2011, Emin opened a site-specific exhibition at a Georgian house on Fitzroy Square. The title is taken from her novel which has served as a catalyst for a series of works, created for a neoclassical house designed by Robert Adam in 1794. The exhibition also featured a series of embroidered texts and hand-woven tapestries which continued Emin's interest in domestic and handcrafted traditions. Emin herself has said, "I called it that because I saw part of myself as drying and not there anymore and I wanted to question the whole idea of love and passion, whether love exists anymore...Why? Because I'm nearly 50, I'm single, because I don't have children."

=== London 2012 Olympic and Paralympic Games ===
Emin was a mentor on the British Airways Great Britons Programme. She also produced a poster and limited edition print for the London 2012 Olympic and Paralympic Games, one of only 12 British artists selected. On 19 July 2012, Emin carried the Olympic torch through her hometown of Margate.

=== Joint exhibit with Edvard Munch ===
In December 2020, Emin had a gallery exhibition containing works by Edvard Munch, entitled The Loneliness of the Soul, at the Royal Academy of Arts. Emin selected 19 pieces of Munch's work to be displayed alongside 25 pieces of her own. Simultaneously, she had a show at London's White Cube gallery which included a short Super-8 film in tribute to Munch.

The exhibition was re-shown at the newly opened Munch Museum in Oslo, with Emin being the first artist to show alongside the Norwegian painter. Works included recent paintings, as well as her seminal work My Bed. Emin had suffered from cancer the year before the exhibit and was unsure whether she would be able to see it herself. The exhibition travelled to the Royal Academy of Arts in London in 2021. Reviewing the exhibition for Londonist, Tabish Khan said: "It captures that sense of loneliness I've struggled to put into words, and left me emotionally spent". It was also reviewed favourably in The Guardian with Tim Adams writing "This exhibition is not comprehensive enough to be billed as a retrospective, but even so, everything that Emin has made and felt and suffered in the past is brought to full expression in it".

=== By The Time You See Me There Will Be Nothing Left (2024) ===
An exhibition of Emin's work produced post-cancer diagnosis ran from 24 May 2024 until 27 July. The show included You Keep Fucking Me and was held in the Xavier Hufkens gallery in Brussels. She told The Guardian: "It's the best show I have ever done."

=== Tracey Emin: A Second Life (2026) ===
From 27 February to 31 August 2026, the Tate Modern will be exhibiting Tracey Emin: A Second Life, that traces her career over forty years through various media and displaying previously undisplayed works.

== Artistic work ==
=== Monoprints ===
Emin's monoprints are a well-documented part of her creative output. These unique drawings have a diaristic aspect and frequently depict events from the past, for example, Poor Love (1999), From The Week of Hell '94 (1995) and Ripped Up (1995), which relate to traumatic experiences; or other personal events as seen in Fuck You Eddy (1995) and Sad Shower in New York (1995), both of which are part of the Tate's collection of Emin's art.

The monoprints often incorporate text as well as image, though some bear only text, others only image. The text appears as the artist's stream of consciousness. Some critics have compared Emin's text-only monoprints to ransom notes. Emin frequently misspells words, deliberately or due to the speed at which she does each drawing. In a 2002 interview with Lynn Barber, Emin said: "It's not cute affectation. If I could spell, then I would spell correctly, but I never bothered to learn. So, rather than be inhibited and say I can't write because I can't spell, I just write and get on with it."

Emin created a key series of monoprints in 1997 with the text Something's Wrong or There Must Be Something Terebley Wrong With Me [sic] written with spelling mistakes intact in large capital letters alongside "forlorn figures surrounded by space, their outlines fragile on the page. Some are complete bodies, others only female torsos, legs splayed and with odd, spidery flows gushing from their vaginas. They are all accompanied by the legend There's Something Wrong."

Other key monoprints include a series from 1994 and 1995 known as the Illustrations from Memory series which document Emin's childhood memories of sexual awakening and other experiences growing up in Margate, such as Fucking Down An Ally 16/5/95 (1995) and Illustrations from Memory, the year 1974. In The Livingroom (1994). Emin further produced a set of monoprints detailing her memories of Margate's iconic buildings such as Margate Harbour 16/5/95 (1995), The Lido 16/5/95 (1995) and Light House 15/5/95 (1995). Other drawings from 1994 include the Family Suite series, part of the Scottish National Gallery of Modern Art collection, consisting of 20 monoprints with "archetypal themes in Emin's art: sex, her family, her abortions, and Margate". This series of monoprints was displayed for the first time from August 2008 at the Edinburgh gallery as part of her first major retrospective, which has been called the Summer Blockbuster exhibition. A further Family Suite II set was exhibited in Los Angeles in November 2007 as part of Emin's solo show at the Gagosian gallery.

Emin's monoprints are rarely displayed alone in exhibitions. Emin has made several works documenting moments of sadness and loneliness experienced when traveling to foreign cities for various exhibitions, such as Thinking of You(2005) and Bath White I (2005) which were from a series of monoprints drawn directly onto USA Mondrian hotel stationery. Emin has said, "Being an artist isn't just about making nice things, or people patting you on the back; it's some kind of communication, a message."

In 2009, along with book publisher Rizzoli, Emin released a book titled One Thousand Drawings. As the title suggests, the book contains 1,000 drawings from Emin's career since 1988. The book's release coincided with Emin's show Those who suffer love at White Cube. Emin said in an interview that "We actually looked at about 2,000 drawings and then chose 1,000 drawings... I'd probably done, over that period of time about 4,000 drawings".

Monoprint drawings of mothers and children that Emin drew during a pregnancy in 1990 were included in a 2010 joint exhibition with Paula Rego and Mat Collishaw at the Foundling Museum.

Rarely exhibited examples of monoprints gifted to friends and family of Emin form a niche but revealing body of work. Emin has gifted monoprints to individuals including her brother Paul Emin and the singer Cat Stevens (Yusuf Islam) with whom she shares Cypriot heritage.

=== Painting ===
Emin displayed six small watercolours in her Turner Prize exhibition in 1999 and also in her New York show Every Part of Me's Bleeding held that same year, known as the Berlin Watercolour series (1998). These delicate, washed out but colourful watercolours include four portraits of Emin's face. They were all painted by Emin in Berlin during 1998, adapted from Polaroids of the artist taking a bath. Each unique painting from this series share the same title, Berlin The Last Week in April 1998. Simon Wilson, spokesperson for the Tate, commented that Emin included the set of tiny Berlin watercolours "as a riposte to the accusation that there are no paintings" in the Turner Prize exhibitions. The bath theme seen in these watercolours was later revisited in her photographic work Sometimes I Feel Beautiful (2000) and in monoprints such as the Bath White (2005) series. With all these works, Emin explores a Mary Cassatt quality of the "woman in a private moment".

In May 2005, London's Evening Standard newspaper highlighted Emin's return to painting in their preview of her When I Think About Sex exhibition at White Cube. Emin was quoted as saying, "For this show I wanted to show that I can really draw, and I think they are really sexy drawings."

Work for her 2007 show at the Venice Biennale included large-scale canvases of her legs and vagina. A watercolour series called The Purple Virgins were displayed. There are ten Purple Virgin works in total, six of which were shown at the Biennale. These were accompanied by two canvases of a similar style called How I Think I Feel 1 and 2. The Venice Biennale was also the first time Emin's Abortion Watercolour series, painted in 1990, had ever been shown in public.

Jay Jopling presented a new Emin painting, Rose Virgin (2007), as part of White Cube's stand at the Frieze Art Fair in London's Regent's Park on 10 October 2007, with more new paintings shown in Emin's You Left Me Breathing exhibition in Los Angeles' Gagosian gallery from 2 November 2007, described in an interview as an 'exhibition of sculpture and painting'. A number of new paintings were on display including Get Ready for the Fuck of Your Life (2007).

An article by art critic Alastair Sooke published in The Daily Telegraph in 2014 discussed Emin's change of direction from conceptual pieces to painting and sculpture. Sooke claimed that although Emin was appointed Professor of Drawing at the Royal Academy in 2011, she had been taking drawing lessons privately for some years in New York and that she had also been taking sculpture lessons for at least three years. Neither Emin or Jay Jopling have commented on the article.

=== Photography ===
Emin has produced many photographic works throughout her career, including Monument Valley (Grand Scale) (1995–97) and Outside Myself (Monument Valley, reading "Exploration of the Soul") (1995) which resulted "from a trip Emin made to the United States in 1994. She and her then boyfriend, writer, curator and gallery owner Carl Freedman, drove from San Francisco to New York, stopping off along the way to give readings from her 1994 book, Exploration of the Soul. The photograph shows the artist sitting in an upholstered chair in Monument Valley, a spectacular location on the southern border of Utah with northern Arizona, holding her book. Although it is open, it is not clear whether she is looking at the viewer or at the text in front of her. Emin gave her readings sitting in the chair, which she had inherited from her grandmother, which also became part of Emin's art, There's A Lot of Money in Chairs (1994)."

Other photographic works include a series of nine images comprising the work Naked Photos – Life Model Goes Mad (1996) documenting a painting performance Emin made in a room specially built in Galleri Andreas Brändström in Stockholm, Sweden. Another photographic series, Trying on Clothes From My Friends (She Took The Shirt Off His Back) (1997), shows the artist trying on her friends' clothes.

Other works such as I've Got It All (2000) show Emin with her "legs splayed on a red floor, clutching banknotes and coins to her crotch. Made at a time of public and financial success, the image connects the artist's desire for money and success and her sexual desire (her role as consumer) with her use of her body and her emotional life to produce her art (the object of consumption)", while Sometimes I Feel Beautiful (2000) pictures Emin lying alone in a bath. Both these works are examples of her using "large-scale photographs of herself to record and express moments of emotional significance in her life, frequently making reference to her career as an artist. The photographs have a staged quality, as though the artist is enacting a private ritual."

Emin's two self-portraits taken inside her beach hut, The Last Thing I Said To You Is Don't Leave Me Here I (2000) and The Last Thing I Said To You Is Don't Leave Me Here II (2000) are a diptych, although they are often exhibited and sold separately. They depict a naked Emin on her knees inside her beach hut which she and friend Sarah Lucas had bought in Whitstable, Kent in 1992.

The hut itself later became the sculpture The Last Thing I Said To You Is Don't Leave Me Here (The Hut) (1999). They are part of museum collections including Tate Modern, the Saatchi Gallery and the National Portrait Gallery and have been mass produced as postcards sold in museum shops around the world.

=== Neon ===
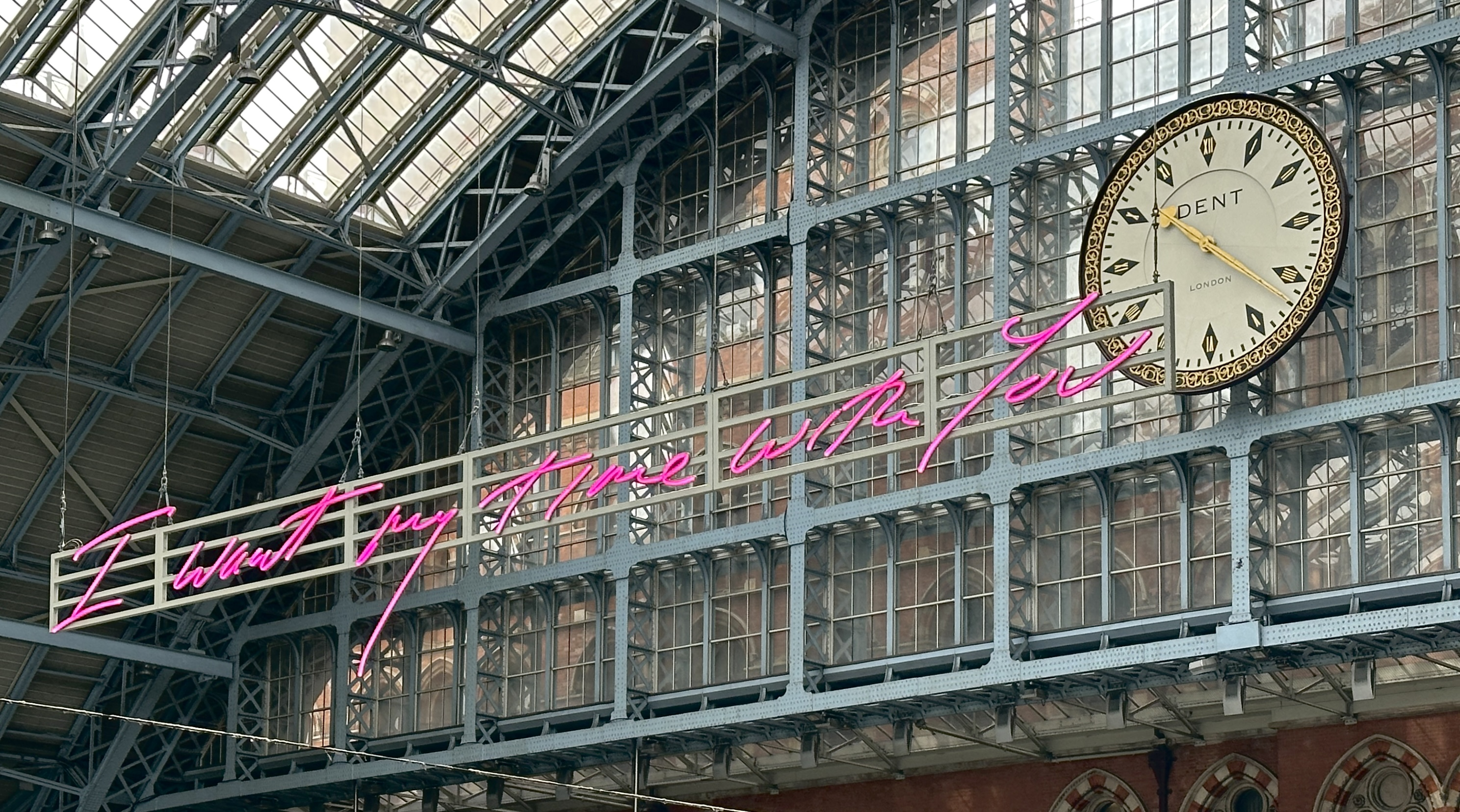
Emin's I Want My Time With You neon sign and the Dent Clock at St Pancras railway station in London

Emin has also worked with neon lights. One such piece is You Forgot To Kiss My Soul (2001) which consists of those words in blue neon inside a neon heart-shape. Another neon piece is made from the words Is Anal Sex Legal (1998). to complement another Is Legal Sex Anal (1998)

For the Venice Biennale, she produced a series of new purple neon works, for example, Legs I (2007). This 2007 series of Legs neon works were directly inspired by the Purple Virgin (2004) watercolour series. For example, Legs IV (2007) directly follows the watercolour lines of the Purple Virgin 9 (2004). For a joint 2010 exhibition with Paula Rego and Mat Collishaw, she decorated the front of the Foundling Museum with the neon words "Foundlings and fledglings are angels of this earth".

Emin has donated neon work to auction for charity. In 2007, her neon Keep Me Safe piece reached the highest price ever made for one of her neon works, selling for over £60,000. A brand new neon piece called With You I Want To Live was shown as part of Emin's You Left Me Breathing exhibition in 2007 at the Gagosian Gallery in Los Angeles.

In 2018, Emin's largest neon work was displayed at London St Pancras Station, the work called I Want My Time With You hangs below the large central clock in the station. In an interview with The Guardian, Emin stated that the work was a message to the rest of Europe during the Brexit Crisis. Passengers disembarking Eurostar trains from Paris, Brussels and Amsterdam arrive at the station every day underneath the work.

=== Fabric ===
Emin frequently works with fabric in the form of appliqués (material (often cut out into lettering, sewn onto other material). She collects fabric from curtains, bed sheets and linen and has done so for most of her life. She keeps material that holds emotional significance for later use in her work. Many of her large-scale appliqués are made on hotel linens, for example, It Always Hurts (2005), Sometimes I Feel So Fucking Lost (2005), Volcano Closed (2001) and Helter Fucking Skelter (2001). Hate And Power Can Be A Terrible Thing (2004), part of the Tate's collection of Emin's work, is a large-scale blanket inspired in part by Margaret Thatcher due to her involvement in "an attack on 800 boys and men in the Argentinian navy" and other women. Women who steal their friends' boyfriends, for example (Emin says of this work "about the kind of women I hate, the kind of women I have no respect for, women who betray and destroy the hearts of other women").

Emin's use of fabric is diverse. One of her most famous works came from sewing letters onto her grandmother's armchair in There's A Lot of Money in Chairs (1994). The chair was very detailed, "including her and her twin brother's names, the year of her grandmother's birth (1901) and the year of her death (1963) on either side of the words 'another world,' referring to the passing of time. An exchange between the artist and her grandmother using the nicknames they had for each other: 'Ok Puddin, Thanks Plum', covers the bottom front of the chair and a saying of Emin's grandmother's, "There's a lot of money in chairs", is appliquéd in pink along the top and front of its back. Behind the chair back, the first page of Exploration of the Soul, handwritten onto fabric, is appliquéd together with other dictums such as, "It's not what you inherit. It's what you do with your inheritance".

Emin used the chair on a trip she made to the United States in 1994, driving from San Francisco to New York stopping off along the way to give readings from her book, Exploration of the Soul (1994). Emin gave her readings sitting in the upholstered chair and "as she crossed the United States, the artist sewed the names of the places she visited – San Francisco, Los Angeles, San Diego, Las Vegas, Monument Valley, Detroit, Pittsburgh, New York – onto the front of the chair". Emin also posed in the chair for two of her photographic works (see Photography) while in Monument Valley, in the Arizona Desert. It was on public display at Pallant House Gallery until 6 March 2011 as part of the exhibition, 'Contemporary Eye: Crossovers.'

Emin has made a large number of smaller-scale works, often including hand sewn words and images, such as Falling Stars (2001), It Could Have Been Something (2001), Always Sorry (2005) and As Always (2005).

On 13 April 2007, Emin launched a specially designed flag made out of fabric with the message One Secret Is To Save Everything written in orange-red letters across the banner made up of hand-sewn swimming sperm. Emin's flag, sized 21 feet by 14 feet, flew above the Jubilee Gardens in the British capital until 31 July 2007, with the parliament building and the London Eye as backdrops. Emin called the artwork "a flag made from wishful thinking". The flag was commissioned by the South Bank Centre in London's Waterloo.

In June 2007, on returning from the Venice Biennale, Emin donated a piece of artwork, a handsewn blanket called Star Trek Voyager to be auctioned at Elton John's annual glamorous White Tie & Tiara Ball to raise money for The Elton John AIDS Foundation. The piece of artwork sold for £800,000.

Emin's works on fabric has been related to other artists such as Louise Bourgeois, who Emin has also mentioned in a sewn work titled The Older Woman (2005) with a monoprint on fabric phrase, "I think my Dad should have gone out with someone older like Louise, Louise Bourgeois" applied. She was interviewed by Alan Yentob during the BBC's 2007 Imagine documentary Spiderwoman about Louise Bourgeois.

=== Sculpture ===
In February 2005, Emin's first public artwork, The Roman Standard, went on display outside the Oratory, adjacent to Liverpool Cathedral. It consists of a small bird perched on a tall bronze pole and is designed so that the bird seems to disappear when viewed from the front. It was commissioned by the BBC. Emin says the sculpture represents strength and femininity.

In September 2008, she unveiled a neon work that was installed in the well of the cathedral in Liverpool Cathedral. Emin herself says of her continuing relationship of making public sculptures in the town, "When Liverpool is Capital of Culture in 2008, I'll be making a large work for the Anglican Cathedral, which I'm really looking forward to."

Other sculptures include Death Mask (2002) which is a bronze cast of her own head. Emin loaned this work to the National Portrait Gallery in 2005.

At Emin's 2007 Venice Biennale exhibition, and the central exhibition's Tower sculptures, tall wooden towers consisting of small pieces of timber piled together and a new small bronze-cast sculpture work of a child's pink sock was revealed Sock(2007) on display on the steps of the British Pavilion. Her exhibition again attracted widespread UK media coverage, both positive and negative.

In September 2007, Emin announced she would be exhibiting new sculpture work in the inaugural Folkestone Triennial, which took place in the Kent town from June to September 2008. At the start of the exhibition's run, Emin discussed the Folkestone sculptures, stating the "high percentage" of teenage pregnancies in the Kent town had inspired this latest work. Emin said, "I'm going to be making very tiny bronze-cast items of baby clothing. It's baby clothes that I have found in the street, like a mitten or a sock." She placed several of the pieces made around the town.

Emin's 2007 solo show at Gagosian Gallery in Los Angeles' Beverly Hills included brand new sculpture works described by Emin as, "some very strange little sculptures. They are nearly all of animals, apart from one, which is a pineapple. They rest on mini-plinths made in a really brilliant LA, beach, California, Fifties surfer kind of style. Different woods put together in cute pattern formations. In some places the wood is 18th-century floorboards, some bits of cabin from tall ships or things which could have been found on the seashore – driftwood." The New York Times included Emin in a piece about artists who are "Originals", with a new photograph with two sculptures, one of a small bird on a thin stand and a large seagull, both sculptures placed on wooden plinths. Gagosian further described the many different sculptures from the show as, "a group of delicate wood and jesmonite sculptures, which expand on the spirals, rollercoasters, and bridges of recent years. Others incorporate cast bronze figures – seagulls, songbirds, and frogs – or objects combining cement and glass, which are placed on tables or bundled bases made from found timbers."

In late November 2007, it was announced that Emin was one of six artists to have been shortlisted to propose a sculpture for the fourth plinth in London's Trafalgar Square. The other shortlisted artists were Jeremy Deller, Antony Gormley, Anish Kapoor, Yinka Shonibare, and Bob and Roberta Smith.

In 2008, a small bronze sculpture, of a mitten, in the Baby Things series, was made by Emin. In 2010, the Foundling Museum acquired a painted bronze sculpture, attached to a wrought iron fence, referencing a "lost mitten".

The contenders were commissioned to produce a scale model of their idea. On 6 January 2008, it was revealed Emin's proposal was a lifesize model of a group of four meerkats, the desert mammal entitled Something for the Future. The meerkats were labelled "as a symbol of unity and safety..." as "whenever Britain is in crisis or, as a nation, is experiencing sadness and loss (for example, after Diana, Princess of Wales's funeral), the next programme on television is 'Meerkats United.'" The successful proposal were announced in 2008 as Gormley, whose project One & Other occupied the plinth in summer 2009 and Shonibare, whose work Nelson's Ship in a Bottle was unveiled in 2010.

A project commissioned by Oslo Municipality Art Programme, is a 7-metre-tall bronze sculpture, The Mother. It was unveiled on Museum Island, outside the new Munch Museum in 2020. (http://www.themuseumisland.com/). From the jury's assessment: 'With its immediate and visceral artistic approach it appears both intimate and majestic, vulnerable and grandiose. The title The Mother refers to a mature protector and the sculpture brings to mind the ubiquitous motifs of women and the nude in Munch's work. As a non‐idealised depiction of a woman made by a woman it can also be seen as a feminist statement.'

=== Film ===
- Quiet Lives (1982), featuring Emin and boyfriend Billy Childish—once available with Cheated and Room for Rent in A Hangman Triple Bill (also known as The Hangman Trilogy).
- Why I Never Became a Dancer (1995) is a single-screen projection with sound, shot on Super 8. Duration: 6 minutes, 40 seconds. It was made in an edition of 10 and an edited transcript has been published by Tate. The film portrays the artist's early adolescence in Margate, where she grew up. The film begins with the title written across a wall and then features a montage of views which are significant to Emin's past, including her school, the seaside and shops. The artist's voice narrates her story, opening with, "I never liked school / I was always late / In fact I hated it / So at thirteen I left." The video's final scenes show Emin's involvement in a local disco-dancing competition, in an attempt to escape to London to take part in the British Disco Dance Championship 1978. The last two minutes of the film consist of Emin dancing exuberantly around an empty studio with the song You Make Me Feel, by Sylvester along with a voice overed narration of her saying 'Shane, Eddy, Tony, Doug, Richard this one's for you'.

In the film, Emin describes leaving school at age 13 and spending her time on Margate's Golden Mile, dreaming and having sex. Sex "was something you could just do and it was for free". She was "13, 14" and having sex with men of "19, 20, 25, 26". In the film, the narration states: "It could be good, really something. I remember the first time someone asked me to grab their balls, I remember the power it gave me. But it wasn't always like that; sometimes they'd just cum, and then they'd leave me there, wherever I was, half naked." In the final scenes, the artist performs at a local dance competition and people begin to clap. A gang of men, "most of whom [the artist] had sex with at one time or another" began to chant "slag, slag, slag".

In an interview with Melvyn Bragg, Emin commented on the incident: "I don't see why I was such a slag. All I did was sleep with a few people. It's not a crime, I didn't kill anyone."

- How It Feels (1996)
- Tracey Emin's CV Cunt Vernacular (1997), an autobiographical work in which Emin narrates her story from childhood in Margate, through her student years, abortions and destruction of her early work.
- Homage to Edvard Munch and all My Dead Children (1998)
- Sometimes the Dress Is Worth More Money Than the Money (2001). ICA.
- Top Spot (2004), a feature-length non-fiction production mixing DV footage and Super 8 film into a montage. The title, Top Spot, refers to a youth centre/disco in Margate, as well as being an explicit sexual reference.

Emin has described Top Spot as being "about the moment of... understanding that you are walking into an adult world which means sex, which means often violence, which means that you may suddenly have some perspective on your own life that you never had before." Top Spot was given an 18 certificate by the British Board of Film Classification, much to Emin's dismay, as she intended the film for a teenage audience.

Emin withdrew the film from general distribution in cinemas after it was rated with an 18 certificate. It was broadcast on BBC3 television in the UK in December 2004, and a DVD of the film was released in 2004.

=== Installations ===
Emin has created a number of installation art pieces including Poor Thing (Sarah and Tracey) (2001) which was made up of two hanging frames, hospital gowns, a water bottle and wire. A similar installation called Feeling Pregnant III (2005) made up of fabric hung off wooden and metal coat hangers and stands was a later creation for Emin. Both of these installations touch further on Emin's relationship with pregnancy and abortion and can be related to Louise Bourgeois' sculptures such as Untitled (1996), a mobile of hanging clothes, and Untitled (2007), a series of standing bronze sculptures.

The Perfect Place to Grow (2001) was a video installation with a set consisting of a wooden birdhouse, a DVD (shot on Super 8), monitor, trestle, plants and wooden ladder. This installation was exhibited at the Tate Britain in 2004, in their room dedicated to Emin's work, and was previously exhibited at White Cube in 2001. It was dedicated to her father, creating the bird house as "a tiny home for my dad", and Emin thought of the works' title from the idea of "nature and nurture".

Knowing My Enemy (2002) was a large-scale installation created by Emin for her Modern Art Oxford solo show of that year. Consisting of reclaimed wood and steel, Emin created a wooden "look-out" house upon a long, broken, wooden pier. It's Not the Way I Want to Die (2005) was another large-scale installation, part of Emin's 2005 solo show at White Cube. Emin created a large rollercoaster track with reclaimed timber and metal. Displayed in the same show was a smaller installation work called Self Portrait (2005) which consisted of a tin bath, bamboo, wire and neon light. Another related installation Sleeping With You (2005) consisted of painted reclaimed timber and a thin neon light across a dark wall.

== Published works ==
The following books or book chapters have been authored by Emin:

- Exploration of the Soul (1994). Limited edition, 200 copies, signed inside, with two original colour photographs, provided in a hand-sewn white cloth bag with the two coloured cloth letters "TE" hand sewn in various colours.

An autobiographical short story covering Emin's conception through her life at age 13. Re-released in 2003, in an edition of 1000 by Counter Editions, though without the photographs and cloth bag.

- —, Brown, Neal; Kent, Sarah & Collings, Matthew (1998). Tracey Emin (London: Jay Jopling/White Cube, 1998); ISBN 0-9522690-2-3.
- Tracey Emin (2002), Booth-Clibborn.
- The Is Another Place (2002). Oxford: Museum of Modern Art, Oxford, Limited edition, 2002; ISBN 1-901352-15-3.
- Details of Depression (2003). Counter Editions, Cyprus/London, with author appearing as Tracey Karima Emin, limited edition, stamped on back cover. Brought together an ancient Arabic poem and a series of photographs taken around the northern part of Cyprus.
- Strangeland (2005). London: Scepter5. ISBN 0-340-76944-0. Emin's memoir, divided into three sections ("Motherland", "Fatherland" and "Traceyland"), written in the first person and conveying her life from childhood. Jeanette Winterson wrote: "Her latest writings are painfully honest, and certainly some of it should have been edited out by someone who loves her." Emin's editor for Strangeland was the British novelist Nicholas Blincoe. This book also attracted considerable media coverage and Billy Childish publicly questioned some of its accounts in newspaper articles.
- I Can Feel Your Smile (2005). New York: Lehmann Maupin.
- Tracey Emin: Works 1963 – 2006 (2006). London: Rizzoli. ISBN 0-8478-2877-8.
- Borrowed Light: the British Pavilion, Venice Biennale 2007 (2007). London: British Council. ISBN 0-86355-589-6.
- You Left Me Breathing (2008), Gagosian.
- One Thousand Drawings (2009), Rizzoli.
- Monoprint Diaries (2009), White Cube.
- Those Who Suffer Love (2009). A selection of Tracey Emin's GQ poems, with accompanying drawings.
- Love Is What You Want (2011). A survey of work from Emin's major show at the Hayward Gallery in London.
- My Life in a Column (2011).

== Miscellanea ==
A poster she photocopied and put up in the neighborhood of her home when her cat Docket went missing became an object collected by people, but was excluded by Emin from her canon.

In 2000, Emin was commissioned as part of a scheme throughout London titled Art in Sacred Spaces, to collaborate with children on an artwork at Ecclesbourne Primary School in Islington, north London. Pupils made the piece with her in Emin's style of sewing cut out letters onto a large piece of material. In 2004, the school enquired if Emin would sign the work so that the school could sell it as an original to raise funds. They planned to auction the piece for £35,000 for an arts unit, as it could not afford to display the large work. Emin and her gallery White Cube refused, saying that it was not a piece of her art, therefore reducing its value, and requested it be returned. But Emin quickly came to an agreement with the school, where she paid £4,000 to create a perspex display box for the patchwork quilt to be showcased. Taking as her theme the title "Tell me something beautiful", Emin invited eight-year-olds to nominate their ideas of beauty and then to sew the keywords in felt letters on bright fabric squares. The resulting bold patchwork featured words such as "tree", "sunrise", "dolphin" and "nan".

Art critic John Slyce, who has worked on school collaborations with artists, supported Emin and White Cube's decision saying, "This is a horrific precedent for the school to try to set. They were lucky to have an artist of that stature spending that amount of time with them ... the artwork should remain in context with the kids. Children's primary experience of art should not be as a commodity."

== Emin and feminism ==
In February 2013, she was named as one of the 100 most powerful women in the United Kingdom by Woman's Hour on BBC Radio 4.

In response to the question "Does she think society sufficiently value women artists?" Emin answered, "No. Of course not. But it's changing slowly. We probably just need another 200 years."

Emin does not overtly appear as a feminist artist, nor does she believe so herself. In an interview with Schirn Kunsthalle Frankfurt, Emin stated that she is a feminist, but not a feminist artist.

Emin discusses sexism from the viewpoint of the being a female victim. Though Emin's subversion of feminine stereotypes, Sophie Lloyd describes her work as "…[embodying] a change in perception of female sexuality that was in line with third-wave feminism, with women defining beauty and sexuality on their own terms." By narrating such harrowed and tortured memories, Emin uses vulnerability to tell not only her own struggles, but the struggles that many women may face while finding themselves.

Emin openly discusses her 1998 installation My Bed for audiences and interviewers alike. She has said, "By realizing how separate I was from it, I separated myself from the bed. I wasn't there any more." This notion of a female using the domestic space and then removing herself from the environment, thus confronting stereotypes and taboos in a confessional work was a controversial event. Feminists critics have described Emin as using the historical notion of the bedroom and its importance for female experiences, as a site for crude intervention.

John Molyneux explains in his article Emin Matters, that her work revolves around class, sex and art itself. He writes, "What she does do is present herself as culturally working class…She makes no attempt to engage in 'intellectual art speak' but sticks to unaffected everyday language," employing a strategy that doesn't place her in authority over her viewers or peers. However, her class background contradicts this tactic of equal understanding. Emin's mother until age seven owned a hotel in Margate, but bankruptcy and poverty ensued only when she broke up with Emin's father. While she may use street language, swear words, grammatical errors and misspellings to convey a primarily middle-class experience, Emin now functions as a boss of her own art business and exists within the elite upper class. Her relationship with sex is a major theme and aspect of her work. Feminist writers have reviewed Emin's pieces as containing, "…no element of eroticism or titillation…unlike in Botticelli, Renoir or Klimt. Nor is it sexual fantasy or dreams, as we might find in surrealism, or the sex of the brothel featured so heavily in late 19th-century French art. It is real, everyday sex—as experienced by her, of course, but also by millions of other people".

== Confessional nature of Emin's work ==
While studying painting at the Royal College of Art Emin became disenchanted with the art of painting, "the idea of being a bourgeois artist, making paintings that just got hung in rich people's houses was a really redundant, old fashioned idea that made no sense for the times that we were living in." She felt there was no point in making art that someone had made decades or centuries before her. "I had to create something totally new or not at all". When asked by a reporter when she decided that her life 'as Tracey Emin' was going to be her art, she replied '"I realised that I was much better than anything I'd ever made".

Why I Never Became A Dancer (1995), is a short film, set in the sea-side town of Margate where the artist grew up, narrated by Emin, about her early teenage years, using her private life as the source and subject matter of her art.

“At the time, people were saying, ‘Oh, it’s just Tracey prancing around.’ No! Listen to what I was saying,” she says vehemently, as if she’s slipped back 30 years and is confronting her critics. “See what the film’s about. Understand it.” The film tells a story of her adolescence – how she left school at 13, how she had a lot of sex with a lot of men in their 20s. And then, in 1978, at 15, she entered a disco championship. She was on the dancefloor, owning it, she was going to win – “And then they started: ‘SLAG, SLAG, SLAG.’” Most of the people taunting her were men she’d slept with. She ran out of the room in tears. But the film ends with her dancing – seizing joy from the men who tried to bring her down.

Roberta Smith of The New Yorker says of Emin's work: "In her art she tells all, all the truths, both awful and wonderful, but mostly awful, about her life. Physical and psychic pain in the form of rejection, incest, rape, abortion and sex with strangers figure in this tale, as do love, passion and joy."

== Music ==
In 1998, Emin duetted with pop singer Boy George on a song called "Burning Up", released on an 18 track audio CD that accompanied the book We love you.

In 2005, Emin compiled a CD of her favourite music called Music To Cry To, which was released and sold by the UK household furnishings retailer and brand Habitat.

In 2009, Emin designed the album artwork for a release by singer/songwriter Harper Simon, son of Paul Simon. The front cover depicts an aeroplane, drawn in Emin's scratchy monoprint style.

== Health ==
In spring 2020, Emin was diagnosed with squamous-cell bladder cancer. She underwent an operation to remove her bladder and several adjacent organs (radical cystectomy and full hysterectomy) that summer 2020. This left her in remission, with a stoma.

In December 2023, Emin was travelling from Australia to Thailand on the way back to the United Kingdom, when she experienced complications from an operation on her small intestine, which she said "nearly exploded". She was subsequently hospitalised in Phuket, Thailand.

== Charity work ==
Emin is well known for her charity work; she has raised over a million pounds for children's charities such as the NSPCC and for HIV/AIDS charities including the Terrence Higgins Trust. She frequently donates original artworks for charity auctions and has often adopted the role of auctioneer on the charity night to help increase the highest bid.

In June 2007, while returning from the Venice Biennale, Emin donated a piece of artwork. The piece was a hand-sewn blanket titled Star Trek Voyager, auctioned at Elton John's annual glamorous White Tie & Tiara Ball, a gala to raise money for The Elton John AIDS Foundation. The piece of artwork sold for £800,000 Also in June 2007, Emin's neon work Keep Me Safe reached the highest price ever (at that time) made for one of her neon works, selling for over £60,000.

Emin has participated in The Independent newspaper's Christmas Appeal for many years, where she has auctioned bespoke artworks and drawing lessons. In December 2006, her lot raised £14,000 for a one-on-one drawing lesson over champagne and cake. The following year, in December 2007, her lot raised £25,150 for a unique drawing of the highest bidder's pet, embroidered onto a cushion in Emin's trademark style.

In January 2008, Emin went to Uganda where she had set up the brand new "Tracey Emin Library" at the rural Forest High School. She explained in her newspaper column, "Schools here don't have libraries. In fact, rural areas have very little. Most have no doctor, no clinic, no hospital; schools are few and far between. Education cannot afford to be a priority, but it should be... I think this library may be just the beginning."

On Valentine's Day 2008, Emin donated a red heart-shaped neon artwork titled I Promise To Love You (2007), for a charity auction to raise money for The Global Fund, which helps women and children affected by HIV/AIDS in Africa. The auction was called (Auction) RED. The work sold for a record price of $220,000, which was much higher than the guide estimation of $60,000 to $80,000.

In 2023, Tracey Emin opened TKE Studios in Margate housing affordable spaces for professional artists to work (TKE Studio Members), as well as the ‘Tracey Emin Artist Residency’ (TEAR) programme. TKE Studio Members include Studio Lenca, Vanessa Raw and Lindsey Mendick. Graduates of TEAR include Bianca Raffaella, Helen Teede and Emmie Nume.

== Political activities ==
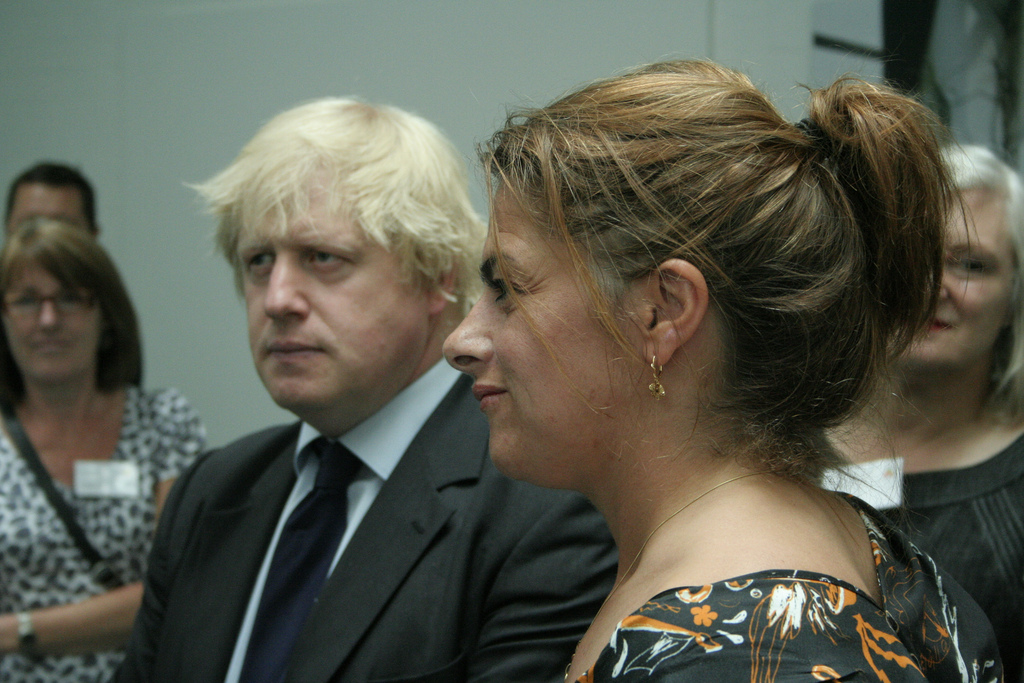
Tracey Emin with Boris Johnson in 2010. Both are prominent Britons of Turkish heritage.

Emin has been a critic of Britain's income tax regime, stating in 2009, "I'm simply not willing to pay tax at 50%", she is "very seriously considering leaving Britain" and suggests she will live in France. "The French have lower tax rates and they appreciate arts and culture." Emin has since denied that she intends to leave the country, stating that a journalist she spoke to previously exaggerated her comments, that London is her home and the context in which she belongs.

The Independent newspaper reported in August 2010 that Emin is thought of as a supporter of the Conservative Party. This was confirmed in an interview with New Statesman, where she revealed that she voted for the Conservatives at the 2010 general election, adding, "We've got the best government at the moment that we've ever had." She has stated that she is an 'outsider' in the art world, as a result of voting Conservative. She is a royalist. In a 2026 interview with The Guardian, Emin stated she voted for the Labour Party, with the exceptions of 2010 and 2015 where she had voted Conservative for ministers that had supported the arts.

In April 2014, Emin, who has a home and studio in Spitalfields, publicly called to save an East London newsagent who faced eviction from Old Spitalfields Market, after 22 years in business. She started a petition to save newsagent Ashok Patel's business, which was signed by 1,000 people.

In August 2014, Emin was one of 200 public figures who were signatories to a letter to The Guardian expressing their hope that Scotland would vote to remain part of the United Kingdom in September's referendum on that issue.

== Awards and honours ==
In 2007, London's Royal Academy of Arts elected Tracey Emin as a Royal Academician and four years later, the Academy appointed Emin a Professor of Drawing. The University of Kent also awarded Emin an honorary doctorate in 2007.

Emin was appointed Commander of the Order of the British Empire (CBE) in the 2013 New Year Honours for services to the arts. In February 2013, she was named one of the 100 most powerful women in the United Kingdom by Woman's Hour on BBC Radio 4.

Emin was made an honorary freewoman of Margate in 2022.

Emin was appointed Dame Commander of the Order of the British Empire (DBE) in the 2024 Birthday Honours for services to art.

In December 2024, Tracy Emin was included on the BBC's 100 Women list.

== Art market ==
Emin's primary galleries are White Cube in London (since 1993), Lorcan O'Neill in Rome and Xavier Hufkens in Brussels. In 2017, Emin and Lehmann Maupin ended their working relationship.

Charles Saatchi, who was best known as the most high-profile, high-spending collector of contemporary British art, bought My Bed (1998) for £150,000 ($248,000) from Lehmann Maupin's "Every Part of Me's Bleeding," the exhibition that won the artist a nomination for the 1999 Turner Prize. In 2013, on the occasion of a Christie's London sale that raised a total of 3.1 million pounds ($5 million) in aid of the Saatchi Gallery's policy of free entry, To Meet My Past (2002) sold for $778,900, establishing a new record for the artist. At another Christie's auction in 2014, My Bed was sold to White Cube founding director Jay Jopling for 2.5 million pounds, including buyer's commission, once again to benefit the Saatchi Gallery's foundation. It was estimated that the price of My Bed would sell between 800,000 and 1.2 million pounds. Before the sale, Emin said that "what I would really love is that someone did buy it and they donated it to the Tate."

Her most commonly auctioned sculptural works are phrases in her own handwriting set in neon, usually issued in editions of three, with two artist's proofs. In 2011, British Prime Minister David Cameron added an artwork with 'more passion' in neon by Emin in his private apartment at 10 Downing Street. In January 2022, Emin requested that the artwork be removed in response to the Westminster lockdown parties controversy.

In April 2014, Emin participated at The Other Art Fair for unrepresented artists.

I’ve Got It All (2000) sold at £74,500.

Like A Cloud of Blood (2022), among the first paintings Emin made following her six-month recovery from cancer treatment, was sold by the artist in October 2022 at Christie's, to benefit the Tracey Emin Foundation, in support the work of TKE Studios, a subsidised professional artist's studios with an additional twenty residencies including a free arts educational program. The deeply personal large-scale canvas sold for £2,322,000 — a new record price for a painting by the artist.

== See also ==
- What Do Artists Do All Day?
- The Louisiana Channel portrait: Tracey Emin - I Am Doing What I Think is Right (2026)
