= Carl Freedman =

British art critic and curator

Carl Freedman (born 1965) is the founder of Carl Freedman Gallery (formerly Counter Gallery). He previously worked as a writer and a curator.

== Life and career ==
=== The 1990s and the Young British Artists ===
Charles Saatchi arrived at the Gambler exhibition in a green Bentley and, according to Freedman, was immediately impressed by (and then bought) Damien Hirst's first major "animal" installation, A Thousand Years, consisting of a large glass case containing maggots and flies feeding off a rotting cow's head. (The installation was later a notable feature of the Sensation exhibition.) At this early stage, Freedman was financing the production of Hirst's vitrines, and has commented that not many people attended these early shows, including Freeze.

In 1994, Freedman toured the US with Tracey Emin, driving in a Cadillac from San Francisco to New York, making stops en route where she gave readings from her autobiographical book Exploration of the Soul to finance the trip.

The couple also spent time by the sea in Whitstable together, using the beach-hut, which she uprooted and turned into art in 1999 with the title The Last Thing I Said to You is Don't Leave Me Here, and which was destroyed (along with her "tent") in the 2004 Momart warehouse fire.

In 1995, Freedman curated the show Minky Manky at the South London Gallery. At the time Emin was relatively unknown. Freedman, concerned that he would be accused of nepotism, challenged Emin to make a great work. The result was Emin's famous "tent" Everyone I have Ever Slept With 1963–1995, which was first exhibited in the show. Freedman's interview with her appears in the catalogue. Other featured artists were Sarah Lucas, Gary Hume, Damien Hirst, Mat Collishaw, Gilbert & George, Critical Décor and Stephen Pippin. Freedman said one of the show's themes was:

the artist as a subject, and (to) explore the relationship between the art on the wall and its creator, to make the whole thing more humanistic. And in there somewhere there is the beginnings of a thesis on the relationship and similarities between madness and modernism, for example, defiance of authority, nihilism, examples of extreme relativism, strange transformations of the self, irrationality, and things like that.

== Carl Freedman Gallery ==
=== Carl Freedman Gallery London ===
In 2003, he opened Counter Gallery in Charlotte Road, Shoreditch, East London to sell original works. The opening show had works by Simon Martin, an art lecturer and YBA contemporary. In 2007, the gallery changed its name to Carl Freedman Gallery.

=== Carl Freedman Gallery Margate ===
Carl Freedman Gallery opened in Margate, Kent on Saturday 25 May 2019 with a major solo show of new work by British painter Billy Childish. After purchasing part of the old Thanet Press building in the centre of town, Carl Freedman's new HQ spans 10,000 square foot of a concrete 1960s commercial building. The site includes three exhibition spaces, an artist apartment and an upper floor dedicated to Freedman's print publishing business; Counter Editions.'This is a fantastic opportunity for us to present larger-scale solo presentations by our artists as well as more expansive curated shows. Margate is going through an amazing transformation, led by a growing art community, and we are excited to be a part of the future of the town's creative-led regeneration.' Carl Freedman.

== See also ==
- Young British Artists
