= Jake and Dinos Chapman =

English brothers, sculptors and installation artists

Iakovos "Jake" & Konstantinos "Dinos" Chapman (a.k.a. Chapman Brothers)
- Born: 1966; 1962; United Kingdom
- Known for: Visual Arts

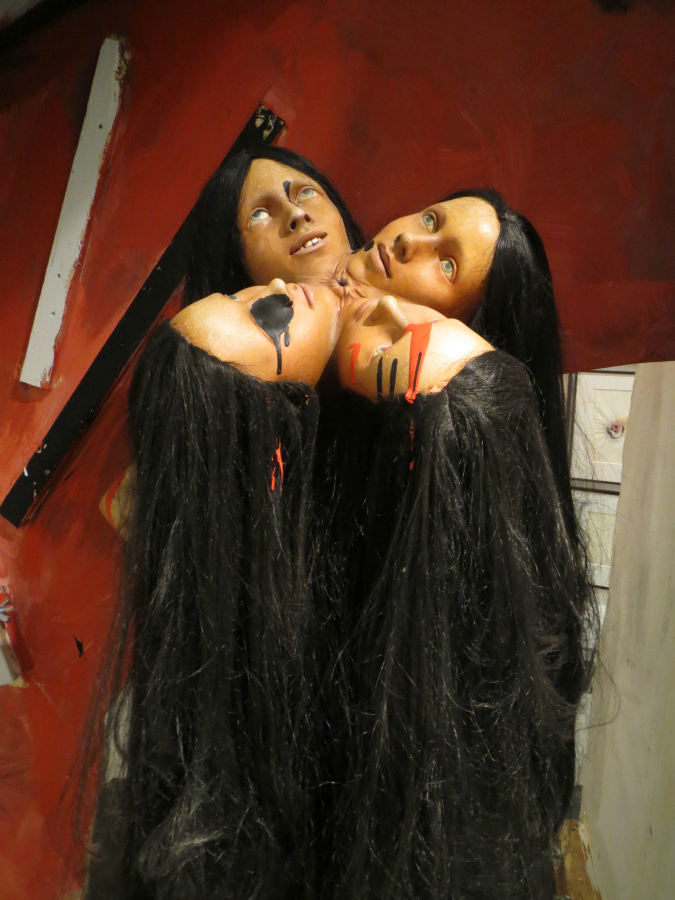
A Jake and Dinos Chapman fused mannequin piece from the exhibition Come and See at the Serpentine Gallery

Iakovos "Jake" Chapman (born 1966) and Konstantinos "Dinos" Chapman (born 1962) are British visual artists, previously known as the Chapman Brothers. Their art explores deliberately shocking subject matters; for instance, in 2008, they produced a series of works that appropriated original watercolours by Adolf Hitler. In the mid-1990s, their sculptures were included in the YBA showcase exhibitions Brilliant! and Sensation. In 2003, the two were nominated for the annual Turner Prize but lost to Grayson Perry. In 2013, their painting One Day You Will No Longer Be Loved III was the subject of Derren Brown's Channel 4 special The Great Art Robbery.

In 2022, with the announcement of Jake Chapman's solo show Me, Myself and Eye, it was disclosed that the Chapman brothers had ended their professional association. Jake Chapman made reference to mutual "seething disdain" and told the Guardian they were both "sick of the partnership" and were "no longer having fresh ideas together".

== Lives and careers ==
Jake Chapman was born in Cheltenham and Dinos Chapman in London. Their father was an English art teacher and their mother an Orthodox Greek Cypriot (hence "Jake" an anglicised diminutive of the orthodox Iakovos, and "Dinos", a typical diminutive of the orthodox Konstantinos). They were brought up in Cheltenham but moved to St Leonards-on-Sea where they attended a local comprehensive (Christ Church Primary) & (William Parker School). Dinos studied at the Ravensbourne College of Art (1980–83), Jake at the North East London Polytechnic (1985–88) before both together enrolled at the Royal College of Art (1988–90), when they also worked as assistants to the artists Gilbert and George.

=== Art collaboration ===
3D models of Goya's work

They began their own collaboration in 1991. The brothers have often made pieces with plastic models or fibreglass mannequins of people. An early piece consisted of eighty-three scenes of torture and disfigurement derivative of those recorded by Francisco Goya in his series of etchings, The Disasters of War (a work they later returned to) rendered into small three-dimensional plastic models. One of these was later turned into a life-size work, Great Deeds Against the Dead, shown along with Zygotic Acceleration, Biogenetic, De-Sublimated Libidinal Model (Enlarged x 1000) at the Sensation exhibition in 1997.

Their 1995 mannequin Two-faced Cunt was of a naked young girl with two heads joined by a vagina, which sold for £91,250 in 2011. The Chapman brothers continued with Fuck Face, a series of mannequins of children, sometimes fused together, with genitalia in place of facial features. For example, one has a male toddler wearing a bright red smock with an erect penis in place of his nose and an open anus in place of his mouth. It sold for £115,250 in 2010.

Their sculpture Hell (2000) consisted of a large number of miniature figures of Nazis arranged in nine glass cases laid out in the shape of a swastika. In 2003, with a series of works named Insult to Injury, they altered a set of Goya's etchings by adding funny faces. As a protest against this piece, performer Aaron Barschak threw a pot of red paint over Jake Chapman during a talk he was giving in May 2003. (Barshack was imprisoned for one month for the incident.) The Chapmans' oeuvre has also referenced work by William Blake, Auguste Rodin and Nicolas Poussin. Jake Chapman has published a number of catalogue essays and pieces of art criticism as well as a book, Meatphysics (Creation Books, 2003). The brothers have also designed a label for Becks beer as part of a series of limited edition labels produced by contemporary artists. Using a title from the Henry Selick film, in 2004 they curated A Nightmare Before Christmas as part of the occasional All Tomorrow's Parties music festival at Camber Sands. In October 2013 the Chapman brothers took part in Art Wars at the Saatchi Gallery curated by Ben Moore. The artists were issued with a stormtrooper helmet, which they transformed into a work of art. Proceeds went to the Missing Tom Fund set up by Moore to find his brother Tom who has been missing for over ten years. The work was also shown on the Regents Park platform as part of Art Below Regents Park.

=== The Rape of Creativity ===
From April–June 2003, the Chapmans held a solo show at Modern Art Oxford entitled The Rape of Creativity in which "the enfants terribles of Britart, bought a mint collection of Francisco Goya's most celebrated prints – and set about systematically defacing them". The Goya prints referred to his Disasters of War set of 80 etchings. The duo named their newly defaced works Insult to Injury. BBC described more of the exhibition's art: "Drawings of mutant Ronald McDonalds, a bronze sculpture of a painting showing a sad-faced Hitler in clown make-up and a major installation featuring a knackered old caravan and fake dog turds." While The Daily Telegraph commented that the Chapman brothers had "managed to raise the hackles of art historians by violating something much more sacred to the art world than the human body – another work of art", they also noted that the effect of their work was powerful.

The Chapman brothers were nominated for the Turner Prize in 2003. As well as including Insult to Injury, their Turner Prize exhibit debuted two new works Sex and Death. Sex directly referenced their previous work Great Deeds against the Dead. The original work shows three dismembered corpses hanging from a tree, Sex shows the same scenario, but in a heightened state of decay. Additionally clown's noses are now present on the skulls of the corpses; snakes, rats and insects (like those found in joke shops) cover the piece. Death is two sex dolls, placed on top of each other, head-to-toe in the 69 sex position: despite appearing to be made of plastic it is in fact cast in bronze and painted to look like plastic. That year the prize was eventually won by Grayson Perry.

On 24 May 2004, a fire in a storage warehouse destroyed many works from the Saatchi collection including Hell. The brothers subsequently made a very similar, though more extensive, work called Fucking Hell.

=== Disputes with journalists ===
In 2006, the journalist Lynn Barber claimed that she had received a death threat from the brothers, following an interview with them.

In 2007, they were criticised by journalist Johann Hari for adopting an anti-Enlightenment philosophy, and for Jake Chapman saying that the boys who murdered Liverpool toddler James Bulger performed "a good social service". This followed a public media brawl between Jake Chapman and journalist Carole Cadwalladr in The Observer and on the internet the previous year. Cadwalladr told readers that Chapman told her she made him "feel sick" and threw her out of their studio "into the pouring rain", ordering her to "get out, just get the fuck out!". Chapman made two profanity-laden, ranting, poorly-spelled public replies; the first was addressed to Cadwalladr, making reference to her "hopelessly toothless" wit and making offensive reference to things he claimed to associate with her which he stated made him "quite queasy", including "kippers" and "frumpy laura ashley blouses reeking of stale mothballs" [sic]. In the second, to The Observer, addressing Cadwalladr's employers as "unobservant dullards" and making reference to Cadwalladr as "gwendalin silverspoongob" [sic], he claimed to be "laughing at the sheer arrogance in documenting such a forgettable meeting" and concluded "you may grace your readers with the meek tones of plum-mouthed middle-Englanders, but don't send them round to my studio I'll make [...] mince meat out of them, ha ha ha."

=== Art by Adolf Hitler ===
In May 2008, White Cube gallery exhibited 13 apparently authenticated watercolours painted by Adolf Hitler, to which the brothers had added hippie motifs. Jake Chapman described most of the dictator's works as "awful landscapes" which they had "prettified". The central device and context of this exhibition were strikingly similar to those of the artist Ira Waldron in her project "Die Damen mit den Hündchen", first exhibited at the Thessaloniki Biennale of Contemporary art in May 2007. Waldron also entered into an artistic duel with Hitler, seen as a mediocre bohemian artist, by overlaying her motifs and colour on to expanded copies of thirteen of his drawings.

Also included in the Chapmans' 2008 exhibition was Fucking Hell and a series of doctored eighteenth and nineteenth century-style aristocratic portraits in oils.

In 2011, in their "Human Rainbow" and "Introspastic" series, the Chapman Brothers produced further works based on the same Hitler drawings of Geli Raubal and his dogs which had been previously appropriated by Ira Waldron in her 2007 exhibition.

=== Letter to Culture Secretary ===
On 1 October 2010, the brothers were co-signatories to an open letter to the British government's Culture Secretary Jeremy Hunt (featuring previous Turner Prize nominees winners) which opposed any future cuts in public funding for the arts.

=== Popular culture ===
The Jilly Cooper novel Pandora is set in the world of contemporary art at the turn of the millennium. In a review of the novel, Wendy Holden, writing in the New Statesman, described one scene in which a raped woman is menstruating as "Very Jake and Dinos Chapman".

== Personal lives ==
=== Jake Chapman ===
Jake married the fashion model Rosemary Ferguson in 2004. They have two children and live in the Cotswolds.

In August 2014 Chapman was quoted as saying that taking children to art galleries is a "total waste of time". The comment caused other notable artists to speak out against Chapman's thoughts.

=== Dinos Chapman ===
Dinos was married to Tiphaine de Lussy; they are now divorced. They have two daughters and lived in Spitalfields, London. He resides in Laurel Canyon, Los Angeles, with his partner Lucy Punch. They have two sons.

Both brothers are members of Arts Emergency, a British charity working with 16- to 19-year-olds in further education from diverse backgrounds.
