= Momart =

British art logistics company

Momart Ltd
- Company type: Private limited company
- Industry: Art logistics
- Founded: 25 September 1972
- Headquarters: London, England
- Area served: Worldwide
- Services: Art transport, art storage, art installation
- Revenue: £15.75 million (2015)
- Operating income: £1.21 million (2015)
- Number of employees: 131 (2015)
- Parent: FIH group plc
- Website: www.momart.com

Momart is a British company specialising in the storage, transportation, and installation of works of art. A major proportion of their business is maintaining often delicate artworks in a secure, climate-controlled environment. The company maintains specialist warehouse facilities adapted for this task. Momart's clients include the Royal Academy of Arts, the Victoria and Albert Museum, the National Gallery, Tate Modern, Tate Britain and Buckingham Palace. The company received considerable media attention in 2004 when a fire spread to one of their warehouses from an adjacent unit, destroying the works in it, including works by Young British Artists such as Tracey Emin and Damien Hirst, including Emin's 1995 piece Everyone I Have Ever Slept With 1963–1995. On 5 March 2008 Momart was taken over by Falkland Islands Holdings for £10.3 million, of which £4.6 million was in cash, £2.5 million was in shares and £3.2 million was deferred consideration.

== History ==
Momart began in 1971 as the "Jim Moyes's Compendium of Working Possibilities", with its founder, himself an artist, offering installation, display, handling, transport and framing services to up and coming artists and emergent galleries in London. Early users of the service included David Hockney, Howard Hodgkin and Francis Bacon. The client base quickly grew by word of mouth in recognition of the service levels being offered and in September 1972 the company was registered as Momart Limited – an amalgam of Jim Moyes and new partner Rees Martin. Rees subsequently left the business but the brand was becoming well established so the name remained.

The company set up its first office on Richmond Road, Hackney in East London and continued to grow organically – moving art, painting gallery walls, making frames and cases, hanging paintings, slinging sculpture and providing art storage. By 1985 Momart had gained a solid reputation amongst the commercial galleries and artists and started to introduce its credentials to the public sector such as the Victoria & Albert Museum, the National Gallery, Tate, Royal Academy and other UK based art institutions.

In 1985, Momart commissioned the UK's first fine art vehicle with temperature control and air ride suspension and carried out its first museum job on behalf of the Royal Academy – a Henry Moore exhibition. Momart was by then able to undertake all of the transport handling requirements completely in-house, including making site visits to the individual lenders where required, case making, transport of the empty cases to the lenders, pack on site and delivery of the case loan to the borrower.

From 1988 Momart expanded the services to include the international movement of artworks on behalf of both commercial and museum clients overseas. This prompted close analysis and investigation of the various case making options and specifications and in 1991, in collaboration with Tate, the company assisted with the development and the standard specification for museum cases for touring exhibitions and for sending artworks worldwide. This was then presented at the Art in Transit Conference in Washington DC. Momart's client base continued to expand. In the late 1980s the company started working for the Royal Collection and, in 1993, in recognition of the high quality of service provided by Momart, Queen Elizabeth II appointed Momart as a Royal warrant holder.

In 2001 Momart and five other international fine art transport agents founded the professional association ARTIM, whose members monitor each other's service levels both professionally and financially. ARTIM comprises the leading fine art agents worldwide who have the highest standards of service. Agents wishing to join ARTIM have to be voted in with a majority vote by the Founders' Committee before becoming members.

In 2003 Momart invested in new premises in Leyton, with a new plant and equipment and room for expansion. This included a new state-of-the-art workshop, storage facilities and transport office with Hackney remaining as the office base for the project coordination, administration and some satellite warehousing. This investment improved efficiency and capacity for increased storage business. In the same year Momart was granted Listed Agent status with the Department for Transport (DfT) allowing certified Momart employees to carry out hand search procedures on client artworks to avoid the need for X-raying at the airport of departure.

=== 2004 warehouse fire ===
In the early hours of 24 May 2004 a fire broke out at the Cromwell industrial estate in Leyton, east London. According to the fire investigation report, the flames that caught between 1:45 am and 3:15 am that morning were started deliberately, after burglars broke into a unit located at the extreme south-western corner of the estate and leased to an individual business repairing consumer electronics.

The fire spread through the adjoining units at the estate, eventually reaching and destroying a warehouse then operated by Momart. The blaze destroyed more than 100 works by some of Britain's leading contemporary artists including Tracey Emin, Damien Hirst, Sarah Lucas, Gary Hume, Jake and Dinos Chapman, Helen Chadwick and others. Many of those works were owned by Charles Saatchi, the country's biggest collector of modern art.

Art industry insiders noted at the time that the insurance value of the works lost in the fire would be many times their initial purchase price, and that a comparable rise could be expected in the market values of the remaining and future works by artists whose works were lost. The total value of artworks lost was estimated at between £30 and £50 million.

A number of artists, in a joint action with several insurance firms, alleged negligence and pursued a legal case against Momart. The case was settled out of court in a mediated agreement for an undisclosed fee, reported to be in the order of "tens of millions of pounds".

=== Acquisition ===
In 2008 Momart was acquired by Falkland Islands Holdings (FIH), an international services group that owns services businesses focused on transport and logistics. Following the acquisition, Momart's key management and staff has continued to work within the group to drive the company's continued expansion, particularly in rapidly growing overseas markets. In that same year Momart's administrative offices were moved from Hackney to Whitechapel from where the company operated all of the administration, coordination, shipping, finance, and IT services.

In 2009 HMRC granted Momart the then-unique privilege amongst fine art transport companies to undertake all of its customs procedures in-house. In 2011, Momart was certified as an Authorised Economic Operator (AEO), enabling the company to simplify customs bureaucracy and speed up passage within the EU for their clients.

In 2013 the company relocated its head office to South Quay, East London where it currently resides. In 2016 Momart expanded its storage facilities in Leyton, East London, with a new purpose-built unit providing additional 2,500 square metres (27,000 sq ft) of specialist art storage space.

== Momart Christmas card series ==
The tradition of the Christmas card goes back to 1984 when the first object – a festive card – was designed for the company by Bruce McLean. Since then Momart collaborated on this project with many of the top British and international artists. The complete series of Momart Christmas card is now part of the permanent collections of the Victoria and Albert Museum and the Tate.

The artists represented in past Christmas cards are:

- 1984 — Bruce McLean
- 1985 — Richard Wentworth
- 1986 — David Inshaw
- 1987 — Tim Head
- 1988 — Gillian Ayres
- 1989 — Barry Flanagan
- 1990 — Bill Woodrow
- 1991 — Eduardo Paolozzi
- 1992 — Helen Chadwick
- 1993 — Anthony Caro
- 1994 — Paula Rego
- 1995 — Peter Blake
- 1996 — Richard Deacon
- 1997 — Damien Hirst
- 1998 — Langlands & Bell
- 1999 — Tracey Emin
- 2000 — Gary Hume
- 2001 — Mark Wallinger
- 2002 — Howard Hodgkin
- 2003 — Lucian Freud
- 2004 — Paul McDevitt
- 2005 — David Hockney
- 2006 — Ron Mueck
- 2007 — Sarah Lucas
- 2008 — Richard Hughes
- 2009 — Catherine Yass
- 2010 — Joel Peers & Toby Ziegler
- 2011 — Gavin Turk
- 2013 — Glenn Brown
- 2014 — Patrick Hughes
- 2015 — Clare Woods
- 2016 — Paul Fryer
- 2017 — Des Hughes
- 2018 — Conrad Shawcross
- 2019 — Idris Khan
- 2020 — Phlegm
- 2023 — Alvaro Barrington

== See also ==
- Young British Artists
- Tracey Emin
- Damien Hirst
- Saatchi Gallery
