= Geneva University Hospitals =

Geography
- Location: Geneva, Switzerland
- Coordinates: 46°11′36″N 6°08′54″E

Organisation
- Affiliated university: University of Geneva

Services
- Beds: 1920

History
- Founded: 1995

Links
- Website: www.hug.ch
- Lists: Hospitals in Switzerland

The Geneva University Hospitals (French: Hôpitaux universitaires de Genève, HUG) is one of the five university hospitals of Switzerland and the largest one in the country. It is one of the largest hospitals in Europe.

First founded in 1535, the creation of the HUG dates back to 1995 as a merger of all public hospitals in Geneva. The HUG operates 8 hospitals in the Canton of Geneva and 40 outpatient clinics.

== Description ==
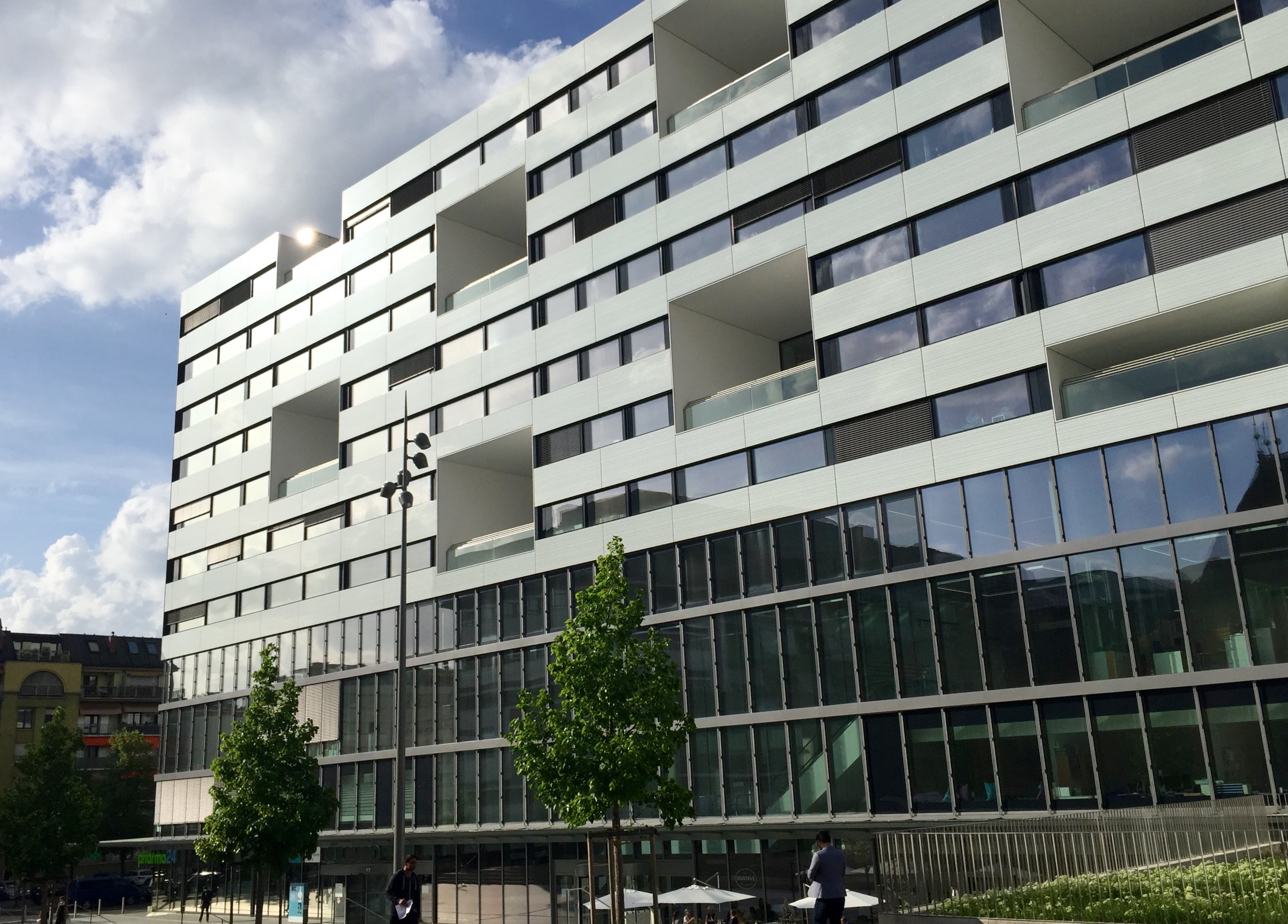
The Julliard Hospital Building

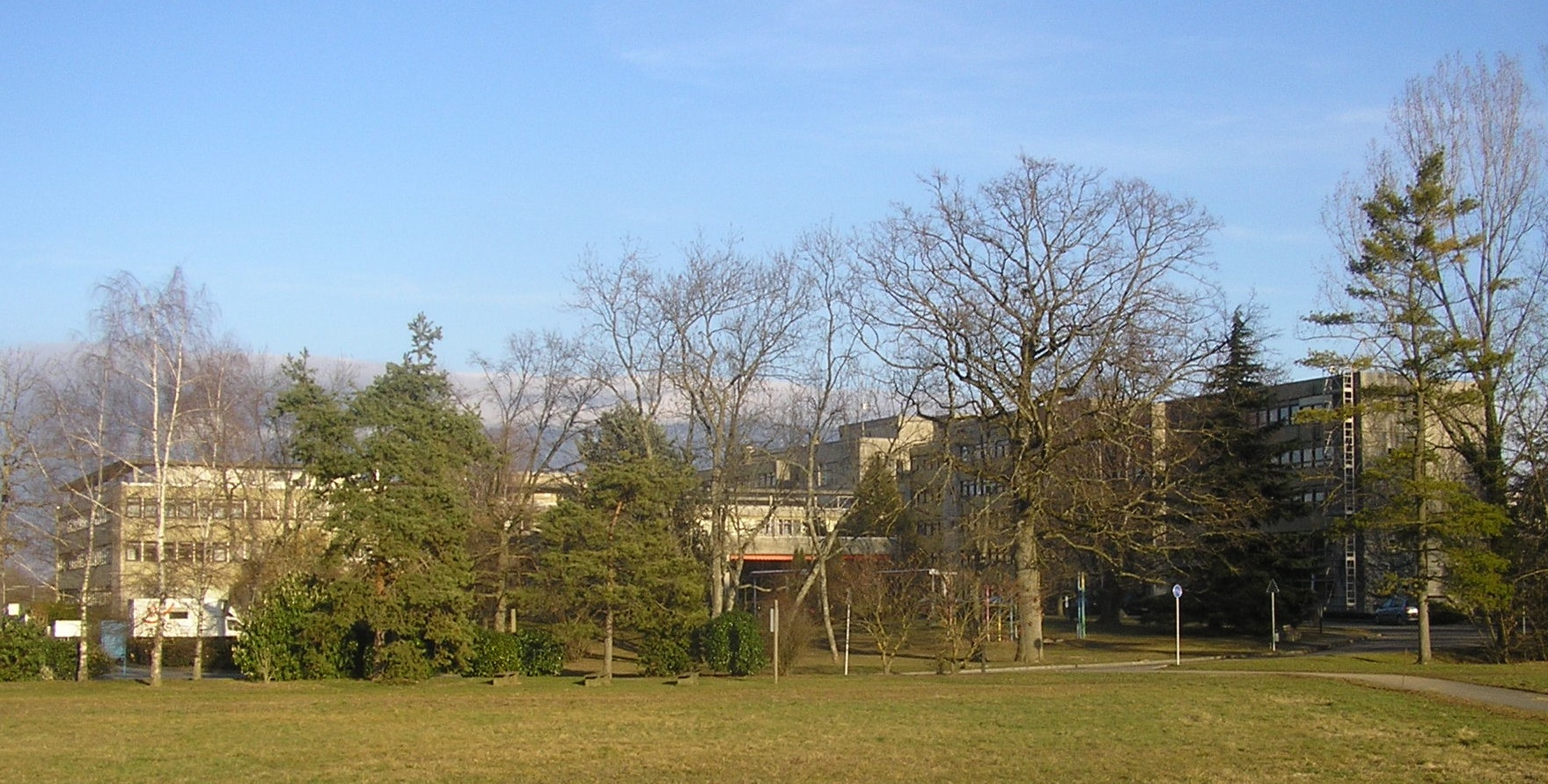
General view of Trois-Chêne Hospital geriatrics or rehabilitation treatments for Geneva University Hospitals

The Geneva University Hospitals includes 8 public hospitals, 2 clinics and 40 outpatient care centers with more than 13 086 employees (including 9 513 nurses and doctors). This hospital is not only a local hospital for the city of Geneva, but also the reference hospital for the rest of the canton, and together with the CHUV Lausanne, the reference hospital for French-speaking Switzerland. It is attached to the University of Geneva Faculty of Medicine, and is one of five university hospitals in Switzerland; the others are in Basel, Bern, Lausanne and Zurich.

== History ==
In 1602, the General Hospital—created from the merger of seven medieval hospitals—was simultaneously a hospital, a hospice, an orphanage, a retirement home, an asylum and a reformatory. After becoming cantonal hospitals in 1856, the HUG were turned into university hospitals in 1995 as part of the hospital reform required by authorities. Today, the HUG are regional and reference hospitals for advanced medicine. They promote access to care for everyone and the development of centers of excellence in conjunction with the University of Geneva.

Historical dates:

- 1602 - The general hospital is founded by combining seven hospitals that existed in the Middle Ages.
- 1712 - Reconstruction of the General Hospital at the site where the Geneva Courthouse is located today.
- 1856 - Cantonal Hospital opens following the separation of social assistance duties, assigned to the General Hospice, and medical assistance duties.
- 1875 - Maternity Division is established on Prévost-Martin Street, and the construction of several buildings in the hospital district begins.
- 1900 - Two asylums open outside the city: one in Loëx for terminal and non-contagious patients and one at the Bel-Air location, which becomes Belle-Idée, for the mental patients (psychiatry).
- 1915 - The surgery facility is under construction, marking the development of a cutting-edge specialty in Geneva to secure a strong tradition.
- 1943 - Phased construction of the Cluse-Roseraie location continues for a period of 50 years.
- 1961 - The Children's Hospital opens to allow the Geneva pediatrics sector to develop an academic dimension that's linked to research and teaching.
- 1972 - The Geriatric Hospital opens, now Trois-Chêne Hospital, which coincides with the emergence of aging medicine as a specialization as well as research in to the biology of aging.
- 1992 - Commissioning of the Opera zone that is equipped with state-of-the-art operating rooms with laminar flow to fulfill the most advanced medical and technical requirements.
- 1995 - The University Hospitals is created and organizes public hospitals into medical departments and promotes close collaboration with the health care system.
- 2001 - Expansion work in Emergency, Maternity and the Children's Hospital is completed.
- 2011 - Two projects launch: BatLab, dedicated to laboratories and research, and a new hospital building with rooms having 1 or 2 beds.
- 2015 - BatLab opens [archive], a building dedicated to laboratories and research.
- 2016 - Clinics in Joli-Mont (Geneva) and Montana (Crans-Montana (Valais)) join the HUG.
- 2017 - The new Gustave Julliard hospital building opens.
- 2023 - The "Maison de l'Enfance et de l'Adolescence* (MEA) opens, offering mental health care for children and adolescents, as well as medical consultations for young people up to the age of 25.

== Geography ==
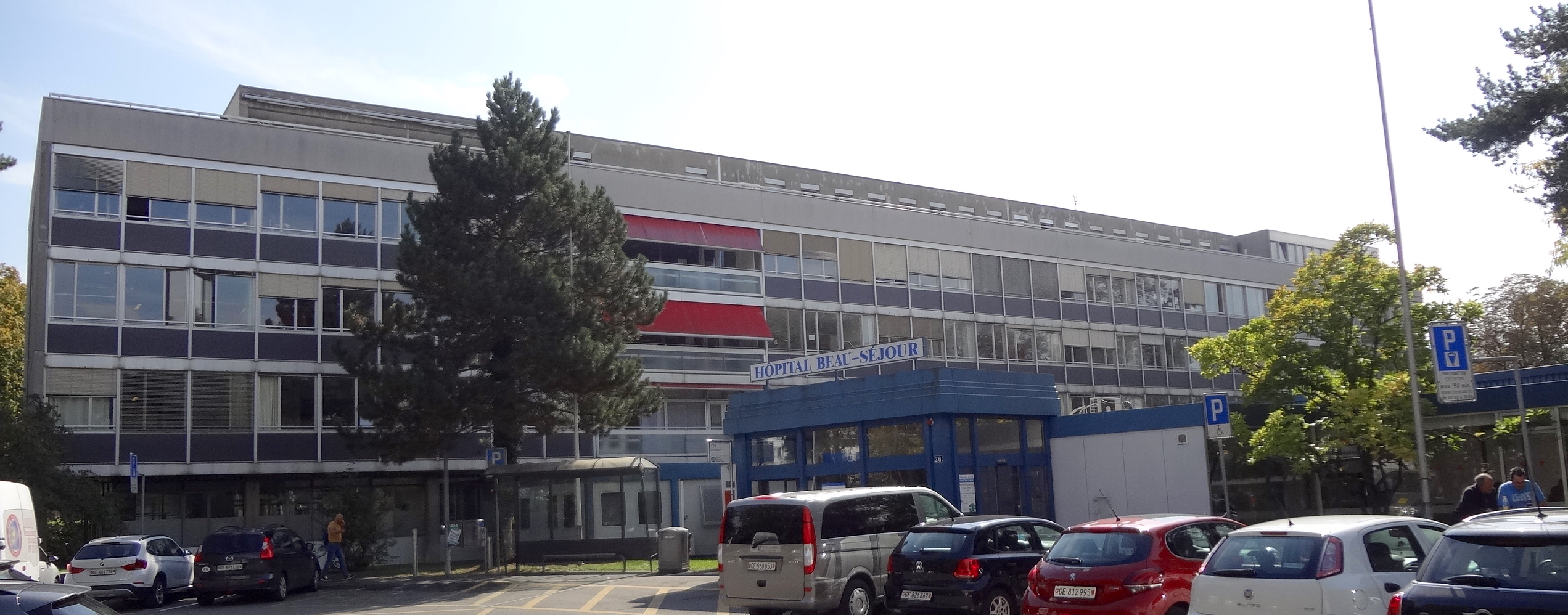
Beau Sejour hospital, rehabilitation treatments for Geneva University Hospitals

With a presence in the entire canton of Geneva, including around forty outpatient facilities, the HUG includes eight hospitals spread over six locations (Cluse-Roseraie, Beau-Séjour, Bellerive, Belle-Idea, Loex and Trois-Chêne) and two clinics: one in the canton of Geneva (Joli-Mont) and the other in Valais (Montana).

- The Main Hospital at the Cluse-Roseraie location combines the Lina Stern and Gustave Julliard Hospital buildings for short-stay services and has an emergency unit, an intensive care unit, operating rooms and state-of-the-art research facilities. It also includes a private ward. As of 2016, the six buildings at the Cluse - Roseraie location have been renamed (Lina Stern, Valerie Gasparin, Louise Morier, Jean-Louis Prévost, Gustave Julliard, David Klein).
- Maternity, leading Switzerland in the number of births, includes prenatal and post-natal hospitalization units, delivery rooms and an operating room. It also has a gynecology and obstetrics emergency department and houses the breast center.
- The Children's Hospital provides care to children from birth to 16 years of age for all conditions (including child psychiatric patients up to 18 years of age). It is the only center in Switzerland for children's liver transplants.
- Beau-Séjour Hospital [archive] admits people who need rheumatology care, rehabilitation treatments and neuro-rehabilitation therapies involving a wide range of professionals. It has a swimming pool, a climbing wall and rehabilitation equipment that combines robotics and IT.
- The Trois-Chêne Hospital [archive], in the heart of a large park, admits people whose health status requires hospitalization in geriatrics or rehabilitation treatments. This hospital has a complete medical imaging facility installed in 2015.
- The Loëx Hospital provides medical rehabilitation and accommodation with adapted care for people waiting for placement. It has a day hospital and provides consultations attached to community geriatrics at the location.
- The Bellerive Hospital [archive], formerly Cesco, a pioneer in palliative care in Switzerland, admits people whose health status requires hospitalization for medical rehabilitation care, for example to recover after neurological damage, and palliative care.
- The Belle-Idée psychiatric hospital houses part of the hospital units for general or specialized psychiatry, as well as the community geriatric unit.
- The Joli-Mont Clinic admits patients in rehabilitation and following medical or surgical care.
- The Montana Clinic specializes in rehabilitation in general internal medicine, psychosomatic and post-operative care, as well as chronic patient care.

== Activity ==
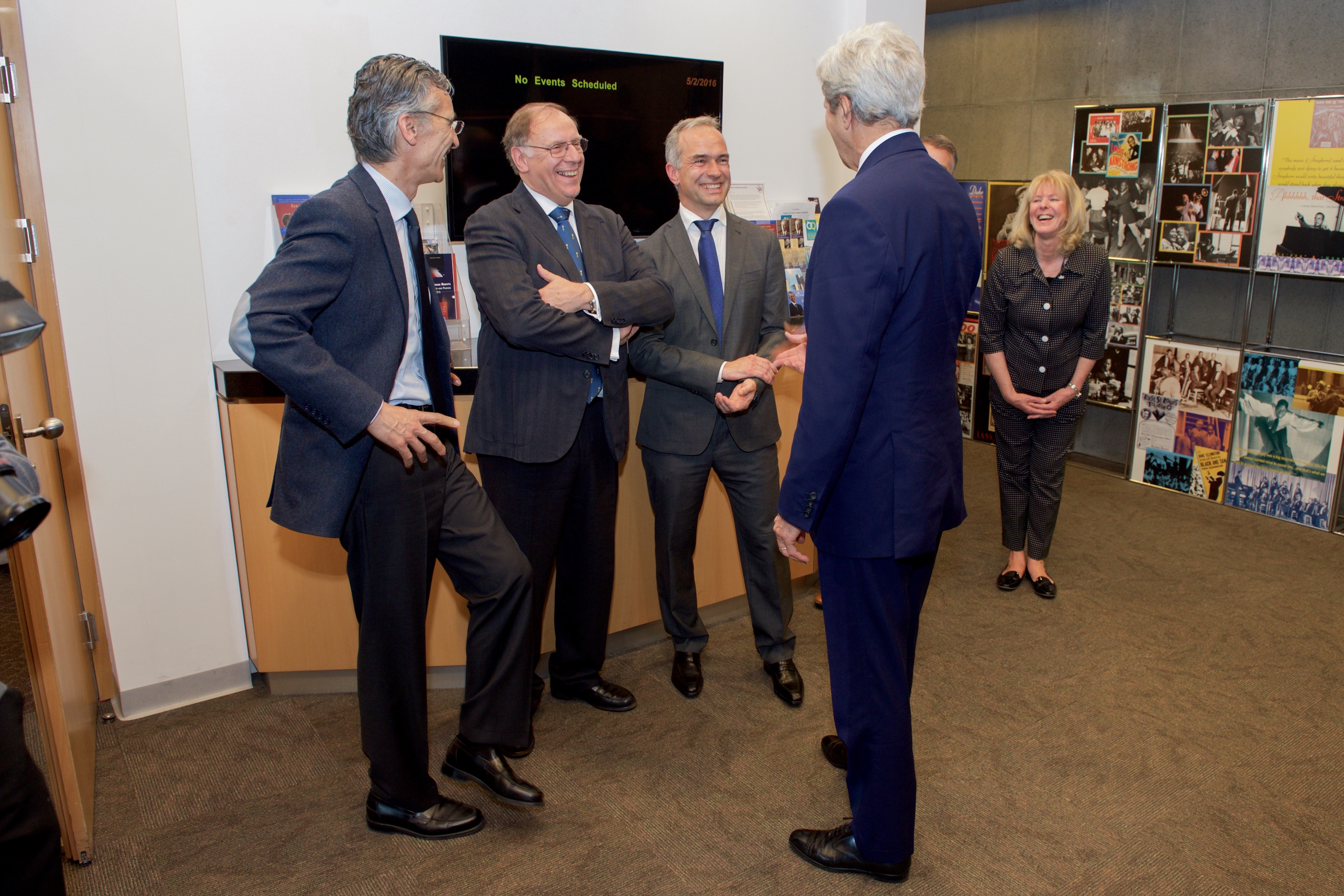
U.S. Secretary of State John Kerry meets with doctors from the University Hospitals of Geneva in Geneva, Switzerland, on May 2, 2016, while visiting the U.S. Mission in Geneva.

Geneva law entrusts the HUG with three main missions:

- Treatment: the HUG meets the needs of a community of 500,000 residents and handle 146 767 emergency care in 2024.
- Teaching: in collaboration with the University of Geneva Faculty of Medicine, the professional schools (particularly the HEDS, College of Health [Haute Ecole de Santé]) and the CIS (Interprofessional Simulation Center [Centre Interprofessionnel de Simulation]), the HUG train more than 1 230 physicians, (interns and clinic leaders) and around 204 apprentices (in the field of health and in administrative or technical fields) in 2024.
- Research: in conjunction with the University of Geneva Faculty of Medicine and with support from private and public foundations, the HUG run projects to improve treatments for patients.

== Structure ==
The HUG are organized into centers, departments, directorates, laboratories, divisions and units. Medical departments:

- Department of Anesthesiology, Department of Pharmacology and Intensive Care Department
- Surgery Department
- Child and Adolescent Department
- Department of Gynecology and Obstetrics
- Imaging and Medical Information Sciences Department
- Department of Community, Primary Care and Emergency Medicine
- Department of Genetics and Laboratory Medicine
- Department of Internal Medicine, Rehabilitation and Geriatrics
- Clinical Neurosciences Department
- Oncology Department
- Department of Rehabilitation and Palliative Medicine
- Mental Health and Psychiatry Department
- Medical Specialties Department

Translational research laboratories:

- Laboratory associated with the Foundation for New Surgery Technologies (FNTC [Fondation pour Les Nouvelles Technologies Chirurgicales])
- Cellular Therapies Laboratory

The HUG is headed by a board of directors that delegates operational decisions to the chief executive officer of an executive committee that includes representatives from professional areas. Most management operations are assigned to departments. The Rega-HUG partner base of the Swiss Rescue Air Guard is located at the Geneva Airport.

== Personnel ==
The HUG is one of the leading employers in the Canton of Geneva. In 2024, 13 086 people worked in 160 different jobs at the HUG. Of these, 72,7% worked as care providers and physicians, 14,4% as administrative staff, and 12,9% as technical and logistics personnel.

== Initial, continuing and post-graduate training ==
In 2024, the HUG trained 954 in-house physicians, 276 WFH training clinic leaders, 1 645 health professional trainees, 204 apprentices, 1 365 medical trainees and 368 other trainees.

== Associated institutions ==
- Center for Biomedical Imaging (CIBM)
- University Centre of Legal Medicine (CURML)
- École romande de santé publique (ERSP)

== Notable affiliates ==
- Anne Beaumanoir,(1923-2022) neurophysiologist
- Gabrielle Perret-Gentil (1910-1999), Gynecologist and Obstetrician
- Julian de Ajuriaguerra (1911-1993), Psychiatrist
- Adolphe Franceschetti (1896-1968), Ophthalmologist
- Louis Jurine (1751-1819), Surgeon
- David Klein (1908-1993) Ophthalmologist
- Georges de Morsier (1894-1982), Neurologist
- Didier Pittet (1957- ), Specialist in Infectious Diseases and Epidemiologist
- Theodor Landis (1945- ), Neurology
- Barbara Polla (1950- ), Allergy Specialist
- Pierre Pollak (1950- ), Neurologist
- Jean-Louis Prévost (1838-1927), Neurologist
- Charles-Henri Rapin, (1947-2008), Geriatrics Specialist
- Daniel Schechter, (1962- ), Psychiatrist

== Gallery ==
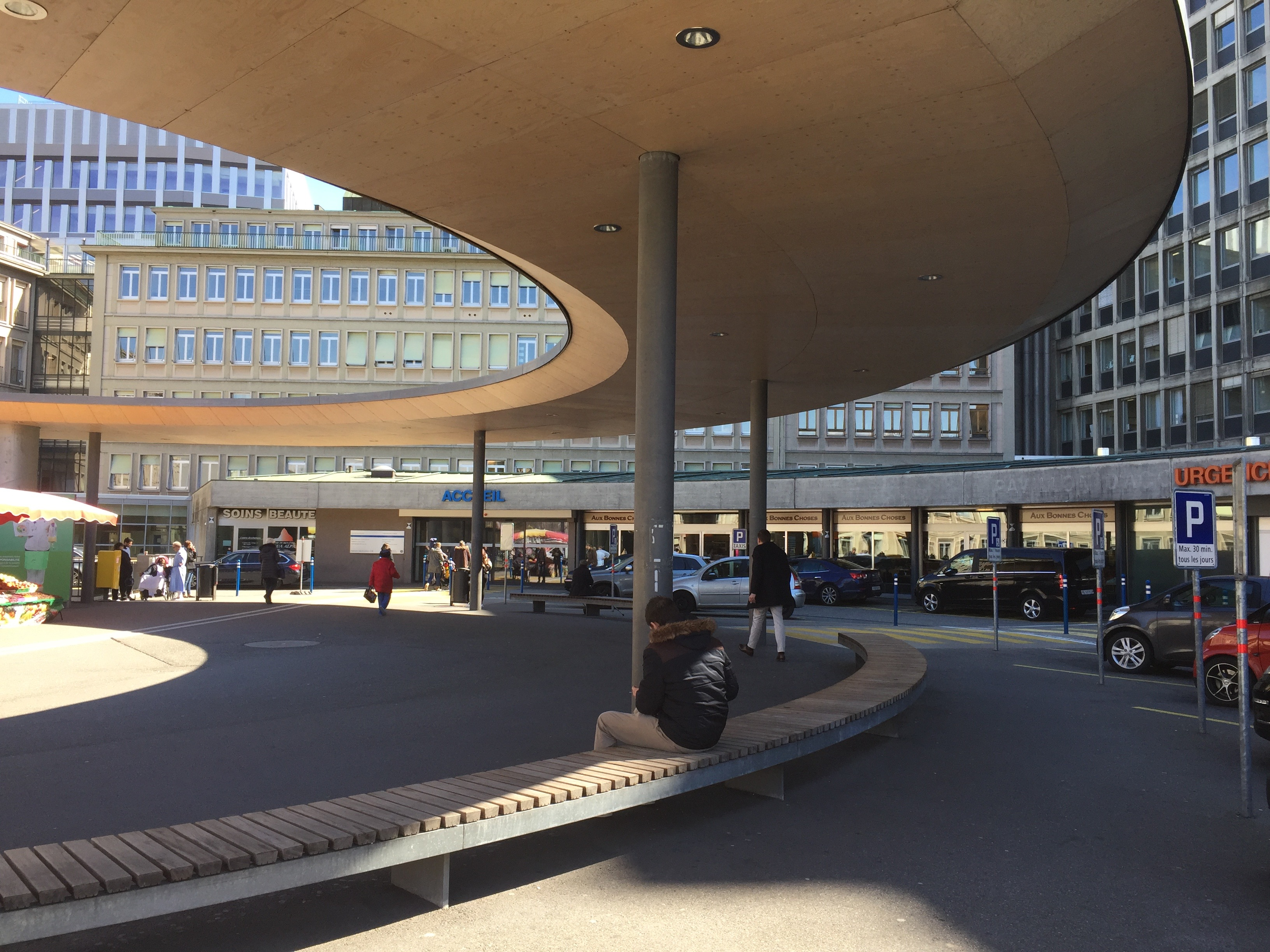
HUG's main entrance

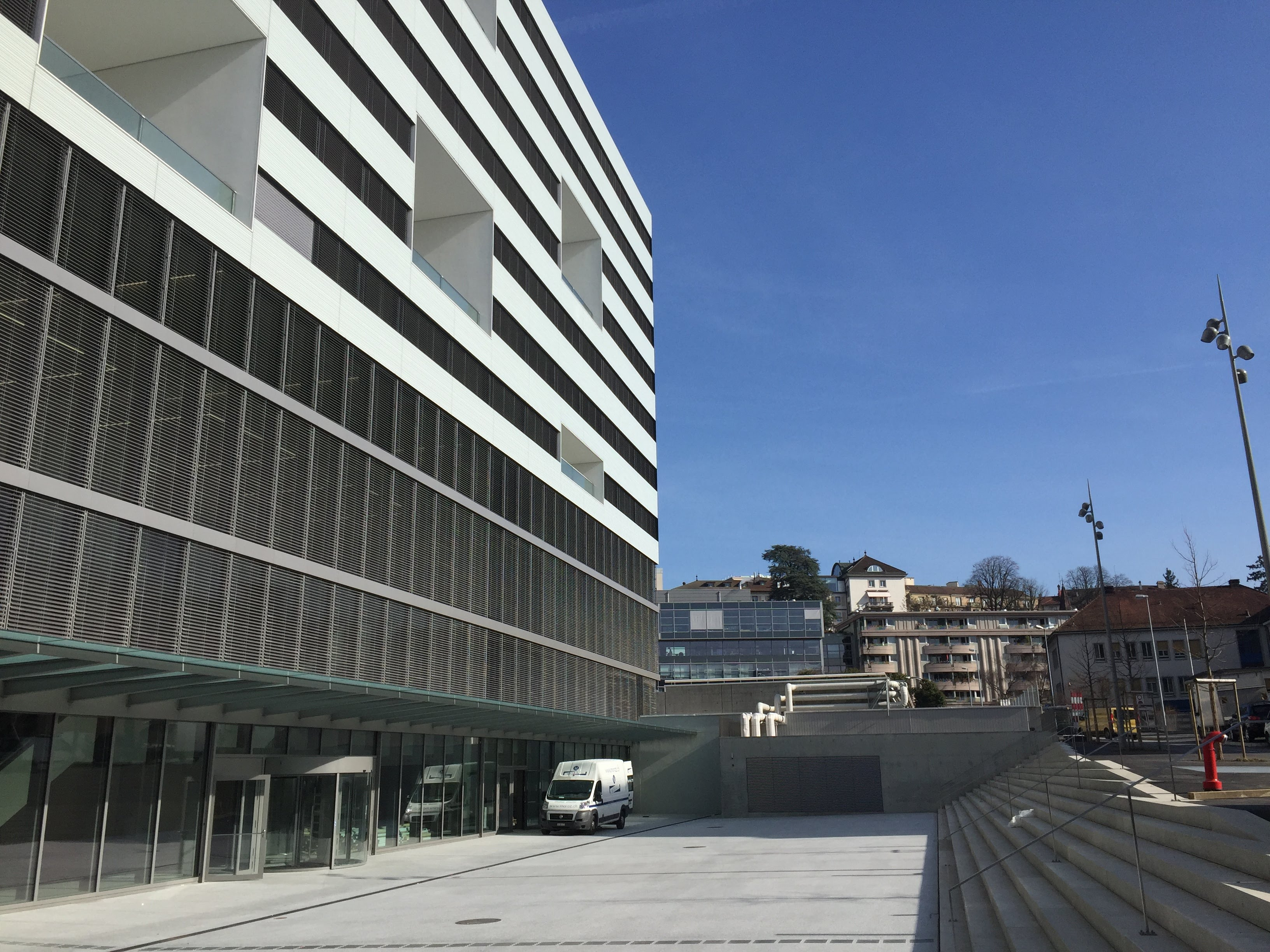
The Julliard building

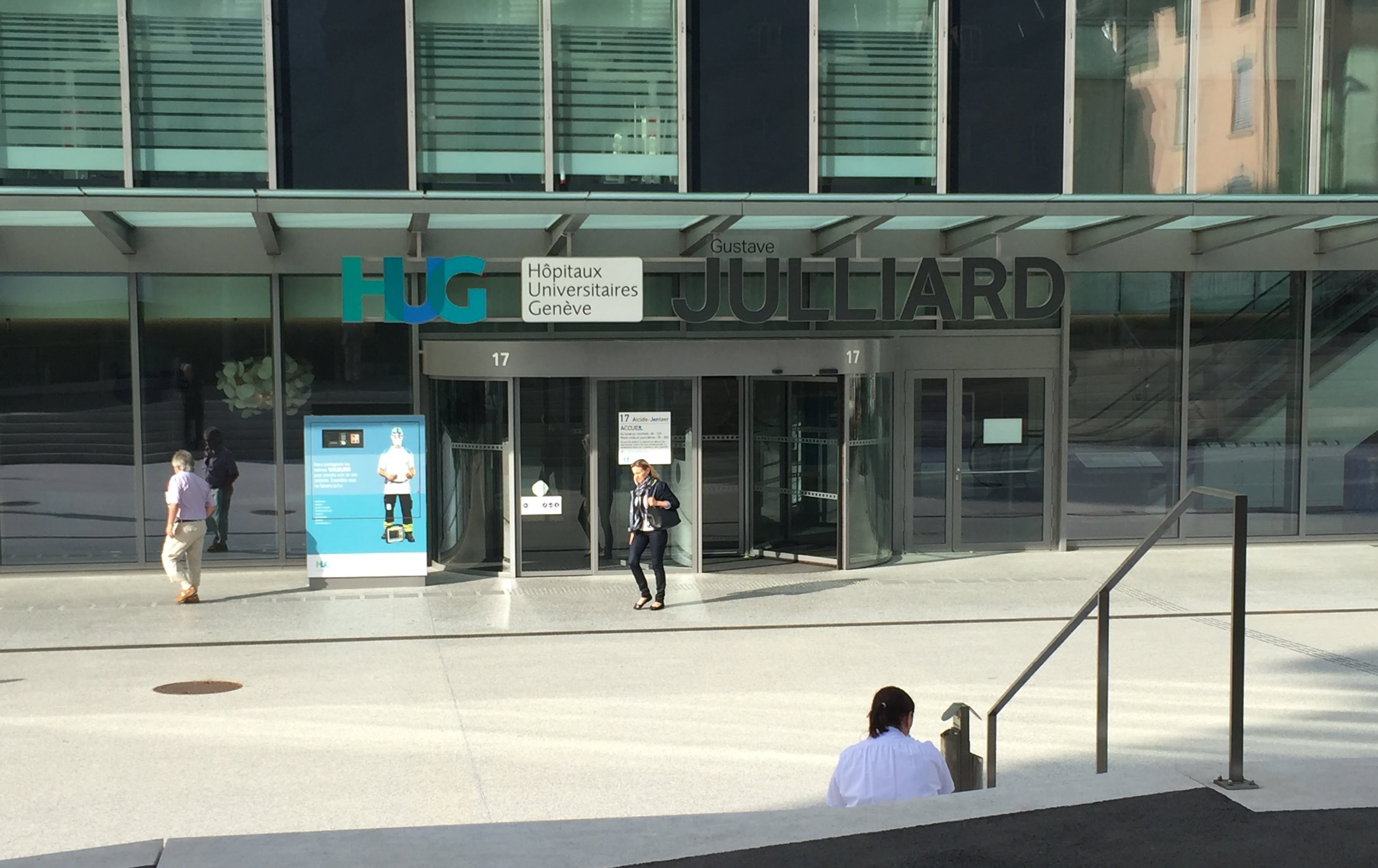
Entrance of the Julliard building

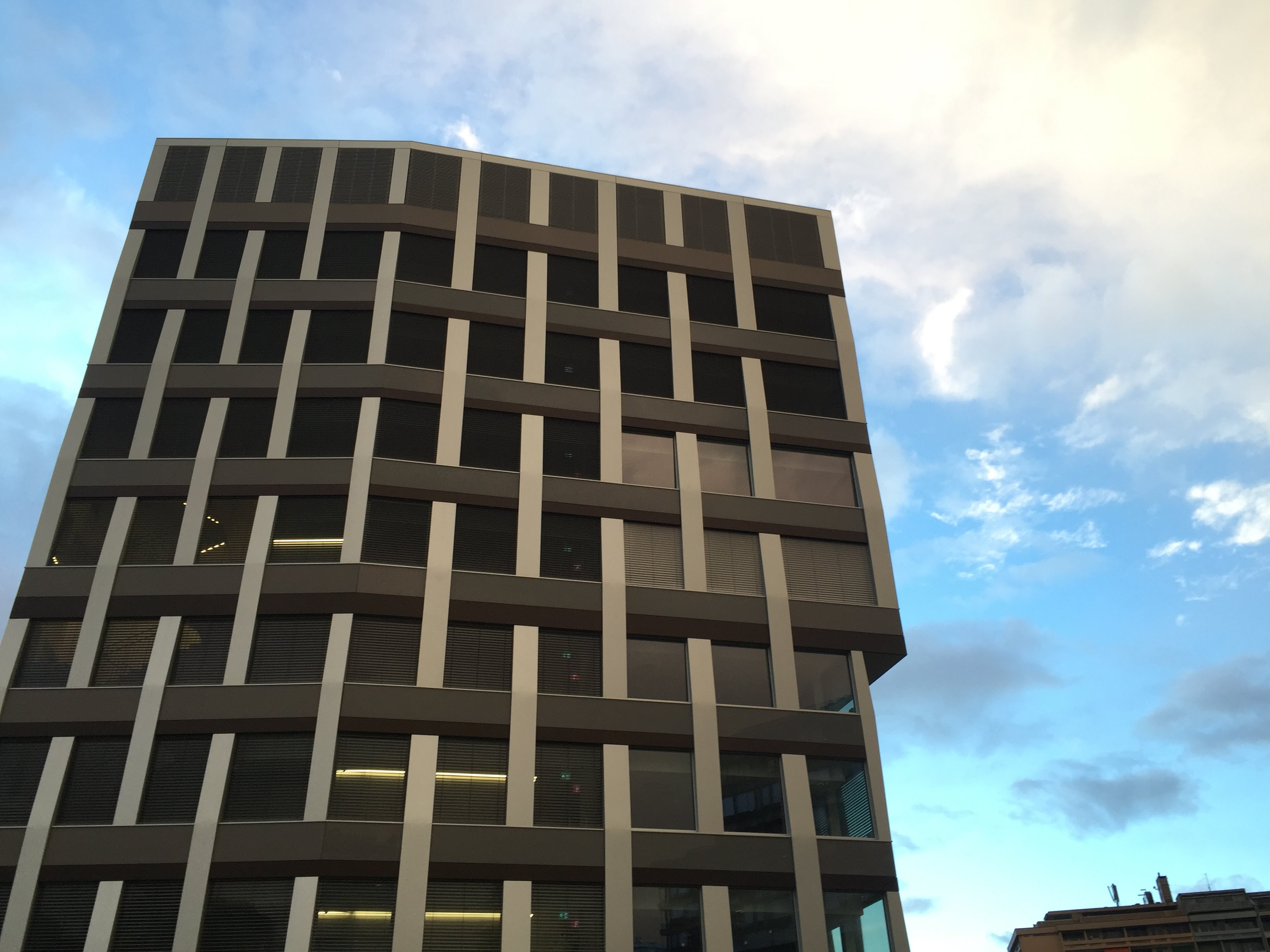
The laboratory building

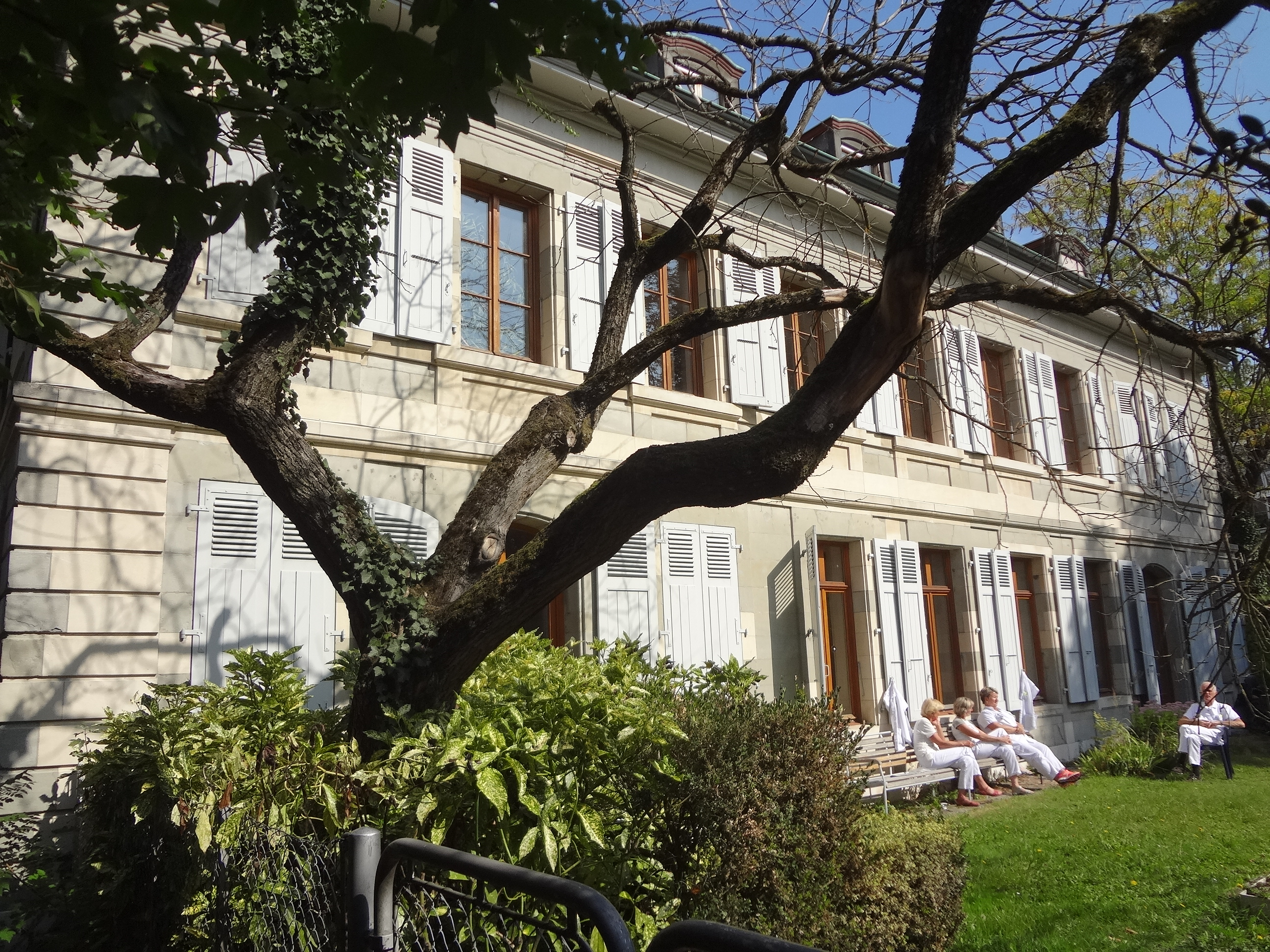
The Beau-Séjour Hospital, the Louis XVI Pavilion

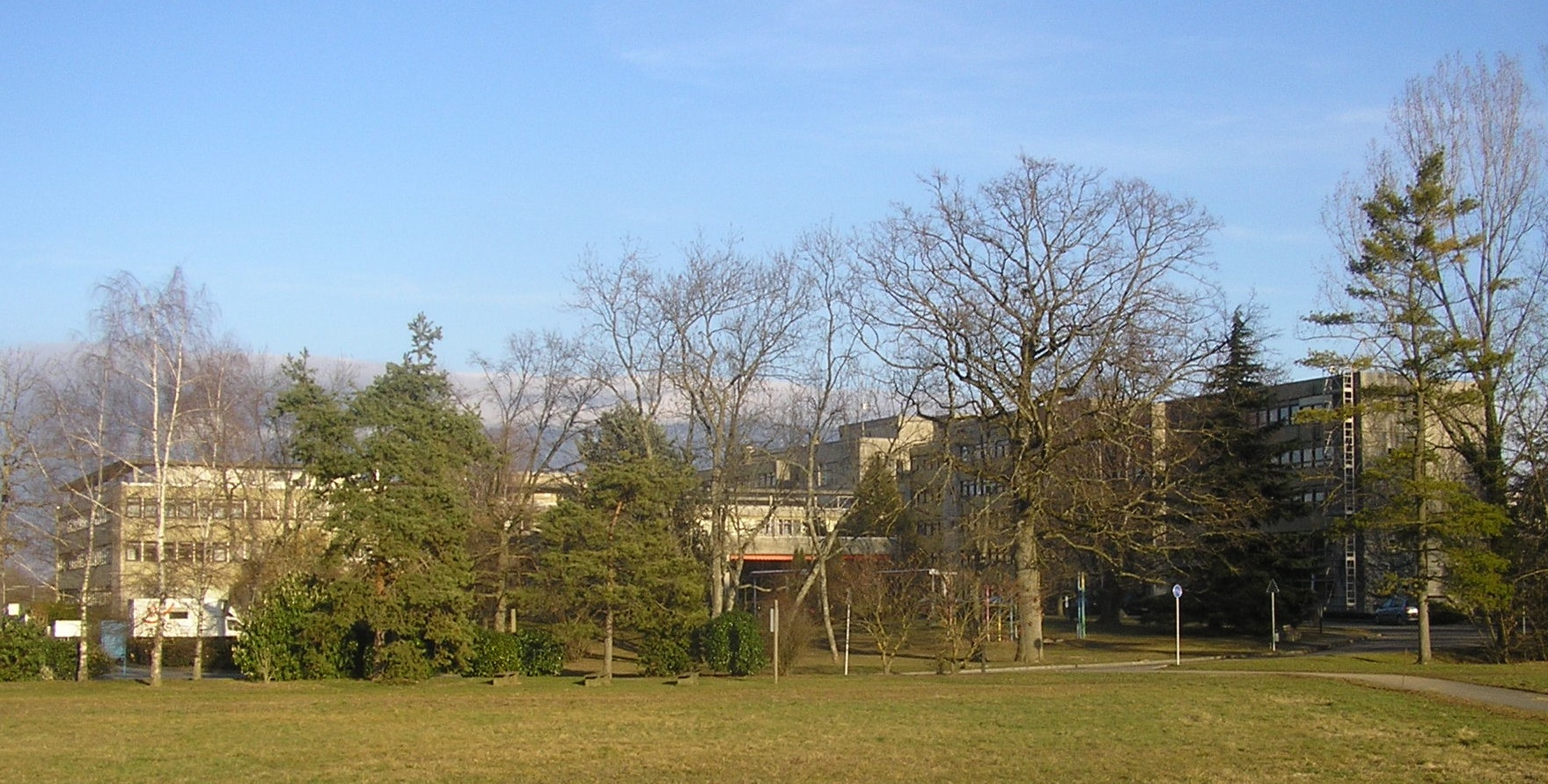
The hospital of Trois-Chêne

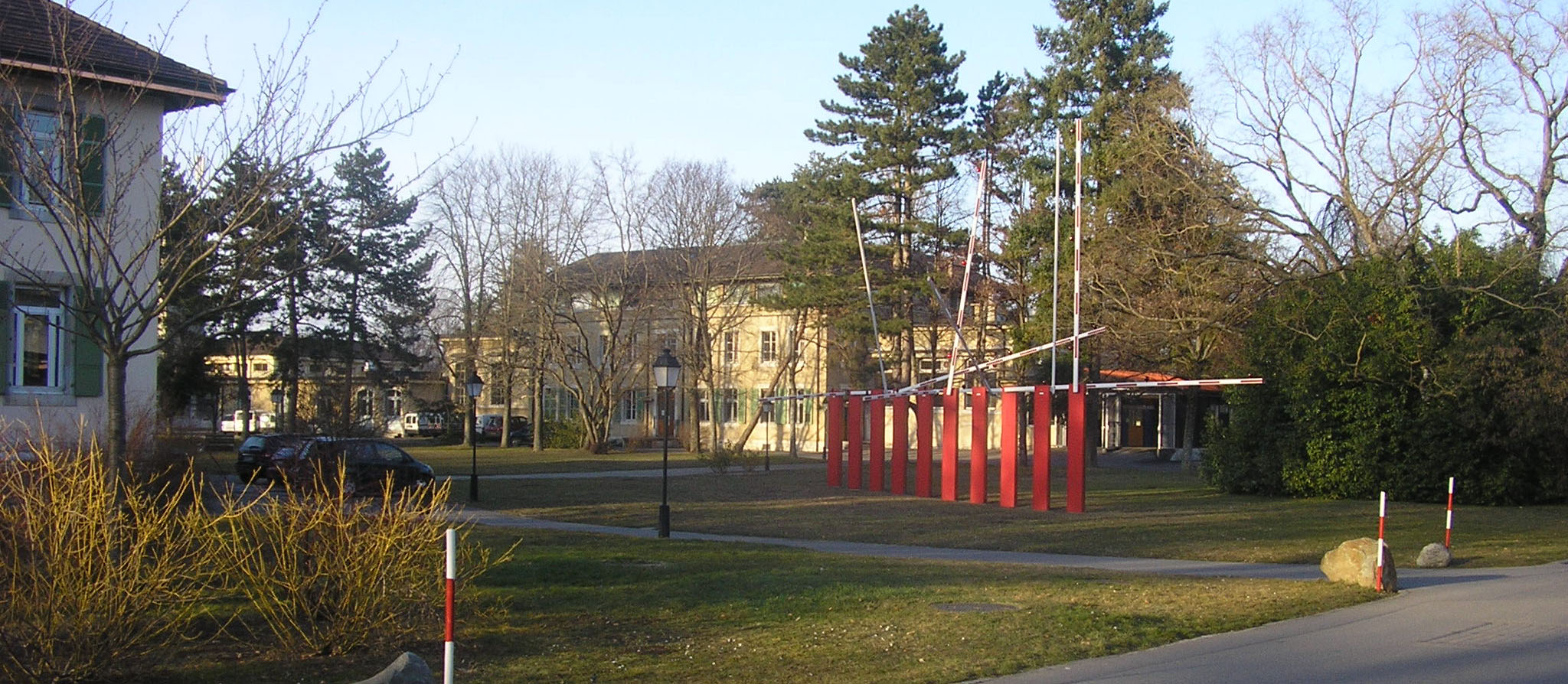
The HUG psychiatric hospital

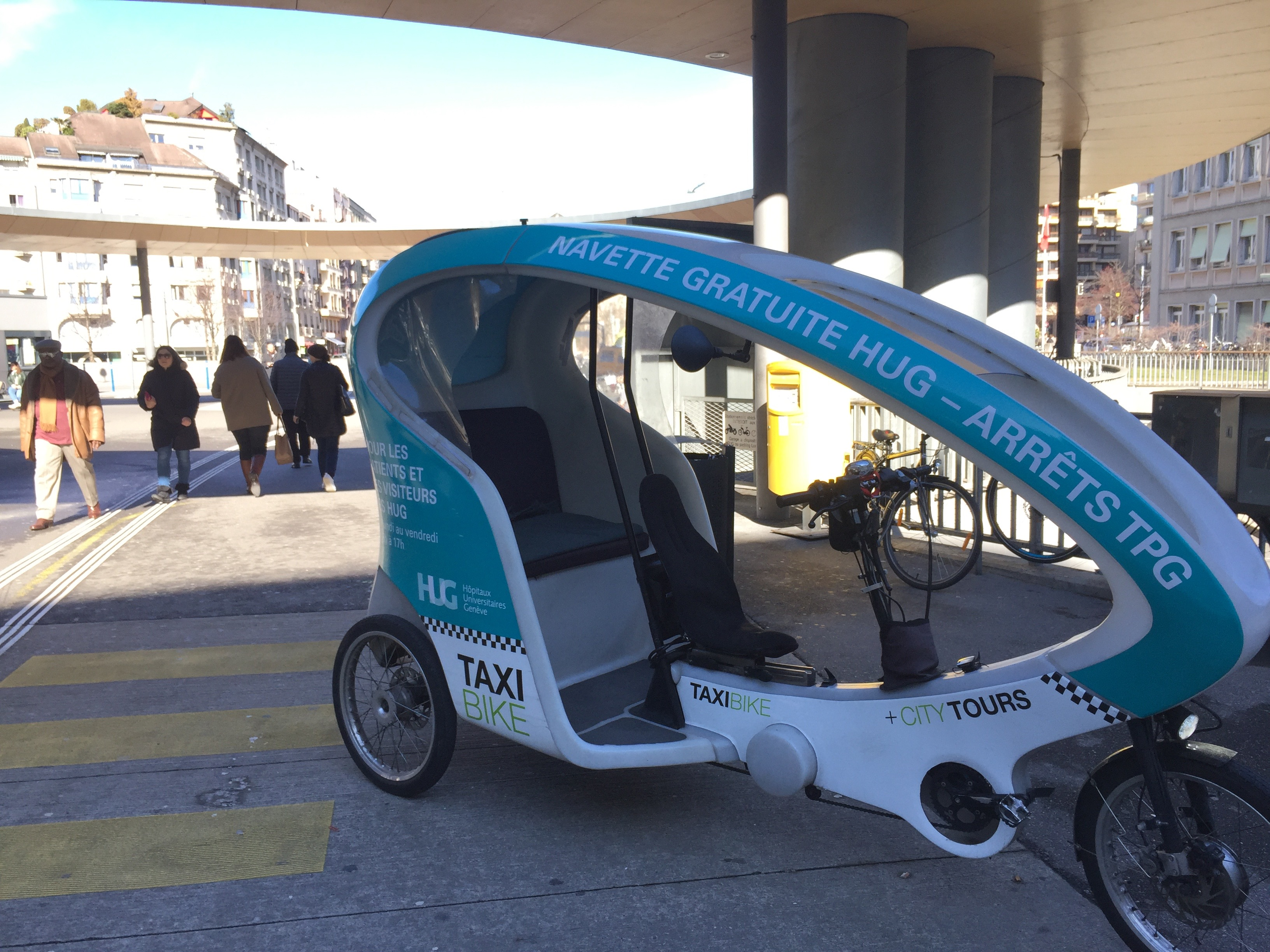
Shuttle taxi-bike at HUG

== See also ==
- University of Geneva
- Plainpalais
