= Mat Collishaw =

English artist (born 1966)

Mat Collishaw FRPS
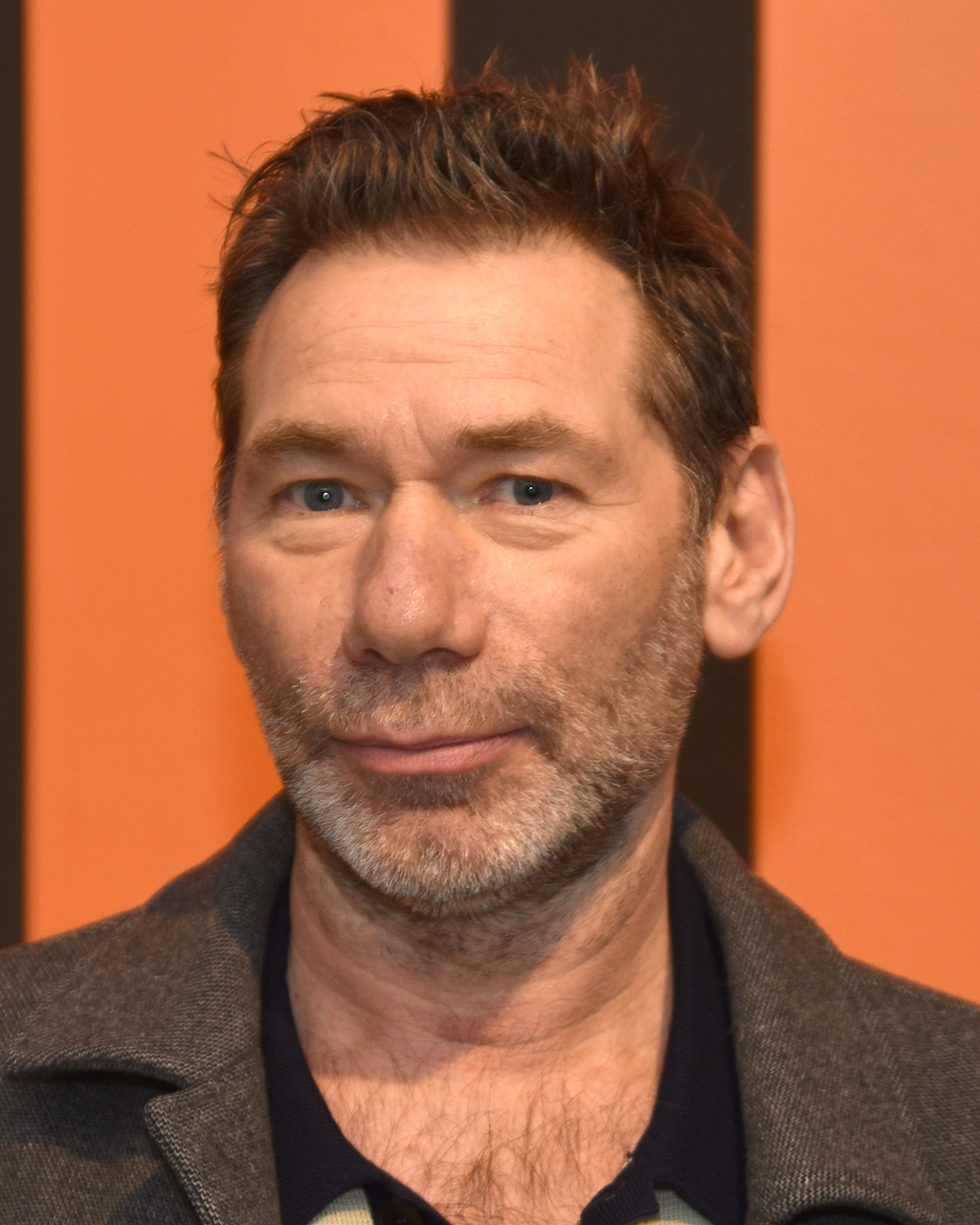
- Mat Collishaw in 2024
- Born: 6 January 1966 (age 60); Nottingham, England
- Known for: Installation, Sculpture, Photography
- Movement: Contemporary Art, Young British Artists
- Awards: Honorary Fellowship of the Royal Photographic Society

Matthew "Mat" Collishaw Hon. FRPS (born 6 January 1966) is a contemporary British artist based in London.

Bullet Hole which was on display in the Freeze exhibition.

== Work ==
Collishaw's work uses photography and video. With an early foundation at Goldsmiths College, Collishaw formed part of the legendary movement of Young British Artists (YBA's). He was one of 16 young artists who participated in the seminal Freeze exhibition organized by Damien Hirst in 1988, that launched the YBA, as well as the provocative Sensation show of 1997. His best known work is Bullet Hole (1988), which is a closeup photo of what appears to be a bullet hole wound in the scalp of a person's head, mounted on 15 light boxes. Collishaw took the original image from a pathology textbook that actually showed a wound caused by an ice pick. Bullet Hole was first exhibited in Freeze and is now in the collection of the Museum of Old and New Art in Hobart, Australia.

== Critical response ==
Jonathan Jones wrote in an interview with the artist in The Guardian of Collishaw's 2013 exhibition at Arter, Istanbul; 'A show that foregrounds his political conscience in powerful works such as Last Meal on Death Row. For me, Collishaw is a good political artist for the same reason he is a good religious artist and a good artist-artist. It is because he believes in the efficacy of images. Not for him the abstract evasion, the minimalist half smile... he wants to punch your imagination in the stomach. He justifies the art of sensation by showing how it can have depth in its oomph.'

Collishaw's artwork, All Things Fall, received a positive review from The Sunday Times art critic Waldemar Januszczak, who called it "... a remarkable re-creation of the Massacre of the Innocents, the biblical murder of every newborn boy ordered, at Christmas, by Herod. The sudden burst of unexpected violence is brilliantly paced, brilliantly achieved, in an artwork that is nothing less than a contemporary masterpiece."

The exhibition The Centrifugal Soul, at Blain|Southern Gallery, London in 2017 received praise from critic Gaby Wood, who wrote for The Telegraph, "... the fact that he can convert such abstract ideas into works that are elegant and entertaining makes him, uniquely among artists and thinkers so far this century, a cross between an aesthetic philosopher and a magician."

Collishaw's first venture into VR, with his exhibition Thresholds in 2017, was reviewed by Laurie Taylor for frieze Magazine: "Collishaw has not recreated an historical experience, but has instead constructed an entirely new one. The end product is ultimately Collishaw's vision and it teems with the reverence he has not only for the wonder of photography, but also for the power of its illusions."

== Influences ==
British pathologist, Austin Gresham, wrote a handbook, A Colour Atlas of Forensic Pathology, in 1975. Collishaw said it became "the Britart bible", as a source for explicit images of dead bodies for artwork.

== Personal life ==
Collishaw was born in Nottingham. He was raised in a Dawn Christadelphian family. In 2015, he was named one of GQ's 50 best dressed British men. Collishaw is married to Polly Morgan with whom he has two sons.

== Bibliography ==
- Mat Collishaw, Thomas Dane, Jon Thompson, Artimo Foundation Breda, 1997.
- Mat Collishaw, Neal Brown, Jason Beard, Other Criteria, London, 2007.
- Mat Collishaw: Insecticides, Nina Miall, Haunch of Venison, London, 2012.
- Mat Collishaw: Ou l'horreur délicieuse, Paul Ardenne, Régis Durand, Julie Gil, Federica Martini, Barbara Polla, Michele Robecchi, Le Bord de l'eau, Brussels, 2013
- Mat Collishaw, Sue Hubbard, Rachel Campbell-Johnson, Blain|Southern, London, 2013.
- Mat Collishaw: Afterimage, Başak Doğa Temür, Arter, Istanbul, 2013.
- Mat Collishaw: Black Mirror, Anna Coliva, Valentina Ciarallo and Andrew Graham-Dixon, Galleria Borghese, Rome, 2014.
- The Centrifugal Soul, Waldemar Januszczak, James Parry, Blain|Southern, London, 2017.
- Thresholds, Eşikler, Istanbul, 2018.
- Standing Water, Petr Nedoma, Galerie Rudolfinum, Prague, 2018.

== Awards ==
- 2018: Honorary Fellowship of the Royal Photographic Society (FRPS), Bath
