= Amsler =

Amsler is a surname. Notable people with the surname include:

- Guy Amsler (1895–1986), associate justice of the Arkansas Supreme Court
- Marc Amsler (1891–1968), Swiss ophthalmologist
  - Amsler grid
  - Amsler sign, a medical sign
- Margaret Harris Amsler (1908–2002), American lawyer and academic
- Marty Amsler (1942–2024), American football player
- Samuel Amsler (1791–1849), Swiss engraver

== See also ==
- Jakob Amsler-Laffon (1823–1912), Swiss mathematician, physicist and engineer
- Amsler Island, an island of the Palmer Archipelago, Antarctica
