= Archistorm =

French architecture, design and contemporary art magazine

Archistorm is a French architecture, design and contemporary art magazine based in Paris.

== History and profile ==
Founded by Marc Sautereau (Bookstorming) and Christophe Le Gac (Monografik, Stream) in June 2003, Archistorm is a magazine about architecture and contemporary art. The magazine has its headquarters in Paris. Christophe Le Gac was the first editor-in-chief and chose Jérôme Lefèvre as co-editor-in-chief. Notable art and architecture critics are still writers for Archistorm: Christophe Le Gac, Paul Ardenne, Stéphane Delage, Jérôme Lefèvre, Etienne Bernard, Juliette Soulez.

Michèle Leloup is the current editor-in-chief of Archistom.

== See also ==
- List of architecture magazines
