= Florian Verrey =

Swiss ophthalmologist

Florian Verrey (7 October 1911, in Lausanne – 14 September 1976) was a Swiss ophthalmologist.

He studied medicine at the University of Lausanne, and from 1939 served as an assistant under Marc Amsler at the university eye clinic. In 1944 he followed Amsler to the University of Zürich, where in 1951 he became head of its polyclinic. In 1960 he received a professorship in Zürich.

He was the author of 74 medical papers, many of which concerned the eye's aqueous humor. He was also interested in uveitis; in 1964 he listed 130 different diseases in which uveitis may happen. The eponymous "Amsler-Verrey sign" bears his name; being defined as bleeding caused by applanation tonometry and cataract surgery in patients with Fuchs heterochromic iridocyclitis.

== Selected writings ==
- Heterochromie de Fuchs et fragilite vasculaire, (with Marc Amsler, 1946) – Fuchs heterochromic iridocyclitis and vascular fragility.
- Clinique de l'humeur aqueuse pathologique, 1954 – Clinic on aqueous humor pathology.
- L'humeur aqueuse et ses fonctions, (with Marc Amsler and Alfred Huber, 1955) – Aqueous humor and its functions.
