= Amsler sign =

- Synonyms: Amsler–Verrey sign
- Purpose: Diagnosing Fuchs heterochromic iridocyclitis

Amsler sign also known as Amsler–Verrey sign is the name of the diagnostic finding seen in people with Fuchs heterochromic iridocyclitis (FHI). It is described as presence of blood (hyphema) in the aspirated aqueous fluid, in paracentesis of the anterior chamber, and is caused due to iris atrophy usually seen in FHI and exposure of the fragile iris vasculature to the aqueous fluid. The sudden change of pressure in the anterior chamber upon suction induced by the paracentesis, or during a cataract surgery, causes bursting of the fragile superficial iris capillaries resulting in micro-bleeding. This is one clinical diagnostic sign of FHI.

== History ==
This sign is named after the Swiss ophthalmologist Marc Amsler (15 February 1891 – 3 May 1968). It is sometimes referred to as Amsler–Verrey sign to acknowledge the contribution of another Swiss ophthalmologist, Florian Verrey (1911–1976).
