= Janet Biggs =

American artist

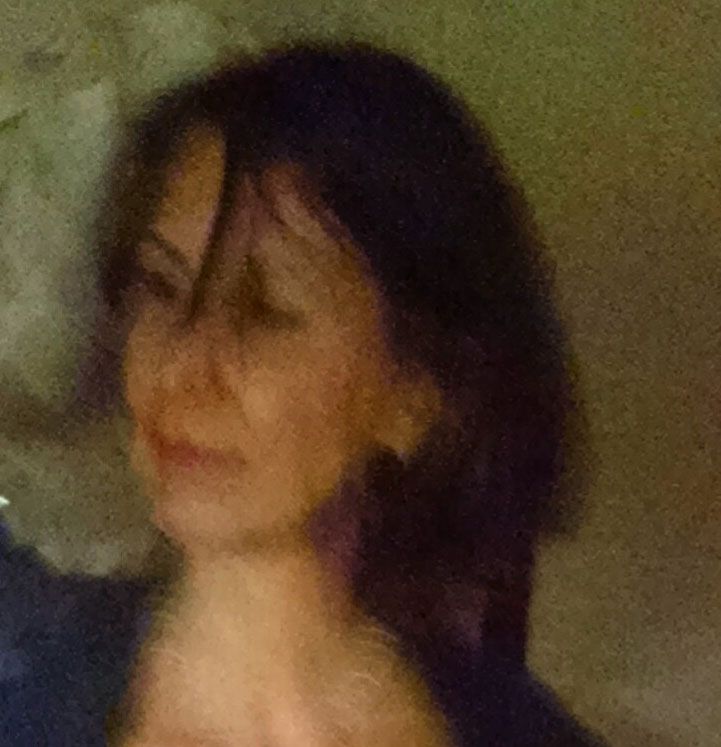
- Born: 1959 (age 66–67)
- Education: Moore College of Art and Design, Rhode Island School of Design
- Known for: Video Art, Photography, Performance Art
- Awards: John Simon Guggenheim Foundation
- Website: https://www.jbiggs.com/

Janet Biggs is an American visual artist, known for her work in video, photography and interdisciplinary performance art. Biggs lives and works in New York City. Biggs' work focuses on individuals in extreme landscapes or situations, such as the Taklamakan desert of Western China, the Horn of Africa, the Arctic, and the Mars Desert Research Station. Her work explores challenges faced by diverse groups including the Uighurs, Indonesian sulfur miners and Yemini refugees. In 2022, Biggs worked with CERN and the Spencer museum. Reviews of her work have appeared in the New York Times, the New Yorker, ArtForum, ARTNews, Art in America, Flash Art, and ArtReview. Biggs was awarded a Guggenheim Fellowship for Fine Arts in 2018.

== Recent works ==
From September 2024 to January 2025, Janet Biggs participated in the CyberArts Exhibit at the Torpedo Factory Art Center in Alexandria, Virginia. This exhibition, organized by the Commonwealth Cyber Initiative, explores the intersection of cybersecurity and art, and features Biggs’ work alongside other artists engaging with technology and digital culture.

In August, 2024, Biggs presented the video installation "Contra Naturam" at the ICEHOUSE Project Space in Sharon, Connecticut. This work, a collaboration with sight-impaired dancer Davian Robinson, is a three-channel video installation installed in a 10'x'10' icehouse. The piece, incorporating dancing by Robinson with images of ice boat racing, was created in response to Sharon native William F. Buckley's opinion that the blind should not be exposed to culture or nature.

Biggs' work was presented at the 2021 Armory Show, Javits Center, New York City, from 9–12 September 2021. Her work was shown at a solo booth as part of "Focus", curated by Wassan Al-Khudhairi.

In addition to videos, Biggs' work includes multi-discipline performances, using videos, live music, actors, and artificial intelligence. Her newest work incorporates footage shot by Biggs at refugee camps in Djibouti, in Ethiopian badlands, and at Mars simulations in Utah and the Himalayas. She has trained in space medicine, equestrian vaulting and arctic kayaking.

Beginning in 2020, Biggs, mathematician Agnieszka Międlar, and physicist Daniel Tapia Takaki, who leads the University of Kansas's (KU) team for the ALICE collaboration at CERN's Large Hadron Collider (LHC), collaborated on projects to explore questions in high energy physics, applying novel mathematical techniques to the production of video and performance. This group is a collaboration between Arts at CERN, the official arts program of the European Organization for Nuclear Research (CERN) and the Integrated Arts Research Initiative (IARI) at the Spencer Museum of Art. Their collaborative project was described in "How to Do Things with SVD: Mathematical Tool-Sharing from Physics to Performative Research," published in the journal Leonardo, published by MIT Press.

On April 8, 2021 Biggs presented a livestream performance, "Singular Value Decomposition," emerging from this collaboration.

This collaborative team went on to create an innovative video installation, titled "Collective Entanglements," which was presented at the Spencer Museum of Art at the University of Kansas (KU) in April, 2022. On 30 July 2020, Biggs created an experimental live online performance at Fridman Gallery in New York City. While Biggs directed remotely, singer and dancer Mary Esther Carter performed, accompanied by an Artificial intelligence entity named A.I. Anne, which was created by composer and music technologist Richard Savery. Also in July 2020, the Boca Raton Museum of Art presented a new installation by Biggs, "Solitary Acts."

In June 2019, Biggs presented 'Overview Effect', an exhibition of new video work, at the Cristin Tierney Gallery in New York City. As part of this exhibition, Biggs' premiered "How the Light Gets In," a multi-media performance, at the Theater at the New Museum.

In December, 2018, Biggs had solo exhibitions and film screenings at the Museo de la Naturaleza y el Hombre and the Museum of Science and the Cosmos in the Canary Islands. In May 2018, Biggs was included in "Shots Across the Plane," at the Zurab Tsereteli Museum of Modern Art in Tbilisi, Georgia.

In 2017, the Neuberger Museum of Art (Purchase, New York) presented "A Step on the Sun."

Biggs' work has been presented in shows at the Tasmanian Museum and Art Gallery (June, 2018), the 17º Festival Internacional de la Imagen (group exhibition as part of art + tech festival) in Manizales Colombia, "Art & Coal" (Kunst & Kohle), a group exhibition spanning 17 museums in the Ruhr Valley), at the Skulpturenmuseum Glaskasten Marl in Marl, Germany, "For a gentle song would not shake us if we had never heard a loud one" at the Fotografisk Center, Copenhagen, Denmark. and "Videos for a Stadium" at the University of Kentucky Art Museum (screening at the Commonwealth Stadium at University of Kentucky) Lexington, KY.

Biggs was selected to be on Crew 181 of the Mars Desert Research Station, and has incorporated elements of space exploration in several of her latest works.

== Exhibitions and screenings ==
Biggs has exhibited in solo shows and screenings at Cristin Tierney Gallery in New York City, Connersmith Gallery in Washington, DC, Barbara Polla's Analix Forever Gallery in Geneva, Smack Mellon in Brooklyn NY, and Galerie Anita Beckers in Frankfurt Germany.

In June 2017, at David Lynch's Club Silencio in Paris, Biggs presented her performance piece, "Far From Home," which incorporated a live musical performance by Rhys Chatham and a reading by Frank Smith with video of her work in a Yemeni refugee camp in Djibouti and at the Mars Desert Research Station.

In 2015, the Blaffer Art Museum in Houston, Texas, presented Biggs' Echo of the Unknown, a multidimensional exhibition combining video, sound, and objects that explore the role of memory in the construction of identity. In conjunction with Echo of the Unknown, Blaffer collaborated with more than a dozen UH colleges and Houston institutions on the Blaffer Art Museum Innovation Series, an ambitious slate of lectures, gallery talks and panel discussions, enhancing the exhibition's role as a catalyst for cross-disciplinary learning.

In 2014 Biggs was exhibited in the First International Biennial of Contemporary Art of Cartagena de Indias.

The Tampa Museum of Art presented a survey of Biggs' work in 2011. Biggs' video work has also been shown in solo exhibitions at Musée d'art contemporain de Montréal, Glaskasten Marl Sculpture Museum (Marl, Germany), the Mint Museum (Charlotte NC), the Gibbes Museum of Art (Charlotte, NC), the McNay Museum (San Antonio, Texas), the Herbert F. Johnson Museum of Art (Ithaca, NY), Videonale 13 (Bonn, Germany) and the Perth Institute of Contemporary Arts. In 2012, Biggs' Arctic Trilogy was screened as part of the Environmental Film Festival at the Hirshhorn Museum and Sculpture Garden (Washington, DC).

Biggs travelled to the far Arctic in 2009-2010, where she captured images of individuals' interaction with extremes environments above and below the ice. Biggs used this footage to create three videos, "The Arctic Trilogy." These videos were premiered at Ed Winkleman Gallery in Chelsea (New York City) in February 2011. This show was reviewed in the New York Times by Holland Carter.

On July 14, 2009, Vanishing Point was screened at New York's River To River Festival. That same evening, Biggs' videos accompanied an ambient performance by Anthony Gonzalez of the band M83.

== Recognition ==
Biggs was awarded a Guggenheim Fellowship for Fine Arts in 2018.

In 2016, Biggs was selected by Lynn Hershman Leeson as part of ArtReview magazine's "Future Greats - the artists to look out for in 2016." Also in 2016, Biggs was named a Distinguished Alumni at Moore College of Art and Design.

The October 2015 Art In America featured an article written by Faye Hirsch on Biggs' work, with a focus on the Blaffer exhibition.

ArtNew's April 2015 cover article "Art Made in Harm's Way" by Lily Wei featured Biggs' travels to Ethiopia's border conflict, where she filmed local Afar militia as they patrolled the Ethiopian/Eritrean border.

In 2013 Biggs was awarded a la Napoule Art Foundation Riviera Residency, and in 2009 and 2010 she was selected for The Arctic Circle High Arctic Expedition residency. She received an Art Matters Project grant in 2010. Janet Biggs was a recipient of a New York State Council on the Arts grant in 2011 and 2009 through the New York Experimental Television Center. She has received additional funding grants from the Arts and Science Council of Charlotte and the Goodrich Foundation. In 2004 she received the Anonymous Was a Woman fellowship, and received a painting fellowship from the National Endowment for the Arts in 1989.

Contemporary Magazine profiled Biggs in their March 2007 issue.

== Commercial work ==
Biggs was commissioned by Puma to create a short film as part of their 2012 Films4Peace initiative.

In 2006, Hermès commissioned Biggs to create a work of art for their flagship New York store. Biggs installed 11 large monitors in the store's Madison Avenue windows, as well as photographs of equestrian-themed images.

== Representation ==
Biggs works with Cristin Tierney Gallery, New York City, Hyphen-Hub, New York City, CONNERSMITH (Washington, DC), Analix Forever (Geneva, Switzerland), and Galerie Anita Beckers/blink video (Frankfurt, Germany).
