= Barbara Polla =

Swiss doctor and writer (born 1951)

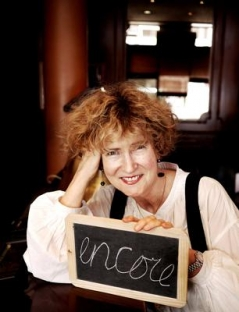
- Born: March 7, 1950
- Occupations: Medical doctor, gallery owner, art curator, writer

Barbara Polla (born March 7, 1950) is a Swiss medical doctor, gallery owner, art curator and writer.

== Biography ==
Daughter of the painter AMI (Anne-Marie Imhoof) and of a passionate philhellene (Rodolphe Imhoof), Barbara Polla grew up in Geneva and spent a year in Greece at the age of 17. This year spent abroad represented her first contact with a dictatorship and prison. She has four children and was divorced in 2013.

Barbara Polla studied in Geneva where she obtained a degree with a specialization in inner medicine, pneumology and immunoallergology. She then conducted research at Harvard Medical School (HMS), Massachusetts General Hospital (MGH) in Boston. In 1989, she took the helm of the unit of study of allergies at the Cantonal Hospital in Geneva. From 1993 to 2000, she worked as research director of the French Institute of Health and Medical Research in Paris, focusing on stress proteins (HSP) and oxygen free radicals. She is the author and co-author of hundreds of research articles published in various reviews such as Proceedings of the National Academy of Sciences USA, The Journal of Clinical Investigation, and The American Journal of Physiology. In 1991, Polla got involved in politics: first as member of the Geneva City Council, then as canton depute of Geneva from 1993 to 1999 and finally as member of the National Parliament from 1999 to 2003. She left the Liberal Party of Geneva in 2007.

Since 1991, she has been developing her activity of gallery owner in Geneva. International program dedicated to contemporary artists, interest in every field that art explores and in every artistic media, multiple collaborations with art critics and curators, many publications, are some of the characteristics of Analix Forever. Polla has been curating exhibitions in Paris and elsewhere since 2011. In 2008, Polla initiated a long-term collaboration with Paul Ardenne (exhibitions, conferences, books). She was associate curator for the exhibition "Motopoetics" (MAC Lyon, 2014) and for "Human Economy" presented at HEC Paris (2014, 2015). In 2015, Polla and Paul Ardenne were the co-curators of a two-part exhibition of Shaun Gladwell across two sites in Sydney: UNSW Galleries and SCAF (Sherman Contemporary Art Foundation).

She teaches on the links between art and fashion at the Institut Français de la Mode (IFM) in Paris and at the HEAD (Haute Ecole d'art et de Design) in Geneva. She organizes monthly seminars in Geneva on the theme of creativity and is also a creative and critical writing professor at the HEAD. Polla is a writer and a columnist for newspapers such as Les Quotidiennes (La Tribune de Genève, 24 heures), Agefi, (Switzerland), Citizen K, Nuke, Blast, Bariqaldana (Kuwait), CRASH, DROME, ART And, Roots & Routes, and Kunst Magazine. Since 2020 she is regularly writing for Womentoday.fr She cofounded and edited the magazine Londerzeel and has created, in 2013, with the support of HEAD Geneva, the first issue of Critical Fashion Review. She also founded the Swiss Organization for emotional architecture and is the originator of the first international conference about emotional Architecture that took place in January 2011 in Geneva. Polla commits herself to freedom at various levels: as national counsellor, she fought for freedom of research, for the right to abort and to the pre-implantation diagnosis. The final voting about this subject occurred in Switzerland on June 14, 2015.

Since 2017, Barbara Polla had worked on a cultural, artistic and social project aiming to install art by the UK artist Robert Montgomery in the public space of Perama, a city near Athens in Greece where she lived as a teenager. The project also includes a pedagogic program with scholars from Perama, a collaboration with the Athens School of Fine Arts, films, publications and theater plays to be presented in the open air Mikis Theodorakis Theater of Perama.

== Politics ==
In 1991 Polla got involved in politics, first as member of the Geneva City Council, and then as canton of Geneva deputy from 1993 to 1999 and member of the national parliament from 1999 to 2003. During her tenure as politicians she stood up for the freedom of research, preimplantatory diagnosis and the legalisation of abortion. She left the Liberal Party of Geneva in 2007.

== Art and prison ==
She has been co-curator of many exhibitions on the theme "Art & Prison". The first one, entitled Public Enemy was organized at Magda Danysz Gallery in 2013; the next one at the contemporary art centre le Château des Adhémar in Montélimar, La Belle Echappée; in March 2015, La Belle Echappée, was shown at ISBA (Beaux Arts Institute of Besançon). The same evolving show, Le Sens de la Peine was also presented in Nanterre in a contemporary art exhibition space called the Terrasse, in collaboration with Sandrine Moreau.

In 2018, Polla curated two museum exhibitions on the theme, one at Château de Penthes in Geneva called LA PRISON EXPOSÉ, for the Fondation des Suisses dans le Monde, in collaboration with the local jail, Champ-Dollon; the other at the Tasmanian Museum and Art Gallery, in Hobart Tasmania, called A JOURNEY TO FREEDOM.

== Art video ==
Polla organizes bimonthly conferences dedicated to video art: VIDEO FOREVER taking place in different sites: Magda Danysz Gallery, Palais de Tokyo, Musée de la Chasse et de la Nature, Frank Perrin studio, National Finish Theatre of Helsinki and UNSW Galleries in Sydney. Barbara Polla regularly publishes articles about video on the online magazine art-critique.

== Bibliography ==
=== Publications ===
- Asthme et allergie, Ed. Médecine et Hygiène, Geneva, 1993
- Incertaine identité, with Olivier Zahm, Luigi L. Polla, Ed. Georg, 1994
- Stress-inducible cellular responses, with Feige U. Morimoto RI. Yahara I., Ed. BirkhäuserVerlag (Basel, Boston, Berlin), 1996
- L'inflammation, avec Russo-Marie F. Pelletier A., Médecine/Sciences, Ed. John Libbey, 1998
- Étreinte, Ed. de l'Aire, 2003
- La Nécessité libérale 2-88108-644-6, Ed. de l'Aire, 2003
- Vocation créateurs, with Pascal Perez, 2004
- Les hommes, ce qui les rend beaux, Ed. Favre, 2005
- Handicap entre différence et ressemblance, Ed. Favre, 2007
- Andrea Mastrovito | Tigres de papier, with Andrea Bruciati, Paolo Colombo, Joseph del Pesco, Paul Ardenne, Ed. monografik, 2008
- Working Men, le travail dans l'art contemporain, with Paul Ardenne, Ed. Que, 2008
- A toi bien sûr, Ed. l'Âge d'Homme, 2008
- Kris Van Assche, Amor o muerte, Ed. L'Âge d'Homme, 2009
- Victoire, Ed. l'Âge d'Homme, 2009
- Peintures. Please pay attention please, with Paul Ardenne, Ed. La Muette, 2010
- Architecture Émotionnelle, Matière à penser, Collectif under the supervision of Paul Ardenne and Barbara Polla, Ed. La Muette, 2011
- Jacques Coulais Pictor Maximus, avec Paul Ardenne, Ed. Take5, 2011
- Tout à fait femme, Odile Jacob, 2012
- Noir Clair dans tout l'univers, Collectif under the supervision of Barbara Polla, Ed. La Muette, 2012
- IN IT, Ali Kazma - Paul Ardenne, Barbara Polla, Managing editor, 2012
- L'Ennemi public, Collectif under the supervision of Barbara Polla, Paul Ardenne & Magda Danysz, Ed. La Muette, 2013
- Mat Collishaw ou l'horreur délicieuse, Under the supervision of Barbara Polla, Ed. La Muette, 2013
- Tout à fait homme, Odile Jacob, 2014
- Troisième Vie, Eclectica, 2015
- Vingt-cinq os plus l'astragale, Art&fiction, 2016
- Eloge de l'érection, Barbara Polla, Dimitris Dimitriadis, ed. La Muette, 2016
- Femmes hors normes, Odile Jacob, 2017
- IVORY HONEY, New River Press, 2018 ISBN 9781999631000
- Le Nouveau Féminisme, Combats et rêves de l'ère post-Weinstein, Odile Jacob, 2019
- Moi, la grue, Barbara Polla et Julien Serve, ed. Plaine page, 2019
- Paul-pris-dans-l’écriture, Barbara Polla, preface by Bruno Wajskop, illustrations by Julien Serve, La Muette Le Bord de L’eau, 2020 ISBN 9782356877376
- Traversée d'amour, Barbara Polla, in: Traversée, Collectif, editorial direction Nathalie Guiot, Ed. Ishtar, 2020
- ÉQUINOXE, Souvenirs d’un printemps confiné, Collectif poétique sous la direction de Barbara Polla, Pan des Muses - Éditions de la SIÉFÉGP, 2020
- HORIZONS VÉRONIQUE CAYE, Paul Ardenne et Barbara Polla, Hématomes éditions, 2021. (ISBN 978-2-9602558-3-6)
- L'art est une fête, Barbara Polla, Julien Serve, Editions Slatkine, 2021

=== Catalogues ===
- Ghosting, mounir fatmi, Studio Fatmi Publishing, Oct. 2011. Texts by Thierry Raspail, Lillian Davies, Michèle Cohen Hadria, Thomas Boutoux, Barbara Polla
- Ali Kazma, C24 Gallery, 2012 ISBN 978-0-615-71553-7
- The Kissing Precise, Ed. La Muette, 2013. Texts by Barbara Polla, Régis Durand & mounir fatmi
- The Lacrima Chair, Shaun Gladwell, Sherman Contemporary Art Foundation, 2015 ISBN 978-0-9874909-3-3
- Echo of the Unknown, Janet Biggs, Blaffer Art Museum, 2015. Texts by Janet Phelps, Barbara Polla & Jean-Philippe Rossignol
- Robert Montgomery, Ed Distanz, 2015. ISBN 978-3-95476-077-0
- Body Membory, Topographie de l'Art, 2015 ISBN 978-2-36669-018-7
- "GED" 10 YEARS AT BAKSI, Baksi Museum, Baksı Kültür Sanat Vakfı, 2016. ISBN 978-975-98236-9-6
- Direction artistique, Barbara Polla, Magda Danysz, 2016
- Love Stories, Editions Diaphanes, 2016
- WARNING SHOT, Topographie de l'Art, la Manufacture de l'Image, 2016
- DANCE WITH ME VIDEO, Maison Européenne de la Photographie, 2017
- SOUTERRAIN, Ali Kazma, Jeu de Paume, 2017
- HARD CORE, Abdul Rahman Katanani, Le Fil de la Douleur, Editions Barbara Polla, 2017
- MARTIAL, Martial Cherrier, Editions Contrasto / Maison Européenne de la Photographie, 2017
- C'EST ENCORE LA NUIT, mounir fatmi, Kara mon amour, SFpublishing, 2018
- DES FORCES, Rachel Labastie, (Self)portrait of the artist as a young woman, La Muette, 2018
- "Where I come from and where I belong", in Yapci Ramos, Show Me, Centro Atlántico de Arte Moderno, 2019, pp. 113–122
- SKETCHPAD, Quand nos enfants seront adultes, Topographie de l'Art, la Manufacture de l'Image, 2019, with Nicolas Etchenagucia

=== Poetry ===
- SMEAR / POEMS FOR GIRLS, edited by Greta Bellamacina, New River Press, 2016: In the Rain & Hydrangea, Barbara Polla ISBN 9780995480766
- 101 LIVRES-ARDOISES, composé par Wanda Mihuleac, Les Éditions Transignum, 2017: You & Me, Barbara Polla
- CURIOSITÉS CONTEMPORAINES, Numéro Spécial de Point Contemporain, 2018: No one may ever have sex again, Barbara Polla
- WHEN THEY START TO LOVE YOU AS A MACHINE YOU SHOULD RUN, New River Press Yearbook, 2019: Just Before Love, Barbara Polla ISBN 9781999631048
- HOMMAGE À LÉONARD et à la Renaissance, Exhibition catalogue, Château du Rivau, 2019
- ÉQUINOXES, LE CERCLE DES POETES APPARU.E.S, Collectif, editorial direction Nathalie Guiot and Barbara Polla, Ed. Ishtar, 2020: TEEN & Le cercle des poètes apparu.e.s, Barbara Polla ISBN 978-2-931104-02-6
- SMEAR / POEMS FOR GIRLS, editorial direction Greta Bellamacina, Andrews McMeel Publishing, 2020: The night my mother died, Barbara Polla ISBN 9781524854089
- ÉQUINOXE, Souvenirs d’un printemps confiné, Collectif poétique sous la direction de Barbara Polla, Pan des Muses - Éditions de la SIÉFÉGP, 2020 ISSN 2492-0487
