= Fuchs heterochromic iridocyclitis =

- Specialty: Ophthalmology

Fuchs heterochromic iridocyclitis (FHI) is a chronic unilateral uveitis appearing with the triad of heterochromia, predisposition to cataract and glaucoma, and keratitis precipitates on the posterior corneal surface. Patients are often asymptomatic and the disease is often discovered through investigation of the cause of the heterochromia or cataract. Neovascularisation (growth of new abnormal vessels) is possible and any eye surgery, such as cataract surgery, can cause bleeding from the fragile vessels in the atrophic iris causing accumulation of blood in the anterior chamber of the eye, also known as hyphema.

== Presentation ==
This condition is usually unilateral, and its symptoms vary from none to mild blurring and discomfort. Signs include diffuse iris atrophy and small white keratic precipitates (deposits on the inner surface of the cornea), cells presenting in the anterior chamber as well as the anterior vitreous. Glaucoma and cataract occur frequently.

=== Complications ===
Complications are as follows:

- Glaucoma
- Cataract
- Decreased visual acuity (vision loss)
- Iris atrophy

== Causes ==
According to recent research, no single theory is able to explain the cause fully. However current plausible theories include infection with Toxoplasma gondii, Herpes simplex virus, Rubella, neurogenic causes, and autoimmune pathology.

== Diagnosis ==
Diagnosis is made by an ophthalmologist or optometrist based on the clinical presentation. One indication can be the Amsler sign, which is the presence of blood (hyphema) in the aspirated vitreous fluid, in paracentesis of the anterior chamber. This is caused due to iris atrophy usually seen in FHI and exposure of the fragile iris vasculature to the vitreous fluid. The sudden change of pressure in the anterior chamber upon suction induced by the paracentesis, or during cataract surgery, causes bursting of the fragile superficial iris capillaries resulting in micro-bleeding. This is one clinical diagnostic sign of FHI slit-lamp examination shows stringy keratic precipitates

== Treatment ==
Patients usually do not require treatment due to the benign nature of the disease. In case a cataract develops, patients generally do well with cataract surgery.

== History ==
First described using available patient presentations observed, by an Austrian ophthalmologist, Ernst Fuchs in 1906.
