= Adolphe Franceschetti =

Swiss ophthalmologist (1896–1968)

Adolphe Franceschetti (11 October 1896, in Zürich – 3 March 1968, in Geneva) was a Swiss ophthalmologist.

He studied medicine at the University of Zürich, where he also spent several years as an assistant in its ophthalmological clinic. At Zurich, his influences were Otto Haab and Alfred Vogt. Later on, he relocated to the University of Basel as an assistant under Arthur Brückner at the eye clinic. In 1931 he obtained his habilitation at Basel, and from 1933 to 1966 was a professor and director of the university eye clinic in Geneva. In 1948 he established a department of human genetics, with ophthalmologist David Klein serving as its head.

He was the author of around 500 scientific articles, many of them involving human genetics and inheritable diseases of the eye. His name is associated with several medical syndromes; notably, Naegeli–Franceschetti–Jadassohn syndrome, Franceschetti–Zwahlen–Klein syndrome and Franceschetti–Klein–Wildervanck syndrome. He is also credited with introducing improved techniques to keratoplastic surgery.

== Selected works ==
- Beitrag zur Kenntnis der evulsio nervi optici, 1923 – On optic nerve avulsion.
- Lehrbuch der Augenheilkunde (with Arthur Brückner, Marc Amsler, Jean Babel; 3rd edition 1961) – Textbook of ophthalmology.
- Genetics and ophthalmology (with Petrus Johannes Waardenburg, David Klein; 2 volumes 1961–63).
- Chorioretinal heredodegenerations, 1974; in English, a translated update of Les hérédo-dégénérescences chorirétiniennes.
