= Bullet Hole =

1988 artwork by British artist Mat Collishaw

Mat Collishaw Bullet Hole, 1988

Bullet Hole is the title of a 1988 artwork by British artist Mat Collishaw. Despite the title, the work is a reproduction of an ice pick wound to the head, appropriated from a pathology manual and blown up over an interlocking grid of fifteen separate framed images that make up one single work. It first went on show in the exhibition Freeze, organized by Damien Hirst.

The work has become synonymous with the perceived ethos of the Young British Artists art scene, in particular the reuse of imagery that is seemingly repulsive or shocking.

The photographs were described by Ian Jeffrey, in a catalogue essay for the Freeze exhibition as a "freeze-frame" and hence prompted the title of that exhibition.

According to Collishaw, the artwork did not sell and “rotted in a skip” outside the Freeze exhibition in 1988.
