= Emil Krückmann =

German ophthalmologist (1865–1944)

Emil Paul Ernst Olaf Friedrich Krückmann (14 May 1865, in Neukloster – 23 June 1944, in Berlin) was a German ophthalmologist.

He studied medicine at several German universities, receiving his doctorate from the University of Göttingen in 1890. From 1891 to 1894 he was an assistant at the university eye clinic in Rostock and in 1896 he obtained his habilitation for ophthalmology. In 1901 he became an associate professor at the University of Leipzig, and he later served as a full professor at the universities of Königsberg (1907–12) and Berlin (1912-38).

In 1916 he co-founded the Deutsche Blindenstudienanstalt (German Institute for the Blind). Today, the Emil-Krückmann-Bücherei (a library for the blind) in Marburg commemorates his name.

== Selected writings ==
- Ueber Fremdkörpertuberculose und Fremd-körperriesenzellen, 1894 – On tuberculous foreign bodies and foreign giant cells.
- Ueber die Sensibilität der Hornhaut, 1895 – On the sensitivity of the cornea.
- Ueber eine Meningoencephalocele des Augapfels, 1898 – On a meningoencephalocele of the eyeball.
- Eine weitere Mittheilung zur Pathogenese der sogenannten Stauungspapille, 1898 – Pathogenesis of the so-called papilledema.
- Physiologisches über die Pigmentepithelzellen der Retina, 1899 – The physiology involving pigment epithelial cells of the retina.
- Die Syphilis der Regenbogenhaut: nach Beobachtungen aus der Sattler’schen Augenklinik, 1906 – Syphilis of the iris: according to observations at Hubert Sattler's ophthalmological clinic.
- Die Erkrankungen des Uvealtractus und des Glaskörpers, 1908 – Diseases of the uveal tract and vitreous humor.
- Über Schießbrillen (with Berthold von Kern), 1914.
- Über Kriegsblindenfürsorge, Leipzig, 1915 – War-related blindness.
- Grundriss der Augenheilkunde für Studierende und praktische Ärzte (second edition, 1929) – Outline of ophthalmology.
