= Marc Amsler =

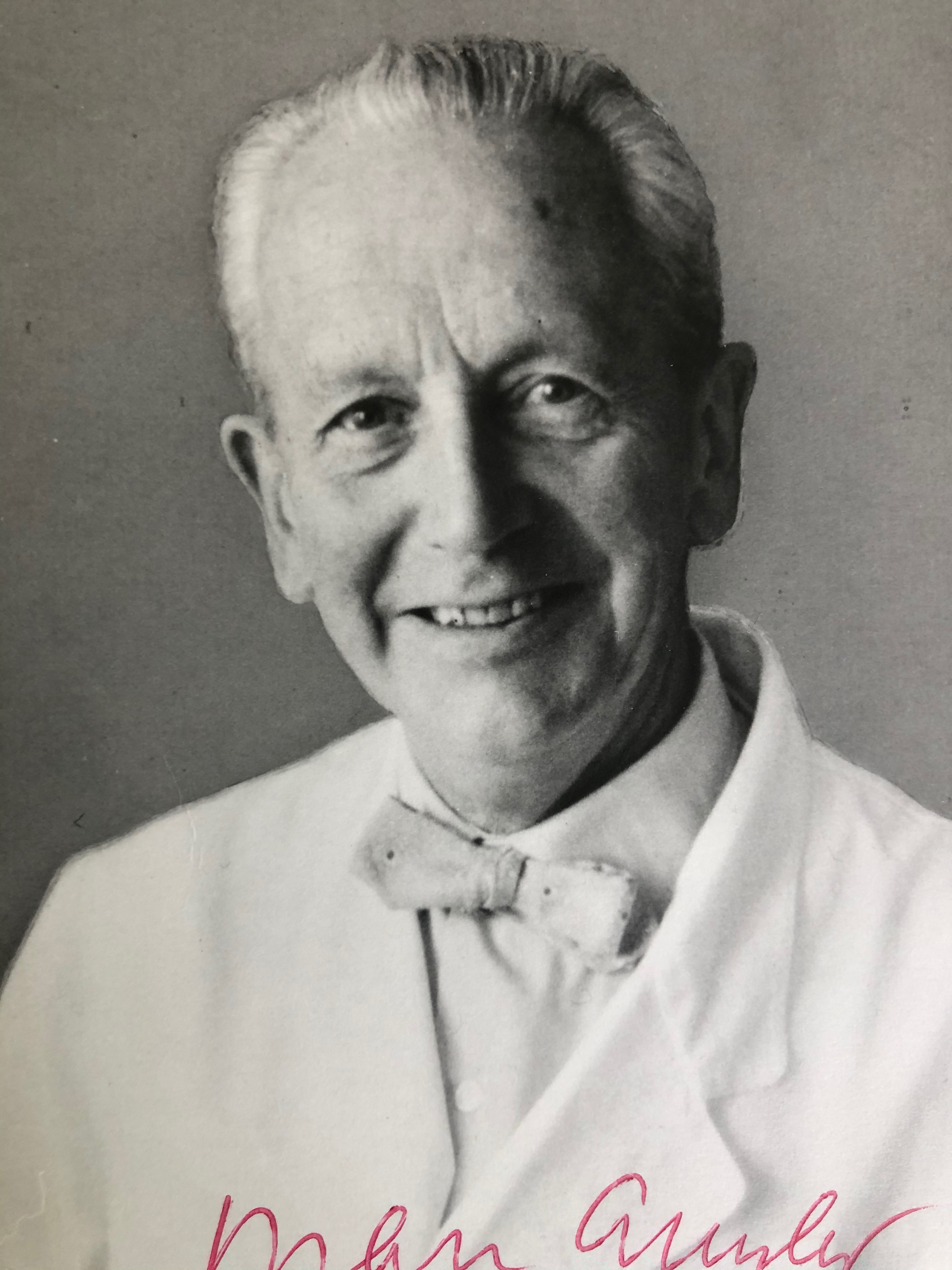
Marc Amsler

Marc Amsler (born 5 February 1891 in Vevey, Switzerland – died 3 May 1968) was a professor of ophthalmology in the Eye Clinic at the University of Zurich.

He took the position as professor of ophthalmology in Zurich in 1944. His predecessor was Prof. Alfred Vogt. Prior to assuming the position at Zurich, Dr. Amsler was chief ophthalmologist in Lausanne, since 1935. His predecessor there, under whom he worked beforehand, was Jules Gonin. During his time in Lausanne, Amsler was instrumental in creating the Jules Gonin Medal which is awarded every four years and is considered the highest honor in ophthalmology. Amsler was professor and chief of the Zurich Eye Clinic until 1961. His successor was Rudolf Witmer.

He is best known for the Amsler grid test. The Amsler grid was an improvement over the initial work done by the ophthalmologist Edmond Landolt. The grid tests the function of the macula, a part of the retina, and enables patients to self-test for and monitor metamorphopsia, a symptom of early stages of macular degeneration.

He also contributed to the progress in the understanding of uveitis. Furthermore, he published works on keratoconus. In 1951, Amsler performed the first corneal transplantation at the Zurich Eye Clinic.

== Selected works ==
- Le keratocone fruste au Javal. Ophthalmologica, Basel, 1938, 96: 77–83.
- Heterochromie de Fuchs et fragilite vasculaire (with Florian Verrey). Ophthalmologica, Basel, 1946, 111: 177.
- Lehrbuch der Augenheilkunde. Basel, Karger, 1948. 858 pages. M. Amsler, A. Bruckner, Adolphe Franceschetti, Hans Goldmann u. Enrico Bernardo Streiff, editors: New edition 1954, 927 pages. Third edition, Basel, Freiburg im Breisgau, New York : Karger, 1961. 1011 pages.
- Quantitative and qualitative vision. Transactions of the Ophthalmological Society of the United Kingdom, London, 1949, 69: 397–410.
- Mydriase et myose directes et instantanées par les médiateurs chimiques. with Florian Verrey. Annales d'oculistique, Paris, December 1949, 182 (12): 936.
- Earliest symptoms of diseases of the macula. The British Journal of Ophthalmology, London, 1953, 37: 521–537.
- L'Humeur Aqueuse et ses Fonctions (with Florian Verrey and Alfred Huber). Paris, Masson, 1955.
