= Ömer Ali Kazma =

Turkish video artist (born 1971)

Ali Kazma
- Born: 1971 (age 54–55); Istanbul
- Occupation: Video artist
- Awards: Nam June Paik Award and UNESCO Award for the Promotion of the Arts

Ali Kazma (born 1971) is a Turkish video artist, best known for his series documenting human activity, and labor that explores the meaning of production and social organisation.

== Early life and education ==
Kazma was born in Istanbul, Turkey, and graduated from Robert College in 1989. After briefly studying photography in London, he returned to the US to study film. He received his MA from The New School in New York City where he worked as a teaching assistant.

Kazma has been living in Istanbul since 2000.

== Selected works and projects ==
Kazma's videos raise fundamental questions about the meaning and significance of human activity and labor and the meaning of economy, production, and social organisation. He has exhibited his work in the Istanbul Bienniall (2001, 2007, 2011), Tokyo Opera City (2001), Platform Garanti Contemporary Art Centre (Istanbul, 2004), Istanbul Modern (2004), 9th Havana Biennial (2006), San Francisco Art Institute (2006), Lyon Biennial (2007), Sao Paulo Biennial (2012) among others.

Ali Kazma was granted the 2001 UNESCO Award for the Promotion of the Arts and received the 2010 Nam June Paik Award given by North Rhine-Westphalia Art Foundation in the field of media art, with his “Obstructions” series that he had been working on since 2005.

Living and working in Istanbul as a video artist since 1998 and becoming internationally established from 2007, Ali Kazma creates sets of short films that are usually between ten and twelve minutes long. In his multi-video formats, Kazma creates archives of the human condition through his fascination with man and the nature of life and death. In presenting the audience with conflicting notions of human nature, as well as our spatial relationship with our body and our physical surroundings, we are shown the complexities within these topics. Kazma is represented by Galeri Nev Istanbul.

=== Obstructions ===
In the video series he has been producing since 2005 under the heading of Obstructions, Ali Kazma has carried out research into the tense equilibrium between order and chaos, and life and death, into the efforts of the human being to hold together a world inclined towards disintegration and destruction, and the diversity of physical production developed to achieve this, and what such production might mean in the context of human nature.

The Obstructions series was instigated by a 37-day performative work Ali Kazma realized for Istanbul Pedestrian Exhibitions II: Tünel-Karaköy, an exhibition co-curated for public space by Fulya Erdemci and Emre Baykal in 2005. In this work titled Today, Kazma had tracked down micro-level production and repair activities within the daily life of the neighbourhood where the exhibition took place. He first recorded and edited these activities with his camera during the day and later projected them onto a shop window facing Tünel Square in the evening on the same day. After the working hours ended and the time for rest arrived, the shift of Kazma’s work started, conveying the events of the day into the night throughout the exhibition period. Employing a small shift in time as its presentation strategy, this performative work articulated the artist’s own physical and mental labour as part of the daily routine of the neighbourhood and rendered visible in fragments all kinds of production, maintenance and repair activities that we often pass by without paying any attention –or do not see at all, because they are carried out indoors. Today brought, into its own field of research, the human body at work in the broadest sense of the word, the tools that function as the extensions of the body, the common gestures and acts of working bodies, and the grammar of its language formed via similarities between these gestures and acts.

The Obstructions series, presently comprising 16 works, was triggered by the idea of revisiting the fragments that made up Today stripped of their urban/spatial context; and expanded by incorporating other categories of production that were not included in Today. The majority of works in the Obstruction series have a focus on the effort human beings exert for the continuity, comfort, measurement, control, maintenance, repair etc. of the body. The field of execution, or the final product of such activities could either be a material object that supports or supplements the body (Jean Factory, Rolling Mills, Clock Master, Cuisine), while at other times the body becomes the site of performance (Dancer, Painter), or operation itself (Brain Surgeon).

=== Resistance ===
Kazma's Resistance series grows out from within the Obstructions series; and explores how the body is shaped today via scientific, cultural and social tools and how as a performance site it is repeatedly re-produced. In other words, Resistance conveys the productive activity of the body as a creative force directly onto the body itself; the producer and the produced, the shaper and the shaped this time unite in the materiality of the body.

The effort to resist, implied in the title of this series, references the fundamental scientific truth that everything must eventually disintegrate, and perish. Ali Kazma’s Obstructions point towards the sum of production and repair activities as the human being’s endless effort against this absolute process of annihilation –and ultimately death– in order to at least decelerate and delay this process. In Resistance, Ali Kazma explores the discourses, techniques and management tactics developed for the body today and focuses on the interventions and strategies that both release the body from its own restrictions and restrict it in order to control it. He attempts to understand the changes the body undergoes not only via the subjects before his camera, but also via the spaces that stage the reconstruction of the subject. The metaphorical perception which since Ancient Greece sees the body as the coffin, cage, or cell that confines the mind or the spirit takes “Resistance” into spaces where bodies are controlled, disciplined and restricted –yet almost no body is seen within the architectural confines recorded by Ali Kazma.

Resistance provides important clues regarding the direction Ali Kazma’s artistic production is likely to evolve as it promises to expand in time in order to include within its scope the infinite knowledge that counts the body as its source, both as a real and restricted image, and as a field of infinite possibilities.

=== Venice Biennial ===
Ali Kazma represented Turkey in the 55th International Art Exhibition, la Biennale di Venezia. Curated by Emre Baykal, the Pavilion of Turkey at the 55th Venice Biennial featured Ali Kazma’s video series Resistance.

In Resistance, Ali Kazma explores the discourses, techniques and management tactics developed for the body today and focuses on the interventions and strategies that both release the body from its own restrictions and restrict it in order to control it.

Kazma attempts to read the complex meanings and the enigma produced by the body as a physical and conceptual space from within a broad network of relations. Amongst the various settings of Resistance are a film set in Paris, a prison in Sakarya, a school and a hospital operating room in Istanbul, a university where robot production and experimental research is carried out in Berlin, a medical research laboratory in Lausanne, a tattoo studio in London, and a theatre hall in New York.
