= Arthur Brückner =

Arthur Brückner (24 August 1877, in Dorpat – 29 March 1975, in Basel) was a German-Swiss ophthalmologist, known for his research in sensory physiology and his studies involving the cytology of the eye.

He studied medicine at several German universities, receiving his doctorate in 1904. After graduation, he worked as an assistant to physiologist Ewald Hering at Leipzig University and ophthalmologist Carl von Hess at the University of Würzburg. In 1910 he became an associate professor of ophthalmology at the University of Königsberg, and two years later moved to Berlin, where he worked closely with ophthalmologist Emil Krückmann. In 1921 he became a full professor at the University of Jena, and in 1923 relocated to Basel as head of the university eye clinic.

== Selected works ==
- Ueber Persistenz von Resten der Tunica vasculosa lentis, 1906 – On persistence of remnants of the tunica vasculosa lentis.
- Cytologische Studien am menschlichen Auge, 1919 – Cytological studies of the human eye.
- Kurzes Handbuch der Ophthalmologie (with Franz Schieck, 7 volumes, 1930–32) – Manual of ophthalmology.
- Optische Constanten (Elemente) Refraktion, Akkommodation, 1963 – Optical constants (elements) refraction, accommodation.
