= David Klein (ophthalmologist) =

Swiss geneticist and ophthalmologist (1908–1993)

- Born: 1908
- Died: 1993 (aged 84–85)
- Education: University of Basel
- Known for: Contributions towards understanding Waardenburg syndrome
- Scientific career
- Fields: Genetics, ophthalmology
- Workplaces: University of Geneva
- Academic advisors: Adolphe Franceschetti

David Klein (1908 – 1993) was a Swiss human geneticist and ophthalmologist.

Klein graduating from the University of Basel in 1934. After graduating, he worked at the Rheinau Psychiatric Clinic, Zurich. He moved to Geneva as scientific assistant to professor Adolphe Franceschetti at the ophthalmological clinic. In 1970 he was appointed full professor. He retired in 1978 with the status of professor emeritus. After retirement, he was active as consultant in human genetics at the ophthalmological clinic, Geneva, and the school of amblyopic and blind children in Baar, Switzerland.

Klein made important contributions towards the understanding of Waardenburg syndrome, or more fully, the "van der Hoeve-Halbertsma-Waardenburg-Klein syndrome". In August 1947 Klein presented a deaf mute child, who was 10 years of age, and had partial albinism of the hair and body, blue hypoplastic irides, blepharophimosis and malformation of arms, to the Swiss Society of Genetics, and gave a full report of his findings in 1950.
