= Anterior chamber paracentesis =

Surgical procedure to reduce intraocular pressure of the eye

Anterior chamber paracentesis (ACP) is a surgical procedure done to reduce intraocular pressure (IOP) of the eye. The procedure is used in management of glaucoma and uveitis. It is also used for clinical diagnosis of infectious uveitis.

== Uses ==
Anterior chamber paracentesis is used in the management of acute angle closure glaucoma, and uveitis. It can also prevent a raise in IOP after intravitreal injections. Aqueous humor collected using anterior chamber paracentesis may be used for clinical diagnosis of infectious uveitis.

== Procedure ==
In this procedure aqueous humor from the anterior chamber of eyeball is drained out by using a tuberculin syringe, with or without a plunger attached to a hypodermic needle or a paracentesis incision. Eye is anesthetized using proparacaine or tetracaine eye drops prior to ACP. Paracentesis is performed through the clear cornea adjacent to the limbus.

== Complications ==
Pain, traumatic injuries of the iris, corneal abscess, inadvertent lens touch, occurrence of Anterior chamber fibrin, Intraocular hemorrhage, decompression retinopathy, hyphaema, ocular hypotension due to leakage and exogenous endophthalmitis are complication of ACP. Traumatic cataract may occur secondary to lens trauma.
