= Paul Ardenne =

French professor (born 1956)

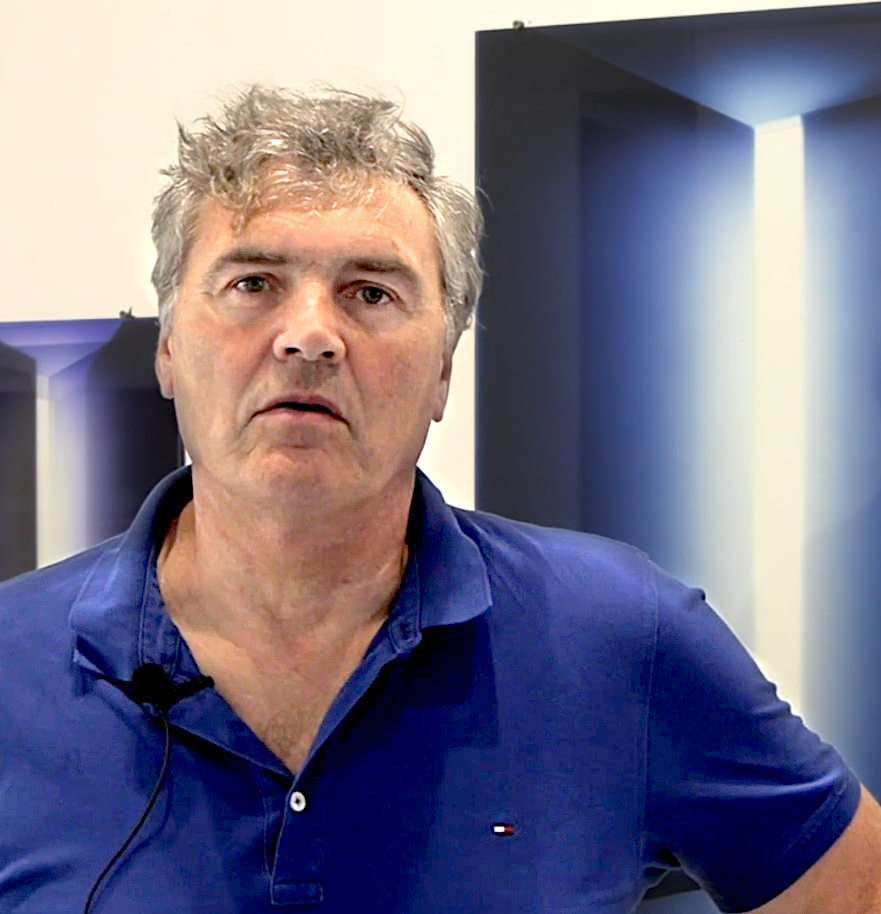
- Ardenne in 2022
- Born: October 4, 1956 (age 68)
- Occupation(s): Professor, critic, curator

Paul Ardenne (born 4 October 1956) is Professor of history at the University of Amiens, and is also an art critic and a curator in the field of contemporary art.

He grew up in a family of farmers from Charente (for a while he, too, worked in farming), he studied literature, history and philosophy at the University of Poitiers and University of Toulouse, before completing a doctorate in history of art with Laurence Bertrand Dorléac at the University of Paris I (Contemporary Fine Art – Forms and Constraints). In Paris, he encountered the future contemporary art curator, Ami Barak, as well as Catherine Millet, founder/director of Art Press and José Alvarez, director of the publishing label Regard three figures whose positions on aesthetics influenced his own views.

== Works ==
Essays

- Capc-musée 1973-1993, Editions du Regard, 1993
- La Création contemporaine entre structures et système, Publications de l’École des Beaux-arts de Rouen, 1996
- Analyser l’art vivant, s’il se peut (un constat de balbutiement), Publications de l’École des Arts décoratifs de Strasbourg, 1997
- Art, l’âge contemporain : une histoire des arts plastiques à la fin du 20ème siècle, Éditions du Regard, 1997
- Catherine Poncin, Filigranes Editions, 1999
- Patrick Mimran, Babel TV, Éditions du Regard, 1999
- L’Art dans son moment politique, La Lettre volée, 2000
- L’Image Corps - Figures de l’humain dans l’art du 20ème siècle, Éditions du Regard, 2001 (Grand Prix de l’Académie de Dijon)
- Un Art contextuel, Flammarion, 2002; rééd. coll. « Champs », 2004
- Codex Rudy Ricciotti, Birkhäuser/Ante Prima, 2003
- I setti Panazzi celesti Anselm Kiefer, Éditions du Regard, 2004
- Manuelle Gautrand: architectures, Éditions Infolio, 2005
- Topiques/Topics Alain Sarfati architecte/architect, Ante Prima-Éditions du Layeur, 2005
- Terre habitée : humain et urbain à l’ère de la mondialisation, Archibooks, 2005
- Contacts (l’architecture de Philippe Gazeau), Ante Prima-AAM, 2006
- Extrême : esthétiques de la limite dépassée, Flammarion, 2006
- Pierre et Gilles, Taschen, 2007

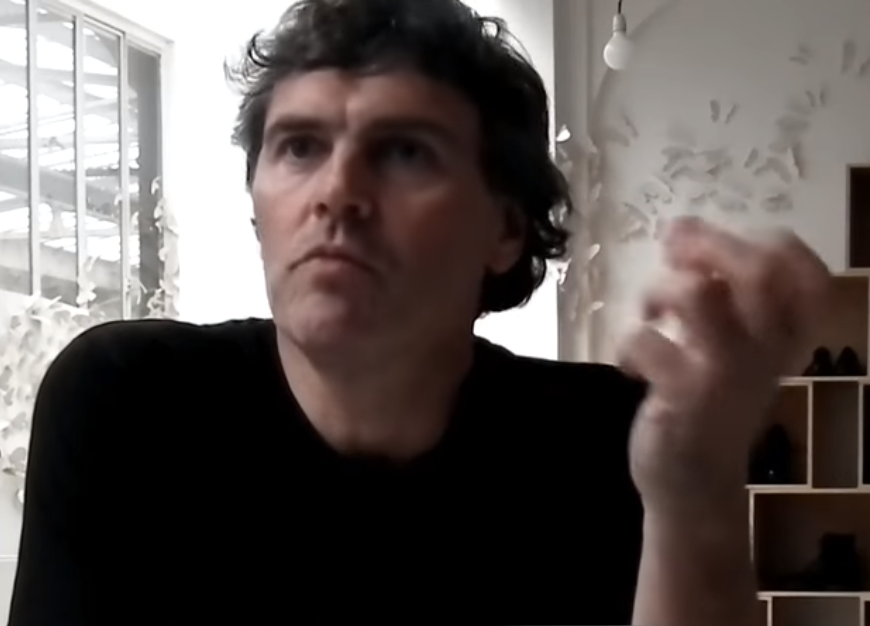
Paul Ardenne in 2012

- Lorient, Cité de la voile Eric Tabarly, Éd. Archives d’Architecture Moderne, 2008
- Palais du Cinéma à Venise, 5+1AA, Rudy Riciotti, Éd. Archives d’Architecture Moderne, 2008
- Cityrama FGP, Archibooks, 2008
- Art, le présent : la création plastique au tournant du 20ème siècle, Éditions du Regard, 2009
- Peintures. Please pay attention please, avec Barbara Polla, Éditions La Muette, 2010
- Moto, notre amour, Flammarion, 2010

Novels

- La Halte, QUE, 2003.
- Nouvel Âge, QUE-Le Grand Miroir, 2007.

In collaboration

- with Jacques Coulais, Opus, Figuier, 1990
- with Ami Barak, Guide Europe des musées d’art moderne et contemporain, Art Press, 1994
- 1989, ouvrage collectif sous la direction de P. Ardenne, Éditions du Regard, 1995
- with Pascal Beausse and Laurent Goumarre, Pratiques contemporaines : l’art comme expérience, Dis-Voir, 1999
- with Alice Laguarda, Christian Hauvette architecte, Éd. Jean-Michel Place, 2001
- La Passion de la victime (coll.), QUE, 2003
- with Élisabeth Nora, Portraiturés, Éditions du Regard, 2003
- Ouvrir Couvrir (coll.), Verdier, 2004
- with Pierre Assouline, Anselm Kiefer au Grand Palais, Éditions du Regard, 2007
- with Régis Durand, Images-monde : de l’événement au documentaire, Monografik, 2007
- with Sebastian Redecke, Brunet Saunier : Architecture, au-delà des apparences, Ante Prima, 2007
- with Alfonso Fermia, Gianluca Peluffo, Ernesta Caviola, Sebastian Redecke et Vittorio Savi, Le Nombril des Rêves, Ante Prima, 2008
- with Jean-Luc Monterosso, Pierre Restany et Nam June Paik, Catherine Ikam | Louis Fléri, Monografik, 2008
- with Andrea Bruciati, Paolo Colombo, Joseph del Pesco and Barbara Polla, Andrea Mastrovito | Tigres de papier, Monografik, 2008
- with Barbara Polla, Working Men : le travail dans l'art contemporain, Éd. QUE, 2008
- with Sophie Nemoz, Dernières nouvelles, Architecture et habitat étudiant en Europe, Éd. Archives d’architecture moderne, 2008–2009
- with Laurent Sfar and Nathalie Leleu, Interloperie, Éd. Filigranes, 2009
- with Ernesta Caviol, Qu'est-ce qu'il y a dans le frigo ? 5+1AA Archi, Éd. Archives d’architecture moderne, 2009

Curator

- Micropolitiques (Centre National d’Art Contemporain Le Magasin Grenoble, 2000, avec Christine Macel)
- Expérimenter le réel (Albi-Montpellier 2001-2002)
- La Force de l’art (Grand Palais, Paris, 2006; “Plutôt que l’exposé d’un manifeste, je veux mettre en valeur la principale qualité culturelle de l’art contemporain : sa vocation persistante à l’ "interposition” ”)
- Working men (Galerie Analix Forever, Genève, 2008)
- Prélèvements Urbains, Patrick Mimran (Passage de Retz, Paris, Novembre 2008)

== See also ==
- Author's blog
- "ENTRETIEN AVEC PAUL ARDENNE", Revue 17
- Contemporary art
