= Daniel Millar =

British-Irish actor, born 1982

Daniel Millar (born 1982) is an actor, writer and comedian from Manchester, England. He has appeared in numerous stage and screen roles since graduating from LAMDA in 2007.

== Early life and education ==
Daniel Millar was born in 1982 in Withington, Manchester, England. He is renowned for his extensive work in theatre, and has numerous television and film credits. His career is distinguished by a blend of classical theatre performances, contemporary plays, and notable screen appearances. Millar trained at LAMDA, graduating in 2007.

== Theatrical career ==
He has worked at The Royal National Theatre, The Royal Shakespeare Company, Shakespeare's Globe, The Almeida Theatre, The Royal Exchange Theatre, and in the West End. He was nominated for the Offie for Best Male Performance - Philoctetes in Stink Foot at The Yard Theatre, Hackney. He appeared as Max in Mischief Theatre's The Play That Goes Wrong, and also works extensively in immersive theatre, including various roles for Punchdrunk. In 2026, he is to appear in Helen Edmundson's new play, Some Woman at the National Theatre.

== Television and film career ==
Millar has appeared in British TV series such as Casualty, London Kills, Britannia, Doctors, Psychoville, EastEnders, and Holby City His film roles include Downton Abbey (2019) and The Current War (2017).

== Writing and adaptations ==
As a writer, Millar has translated and co-adapted several notable works by the German playwright Friedrich Schiller, including Mary Stuart, Intrigue and Love, The Robbers, and Fiesco, all performed in London by The Faction Theatre Company.

== Selected work ==
=== Theatre ===
Year	Title	Role	Company	Director
2009	The White Guard	Vassily	Royal National Theatre	Howard Davies
2011	The Crash of the Elysium	Captain Solomon	Punchdrunk	Felix Barrett
2011	Frankenstein	Felix de Lacey	Royal National Theatre	Danny Boyle
2012	The Winter's Tale	Dion	Royal Shakespeare Company	Lucy Bailey
2013	Edward II	Dog	Royal National Theatre	Joe Hill-Gibbins
2014	The Drowned Man	Bill McCormick	Punchdrunk	Felix Barrett and Maxine Doyle
2014	King Lear	Curan	Royal National Theatre	Sam Mendes
2015	The Oresteia	Chorus Leader	HOME Manchester	Blanche McIntyre
2015	Against Captain's Orders	Arthur Ambrose	Punchdrunk	Peter Higgin
2015	Stink Foot	Philoctetes	The Yard Theatre	Jeff James
2016-17	The Play That Goes Wrong	Max	Mischief Theatre (Duchess Theatre)	Mark Bell
2018	Prom Kween	Matthew/Regina/Ellen DeGeneres	Underbelly Edinburgh	Rebecca Humphries
2019	There is a Light that Never Goes Out	Burton	Royal Exchange Theatre	James Yeatman
2022	The Wonderful World of Dissocia	Oathtaker	Theatre Royal Stratford East	Emma Baggott
2022	The House of Shades	Eddie	Almeida Theatre	Blanche McIntyre
2022	Measure for Measure	Provost / Elbow	Shakespeare's Globe	Blanche McIntyre
2023	The Pillowman	Father	Duke of York's Theatre	Matthew Dunster
2024	Antony and Cleopatra	Enobarbus	Shakespeare's Globe	Blanche McIntyre
2024	The Government Inspector	Fudgel	Marylebone Theatre	Patrick Myles
2024, 2025-26	Twelfth Night	Fabian	Royal Shakespeare Company	Prasanna Puwanarajah
2025	The Constant Wife	Mortimer Durham	Royal Shakespeare Company	Tamara Harvey
2026	Private Lives	Victor Prynne	Royal Exchange Theatre	Blanche McIntyre
2026	Some Woman	Mr. Dunster	Royal National Theatre	Blanche McIntyre

=== Television ===
Year	Title	Role
2023	Doctors	Damien Byrd
2023	Casualty	Damien
2022	London Kills	Charlie Hill
2021	Britannia	Roman Scout
2019	Warren	Ashley
2019	Doctors	Gavin Savage
2018	Trying Again	Steve
2013	Doctors	Callum Reeves
2010	Psychoville	AA Man
2010	EastEnders	PC Finn Shaw
2009	Grownups	'Alex'
2009	Two Pints of Lager and a Packet of Crisps	Delivery Man
2008	Holby City	Curtis Hall
2008	Doctors	Sean Wilkes

=== Film ===
Year	Title	Role
2019	Downton Abbey	Policeman at Turton's
2018	The Current War	Father
