= McKittrick =

McKittrick may refer to:

== People ==
- Amanda Margaret Ross née McKittrick (1860–1939), known by her pen name Amanda McKittrick Ros, Northern Irish writer
- Bobb McKittrick (1935–2000), American professional football player
- David McKittrick (b. 1949), Northern Irish journalist
- Ralph McKittrick (1877–1923), American golfer and tennis player
- Rob McKittrick (b. 1973), American filmmaker

== Places ==
- McKittrick Canyon, a scenic canyon in Texas in the United States
- McKittrick Oil Field, an oil field in California in the United States
- McKittrick Hotel, site of the play Sleep No More
- McKittrick, California, a census-designated place in Kern County, California, in the United States
- McKittrick, Missouri, a city in Montgomery County, Missouri, in the United States

== See also ==
- McKitrick, an alternative spelling
- McKitterick
