= Hyperdrama (theatre) =

Drama generated by scripts written in hypertext

Hyperdrama is a dramatic performance generated by playscripts written in hypertext. The performance is noted for its split narrative with scenes branching to play simultaneously in an expanded performance space. The audience is mobile, able to follow actors and watch scenes as each individual chooses.

Several universities added the study of Hyperdrama to their hypertext and electronic media studies, including the University of Virginia, Tunxis Community College, and New York University.

== Description ==
According to Astrid Ensslin in her book Canonizing Hypertext, the term hyperdrama "was coined by hyperdramatist and theorist Charles Deemer, who understands 'traditional drama as a special case of hyperdrama'." Ensslin places Deemer's one-act hyperdrama The Last Song of Violeta Parra in the canon of "first generation hypertext."

Hannah Rudman, who wrote "The Benefactor: a Hyperdrama" in 1998 with Billy Smart, describes the form this way:

"A hyperdrama is a play that is written in hypertext, that is performed as a promenade and that is realised on multiple levels. Scenes happen simultaneously throughout a performance space."

Discussion of hyperdrama is included in the book Theatre in Cyberspace:

"... theatre practitioners are increasing their potential audiences with online technology while attempting to discover how to present theatre in an interactive yet non-corporeal way. Also fascinating is how educators and practitioners can collaborate, creating online performance spaces that can be adapted for teaching, and creating online teaching techniques that can be adapted for performance."

== Productions ==
Deemer wrote a hyperdrama expansion of Chekhov's The Seagull.

In 2009, the American Repertory Theater and Punchdrunk performed Sleep No More, "a hyperdrama rendition of Macbeth with a creepy, Hitchcock feel."

Russell Anderson, author of Woyzeck: a Hyperdrama, calls his play "a performance in the ‘hyperdrama’ format: that is, where multiple elements of performance occur in multiple locations simultaneously."

Tegan Zimmerman uses the presentation software Prezi to explore "Hypertext and Hyperdrama" and their relationship online.

== See also ==
- Dramatic theory
