= It Felt Like a Kiss =

2009 immersive theater production

- Promotional poster
- Original language: English
- Written by: Adam Curtis; Punchdrunk
- Subject: American power
- Genre: Immersive theatre

Premiere
- Date: 2 July 2009
- Place: Manchester International Festival

It Felt Like a Kiss is an immersive theatre production, first performed between 2 and 19 July 2009 as part of the second Manchester International Festival, co-produced with the BBC. Themed on "how power really works in the world", it is a collaboration between film-maker Adam Curtis and theatre company Punchdrunk, with original music composed by Damon Albarn and performed by the Kronos Quartet.

Visitors wandered among sets and watched a short film created from archival footage, weaving together multiple stories about American international and cultural influence beginning in the year 1959, touching on the Cold War, Rock Hudson and Doris Day, Lou Reed, Saddam Hussein, Lee Harvey Oswald, and the AIDS epidemic.

The title is taken from The Crystals' 1962 song "He Hit Me (And It Felt Like a Kiss)", written by Gerry Goffin and Carole King.

== Production ==
The production was staged at Quay House, in the disused former offices of the National Probation Service on Quay Street, central Manchester. The production ran between 2 and 19 July 2009, as part of the second Manchester International Festival. It Felt Like A Kiss won Punchdrunk the Manchester Evening News Theatre Award for Best Special Entertainment.

Imagine walking into a disused building. You find yourself inside a film. It is a ghost story where unexpected forces, veiled by the American Dream, come out from the dark to haunt you…

— Manchester International Festival,

An example of Curtis's use of typography in the film

The film and event makes extensive use of archive footage. Upon arrival at the event, groups of nine visitors are taken to a darkened sixth floor. The 54 minute film (available for a limited time online in the UK) is only a small section ("the film club") of the event.

Featured in the story are Eldridge Cleaver, Doris Day, Little Eva, Philip K Dick, Enos (a chimpanzee sent into space), Sidney Gottlieb, Rock Hudson, Saddam Hussein, Richard Nixon, Lee Harvey Oswald, Lou Reed, Mobutu Sese Seko, B F Skinner, Phil Spector, Tina Turner and Frank Wisner.

I wanted to do a film about what it actually felt like to live through that time ... Where you could see the roots of the uncertainties we feel today, the things they did out on the dark fringes of the world that they didn't really notice at the time, which would then come back to haunt us.

— Adam Curtis,

Unlike Curtis' earlier work which prominently feature the Helvetica typeface, Arial is used for titling. Also, Curtis' trademark narration is absent.

Sound and Show Control equipment were supplied by Bradford-based The Stage Management Company (Uk) Ltd who have also collaborated with Punchdrunk on their Duchess of Malfi and Dr Who: Crash of the Elysium projects.

The physical production consisted of elaborate walk-through sets depicting first scenes from an idyllic midcentury America and then a series of decrepit offices, hospital wards, and prison cells taken from horror films. They were separated by a theatre screening the Curtis film. The production generally lacked human performers, with notable rare exceptions including a performer as a chainsaw-wielding serial killer.

== Genesis ==
The production started life as an experimental film by Adam Curtis, commissioned by the BBC. Curtis approached Felix Barrett of the Punchdrunk theatre company, with the proposal that a production could be created "as though the audience were walking through the story of the film.”

The film was shown to Damon Albarn, already associated with the Manchester International Festival through the productions Demon Days Live in 2006 and Monkey: Journey to the West in 2007. He agreed to write a score for the production, which was then recorded by the San Francisco-based Kronos Quartet.

== Themes ==
According to Adam Curtis the production is "the story of an enchanted world that was built by American power as it became supreme...and how those living in that dream world responded to it". He has also said; "it’s trying to show to you that the way you feel about yourself and the way you feel about the world today is a political product of the ideas of that time”. According to Curtis:

"The politics of our time"..."are deeply embedded in the ideas of individualism...but it's not the be-all-and-end-all...the notion that you only achieve your true self if your dreams, your desires, are satisfied...it's a political idea."

Felix Barrett has stated that the production was influenced by his love of ghost trains and haunted houses, and by the idea of blurring fiction with reality: "It takes the idea of the viewer as voyeur and asks at what point are you watching, inside or even starring in the film".

The development of new techniques of interrogation by "everyone over Level 7" in the CIA during the 1960s is a theme of the production, and the suggestibility of human beings is something that the production seeks to highlight.

== Reception ==
The NME described the show as a “pop-art-horror walk through” that left the reviewer “breathless, mesmerised, sick to the stomach with fear and in need of a good lie down.”

Cultural historian Brett Nicholls sees the show as part of Curtis’ stance of suspicion towards the “political absurdity” of elites.

== Music ==
- "Oh What a Dream" - Ruth Brown
- "Camille" - From Le Mepris soundtrack - Georges Delerue
- "Let the Four Winds Blow" - Fats Domino
- "Stealing Fat" - From Fight Club soundtrack - Dust Brothers
- "On the Rebound" - Floyd Cramer
- "Summer Wind" - Frank Sinatra
- "What Does a Woman Do?" - Doris Day
- "Museum Mile" - Geneva
- "Monkey 23" - The Kills
- "Baja" - The Astronauts
- "Do Wah Diddy Diddy" - The Exciters
- "Just One Look" - Doris Troy
- "Monkey on Your Back" - Clinic
- "I'll Be Your Mirror" - Velvet Underground
- "Parlez-Moi d'Amour" - Lucienne Boyer
- "Pink Shoe Laces" - Dodie Stevens
- "Slap in the Face" - from The Gadfly Suite - Dimitri Shostakovich
- "Easier Said Than Done" - The Essex
- "He Hit Me (It Felt Like a Kiss)" - The Crystals
- "The Loco-Motion" - Little Eva
- "In Dreams" - Roy Orbison
- "End of the World" - Skeeter Davis
- Cha-Cha - from Symphonic Dances from West Side Story - Leonard Bernstein
- Meeting Scene - from Symphonic Dances from West Side Story
- "Who's That Guy?" - The Kolettes
- The Madison Time, Pt 1 - Ray Bryant Combo
- "All Tomorrow's Parties" - The Velvet Underground
- "Love Minus Zero/No Limit" - Bob Dylan
- "Cry to Me" - Solomon Burke
- "Freak Freak" - The Bug
- Moonlight - Four Sea Interludes (From Peter Grimes) - Benjamin Britten
- Who Is Tyler Durden? - Fight Club soundtrack - Dust Brothers
- "I Still Miss Someone" - Johnny Cash
- "Wouldn't It Be Nice?" - Beach Boys
- "Sister Ray" - The Velvet Underground
- "Have You Seen Her" - The Chi-Lites
- "River Deep Mountain High" - Ike and Tina Turner
- "Is That All There Is?" - Peggy Lee
- "Krautrock" - Faust
- Dawn - Four Sea Interludes (From Peter Grimes) - Benjamin Britten
