= Bargarran manuscript =

The Bargarran manuscript (1697) is an untitled foolscap volume in original binding containing the texts of a number of documents relating to the Bargarran witchcraft case in Renfrewshire, Scotland.

The manuscript narrates the events that took place during and after the alleged demonic possession of Christian Shaw, the 11-year-old daughter of John Shaw, the Laird of Bargarran. Christian claimed that she had been bewitched by one of the female servants of the household, and accused several people of causing her 'fits'. The Bargarran case resulted in 24 locals being implicated as Christian's bewitchers. Seven people were executed in Paisley on 10th June 1697.

The manuscript is held in the Mitchell Library in Glasgow, Scotland.
