= Sleep No More (2011 play) =

Play by British theatre company Punchdrunk

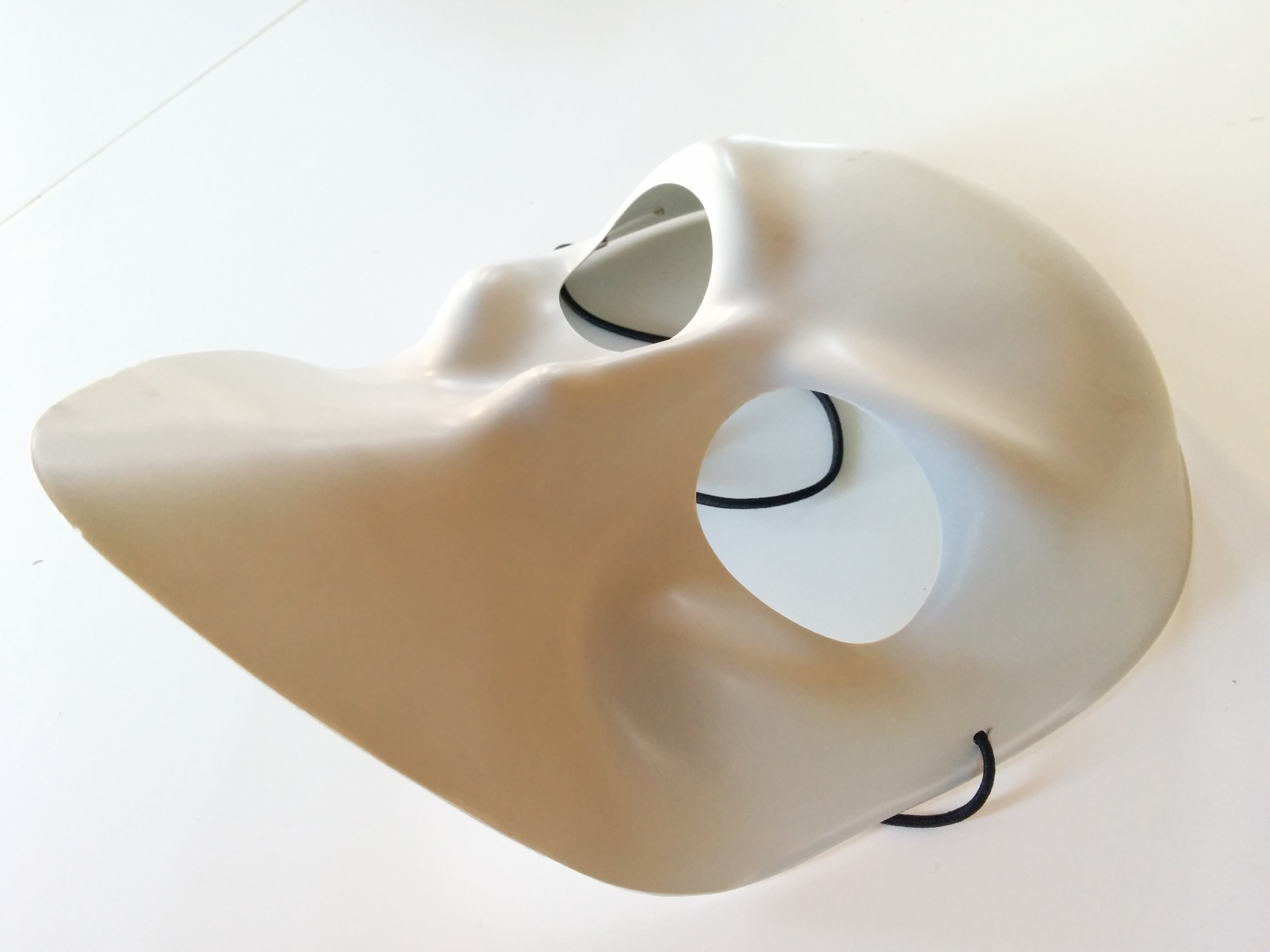
- One of the audience masks used in the production.
- Original language: English (mostly mute)
- Written by: Punchdrunk
- Based on: Macbeth by William Shakespeare
- Setting: McKittrick Hotel and environs, Gallow Green, Glamis, Forfar, Scotland

Premiere
- Date: March 7, 2011
- Place: McKittrick Hotel, 530 West 27th Street, New York City
- Directed by: Felix Barrett and Maxine Doyle
- Original run: March 7, 2011 to January 5, 2025
- Official website

Sleep No More was the New York City production of an immersive theatre work created by the British theatre company Punchdrunk. It was based primarily on William Shakespeare's Macbeth, with additional inspiration taken from noir films (especially those of Alfred Hitchcock) and the 1697 Paisley witch trials. Its title comes from Macbeth:

Methought I heard a voice cry 'Sleep no more.
Macbeth does murder sleep'

— Act II, Scene II, Lines 36–7

After incarnations in London in 2003 and Brookline, Massachusetts in 2009, Sleep No More was launched in New York City in collaboration with Emursive and began performances on March 7, 2011. The production won the 2011 Drama Desk Award for Unique Theatrical Experience and won Punchdrunk special citations at the 2011 Obie Awards for design and choreography.

Sleep No More adapted the story of Macbeth, deprived of nearly all spoken dialogue and set primarily in a dimly-lit, 1930s-era establishment called the McKittrick Hotel. Audience members moved throughout the performance space and interacted with props at their own pace; however, the actions of audience members were generally ignored by the performers and did not impact the story.

In November 2023, Emursive announced a final performance date of January 28, 2024, but the production was subsequently extended throughout 2024. In October 2024, a final performance date was announced along with a trio of farewell parties entitled APPARITIONS. The final show took place on January 5, 2025.

== Format ==
Sleep No More was unlike most theatrical productions, in that the audience wandered at their own pace throughout a set populated by actors. As such, it can be categorized as immersive theatre, promenade theatre, and environmental theatre. It was not interactive theatre because the presence of audience members had no bearing on the story or the performers except in rare instances. Despite its aesthetics and theming, Sleep No More was not a haunted attraction, although it did feature dark and supernatural elements and audience members were warned that they might experience "intense psychological situations." Its format has been compared to video games like BioShock and alternate reality games.

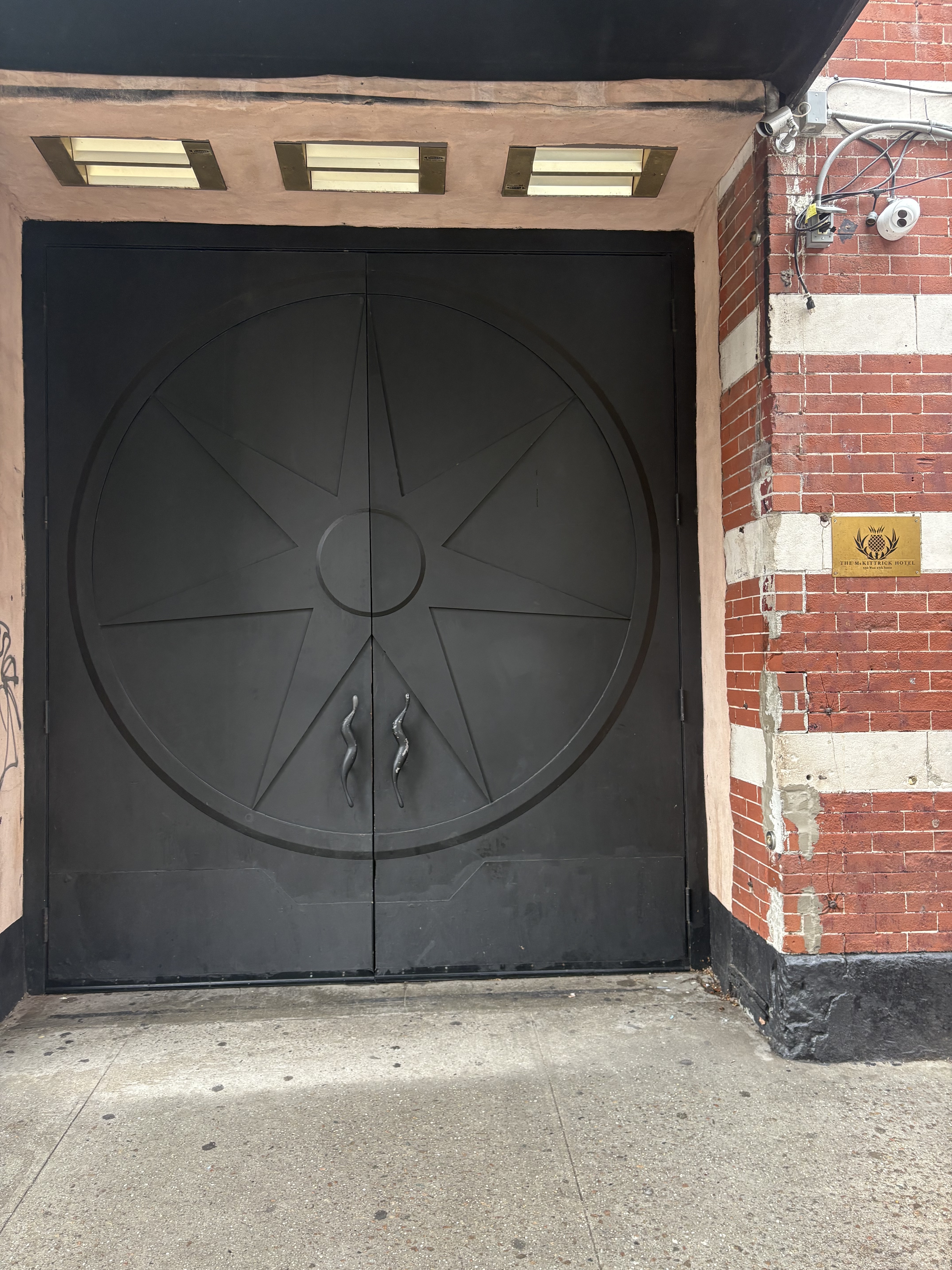
Entrance to the McKittrick Hotel

=== Pre-show ===
Guests entered the performance space through large double doors, unmarked except for a small plaque. After a coat check, they would "check in" to the hotel at a themed reception desk and receive a playing card, which was used to determine when they would enter the show. Guests would then proceed upstairs through a small, dimly lit maze, symbolizing their journey back in time. At the other end was the Manderley, a themed hotel jazz bar, where they would wait until called to enter the show. Once guests were called, they were told a few rules, handed a mask, and escorted either onto an elevator or to a stairwell to begin their show experience.

Audience members were expected to wear the mask at all times during the performance. They were also forbidden to talk outside of the entry and exit point of the show, the Manderley. Otherwise very little direction was given to audience members about what to expect or how they should interact with the show.

=== Show ===
The play consisted of three "loops" of story. Each loop lasted an hour and loosely followed the story of Macbeth from the gathering of the witches in Act I, Scene I to the appearance of Banquo's ghost at the banquet in Act III, Scene IV. Many additional scenes were added and some scenes from Macbeth, notably the second set of prophecies in Act IV, Scene I, were referenced or included before the banquet. At the end of a loop, the characters would "reset" and start the story over, performing the same actions they did in the previous loop. This structure allowed audience members to view the story from multiple perspectives by choosing different characters to follow or rooms to explore in each loop.

Because audience members were released in groups staggered throughout the first hour of the performance, they were not able to view the entire first loop and typically began to enter during the ball that Lady Macbeth throws in Duncan's honor. Additionally, some actions that occurred in the few minutes after the banquet but before the loop reset, including Macbeth's murder of Lady Macduff, did not appear in the final loop due to the finale. Because the actor who played the Taxidermist helped escort guests into the show during the first loop, that character was not present in the first loop and characters who interacted with him performed a different scene instead.

Upon entering the show, audience members could wander through any of the five visitable floors, each of which were populated by the characters (referred to in the pre-show as "residents"). The actors playing these characters were typically dressed in 1930s period clothing and were distinguishable from audience members by their lack of mask. They rarely spoke, even when interacting with other actors, and communicated primarily through their acting, choreographed dances, and written notes. Many characters moved extensively throughout the set, sometimes bounding up several flights of stairs with audience members following along behind them.

Actors generally pretended that they couldn't see audience members and rarely acknowledged them. However, there were a few scripted moments where, upon making eye contact with a specific audience member of their choosing, an actor might give them a task, whisper in their ear, or lead them into a small, private encounter. These interactions have been dubbed "one-on-ones" or "1:1s" by frequent visitors.

Staff members wearing black surgical masks were stationed at certain points throughout the set to assist audience members and actors if issues arose. They also prevented audience members from going to restricted locations and shepherded them out as the show ended.

=== Finale ===
At the end of the third loop, all of the characters converged on the ballroom. The banquet was laid out as in the previous two loops, but in this one Malcolm and Macduff kill Macbeth, symbolically breaking the loops and ending the performance. Audience members were guided back to the Manderley, where they were able to stay for a drink or depart past the gift shop and coat check.

As they were leaving, many actors would grab the hand of an audience member and pull them to the Manderley, where they would whisper a few words before departing. These were known among fans as "walkouts".

== Characters ==
While many characters were adapted more or less directly from Macbeth, others were omitted, significantly altered, or invented for Sleep No More. Many character names were borrowed from the Paisley witch trials, while other character influences came from Psycho and Rebecca.

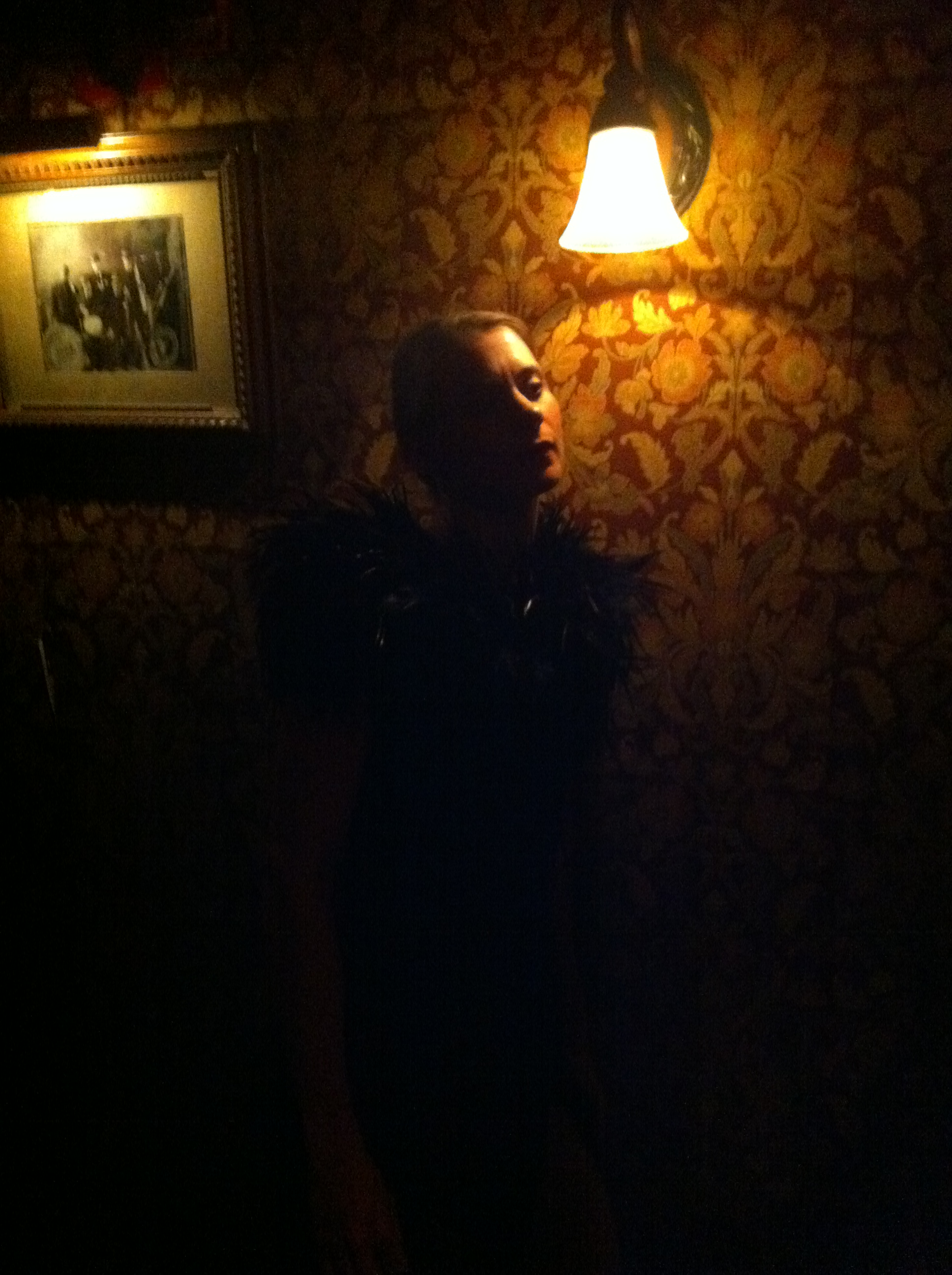
Sophie Bortolussi as Lady Macbeth in Sleep No More

In the following list, a * next to the character name indicates that they are primarily based on a character from Macbeth.

=== Principal characters ===
- Duncan* – King of Scotland and father of Malcolm. After waking up and getting dressed, he attends the ball held by Lady Macbeth in his honor. Upon leaving the ball, he is murdered by Macbeth. Catherine Campbell reanimates him for a brief dance and he contemplates his death.
- Malcolm* – Duncan's son and gumshoe private detective at the Mac Crinain & Reid Agency. He is obsessed with birds and is investigating the disappearance of Grace Naismith until he learns of his father's murder. He checks Macduff for a witch's mark and helps him kill Macbeth in the finale.
- Macbeth* – Scottish nobleman and husband of Lady Macbeth. After receiving a prophecy from the three witches, Lady Macbeth persuades him to murder Duncan. Upon receiving another prophecy from the witches and Hecate, he also murders Banquo. In the first two loops, he murders Lady Macduff after the feast; in the final loop he is killed by Malcolm and Macduff before he can do so.
- Lady Macbeth* – Scottish noblewoman and wife of Lord Macbeth. She schemes with Macbeth to murder Duncan and facilitates this by throwing a ball and drugging Duncan's drink. After Duncan's murder, she bathes Macbeth, at which point she begins a descent into madness. Following her appearance at the banquet, she goes to the sanitarium, where Nurse Shaw helps bathe her.
- Banquo* – Scottish nobleman and friend of Macbeth. After being enchanted by the two female witches and receiving a letter from the Porter, he discovers Duncan's body and raises the alarm by ringing a bell. This summons Malcolm and Macduff, who help him bring the body to the crypt. The trio head to a speakeasy to play a tense card game until it is interrupted by a bloody and furious Macbeth. Macbeth murders Banquo with a brick. Moments later, face covered in blood, Banquo stands and wanders around in shock before proceeding to the banquet.
- Macduff* – Scottish nobleman and husband of Lady Macduff. Following an argument with his wife, Macduff heads to the ball and is enchanted by Bald Witch and Sexy Witch. He responds to Banquo's summons, plays a card game with Banquo and Malcolm, and interrogates Malcolm. In the first two loops, he finds the corpse of his wife in the hotel lobby and confronts Catherine Campbell. In the final loop, he helps Malcolm kill Macbeth at the banquet.
- Lady Macduff* – Scottish noblewoman and wife of Lord Macduff. Lady Macduff is visibly pregnant in the play and is addicted to witch's milk, which Catherine Campbell repeatedly feeds her. She spends much of the play wandering around in a paranoid state apparently induced by the witch's milk, packing and unpacking a suitcase. In her first two loops, she flees from the banquet to the hotel lobby, where she is murdered by Macbeth.
- Hecate* – leader of the witches. Hecate spends most of her time in the replica bar, where she eats raw liver and lip-syncs to "Is That All There Is?". Around the midpoint of her loop, she summons the three witches and Macbeth for a rave where Macbeth receives the second set of prophecies. She is then visited by Agnes Naismith, whose tears she takes and later feeds to Speakeasy.
- Sexy Witch* (also known as Fate)– one of Hecate's followers. In addition to giving Macbeth both sets of prophecies, Sexy Witch tempts and tortures various characters, including Speakeasy, Banquo, the Porter, Macduff, and Fulton.
- Bald Witch* – one of Hecate's followers. Bald Witch begins her loop wearing a wig and removes it shortly after the ball. She helps deliver both sets of prophecies and tempts Banquo and Macduff. She also frees Boy Witch after he is trapped in the speakeasy and walks with him to the rave. She recovers in the apothecary after the rave and proceeds to the banquet. After the banquet in the first two loops, she cleans herself up and puts her wig back on.
- Boy Witch* – one of Hecate's followers. In addition to delivering both sets of prophecies to Macbeth, Boy Witch repeatedly taunts the Porter. He later causes havoc in the speakeasy before the rave and has to be freed from a box by Bald Witch. After the rave, he flees to a shower where he cries before re-dressing and heading to the banquet.
- The Porter* – manager of the hotel lobby, where he can be found for most of his loop. His name is a reference to the porter who has a brief comedic scene in Act II of Macbeth. He appears to be attracted to Boy Witch and trapped in the service of Hecate. He spends much of his time cleaning the lobby and writing notes to Hecate in the back room. He also spies on Agnes Naismith and later gives her directions to Hecate's lair in the replica bar. After being tormented by Boy Witch, he tries unsuccessfully to prevent Catherine Campbell from giving milk to Lady Macduff. In the first two loops, he hides and writes a note to Hecate as Macbeth murders Lady Macduff in the lobby.
- Catherine Campbell (also known as the Maid or Mrs. Danvers) – maid at the McKittrick. She spends much of her time around Duncan, rearranging his room and sharing a brief dance with him after she resurrects him. Catherine Campbell repeatedly feeds Lady Macduff witch's milk and helps Lady Macbeth drug Duncan's drink. She takes a letter from the Porter to the Macbeth residence before putting the resurrected Duncan to bed. In the Boston production and early in the New York production, she was named Mrs. Danvers after the character in Rebecca.
- Speakeasy Bartender – bartender at a speakeasy and Hecate's familiar spirit. He spends most of his loop in the speakeasy, where he cleans the bar and plays card games. He interacts with Sexy Witch, Fulton, Agnes Naismith, Boy Witch, Bald Witch, Malcolm, Macduff, Banquo, and Macbeth as they pass through the speakeasy. He briefly visits the taxidermist's shop and the funeral home before being fed Agnes' tears by Hecate.
- Agnes Naismith – a young woman who arrives at the McKittrick Hotel looking for her missing sister, Grace. She has a brief flirtation with Fulton, during which she steals his money, and another with Malcolm after he checks her for a witch's mark. The Porter spies on her, but eventually directs her to Hecate at the replica bar. Hecate collects tears from Agnes, at which point Agnes returns to her apartment to sleep for the rest of her loop. In the Boston production, this character was known as the Second Mrs. de Winter, a reference to the narrator of Rebecca.
- Fulton (also known as the Tailor or Mr. J Fulton) – tailor and cunning person working against the forces of evil. He flirts with Agnes Naismith when she arrives in his shop, but is rejected. The Taxidermist asks Fulton to repair his coat, which results in a scuffle. Speakeasy and Sexy Witch also scare Fulton off and, after viewing the rave through an open door, Fulton returns to his shop. He later sneaks into Agnes' room while she's sleeping to cover her with a blanket.
- The Taxidermist (also known as Mr. Bargarran) – a taxidermist who struggles with Fulton. He spends most of his loop around his shop, tidying up. He asks Fulton to repair his lab coat but this results in an altercation between the two in the tailor shop. He gives notes to Lady Macduff, one of which is sewn into a teddy bear and placed in her residence. He also engages in some mysterious rituals in the woods outside of King James Sanitarium and the graveyard near the Macbeth residence. He confronts Fulton again about a missing object but leaves when Fulton barricades himself in the funeral parlor.
- Nurse Shaw (also known as Christian Shaw or the Orderly)– nurse at King James Sanitarium, where she stays for the majority of her loop. She cares for Matron Lang after witnessing her collapse, but is scared off when Matron Lang begins banging her rocking chair against the wall. Nurse Shaw makes her way to the operating theater where she realizes that her hand appears to be acting of its own accord. She again meets Matron Lang in the woods and the two mirror each other's movement. Nurse Shaw later discovers Lady Macbeth in a bed at the sanitarium. She helps Lady Macbeth into a bath and brings Lady Macbeth's dress down to her residence. Although Nurse Shaw was usually played by a female actor, she would sometimes be played by a male actor; in this case the character was sometimes called the Orderly.
- Matron Lang (also known as Margaret Lang) – reclusive, possibly prophetic, head nurse at King James Sanitarium. She spends almost her entire loop sitting in a rocking chair in a small hut in the woods outside of the sanitarium, often staring silently at the wall. At one point, she leaves her hut to write something on a post and then collapses. Nurse Shaw helps her back to her hut, but leaves when Matron Lang begins banging her rocking chair against the wall. Matron Lang later leaves the hut again to wander in the woods where she encounters Nurse Shaw and the two mirror each other's movements. Matron Lang then returns to her hut.

=== Secondary characters ===
- Sixth Floor Nurse – a mysterious nurse who appears periodically on the fifth floor. After a few moments of sitting in a corner, they pull an audience member to the sixth floor for a special one-on-one related to the Manderley estate in Rebecca.
- Man in Bar/Woman in Bar – two actors who remained in the Manderley for the duration of the show. They would greet audience members arriving at the Manderley and call them by groups based on the playing card they received. They would provide instructions to the audience, give them their mask, and welcome them back upon exiting. While the official name of the character was Man in Bar or Woman in Bar, each performer invented their own persona, often with elaborate backstories to uncover that connected them with the other Men or Women in Bar.
- James the Elevator Operator (also known as the Bellhop) – a bellhop who controls the elevator taking audience members from the Manderley to the show area. James was usually played by the same actor as Bargarran the Taxidermist, meaning that the Taxidermist did not appear in the show until all of the guests had entered and the elevator operator was no longer needed (generally in the second loop).
- Singer – a singer helped direct guests when they entered the Manderley and performed live music upon their exit from the show.

=== Temporary characters ===
Some characters appeared for only a limited time and were later retired.

- George Islay – Grace Naismith's love interest, who appeared in a padded cell on the fifth floor during a brief partnership between Punchdrunk and MIT Media Lab.
- The Reverend (also known as Reverend Shaw) – a pious hermit found in an igloo-like structure off one of the asylum wings from spring 2015 to May 14th 2016. He collected information on the witches with help from Caroline Reville and may have been Nurse Shaw's father. Clips from a radio program he hosted were broadcast on the fifth floor during the APPARITIONS farewell parties.
- Caroline Reville – the secretary of Malcolm's detective agency with her own ties to the supernatural. Like the Taxidermist/James, the actor playing Caroline would help some guests enter the show as a character known as the Curator. She worked with the Reverend and also appeared from spring 2015 to May 15th 2016. After her departure from the show, her resignation letter could be found in the agency.
- The Oracle (also known as the Fortune Teller or Annabella Lovel) – a fortune teller who remained in the Manderley for the duration of the show, occasionally offering guests tarot card readings. This character did not appear when the show reopened after its hiatus caused by the COVID-19 pandemic.
- Maximilian and Oz – two characters related to the Manderley. One of the Person in Bar characters was originally known as Maximilian Martell in reference to Mr. Maximilian de Winters from Rebecca. Maximilian was later replaced with Oswald Bustillo (Oz), but this was eventually dropped in favor of more anonymous Person in Bar characters. Even after the characters departed from the show, guests who purchased a premium entry were known as "Maximilian's Guest" or "Oz's Guest" and emails to guests were sometimes signed with one of the character's names.

Other characters referenced in Sleep No More but not appearing in it, including Grace Naismith and the owner of Paisley Sweets, appeared at some parties hosted at the McKittrick.

== Set and theming ==
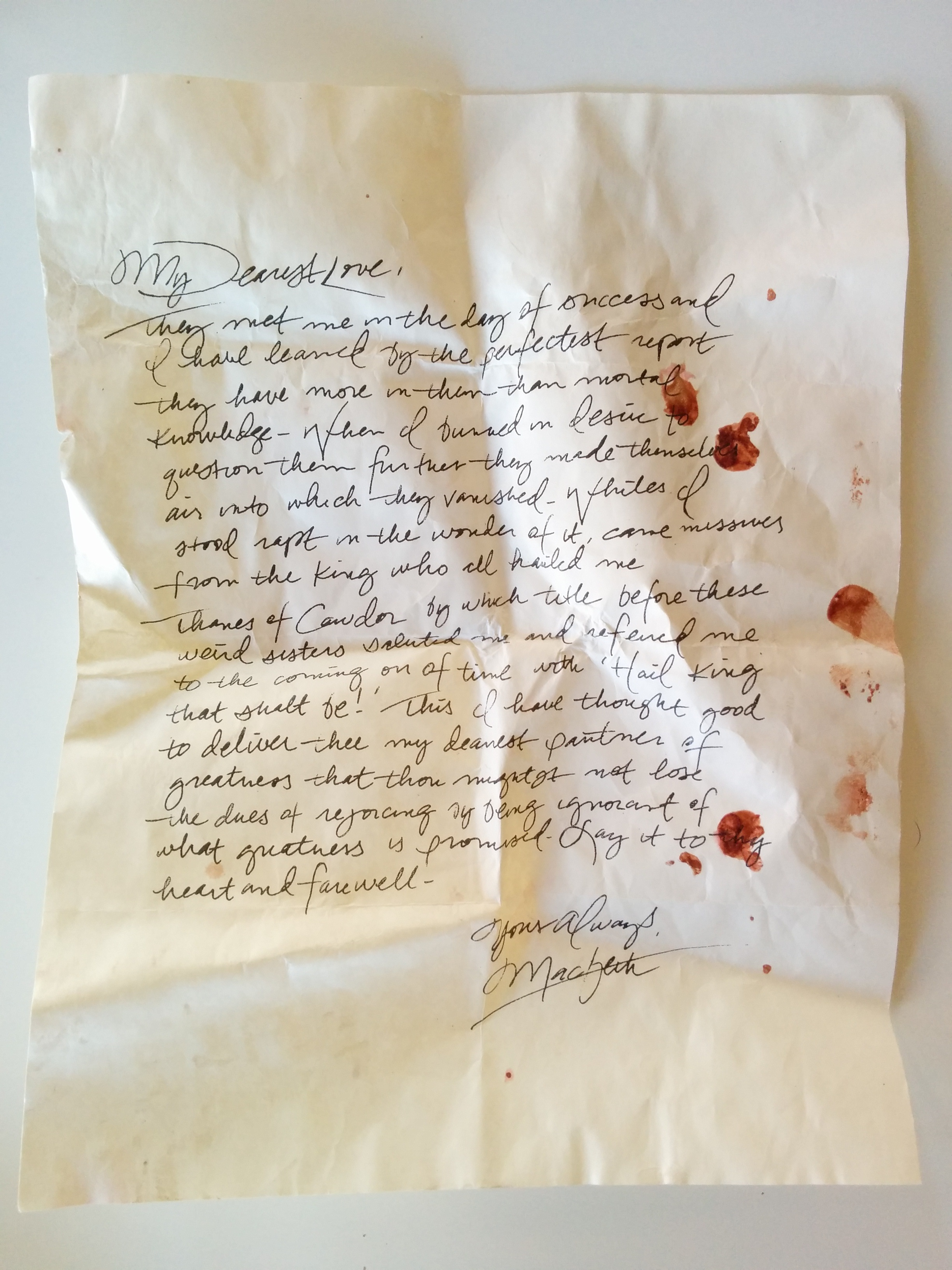
A prop letter from Macbeth to Lady Macbeth

Sleep No More was set in the fictitious McKittrick Hotel, whose website claimed that it had been recently "restored" but which was actually a block of warehouses. The McKittrick Hotel consisted of five audience-accessible floors, throughout which the action of Sleep No More took place simultaneously. Not all rooms or floors were related to the hotel theming. Various set elements established the setting as the fictitious town of Gallow Green, Glamis, Forfar, Scotland (named after the spot where witches were burned alive during the Paisley witch trials).

=== Set description ===
- Floor 1 – The McKittrick Hotel Ballroom. This floor was mostly taken up by a large ballroom which included a dance area and a long table for the banquet scene. It was also the setting of the finale. There was a small crypt on this floor, as well as a mezzanine level which contained a room for Catherine Campbell and a room, study, chapel, and canopy area belonging to Duncan. In addition to Catherine Campbell and Duncan, all characters attending the ball or banquet visited this level, as did the remaining characters during the finale.
- Floor 2 – The McKittrick Hotel Lobby. This floor was themed to resemble a hotel lobby, which included a front desk, a dining room, a small stage, phone booths, a dressing room, a lost luggage area, a lost items area, and an office for the Porter. The Porter spent his entire loop on this floor, where he was visited by the witches, Lady Macduff, Agnes Naismith, Catherine Campbell, Macbeth, Banquo, Macduff, and Lady Macbeth. The Manderley was also on this level, although no principal characters went there during their loops.
- Floor 3 – The McKittrick Hotel Residences. This floor was home to the Macbeth's residence, consisting of a large bedroom with a tub in the middle and a ruined courtyard surrounding it. Beyond this was a cemetery and the Macduff residence, which consisted of a living room, a bedroom for Lord and Lady Macduff, a child's bedroom, and a room with a crib. This floor was primarily used by Lord and Lady Macbeth and Lord and Lady Macduff but was also visited by Nurse Shaw, Catherine Campbell, Fulton, and the Taxidermist.
- Floor 4 – The High Street of Gallow Green. This floor was themed as the high street of a small town in Scotland. There was a large street with a number of storefronts, including Malcolm's detective agency (Mac Crinain & Reid) with a dark room in the back, a funeral parlor with a mortuary room, Bargarran's taxidermy shop, a sweets shop (Paisley Sweets), and Fulton's tailor shop. Also on the high street was Agnes Naismith's apartment, which had a small living room in front with a bedroom behind it. Off of the high street was a passage to a speakeasy with a winding storage room behind it. A different passage gave access to a small interrogation room, a locked law office, and the "replica bar," which resembled a dark version of the Manderley and was usually occupied by Hecate. Behind the taxidermy shop was a desk for the taxidermist, a shower, and an apothecary; this area was also accessible from the replica bar. Hecate, Speakeasy, Agnes Naismith, Fulton, the Taxidermist, and Malcolm all spent substantial time on this floor, while most other characters passed through.
- Floor 5 – The King James Sanitarium. This floor resembled an antiquated asylum, including a bed ward, a bath ward full of bathtubs, an operating theater, a pair of offices, a small prayer room, a laundry room, a room with medical equipment, and a padded cell. Beyond bath ward was a woods, devoid of leaves and in the shape of a maze. The woods contained a taxidermy goat statue, a padlocked gate, a post, and a hut belonging to, and usually occupied by, Matron Lang. This floor was almost exclusively used by Nurse Shaw and Matron Lang, with visits from Lady Macbeth, the Taxidermist, and the Sixth Floor Nurse.

There was a small performance space on the sixth floor as well, but it was not open to guests unless they were selected by the Sixth Floor Nurse for a special one-on-one interaction.

=== Theming ===
All areas of the set were consistent with the 1930s theming and were generally detailed. Many of the residences contained letters between characters that audience members were welcome to read at their leisure; some of these were written on stationary from the McKittrick and include its logo and address. Books were included in many locations, such as Rebecca in Agnes Naismith's living room, a Bible in Fulton's shop, books on witchcraft and botany in the apothecary, and children's books in the Macduff residence. Trees, symbolizing the Birnam Wood prophecy in Macbeth, could be found in the ballroom, as a chess set in the hotel lobby, and in Malcolm's office. Other set details included:

- large advertisements on the Gallow Green high street
- walls of keys, a locker of abandoned items, and a menu for the restaurant in the hotel lobby
- pages of books with lines cut out throughout the fourth and fifth floors
- jars of medicine, locks of patients' hair, and medical records throughout the sanitarium
- jars of sweets in Paisley's Sweets
- a trick mirror in the Macduff residence that revealed bloodstains on a child's bed
- cubbies full of paper boats and crosses made of utensils stuck in salt in the hotel lobby
- a symbol for the witch's coven that could be found in the tiles of the ballroom and in feathers on the wall of the padded cell
- a neon sign leading to the replica bar reading "Hello There" designed so that the "o" and "T" would flicker, rendering it "Hell here"

There were also some items that audience members were allowed to take, namely the sweets in Paisley's Sweets and the various business cards available on the high street.

=== Music ===
Music, specifically a film noir soundtrack found by creator Felix Barrett, was the origin point of the show. Period and often diegetic music by artists such as the Ink Spots, Glenn Miller, and Peggy Lee played throughout the space, as did ambient music by sound designer Stephen Dobbie. Orchestral music was also played throughout and, in keeping with the inspiration from Vertigo and Rebecca, it came mostly from Bernard Herrmann's scores to Alfred Hitchcock films. Other sound effects, such as thunderclaps or bells, happened simultaneously on most floors as well, though with different volumes relative to the area of the performance where the sounds originated.

Notable songs include:

- "Is That All There Is?" by Tony Bennett, which Hecate lip-synced to a warped version in the replica bar. Boy Witch simultaneously lip-synced to a cover by Peggy Lee in the hotel lobby.
- "A Nightingale Sang in Berkeley Square" by Glenn Miller, which was played immediately after the finale.
- "Prelude / Nightmare" from the Vertigo soundtrack, which was played as the character loops conclude and reset.
- "My Man" by Peggy Lee, which was played during the card game between Malcolm, Macduff, and Banquo.
- "Reece" by Ed Rush and Optical, which was played during the rave in the replica bar that represents the witches delivering the second set of prophecies to Macbeth.

== Production history and related productions ==
=== Production history ===
Sleep No More was first produced at the Beaufoy Building in London in 2003 and was later renewed in a 2009 collaboration with Boston's American Repertory Theatre at the Old Lincoln School in Brookline, Massachusetts.

Its production in New York City was the first to collaborate with the production company Emursive and began on March 7, 2011.

April Fool's Day in 2012 and 2024 featured special performances called Sleep No More: Remixed, in which all music usually accompanying the production was replaced.

From May 14-19, 2012, MIT Media Lab ran an experiment where online participants were paired with audience members wearing special masks. The online participants were able to enter text via a web portal and receive real-time audio and visual input from the audience member's mask. Audience member participants were guided through a new storyline involving interactive props and character interactions. The experiment seems to have had numerous issues, including uncomfortable masks, technical problems, and participants missing cues to follow the intended story.

Sleep No More was closed in March 2020 due to the COVID-19 pandemic and returned on February 14, 2022. Upon reopening, different masks were used to better accommodate KN95 surgical masks and certain show elements were altered. Many of these changes, including the masks, were reverted to their pre-COVID state by the time of the show's closure in January 2025.

In November 2023, Emursive announced a final performance date of January 28, 2024, but the production was subsequently extended throughout 2024. The final show took place on January 5, 2025.

=== Related productions ===
On July 13, 2016, Punchdrunk announced that Sleep No More would make its Asian premiere in Shanghai in December of the same year. This was the first co-production between Punchdrunk International and Chinese company SMG Live. The original creative team behind Punchdrunk's Sleep No More all worked on the Shanghai production, but the company was made up of long-term Punchdrunk collaborators as well as Chinese performers working with Punchdrunk for the first time.

The Shanghai production of Sleep No More was housed in a disused building five stories high, renamed the "McKinnon Hotel", in the Jing'an District of the city. It combined the original story from Macbeth with Chinese folk myths. Its run ended following a final performance on August 30, 2026.

A new production in Seoul at the Daehan Theater in partnership with the Miss Jackson production company was announced in 2024. It opened on August 21, 2025 and is set at the "McKithan Hotel".

In August 2024, Emursive launched Life and Trust, which largely followed Sleep No More's format including audience masks, lack of dialogue, emphasis on dance, and a looping structure. Life and Trust closed abruptly following a final performance on April 19, 2025.

== Cast ==
The official program credits the following creative team at Punchdrunk:

- Direction: Felix Barrett & Maxine Doyle
- Design: Felix Barrett, Livi Vaughn, & Beatrice Minns
- Choreography: Maxine Doyle
- Sound design: Stephen Dobbie
- Lighting design: Felix Barrett & Euan Maybank
- Costume design: David Israel Reynoso
- Lighting co-design: Austin R. Smith
- Associate costume design: Becka Landau
- Assistant designer: Zoe Franklin
- Assistant designer: Lucia Rosenwald
- Associate choreographer: Conor Doyle
- Senior event manager: Carolyn Rae Boyd
- Production consultant: Colin Nightingale

The Sleep No More cast typically played multiple roles so that actors could switch off between more physically demanding roles (like Macbeth and Lady Macbeth) and less strenuous ones (like Fulton and Matron Lang). The original cast list credits the following:

- Phil Atkins: Duncan
- Nick Atkinson: Man in Bar (Maximilian Martell)
- Kelly Bartnik: Bald Witch, Catherine Campbell
- Sophie Bortolussi: Lady Macbeth, Agnes Naismith
- Eric Jackson Bradley: Macbeth
- Nicholas Bruder: Macbeth, Porter
- Ching-i Chang: Sexy Witch, Nurse Shaw
- Hope T. Davis: Bald Witch, Catherine Campbell
- Stephanie Eaton: Sexy Witch, Nurse Shaw
- Gabriel Forestieri: Banquo, Fulton
- Maya Lubinksy: Woman in Bar (Constance DeWinter)
- Jeffery Lyon: Banquo, Fulton
- Careena Melia: Hecate
- Jordan Morley: Boy Witch, Speakeasy
- Luke Murphy: Macduff, Taxidermist
- Matthew Oaks: Porter, Orderly
- Ali Ross: Lady Macduff, Matron
- Adam Scher: Taxidermist
- Paul Singh: Boy Witch, Speakeasy
- John Sorensen-Jolink: Macduff, Taxidermist
- Tori Sparks: Lady Macbeth, Agnes Naismith
- Lucy York: Lady Macduff, Matron Lang

== Reception ==
=== Critical and scholarly response ===
Critics have favorably compared the production to other works from a wide range of media, with New York Magazine's Scott Brown referencing BioShock, Lost, Inception, and M. C. Escher, and The New York Times’ Ben Brantley referencing Stanley Kubrick, Joseph Cornell, David Lynch and Disney's Haunted Mansion. The production is mostly wordless, prompting The New Yorker's Hilton Als to write: "Because language is abandoned outside the lounge, we’re forced to imagine it, or to make narrative cohesion of events that are unfolding right before our eyes. We can only watch as the performers reduce theatre to its rudiments: bodies moving in space. Stripped of what we usually expect of a theatrical performance, we’re drawn more and more to the panic the piece incites, and the anxiety that keeps us moving from floor to floor." Testimonials for Sleep No More have also been given by such celebrities as Neil Patrick Harris, Brendon Urie, Leslie Odom, Jr., Evan Rachel Wood, and Aaron Paul, all of whom have also appeared as guest characters in the production.

The show has received positive reviews in several publications including, The New York Times, New York Magazine, The New York Post, and Time Out New York, as well as a critical essay in The New Yorker and the cover article of the August 2011 Vanity Fair.

Robert Shaughnessy compared the immersion of Sleep No More to that of the Shakespeare's Globe theater in London, which stages Shakespeare's plays in a modern reconstruction of their original venue, the Globe Theatre. Shakespeare scholar Thomas Cartelli has criticized the production's lack of focus on its principal source, claiming that the overarching structure based on Macbeth serves "only as an occasion around which so much that is decidedly not Macbeth circulates." Critic and Shakespeare scholar W. B. Worthen notes Sleep No More's "complex duplicity of practice," in that it relies upon conventions of theater and traditional interpretations of Shakespeare while engaging in contemporary, experimental theatricality.

=== Audience response ===
As of March 2021, Sleep No More currently has an average rating of 4 out of 5 stars on Yelp, based on 1,284 reviews, with 70% of all reviews being 4 stars or above. Similarly, on TripAdvisor, Sleep No More has garnered 1,625 customer reviews, with 77% being either 4 or 5 stars. Many longtime fans of the show have also created dedicated blogs on sites such as Tumblr, where they share their experiences, reviews, and derivative fan works based on the show, story, characters, and cast.

=== Controversy ===
In 2018, Buzzfeed News reported that eight performers and staffers stated that they had been groped by audience members during the show. Further reporting has found similar issues in other immersive shows, although the anonymity provided by audience masks in Sleep No More may have inadvertently encouraged such behavior and made it harder to identify perpetrators. Following this report, a line was added to the pre-show speech telling audience members to keep a respectful distance from actors and intimacy coordinators were hired in 2019.

Sleep No More was engaged in lawsuits alleging unpaid rent and expired permits, which were resolved in 2025 with Sleep No More's production company owing more than $4 million in back rent.

== See also ==
- Site-specific theatre
- Postmodern theatre
