= Katherine Campbell (accused witch) =

- Died: 10 June 1697; Gallow Green, Paisley
- Cause of death: Execution
- Occupation: Servant
- Known for: Accused witch during Paisley Witch trials

Katherine Campbell (Katie Campbell, Catherine Campbell) (born circa 1677; died 10 June 1697) was a maidservant accused of theft and witchcraft during the last major witch hunt in Scotland, the Paisley witch trials.

== Biography ==
Campbell is described as " a young, well-favoured lass, twenty years of age". She was an economic migrant who had travelled from the Highlands of Scotland to obtain work in Paisley, Renfrewshire.

In August 1696, Christian Shaw, the ten or eleven-year-old daughter of the wealthy laird of Bargarran near Erskine, accused Campbell, a maidservant in the Bargarran household, of theft when she supposedly saw Campbell sneaking a drink of milk in the kitchen. Shaw reported the theft to her mother who reprimanded Campbell.

Later, after Campbell had scolded the child for telling tales on her and angrily shouted curses at her ( "The Devil harl (drag) your soul through hell!"), Shaw claimed that Campbell had bewitched her and caused her to fall ill.

This illness of Shaw took the form of violent fits, struggling against invisible attackers. Shaw would cry out in these fits again and again that Campbell and Agnes Naismith, a poor elderly widow, were cutting her body with knives, despite neither woman being in the vicinity. Christian placed the blame for her illness on a coven of witches in town, a coven led by her servant Katherine Campbell.

By January 1697, her father John Shaw, had heard enough and requested a special commission be set up to investigate the case 35 were accused of witchcraft - both men and women - resulting in the last major witch hunt in Scotland, the Paisley witch trials. Campbell was already remanded in custody, having tried to flee as soon as she had heard she was to be accused of witchcraft.

On 18 February 1697 the Commission delivered their report to the Privy Council in Edinburgh citing clear evidence of witchcraft. Twenty-two were determined to be suspects for speedy trial.

The trial opened in Paisley on the 13th April 1697 but no fair hearing was ever likely. The jury were told that if they acquitted the accused then they too would be deemed "accessory to all the blasphemies, apostasies, murders, tortures, and seductions, whereof these enemies of heaven and earth should be guilty."

Seven were tried and seven found guilty. These included Katherine Campbell, Agnes Naismith, Margaret Lang, Margaret Fulton, John Reid, John Lindsay, and James Lindsay. The Lindsay brothers were only eleven and fourteen years old.

Supernatural evidence was used against Campbell in that Shaw had been throwing up hairballs and this stopped as soon as a ball of hair of several colours found in Katherine Campbell's pocket upon her arrest, was burnt. The link between Shaw's affliction and Campbell's possessing of the hairball, with its likeness in colour to Shaw's own hair, was established and given credulity by witness testimony. Campbell denied all knowledge of it, but the presence of the hairball was deemed enough to be proof of Campbell's guilt.

== Death ==
While one of the accused, John Reid, killed himself in prison, the other six were executed by hanging before being burnt at the stake in front of a massive crowd at Gallow Green at the West End of Paisley.

The accused were each allowed to speak from the scaffold before they were executed in turn. The two young Lindsay brothers were reportedly garrotted together as they held onto each other’s hands but...

"Katherine Campbell, the Shaw's maid who had unwittingly perhaps started the whole affair, made the crowd gasp in mixed horror and admiration. Refusing to go quietly, she was dragged screaming and struggling to the scaffold, where she shrieked down the vengeance of both God and the Devil upon her persecutors before being flung into oblivion."

One gruesome account states some of the accused were not dead when they were set on fire and that the executioner had to borrow a walking stick to push the victims back into the fire when they tried to crawl their way out.

Campbell's burnt remains were buried with the other accused at Maxwellton Cross, where the intersection of Maxwellton Street and George Street are today. This mass grave, marking the last of the major witch hunts in Europe, was adorned by a horseshoe and a circle of cobblestones. The horseshoe, according to Paisley folklore, was thought to bring prosperity to Paisley as long as it remained there. This was until the horseshoe was lost in the 1970s and the town's fortunes entered a period of decline.

== See also ==
- Paisley witches
