= Audience immersion =

Audience immersion is a storytelling technique which attempts to make the audience feel as though they are a part of the story or performance, a state which may be referred to as "transportation" into the narrative, permitting high levels of suspension of disbelief. Audience immersion may be used to enhance learning or to create a more realistic experience. Various methods may be employed to this end, including narrative perspective in writing or technical design in the performing arts. An early example of audience immersion is from the 1846 travelogue Pictures from Italy by Charles Dickens, in which the narrator, speaking in the first person, addresses the reader using second-person pronouns, allowing the reader to "picture themselves with Dickens as he travels."

In theatre, audio-visual technologies have been increasingly employed to increase immersion. For example, the 2019 Cold War play Anna used binaural sound transmitted through headphones to make "each spectator culpable in the tale of spying, surveillance and secrets" in a voyeuristic manner. Immersive theater is a style of theater that enforces audience immersion by physically placing the audience within the performance space, allowing interaction with performers, and breaking the fourth wall during the performance. British theatre company Punchdrunk is well known for its immersive theatre productions, such as Sleep No More, an adaptation of Macbeth.

Many audiovisual media formats including video games attempt to employ audience immersion. In video gaming, audience immersion has been studied as a strategy for promoting behavior change for the implementation of public health objectives.
