= Sweet Pickle Books =

Independent book store in New York City

Coordinates: 40.716475°N 73.991192°W

- Type: Private
- Industry: Bookseller
- Founded: November 2020
- Headquarters: New York City, United States
- Number of locations: 1 store
- Area served: New York metropolitan area
- Products: New, used and rare books
- Owner: Leigh Altshuler
- Website: www.sweetpicklebooks.com

Sweet Pickle Books is an independent book store in Lower East Side in New York City, where customers can trade in books for jars of pickles.

Customers can bring in any five books for a jar of pickles. There are three different types of pickles jars to choose from: Bread & Butter Pickles, the Big Jar of Dill Pickle, and the Big Jar of Spicy Pickles.

The owner is Leigh Altshuler. Altshulser started the bookstore in November 2020 during the COVID-19 pandemic.

== History ==
In November 2020 during the COVID-19 pandemic, former communications director for the Strand Bookstore, Leigh Altshuler, lost her job at McKittrick Hotel and started the bookstore with 360 jars of pickles she preserved herself. She has had the dream of opening up her own bookstore for most of her life, and was reminded of her admiration of bookstores when Mercer Street Books in New York City was ordered to close during the pandemic. As someone with Jewish heritage, Altshuler felt pickles and books paired well given the neighborhood’s history as a Jewish area known for its nearly 3,000 pickle stores at the turn of the century. As of 2025, Altshuler has been outsourcing pickles from a farm in Texas and has now sold over 80,000 jars of pickles.

== Reception ==
Celebrities such as Harry Styles, Olivia Wilde, Emma Roberts, and Jacob Elordi have been cited as customers. Moreover as of August 2025, the store is "bursting at the seams", where owner Altshuler has been looking to open a second storefront which she will call "Sweet Pickle Books: Rare, Fine and Fancy".

The New York Times describes Sweet Pickle Books as a, "winningly chaotic small shop" and also describe the "vibe here is more happenstance, as if the owner had just cleared out a few apartments on the Upper West Side that hadn’t been touched since 'Annie Hall' was in theaters".
