= The Masque of the Red Death (play) =

2007–2008 English theatre production

- Original language: English
- Written by: Punchdrunk (directed by Felix Barrett and Maxine Doyle)

Premiere
- Date: 17 September 2007
- Place: Lavender Hill, Wandsworth, London, England
- Official website

The Masque of the Red Death was an original theatre production by British theatre company Punchdrunk, in collaboration with the Battersea Arts Centre that ran from September 2007 to April 2008

== Overview ==
The Masque of the Red Death was a major theatre production by British company Punchdrunk, following their production of Faust in 2006 and echoing the format of that show. It played for a 7-month sold-out run, and was seen by more than 40,000 people, involving a cast of around 35 and utilising almost all of the space within the Battersea Arts Centre building. The narrative was based on the short stories of Edgar Allan Poe, including but not limited to "The Masque of the Red Death" (1842). The production fell within several genres of theatre, including site-specific theatre, promenade theatre, interactive theatre and immersive theatre. The audience members, who were free to roam around the sets at will, wore white masks to distinguish themselves from the cast who were maskless and the stewards/staff who wore discreet black masks. The narrative was communicated through a series of overlapping scenes blending the mediums of interpretive dance, contemporary dance and traditional acting.

Following the show on Friday and Saturday nights throughout the run were "Red Death Lates", an open after-party for show attendees and others, involving members of the cast together with changing external entertainment. The move from the main theatre show through to the afterparty was handled seamlessly by virtue of the fact that the final scene in The Masque of the Red Death involved a party in the main hall in celebration of the passing of the eponymous plague. Although the main elements of the show were a collaboration between Punchdrunk and the Battersea Arts Centre, the production also commissioned other artists and groups to create hidden set pieces within the performance in response to themes of the main show, including Kneehigh, Blind Summit, Julian Fox, Kazuko Hohki, Hannah Ringham and BAC's Young People's Theatre.

== Narrative ==
Despite the title, the show was actually based on eight Edgar Allan Poe tales, including "The Masque of the Red Death", "The Black Cat", "William Wilson", "The Fall of the House of Usher", "Berenice", "Ligeia", "The System of Doctor Tarr and Professor Fether", "The Telltale Heart" and "The Cask of Amontillado". The show did not utilise a central narrative beyond the loose themes of The Masque of the Red Death, but rather encouraged the audience to experience short sections of acting and dance described in the Financial Times as "an impressionistic collage of several of Edgar Allan Poe’s stories rather than anything resembling a linear drama". The audience were encouraged to explore the space in their own way by roaming individually, making active choices about their experience and exploring the work of the artists on their own terms. Beyond the individual performances and setpieces themselves, audience members could enrich their understanding of the narrative by interacting with the hundreds of detailed props, such as notes, messages, diaries and labels.

== Venue ==
The venue for the show was the Old Town Hall (built 1893), Lavender Hill, Wandsworth, London, home to the Battersea Arts Centre since 1965 The show utilised almost all of the building, relying in particular on areas that were not usually used for performance or even accessible by the public, such as corridors and offices - "Punchdrunk enabled us to look at the Old Town Hall Building with fresh eyes, seeing the potential in every room, corridor, stairwell and cupboard, opening up areas that had been shut away for years" (Battersea Arts Centre Website).

Locations within the venue included an opium den, a 19th-century French-inspired music hall ("The Palais Royale"), a library, perfumery, morgue, banqueting hall, bedrooms and a crypt.

== The Gold-Bug Hunt ==
The Gold-Bug Hunt was a game by interactive theatre-makers Coney that took place online, in the "real world", and within The Masque of the Red Death. It ran for six months, extending past the end date of the show itself. Participants initially discovered the game by interacting with a mysterious masked and hooded figure within the Palais Royale bar area of the show.

Coney transposed a mystery based on another Edgar Allan Poe short story, "The Gold-Bug", onto the narrative and locations used in The Masque of the Red Death, and took advantage of the fact that the Old Town Hall building dated back to 1893, 50 years after the publication of the story (treated as a factual account within the narrative), to weave fiction together with reality.

Like the story upon which it is based, the Gold-Bug hunt relied on the decryption of ciphers and puzzles to lead the participants to the "treasure", which was finally discovered by a group of participants buried in a garden within the confines of the Battersea Arts Centre, and upon which the Old Town Hall had been built. However, in order to reach this point, it was necessary for the participants to work together and interact with the sets, props, and at times the actors themselves, within The Masque of the Red Death show, as well as by solving puzzles online.
