= The Third Day (TV series) =

2020 Sky Atlantic and HBO TV series

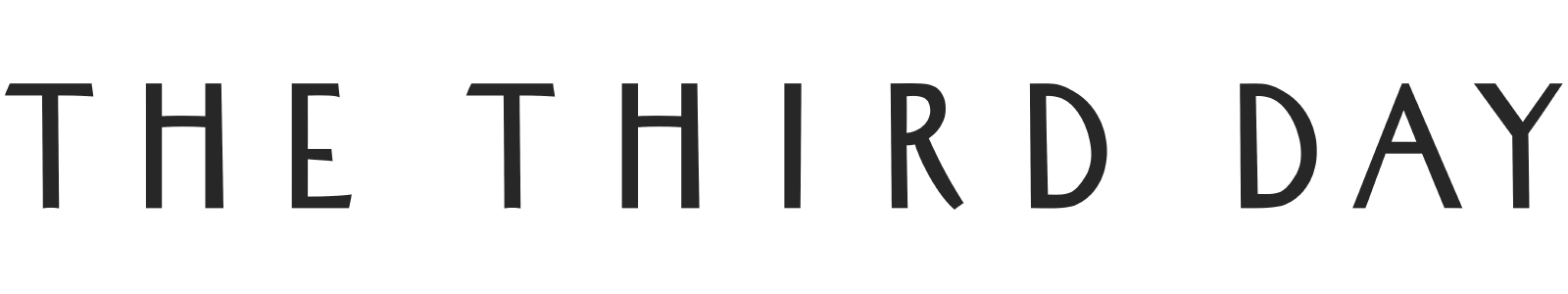
- Genre: Drama; Mystery; Thriller
- Created by: Felix Barrett; Dennis Kelly
- Starring: Jude Law; Katherine Waterston; John Dagleish; Mark Lewis Jones; Jessie Ross; Richard Bremmer; Paddy Considine; Emily Watson; Freya Allan; Börje Lundberg; Florence Welch; Paul Kaye; Naomie Harris; Nico Parker; Charlotte Gairdner-Mihell
- Composers: Cristobal Tapia de Veer; Stephen Dobbie; Dickon Hinchliffe
- Countries of origin: United Kingdom; United States
- Original language: English
- No. of episodes: 6 (+ 1 special)

Production
- Executive producers: Brad Pitt; Dede Gardner; Jeremy Kleiner; Dennis Kelly; Felix Barrett; Marc Munden; Kate Crowe; Philippa Lowthorpe
- Producers: Adrian Sturges; Gareth Collins
- Cinematography: Benjamin Kračun; Ole Birkeland; David Chizallet
- Editors: Nicolas Chaudeurge; Simon Smith; Dan Roberts; Luke Dunkley
- Running time: 57–61 minutes; 715 minutes (special)
- Production companies: Punchdrunk International; Plan B Entertainment; Sky Studios; Scott Free Productions

Original release
- Network: HBO; Sky Atlantic; Sky Arts (special)
- Release: September 14 – October 19, 2020

The Third Day is a drama-thriller television series created by Felix Barrett and Dennis Kelly for HBO and Sky Atlantic. The series premiered in the United States on 14 September 2020, on HBO, and in the United Kingdom on 15 September 2020, on Sky Atlantic.

== Premise ==
The series chronicles the individual journeys of a man and woman who arrive on a mysterious island at different times.

The production is split into three interconnected parts. The first, "Summer", directed by Marc Munden, follows Sam (played by Jude Law), a man drawn to a mysterious island off the English coast where he encounters a group of islanders set on preserving their traditions at any cost.

The second part of the production, "Autumn", was broadcast in the format of a 12-hour live event on the island, described by the producers of the show as a "major immersive theatre event". It was intended to allow followers of The Third Day to "inhabit the story as it happens". It features Jude Law and other members of the series cast. Part 2 also features singer Florence Welch.

The third part of the series, "Winter", directed by Philippa Lowthorpe, follows Helen (played by Naomie Harris), a strong-willed outsider who comes to the island seeking answers but whose arrival precipitates a fractious battle to decide its fate.

== Cast ==
=== Main ===
- Jude Law as Sam
- Katherine Waterston as Jess
- John Dagleish as Larry
- Mark Lewis Jones as Jason
- Jessie Ross as Epona
- Richard Bremmer as "The Father"
- Paddy Considine as Mr. Martin
- Emily Watson as Mrs. Martin
- Freya Allan as Kail
- Börje Lundberg as Professor Mimir
- Florence Welch as Veronica
- Paul Kaye as "The Cowboy"
- Naomie Harris as Helen
- Nico Parker as Ellie
- Charlotte Gairdner-Mihell as Talulah

=== Recurring ===
- Stanley Auckland as "Nathan"
- Will Rogers as Danny
- Amer Chadha-Patel as the preacher
- Lauren Byrne as Mya
- Tom Lawrence as Tomo
- Anna Calder-Marshall as Margaret
- George Potts as Alan
- Hilton McRae as Janny

== Episodes ==
No.	Title	Directed by	Written by	Original release date	U.S. viewers (millions)
Part 1: Summer
1	"Friday – The Father"	Marc Munden	Dennis Kelly	September 14, 2020	0.207
A man named Sam drives to the coast near Osea Island to participate in a personal ritual of grief over his son, who was murdered nine years before. His wife calls to tell him that £40,000 is missing from their office, money Sam needs to bribe an official who can help save their business. Sam hears crying in the woods and witnesses a young girl, Epona, attempt suicide by hanging, with the help of a mysterious younger boy. Sam rescues her and drives her across a periodically flooded causeway to Osea, where she asks to be taken to the pub, which is owned by the Martins. After Epona tells Sam there was no boy with her, Sam sees him again on the island, but the boy runs away. Events conspire to prevent Sam from leaving, so Mr Martin invites him to stay the night. That evening, Sam gets drunk with the locals and Jess, an American anthropologist visiting the island for the festival. He then finds the missing £40,000 in his car boot.
2	"Saturday – The Son"	Marc Munden	Dennis Kelly	September 21, 2020	0.183
Sam and Jess wake up in bed together and realize they had sex when they were drunk the night before. Sam tells Jess about his son Nathan's murder by a Romanian asylum seeker. He finds a drunken old man, Mimir, who has many newspaper clippings about the murder. Masked islanders chase and threaten Sam until Epona's father frightens them away with a shotgun blast and then threatens Sam with the gun, blaming him for the death of Epona's brother. Sam tells Jess that he is experiencing déjà vu on the island. He starts to drive over the causeway but changes his mind and decides to stay. During the festival rehearsal, Jess and Sam get high on LSD. Mrs Martin learns that Larry and his gang are coming after Sam because Larry saw Epona hug and kiss him. Mrs Martin quickly escorts him to a chapel where he can hide, but Larry finds Sam and hits him on the head, knocking him unconscious.
3	"Sunday – The Ghost"	Marc Munden	Dennis Kelly	September 28, 2020	0.144
After being involuntarily baptised by the Father of the island's bizarre religious cult, Sam learns from Mimir that he is a descendant of Osea's founder, Charrington, and the future Father of Osea. Refusing to take on this 'holy' role, he knocks out Larry, who is about to drown him, and escapes. He tries to leave the island on foot but is trapped by the tide and rescued by Jess, who asks him about the £40,000 she found under their sink. The Martins tell him that his son was kidnapped and is still alive. Sam calls their beliefs crazy and demands to leave the island. He chases the mysterious boy once again, which leads him to the chapel. Epona's dead body lies on the altar, her stomach cut open. Mrs Martin follows him inside with a shotgun and explains that Epona has sacrificed herself to heal Osea. Mrs Martin wants him dead so that Nathan can become the Father of Osea. Sam escapes from her and leaves the island on a boat with Jess. However, she drives the boat back to the dock, revealing that her daughters are being held hostage by the islanders, who are gathered at the pier. The Father welcomes Sam, thanks him, and shoots himself in the head. The crowd cheers, and Sam runs toward the Big House to meet Nathan.
Part 2: Autumn
Special	"Autumn"	Felix Barrett & Marc Munden	Felix Barrett & Kath Duggan & Emily Mytton (Note: With additional material by Dennis Kelly.)	October 3, 2020 (Note: The 12-hour special event aired on Sky Arts in the UK and on Facebook Live worldwide.)	–
It is the day of the festival "Esus and the Sea", an event which marks the passing into adulthood of the children of the island. A boy is chosen to take "The Path of Esus", a day-long trial that is meant to purify the world of all evil. Osea's new Father, Sam, also undergoes the trial to ensure that he is fit to lead the island and that it accepts him. Jess also attends.
Part 3: Winter
4	"Monday – The Mother"	Philippa Lowthorpe	Kit de Waal & Dean O'Loughlin and Dennis Kelly	October 5, 2020	0.106
Nine months after the events of the first three episodes, a woman named Helen arrives on Osea with her daughters Ellie and Talulah, who is called Lu. Helen has booked a holiday cottage for Ellie's birthday, but she discovers the island in disarray and her booking suspiciously unavailable. Despite being given warnings to leave before the causeway closes, she keeps trying to find a room. She bandages the head of the owner of the only hotel on the island, who has apparently been beaten and then panics when she sees Ellie talking to Larry. After several failed attempts to find accommodations, disturbing encounters with islanders, and the disappearance of their car, Helen and her girls end up at the pub. Weary, afraid, and desperate, Helen demands the Martins find her a place to stay. They explain that Helen's car was towed and give the family dinner. Once settled into their room upstairs, Lu turns on her tablet to play, but Helen takes it away and places it on the bedside table. The tablet's home screen displays a family photo of the two daughters, their mother, and their father: Sam.
5	"Tuesday – The Daughter"	Philippa Lowthorpe	Kit de Waal & Dean O'Loughlin and Dennis Kelly	October 12, 2020	0.167
Helen and her daughters are awakened by a scream. Downstairs is a disputatious crowd of islanders and a pregnant woman in pain: Jess. Helen, a former veterinarian, offers to help. She turns the baby, which is in a transverse position, so that it can be delivered. Helen asks Mr. Martin whether he has seen her husband, Sam, who has disappeared but whom Helen has heard is on the island. Mr, Martin lies, saying he has not seen him. Jess's daughter Kail approaches Ellie and Lu and tells Ellie that she can visit a place where the islanders practice their religion secretly. Jess disappears. Looking for her, Helen finds a drunken Janny, the hotelier whom she previously helped. He mentions having seen Sam, which sends her off to confront Mr. Martin in a rage. The Martins explain that they only wanted to hide his infidelity and that he left three months earlier after telling them he was going back to his wife. As Helen and her daughters are about to drive off the island, they spot Jess walking into the sea. They take her inside a cottage, and Helen helps her give birth to a baby girl. An ecstatic Jess asks Helen to go to the Big House and get Sam so that he can see his daughter. Helen tells her girls to stay with Jess, but Ellie goes off with Kail, who takes her to a cave carved with symbols and tells her about the history of Osea and that the founder, Carrington, was Jack the Ripper. Lu tells Jess that she had a brother named Nathan, whereupon Jess pulls out a knife and prepares to kill Lu, who escapes through a window and runs away.
6	"Last Day – The Dark"	Philippa Lowthorpe	Dennis Kelly	October 19, 2020	0.174
When Helen meets Sam, he tells her what he has been through and that Nathan is still alive. She follows Sam to the Big House only to discover that the boy, who is drawing disturbing pictures, is not Nathan since he is too young and the wrong color. Sam claims that the island is special, that he loves Helen, and that he wants his family together again, but she is furious, calls Sam a parasite, and demands he give her the money he took so that she and her girls can keep their home. Kail tells Ellie that her father is on the island and that her family should leave, but Jess orders their cars burned and the causeway closed. She prepares to take over the island so that her baby will become its leader. Jess's allies start to kill those who side with Sam, the Father of Osea. Jess tells Ellie that the baby is Ellie's sister and Mrs. Martin tells Helen that the man who murdered the real Nathan kidnapped him for the islanders. Mr. Martin is killed, while Jess tries to persuade Ellie that her family must stay on the island. When Ellie meets her parents, Sam apologizes to her and tells her that her brother is alive, infuriating Helen. Jess announces to the islanders that her daughter, named Epona, will be the Mother of Osea and that everyone will be safe, but she has Mrs. Martin killed and Sam and Helen taken to the pub, where Lu is hiding. Sam takes them to the hotel to rescue Ellie and to the chapel to rescue the boy called Nathan, killing their captors. He hands the bag of money over to Helen and tells her to leave with the girls at dawn. Helen does not wait for the causeway to open but leaves in the dark, swimming in icy water and towing the girls in a boat. The three of them make it successfully to the mainland as the morning breaks.

== Production ==
The series was commissioned in June 2019, with the announcement that Jude Law was cast in the lead role. Marc Munden was hired to direct the first three episodes, with Dennis Kelly writing. In July, Katherine Waterston, Paddy Considine and Emily Watson were added to the cast. Naomie Harris and John Dagleish were added in August, with Philippa Lowthorpe hired to direct the final three episodes of the series. Kit de Waal and Dean O'Loughlin also joined Kelly to co-write two episodes.

The series is set on Osea Island and its causeway. Filming began on the series in July 2019 in the United Kingdom in Essex and Kent. Production visited many locations in Kent for filming, including Fog Signal Station at Dungeness, Allens Farm, Harty Ferry Road near Harty Ferry Inn in Swale, Walpole Bay Tidal Pool, St Clere Estate, Bedgebury National Pinetum Forest, Hever Castle, Grain Coastal Park on the Isle of Grain, Chislehurst Caves and Shellness Beach on the Isle of Sheppey.

== Release ==
The series was initially set to premiere in the United States on HBO on 11 May 2020, and on Sky Atlantic on 12 May 2020. In April 2020, HBO and Sky pulled the series from the schedule due to post-production on the series being affected by the COVID-19 pandemic. It was subsequently rescheduled for a 14 September premiere in the U.S., and 15 September in the UK.

The first episodes of both the "Summer" and "Winter" parts premiered as part of the Primetime section of the 2020 Toronto International Film Festival on 11 September 2020.

The "Autumn" live event was broadcast live in the UK on Sky Arts and streamed for free via the Sky UK and HBO Facebook pages, on 3 October 2020.

== Reception ==
=== Critical response ===
For the miniseries, review aggregator Rotten Tomatoes reported an approval rating of 79% based on 48 reviews, with an average rating of 7.00/10. The website's critics consensus reads, "With a sufficiently arresting atmosphere and captivating performances from stars Jude Law and Naomie Harris, The Third Day is an intriguing—if overly familiar—addition to the folk-horror genre." Metacritic gave the miniseries a weighted average score of 70 out of 100 based on 16 critics, indicating "generally favorable reviews".

=== U.S. ratings ===
Viewership and ratings per episode of The Third Day
No.	Title	Air date	Rating (18–49)	Viewers (millions)	DVR (18–49)	DVR viewers (millions)	Total (18–49)	Total viewers (millions)
1	"Friday – The Father"	14 September 2020	0.02	0.207	TBD	TBD	TBD	TBD
2	"Saturday – The Son"	21 September 2020	0.02	0.183	TBD	TBD	TBD	TBD
3	"Sunday – The Ghost"	28 September 2020	0.04	0.144	TBD	TBD	TBD	TBD
4	"Monday – The Mother"	5 October 2020	0.01	0.106	TBD	TBD	TBD	TBD
5	"Tuesday – The Daughter"	12 October 2020	0.02	0.167	TBD	TBD	TBD	TBD
6	"Last Day – The Dark"	19 October 2020	0.03	0.174	TBD	TBD	TBD	TBD
