= McKitrick =

McKitrick is a surname. Notable people with the surname include:

- Annie McKitrick (born 1952), Canadian politician
- Eric McKitrick (1919–2002), American historian
- Jenifer McKitrick (born 1966), songwriter, screenwriter, musician
- Ross McKitrick (born 1965), Canadian economist

== See also ==
- McKittrick
