= McKitterick =

McKitterick is a surname. Notable people with the surname include:

- Christopher McKitterick (born 1967), American writer
- David McKitterick (born 1948), English librarian
- Rosamond McKitterick (born 1949), British historian

== See also ==
- McKitterick Prize, British literary prize
- McKittrick
