= McKittrick Hotel =

Performing arts venue in Manhattan, New York

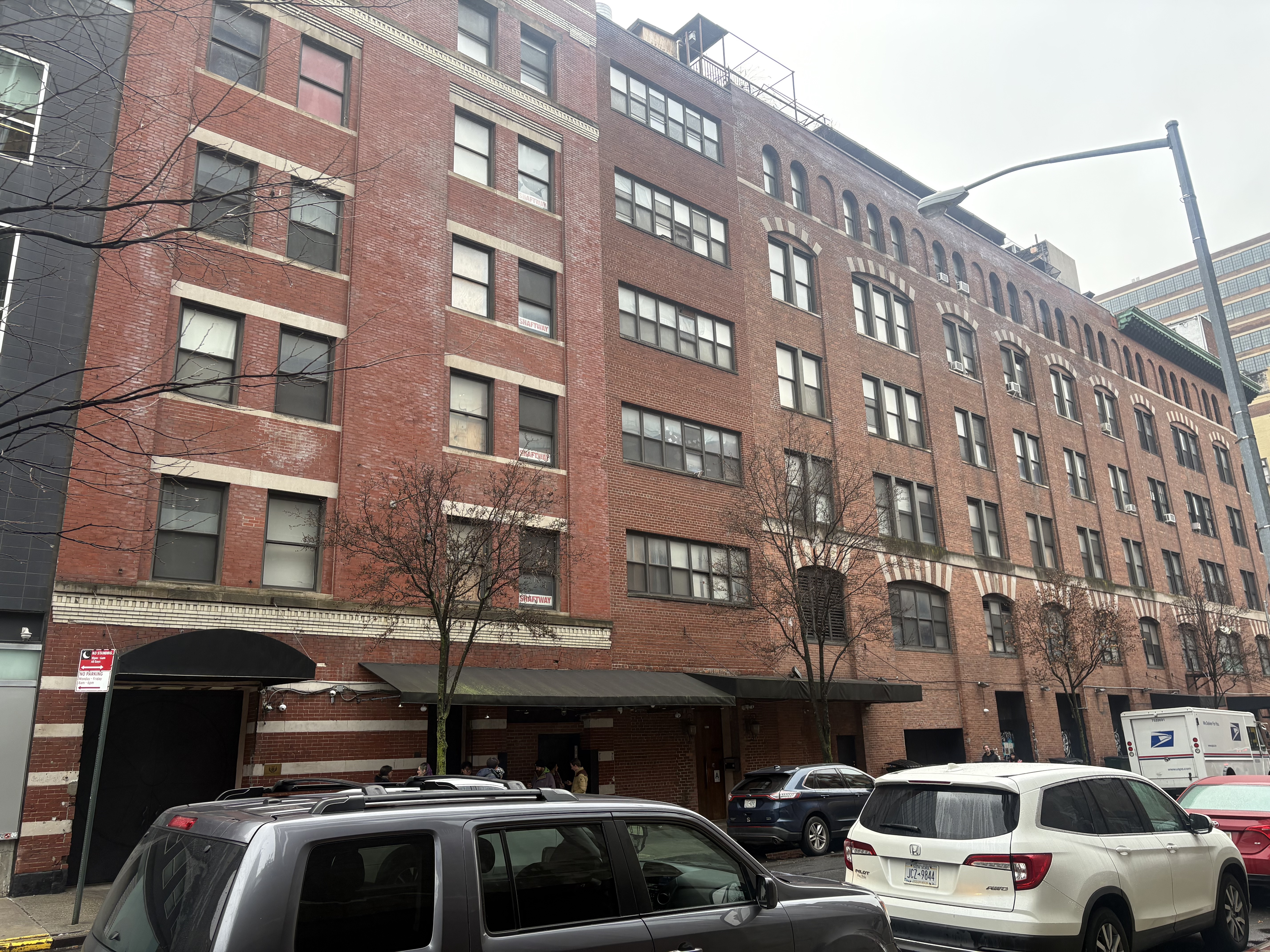
- Exterior of the McKittrick Hotel
- Interactive map of McKittrick Hotel
- Address: 530 West 27th Street; Manhattan, New York; United States
- Coordinates: 40°45′02″N 74°00′14″W

Construction
- Opened: 2011
- Closed: January 12, 2025

Website
- https://mckittrickhotel.com/

The McKittrick Hotel (also known as The McKittrick) was a performing arts venue themed as a 1930s hotel in the Chelsea neighborhood of Manhattan in New York City. It was located at 530 West 27th Street and was best known as the setting of the immersive theater production Sleep No More. It also featured a bar and dining space known as Gallow Green on the roof, a restaurant called the Club Car (originally called the Heath) on the sixth floor, and a bar called the Manderley on the second floor. In addition to Sleep No More, it was used as a venue for a number of parties, performances, and special events. It closed in January 2025 following the final performance of Sleep No More and a trio of farewell parties entitled APPARITIONS.

In August 2026, the venue reopened under new management as The Culture Club featuring multiple performance spaces.

== Location and theming ==
The McKittrick spanned roughly 100,000 square feet (9,300 square meters) across three adjoining warehouses. There were six stories and around a hundred rooms. This space was previously used as part of several nightclubs, including The Sound Factory, Twilo and Guesthouse, before its conversion into the McKittrick in 2011.

The McKittrick was never a real hotel, but Emursive, the producers of Sleep No More and many of the other events at the venue, have created a fictitious history for it. According to its official website, the McKittrick was built in 1939 to be New York's "most decadent" hotel but was shut down two days after the outbreak of World War II (six weeks before the hotel's scheduled opening). While not all areas of the venue reflect a hotel theming, they generally maintained a 1930s noir aesthetic. The venue's name is a reference to the Alfred Hitchcock film Vertigo.

== Programs and events ==
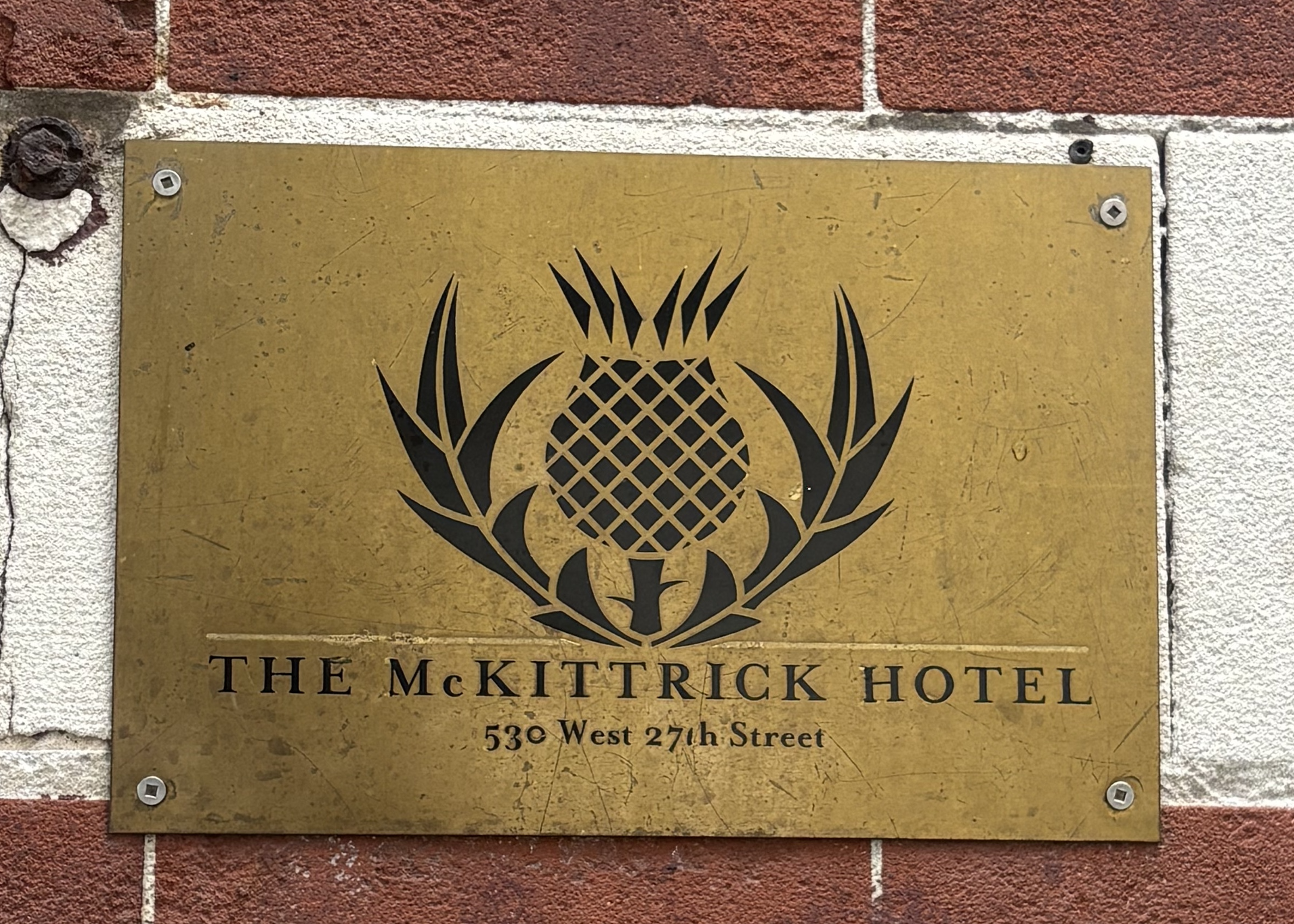
Exterior plaque for the McKittrick Hotel

The McKittrick was primarily used as the set for Sleep No More, a retelling of William Shakespeare's play Macbeth with additional elements from the Paisley witch trials and the films of Alfred Hitchcock. It spanned all six floors of the space and was known for its immersive elements and the distinctive masks that audience members wore during the performance. Sleep No More opened on March 7, 2011 and closed on January 5, 2025. It won numerous awards, including the 2011 Drama Desk Award for Unique Theatrical Experience and special citations for design and choreography for its production company Punchdrunk at the 2011 Obie Awards.

Additionally, the McKittrick hosted a wide range of limited-time events, including:

- Ghost Quartet, a musical song cycle by Dave Malloy, which premiered at the Bushwick Starr in 2014 and transferred to the McKittrick from January to May 2015.
- Hypnotique, a burlesque show.
- The Strange Undoing of Prudencia Hart, a production of David Greig's musical, in partnership with the National Theater of Scotland. It ran from November 2016 to April 23, 2017 in the Heath.
- SuperCinema, a series of parties inspired by movies such as Clue and The Great Gatsby.
- Bartschland Follies (also known as the McKittrick Follies or simply the Follies), a late-night show headed by Susanne Bartsch involving a mix of cabaret and burlesque.
- Inferno, a Halloween-themed party.
- The Lost Supper – A Hypnotic Dinner Party, a mixture of dining and cabaret performance, featuring actors in animal masks. It ran in a part of the Heath called the Attic in 2018 and closed on September 9 of that year.
- At the Illusionist's Table, a combination dining and magic performance designed, had a number of runs at the McKittrick.
- Sleep No More: Salon Series, discussion sections following performances of Sleep No More. Salons were typically discussions between Emursive Chief Storyteller Ilana Gilovich and two members of the Sleep No More production team, followed by audience Q&A.
- Sleep No More: Roundtable Series, audience talkbacks typically preceding Sleep No More performances.
- Speakeasy Magick, a magic show featuring a number of performers, each with a ten minute act. This was later moved from the McKittrick to the nearby Overlook Bar.
- APPARITIONS, a three-night series of parties running from January 9–11, 2025 to bid farewell to the New York production of Sleep No More and the McKittrick.

There were also various concerts and parties for other holidays and events.

Since the closing of Sleep No More, the building has hosted several events, including a two-night revival of the Twilo nightclub in its original location in March 2026. It has also played host to Off-Broadway productions as a multi-theater venue known as "The Culture Club". Productions include Heated Rivalry: The Unauthorized Musical Parody in the former Heath/Club Car space and the musical adaptation of Memoirs of Amorous Gentlemen on the ground floor, named "The Night Egg at the Culture Club."

== Spaces ==
The McKittrick consisted of three main spaces: the Manderley bar, the Sleep No More set, and the combination of the Club Car and Gallow Green, which spanned the top floor and the rooftop.

=== The Manderley ===
Upon entering the venue and passing the coat check, guests ascended a flight of stairs to the second floor and passed through a dark maze to reach the Manderley. Named after the estate in the novel Rebecca (upon which the Hitchcock film is based), the bar featured two connected rooms – one with the bar and a performance area and another further back with additional seating. During performances of Sleep No More, the area around the stage was roped off for those who had paid for premium entry. The performance area often featured live music appropriate for the 1930s theming, including covers of modern pop songs.

In addition to its use during performances of Sleep No More and other events such as the Follies, the Manderley sometimes functioned as a normal bar open to the public.

=== Sleep No More set ===
The majority of the McKittrick was taken up by the set of Sleep No More, which spans all six floors. Guests entered on the first floor and after "checking in," were brought up to the Manderley bar. They were then given access to the performance area via elevator or stairwell. The space consisted of:

- Floor 1 – The McKittrick Hotel Ballroom, with a large dance area and mezzanine above, in addition to smaller rooms including a small crypt, a chapel, and a bedroom belonging to Duncan.
- Floor 2 – The McKittrick Hotel Lobby, including a check-in desk, phone booths, a luggage area, and a dining area. There was also access from this area to the Manderley.
- Floor 3 – The McKittrick Hotel Residences, including a number of rooms themed as living areas for the Macbeths and MacDuffs as well as a cemetery.
- Floor 4 – The High Street of Gallow Green, a fictional small town in Glamis, Scotland. It consisted of a speakeasy bar, a number of storefronts, an interrogation room, and a distorted replica of the Manderley. The storefronts included a detective agency belonging to Malcolm, a taxidermist, a tailor, a mortician, an apothecary, and a sweets shop.
- Floor 5 – The King James Sanatorium, featuring a number of patient beds, a room with bathtubs, a maze-like garden with a small hut, an operating theater, a padded cell, and a nurse's office.

Part of the sixth floor was a dedicated performance space inspired by the Manderley estate in Rebecca, but this area could only be reached via a specific interaction with one of the cast members.

The set was also used for other events at the McKittrick, including many of its parties.

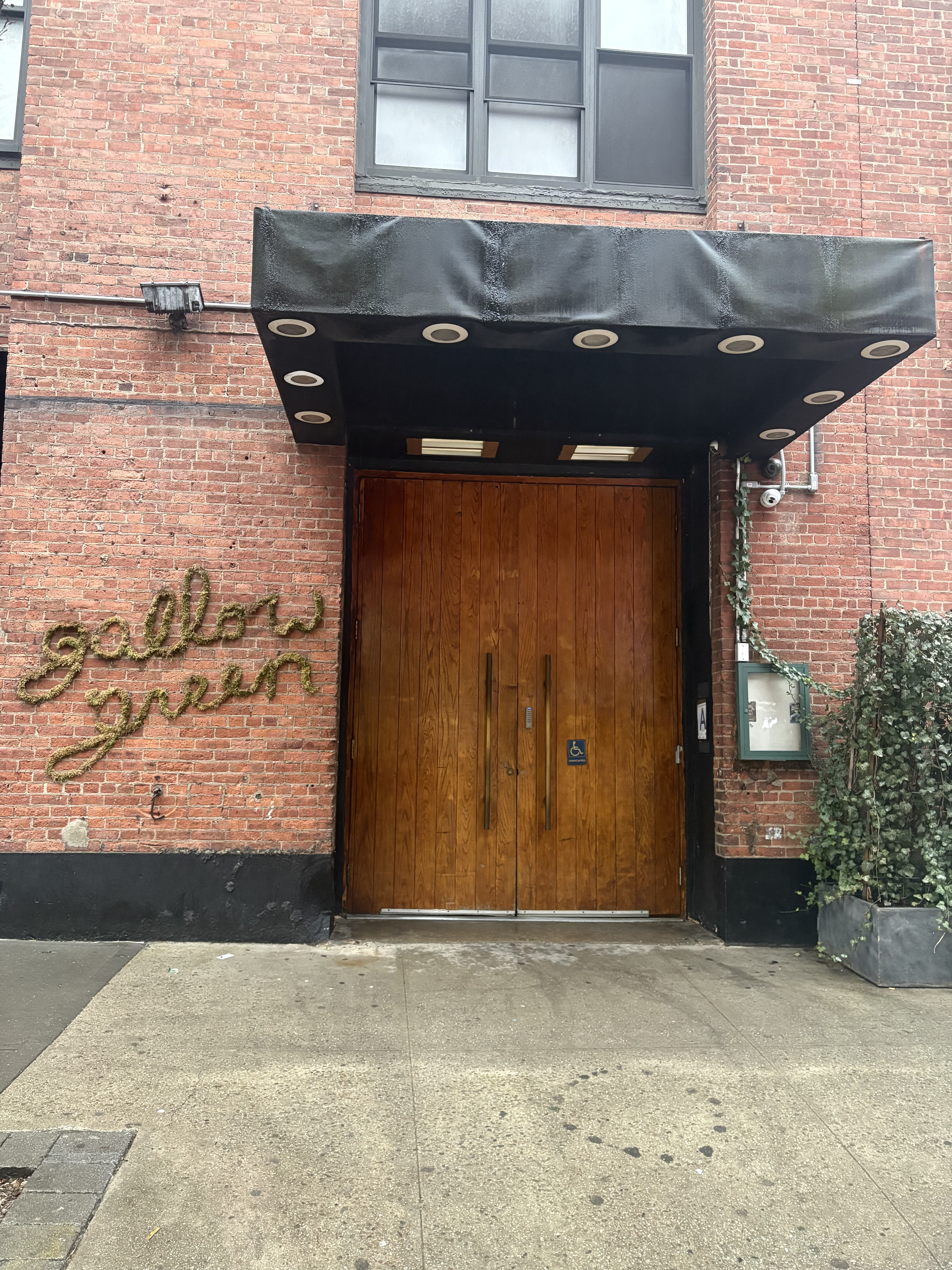
Exterior of entrance to Gallow Green

=== The Club Car and Gallow Green ===
The sixth floor of the building housed the Club Car, a restaurant made to resemble a 1930s train car. It was originally named the Heath, a reference to the setting of several scenes in Macbeth involving the witches. It was later renamed the Club Car to better reflect its theming. The small indoor entrance to the sixth floor represented the train stop in a station, with a period advertisement board, train schedule, and newspaper booth. The Club Car operated as a full-service restaurant and included a stage area.

Gallow Green was a rooftop bar, with theming varying depending on the season. In the summer, it featured a garden theme with lots of plants and open air. In the winter, it was sometimes referred to as "The Lodge at Gallow Green" and included pine trees, yurts, open fires, and spiced wine. The name Gallow Green is a reference to the Paisley witch trials.

== See also ==
- Sleep No More
- Punchdrunk
