= The Drowned Man =

Original theatre production

The Drowned Man: A Hollywood Fable
- Original language: English
- Written by: Punchdrunk (directed by Felix Barrett and Maxine Doyle)

Premiere
- Date: June 20, 2013
- Place: 31 London St, London; United Kingdom
- Official website

The Drowned Man was an original theatre production by British theatre company Punchdrunk, in collaboration with the Royal National Theatre.

== Overview ==
Set within the fictional "Temple Pictures", The Drowned Man was Punchdrunk's largest theatre installation, covering 200,000 sq ft., catering for up to 600 audience members per show with a cast of nearly 40. The production fell within several genres of theatre, including so-called site-specific theatre, promenade theatre, interactive theatre or immersive theatre. The audience members were free to roam around the sets at will, wearing white masks to distinguish themselves from the cast, and the narrative was communicated through a series of overlapping scenes blending the mediums of interpretive dance, contemporary dance and traditional acting. The show opened June 2013 and tickets ran until 6 July 2014.

== Temple Pictures ==
Temple Pictures was the name of the fictional Hollywood film studio which formed the setting and backdrop of the production. It was physically located at 31 London Street, London, next to Paddington Station, occupying four floors of the building that had previously been a Royal Mail sorting office. It was described within the fiction as the British outpost of major Hollywood studio Republic Pictures around the time period of the 1960s. The various sets and locations within the building represented internal and external locations both within Temple Pictures and also the outskirts of the town near which it was situated. The various locations included a desert, a saloon, a trailer park, a chapel, as well as several dressed sound stages and a Lynchian black and white chequerboard dancefloor. As in previous Punchdrunk shows, the audience was free to roam around and explore the sets in their own way, and the intricate detailing of the props and locations assisted the audience in picking up the threads of the narrative. A virtual tour has been crafted using thousands of photographs of Temple Studios, managing to capture the set in all of its intricate detail.

== Narrative ==
Creative director Felix Barrett noted that The Drowned Man was "the first time that we've played with the idea of more than one lead narrative". The two main narratives formed mirrors of each other, one following the story of a couple within Temple Studios and the other a couple living on the outskirts of the Hollywood town. The main characters played out a tragic love story, with the numerous supporting characters embellishing the detail of that story as well as having some independent side-stories of their own. Many aspects of the narrative were influenced by Georg Buchner's unfinished play Woyzeck, including the main themes of murder, madness and adultery. However, the work also drew on several other sources for inspiration, including Nathanael West's (1939) novel The Day of the Locust and Ray Bradbury's (1962) novel Something Wicked This Way Comes.

== Critical reception ==
Professional ratings
Review scores
Source	Rating
The Independent	3/5 stars
The Daily Telegraph	5/5 stars
The Financial Times	5/5 stars
The London Evening Standard	4/5 stars
Time Out	3/5 stars

Several reviews complimented the scale of the production and the ambitious use of multiple narratives, while also commenting that the scale could at times make the experience feel fragmented and difficult to follow. The majority of official media reviews were written at the beginning of the show's run in June 2013, and as a result several changes were made to improve the audience's understanding of the story, including handing out slips of paper with a brief outline of the plot at the start. Time Out magazine awarded the production 3 out of 5 stars, commenting that "as pure spectacle, Punchdrunk are now operating on a level that makes criticism basically redundant. But in terms of straight-up theatre, they have made better". The Independent commented "For all its logistical flair the show is lacking in heart", awarding it 3 out of 5 stars The London Evening Standard gave it 4 out of 5 stars, commenting "abandon all preconceptions of what theatre should be and prepare yourself for a multi-storey treat" The Daily Telegraph awarded it 5 out 5 stars, asserting that "the masters of immersive theatre have returned with a show that will surely become a cult hit" The Financial Times called it "Thrilling - Punchdrunk’s newest ‘immersive’ piece is seedy, frightening and feels supremely alive", awarding it 5 out of 5 stars.

== Credits ==
Creative team	Role
Felix Barrett	director/designer
Maxine Doyle	director/choreographer
Livi Vaughn	designer
Beatrice Minns	designer
Mike Gunning	lighting designer
Stephen Dobbie	sound designer
Jack Galloway	costume designer
Magnus Fiennes	music director and composer
John Van der Put	illusionist
Hector Harkness	associate director
Conor Doyle	associate choreographer
Fernanda Prata	rehearsal director/associate choreographer
