= Sleep No More (2009 play) =

2009 play by Punchdrunk

- Written by: Felix Barrett and Maxine Doyle, with the Company
- Characters: Duncan, Malcolm, Macbeth, Banquo, Macduff, Porter, Lady Macbeth, Lady Macduff, Male Witch, Two Female Witches, Hecate, The Second Mrs. de Winter, Mrs. Danvers, Bellhop/Taxidermist. Speakeasy Bartender, Man in Bar, Annie Darcy, Elsie Price, The Annie Darcy Band
- Mute: most of the characters
- Original language: English
- Series: The Donkey Show, Best of Both Worlds
- Setting: Scotland, Manderley manor

Premiere
- Date premiered: October 8, 2009
- Place premiered: Old Lincoln School, Brookline, Massachusetts; United States
- Official website

Sleep No More is an immersive theatre production created by British theatre company Punchdrunk. Based on Punchdrunk's original 2003 London production, the company reinvented Sleep No More in a co-production with the American Repertory Theater (A.R.T.), which opened at the Old Lincoln School in Brookline, Massachusetts on October 8, 2009. It won Punchdrunk the Elliot Norton Award for Best Theatrical Experience 2010.

== Overview ==
The production was a new and expanded version of Punchdrunk's 2003 production of the same name which was performed in the Beaufoy Building, London, a disused Victorian school. Unlike a conventional stage play, Sleep No More is an immersive experience in which audiences are free to explore the world of the performance at will. It combined plot and characters of Shakespeare's Macbeth with characters, narrative, and aesthetic elements inspired by the films of Hitchcock, in particular Rebecca, an adaptation of the novel of the same name by English author Daphne du Maurier.

=== Relationship to Macbeth ===
Assistant director Paul Stacey says that "every line of Shakespeare's Macbeth is embedded in the multiple languages—sound, light, design, and dance—of Sleep No More."

=== Characters ===
There were 18 characters in the 2009 production of Sleep No More, most of them taken directly from Shakespeare's Scottish tragedy, Macbeth.

=== Immersion of audience ===
Audience members are invited to explore the world of the production in their own time, choosing for themselves what to watch and where to go.

Unlike a conventional play, in which all audience members share the experience of witnessing the same events on the same stage, Sleep No More provides the audience with a more fragmented, multi-layered and individualized experience. As directors Felix Barrett and Maxine Doyle say in the program notes, "exploring the space individually, the audience is given the opportunity to both act in and direct their own film; to revisit, to edit and to indulge themselves as voyeurs."

=== Absence of dialogue ===
Though the plot is driven forward by events and interactions, Punchdrunk has developed a unique physical performance language in which there is almost no speaking by the performers. In describing Sleep No More, the directors write that "Screen dialogues become intense physical duets between characters and the body becomes the site of debate. Spoken words rarely find their way into our world; we are excited by the human body as a primary source of emotive storytelling."

== Old Lincoln School ==
The venue for Sleep No More was the surplus Old Lincoln School at 194 Boylston Street (Route 9) in Brookline, Massachusetts. The complex and overlapping subplots unfolded across 44 rooms on all four stories of the school building.

== Credits ==
Sleep No More is directed and devised by Felix Barrett and Maxine Doyle, with the company.

- Felix Barrett....Director and Designer
- Maxine Doyle....Director and Choreographer
- Stephen Dobbie....Sound and Graphic Designer
- Livi Vaughan....Associate Designer
- Beatrice Minns....Associate Designer
- David Israel Reynoso....Costumer (Costume Designer)
- Mikhael Tara Garver....Staff Director
- Paul Stacey....Assistant Director
- Carolyn Rae Boyd....Stage Manager

=== Cast (October 8 - November 8) ===
- Phil Atkins as Duncan
- Hector Harkness as Malcolm
- Geir Hytten as Macbeth
- Vinicius Salles as Banquo
- Robert McNeill as Macduff
- Thomas Kee as Porter
- Sarah Dowling as Lady Macbeth
- Alli Ross as Lady Macduff
- Conor Doyle as Witch
- Stephanie Eaton as Witch
- Fernanda Prata as Witch
- Careena Melia as Hecate
- Poornima Kirby as The Second Mrs. de Winter
- Tori Sparks as Mrs. Danvers
- Alexander LaFrance as Bellhop/Taxidermist
- Deo Azben as Speakeasy Bartender
- Annie Goodchild as Annie Darcy
- Hayley Jane Soggin as Elsie Price
- Robert Najarian as Man in Bar

=== Cast (from November 10) ===
- Phil Atkins as Duncan
- Robert Najarian as Malcolm
- Eric Jackson-Bradley as Macbeth
- Jeffery Lyon as Banquo
- Luke Murphy as Macduff
- Thomas Kee as Porter
- Tori Sparks as Lady Macbeth
- Alli Ross as Lady Macduff
- Jordan Morley as Witch
- Stephanie Eaton as Witch
- Kelly Bartnik as Witch
- Careena Melia as Hecate
- Poornima Kirby as The Second Mrs. de Winter
- Hope T. Davis as Mrs. Danvers
- Alexander LaFrance as Bellhop/Taxidermist
- Deo Azben as Speakeasy Bartender
- Annie Goodchild as Annie Darcy
- Hayley Jane Soggin as Elsie Price
- Matt Spano as Charlie, Man in Bar

=== The Annie Darcy Band ===
- Bass/Sax....Timo Shanko
- Drums....Django Carranza
- Piano....Rusty Scott

== Sleep No More and the ART ==
Sleep No More was presented as part of the ART's Shakespeare Exploded! festival, which included The Donkey Show, a disco adaptation of A Midsummer Night's Dream, and Best of Both Worlds, an R&B/gospel musical inspired by The Winter's Tale.

== Production dates ==
Though the production was to run from October 8, 2009 to January 3, 2010, the run was extended through February 7, 2010. The extended run sold out. Sleep No More won Punchdrunk the Elliot Norton Award for Outstanding Theatrical Experience 2010.

=== Reviews ===
- Encore Magazine review
- Boston Globe reviews 1 2
- Harvard Crimson review
- Broookline Tab review
- The Guardian review
- Variety review

== See also ==
- Site-specific theatre
- Postmodern theatre
