= Paisley witches =

1697 witch trial

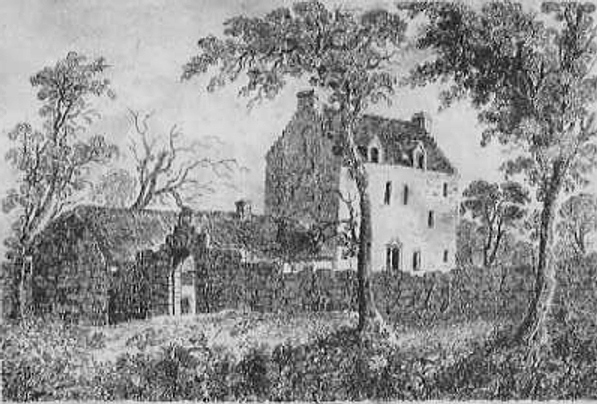
Bargarran House, home of Christian Shaw

The Paisley witches, also known as the Bargarran witches or the Renfrewshire witches, were tried in Paisley, Renfrewshire, central Scotland, in 1697. Eleven-year-old Christian Shaw, daughter of the Laird of Bargarran, complained of being tormented by some local witches; they included one of her family's servants, Katherine Campbell, whom she had reported to her mother after witnessing her steal a drink of milk.

Seven people – Margaret Lang, John Lindsay, James Lindsay, John Lindsay of Barloch, Katherine Campbell, Margaret Fulton, and Agnes Naismith – were found guilty of having bewitched Shaw and were condemned to death. They were hanged then burned on the Gallow Green in Paisley on 10 June 1697, the last mass execution for witchcraft in western Europe.

Agnes Naismith cursed everyone present at her trial and their descendants, and for many years afterwards every tragedy in Paisley was blamed on her curse. Christian Shaw went on to become a successful business owner and manufacturer of thread.

== Events ==
On 17 August 1696, 11-year-old Christian Shaw, the daughter of a local landowner, John Shaw of Bargarran, saw one of her family's servants, Catherine Campbell, steal a drink of milk. Shaw reported the theft to her mother, whereupon Campbell cursed her, wishing that the Devil would "haul her soul through Hell". Four days later Shaw encountered Agnes Naismith, an old woman reputed to be a witch. The following day, 22 August, Shaw became violently ill with fits, similar to the symptoms reported a few years earlier in the American Salem witch trials of 1693. After eight weeks Shaw's parents took her to see the eminent Glasgow physician Matthew Brisbane, who could find no cause for her symptoms. For eight days after her visit Shaw seemed to have recovered, but then "the fits returned with increased violence. She would become as stiff as a corpse and be senseless and motionless".

Shaw's parents took her back to Dr Brisbane, and by the time they arrived back in Glasgow she had begun to pull out of her mouth balls of hair she claimed had been put there by those who were afflicting her. Soon she began to pull other "trash" out of her mouth, including straw, coal, gravel, chicken feathers, and cinders. During her fits she was sometimes heard to be talking to the invisible Catherine Campbell, pleading for a return to their former friendship.

With Brisbane unable to provide any rational explanation for Shaw's condition her family and their local parish minister concluded that she must be possessed and being tormented by witches, which was believed to be a common occurrence in England and Scotland and a central element in the Salem witch trials a few years earlier. The church set up a weekly fast and prayer meeting at Bargarron House, and Shaw's father appealed to the authorities that those named by his daughter as tormenting her should be arrested. She had initially identified only Catherine Campbell and Agnes Naismith, but as time wore on she implicated others, and eventually 35 were accused. Ten were male and twenty female; the sexes and identities of the remaining five are unknown.

== Investigation and trial ==
At the request of the Presbytery of Paisley the Scottish Privy Council set up a commission to investigate the case. Under the chairmanship of Lord Blantyre, the hearing opened on 5 February 1697. The commission's task was to decide whether there was a prima facie case against those accused by Shaw before they were committed for trial.

Seven were subsequently summoned to appear before a second commission in Paisley: Margaret Lang, John Lindsay, James Lindsay, John Reid, Catherine Campbell, Margaret Fulton, and Agnes Naismith. They were charged with murder and tormenting a number of people, including Christian Shaw. Their advocate, James Roberston, argued that the prosecution was obliged to rule out the possibility that the events surrounding the case could be explained by natural causes before a conviction could be safely secured. Matthew Brisbane gave evidence stating that he had been unable to find any such cause for Shaw's condition. James Hutchison, the minister of Kilallan, about 5 miles (8.0 km) north of Paisley, delivered a sermon to the commission; it was commonplace at the time for a member of the clergy to preach to the court in Scottish witch trials, and they were not infrequently instrumental in securing convictions. Hutchison placed great store on the presence of witches' marks on the bodies of the accused, and cast doubt on the natural explanations of those marks offered by some physicians: "And however doctors may say such and such things of it [a witches' mark], we know not upon what ground. It may be that they have been budded and bribed to say such things".

The jury, confronted by a threat from the prosecutor that if they acquitted the defendants they would be "accessory to all the blasphemies, apostacies, murders, tortures, and seductions, etc., whereof those enemies of heaven and earth shall hereafter be guilty when they get out", found all seven of the accused guilty.

== Executions ==
One of those convicted, John Reid was found dead in his cell a few weeks (Saturday, 22 May, 1697) before the execution was to take place. He had a neckcloth tied around his neck and attached to the fireplace by a stick, however he was in a seated position on a stool, and those who found him stated the mechanism by which he had died was not sturdy enough to support his weight. With his cell locked, and window boarded, it was unclear how his death was accomplished The remaining seven were hanged and then burned on the Gallow Green in Paisley on 10 June 1697 the last mass execution for witchcraft in western Europe. John and James Lindsay, brothers, held each other's hands as they were hanged together. Katherine Campbell, after having been carried struggling and screaming to the gallows, "called down the wrath of God and the Devil on her accusers" before being despatched. Margaret Fulton appeared to have become insane, and "spoke cheerfully about visits to Elfland and the Abode of the Fairies on the backs of magical horses". Margaret Lang admitted to consorting with the Devil, but said that she had renounced sin and was reconciled with God. Agnes Naismith laid a "dying woman's curse" on everyone present and their descendants; for many years afterwards every tragedy in the town was blamed on "the witches' curse".

One account of the executions states that some of the condemned were still alive when their bodies were burned, and that the executioners borrowed a walking stick from an onlooker with which to push their victims' moving limbs back into the fire; its owner, Mark Canavan, refused to take it back after it had been in contact with witches.

== Modern interpretation ==
The anxiety induced in Christian Shaw by Katherine Campbell's curse may have brought on a conversion disorder in the young girl, the modern name for what was once known as hysteria. The term "conversion" derives from Sigmund Freud's idea that anxiety can be converted into physical symptoms such as the seizures displayed by Shaw.

Michael Wasser has commented that witch trials tended to occur at times of crisis such as Scotland experienced during the late 1690s. The Glorious Revolution of 1688, although it had restored the "Presbyterian polity of the kirk", nevertheless left many "disappointed at the low moral tone and lack of religious enthusiasm of their compatriots". The Glencoe Massacre of 1692 and the subsequent inquiry had "eroded the moral legitimacy of the government", and a series of harvest failures from 1695 onwards led to a period of famine. There was also the threat of a French invasion: "as the Bargarran witches were being tried, taxes and troops were being levied in the west to repel the expected invaders".

In 1839 a small hole was discovered in the wall of Shaw's bedroom at Bargarran House, which by then had become a local attraction, through which an accomplice may have passed the items she supposedly removed from her mouth.

== Documents ==
The Bargarran manuscript describing the case is kept in the Mitchell Library, Glasgow. Historian George Neilson, who procured the manuscript on behalf of city librarian Francis Thornton Barrett described its provenance in an article in The Scottish Historical Review in 1910. "That the book was originally the property of the Shaw family seems open to little doubt." In particular, he suggests that it belonged to Christian's father, John Shaw.

== Aftermath ==
Shortly after the trial in 1697 the former Scottish Secretary of State James Johnstone observed that "the parliaments of France and other judicatories who are persuaded of the being of witches never try them now because of the experience they have had that it's impossible to distinguish possession from nature in disorder".

Shaw married the Reverend John Millar, the parish minister of Kilmaurs, Ayrshire, in 1719. He died two years later, after which Shaw went on to become a successful businesswoman. She was involved in the manufacture of thread, at first in a small way, but as the quality of her product began to be recognised, on an increasingly large scale. Her Bargarran trademark thread became a mark of quality, and others in the area began to emulate her techniques, starting an industry in which Paisley once dominated the world, and which shaped the town's history. The last known record of Shaw is her marriage in February 1737 to William Livingstone, a prosperous Edinburgh businessman.

== Tribute ==
In May 2008 a memorial was built at Maxwellton Cross in Paisley, the site where the witches' charred remains were buried. It replaced the original horseshoe marking the spot, which had disappeared during the 1970s, as had its replacement later. The bronze tondo, with a stainless steel horseshoe embedded in it, includes the inscription "Pain Inflicted, Suffering Endured, Injustice Done". A campaign was launched in 2008 petitioning the Scottish Parliament to pardon all the 4000 men, women and children prosecuted under the 16th and 17th-century witchcraft laws, but legislators argued that it was inappropriate to pardon those tried and convicted under the laws of their time.
