= Christian Shaw =

Witch accuser and thread manufacturer (c. 1685 – 1737)

- Born: Christian Shaw; 1685; Renfrewshire, Scotland
- Died: 8 September 1737 (aged 51–52); Bargarran, Scotland
- Other name: Christian Miller
- Occupations: Textile industrialist, industrial spy
- Known for: founding thread industry in Renfrewshire giving evidence in the Bargarran witch trials
- Spouses: Rev John Millar (m. 1718; died 1721) William Gillespie (m. 1737)

Christian Shaw (1685 – 8 September 1737) was a Scottish industrialist regarded as the founder of the thread industry in Renfrewshire. As a child, she was instrumental in the Bargarran witch trials of 1697.

== Early life ==
Christian Shaw was born in Renfrewshire, Scotland in 1685 the daughter of Christian McGilchrist and John Shaw, the Laird of Bargarran. Little is known about Shaw's early life until the age of 11, when she becomes widely documented as a witness in the Bargarran witch trials.

== Bargarran witch trials ==
Christian Shaw is most documented for her role in the Bargarran witch trials, which took place in 1697. Shaw, then aged 11, accused over 20 people of witchcraft, 7 of whom were later hanged then burned. The executed included: Katherine Campbell, Agnes Naismith, Margaret Lang, Margaret Fulton, John Lindsay of Barloch (who was a tenant farmer of the Shaws), John Lindsay (alias Bishop), and his brother James Lindsay (alias Curate)

Accounts of the trials reported that Shaw had been "betwitched" by the suspects and was exhibiting behaviours including flying, and "vomiting coal and bent pins". During the investigations, which were led by Paisley Minister Mr Blackwood, the presbytery ordered prayer and fasting with the victim (Christian Shaw). Seven of those accused were hanged as a result of the trials, three men and four women.

An alternative account suggests that Shaw had taken a dislike to a servant, Katherine Campbell, and intentionally feigned bewitchment in order to bring about her death, and that her testimony led to the execution of 24 individuals in her home parish of Erskine.

== Bargarran thread ==
Shaw founded the Renfrewshire thread industry, introducing the spinning of fine linen thread to Scotland and the development of her own "Bagarran Thread".

Shaw married Rev John Miller, the minister of Kilmaurs on 8 September 1718. After his death in 1721 she returned to the family thread business, travelling with her mother to Holland, where both women observed Dutch spinning techniques. Shaw sketched the thread production process that she saw, and is said to have smuggled some associated machinery back to Scotland in her luggage. The new production methods resulted in a more durable whiter thread, and Shaw established a small thread manufacturing company, "The Bargarran Thread Company", in Johnstone on her return.

The Bargarran Thread was, by the 1720s, seen to be a mark of quality in thread, and was advertised as the product of "Lady Bargarran and her Daughters".

== Later life ==
Shaw spent increasing amounts of time in Edinburgh from the 1720s onwards, and was based in Leith. She established a spinning school in the city, taking donations that were distributed to trainee girls.

Shaw married William Gillespie, a glove manufacturer, in Edinburgh in 1737. She died on 8 September 1737, and is buried in Grey Friars Kirk, Edinburgh.
