= Punchdrunk (theatre company) =

British arts and entertainment company

- Type: Theatre company
- Industry: Arts & Entertainment
- Founded: 2000
- Founder: Felix Barrett
- Headquarters: Woolwich, London, United Kingdom
- Website: punchdrunk.com

Punchdrunk is a British theatre company formed in 2000 by Felix Barrett.

The company developed a form of immersive theatre in which no audience member will have the same experience as another. The audience is free to choose what to watch and where to go. The format is related to promenade theatre, but uses audience immersion more extensively. The company has been recognised for its unique uses of sound, light, movement and environment.

== Theatrical style ==
In a typical Punchdrunk production, audience members are free to roam the performance site, which can be as large as a five-story industrial warehouse. They can either follow the performers and themes (there are usually multiple threads at any instant), or simply explore the world of the performance, treating the production as a large art installation.

Masks are another signature element of Punchdrunk's work. Barrett says when the company "...introduced masks, suddenly inhibition fell away and people found a sense of freedom in their anonymity, allowing them to fully explore their surroundings and become totally absorbed in the world around them."

Former Secretary of State for Culture James Purnell cited Punchdrunk as an example of "access and excellence" in modern British theatre.

== Related organizations ==
=== Punchdrunk Enrichment ===
In 2008, Punchdrunk founded a new branch of the company focused on outreach to communities and schools called Punchdrunk Enrichment. Punchdrunk Enrichment projects are mostly aimed at children and young people. Established as a separate company in 2016, and now operates as an independent charity.

== Punchdrunk productions ==
- The Cherry Orchard (2000), based on the play by Anton Chekhov
- The Moonslave (2000), an experience that saw single audience members taken to an old mansion house by a masked chauffeur, following candlelit paths through a dense forest where the story unraveled.
- The House of Oedipus (2000), an adaptation of Oedipus Rex and Antigone by Sophocles, staged in the garden of Poltimore House, Devon.
- Midsummer Night's Dream (2002), an interactive, promenade reworking of the Shakespeare classic set in a private house and garden.
- Chair (2002), an adaptation of Eugène Ionesco's The Chairs, performed in the Old Seager Distillery in Deptford.
- The Tempest (2003), an adaptation of the play by Shakespeare, again performed at the Old Seagar Distillery, using its five floors to create a dark vision of Prospero's island.
- Sleep No More (2003); see below for the 2009, 2011, 2016, and 2025 reinventions. An adaptation of Shakespeare's Macbeth in the style of a Hitchcock thriller, using reworked music from the soundtrack of classic Hitchcock films. Staged at the Beaufoy Building in London, an old Victorian school.
- Woyzeck (2004), an adaptation of the play by Georg Buchner. Performed at the Big Chill Music Festival.
- Marat/Sade (2005), an adaptation of the play by Peter Weiss. Performed at the 2005 Big Chill Music Festival.
- The Firebird Ball (2005), inspired by Shakespeare's Romeo and Juliet and Stravinsky's ballet The Firebird. Staged at Offley Works, a disused factory in South London. The Firebird Ball ran for six weeks and received The Observer Review of the Year award for Best Out-of-Theatre Experience.
- Faust (10 October 2006 until 31 March 2007), an adaptation of Goethe's Faust Part One, relocated to a small town in the 1950s Midwest. Staged across 150,000 sq ft (14,000 m^{2}) of a derelict 5-storey archive building at 21 Wapping Lane in the London neighbourhood of Wapping. The production, which was presented by Punchdrunk and the National Theatre, earned the company a nomination for the Evening Standard Theatre Award for Most Promising Newcomer and won the 2006 Critics' Circle Theatre Award for Best Designer.
- The Masque of the Red Death (2007–8), a co-production with Battersea Arts Centre (BAC). An adaptation of stories by Edgar Allan Poe including "The Masque of the Red Death". Performed at the BAC from 5 October 2007 until 12 April 2008. While each performance culminated in a ball scene, Friday and Saturday night performances were followed by Red Death Lates, an elaborate after-party with interactive performance, celebrity guests, live bands and cabaret.
- Tunnel 228 (2009), a collaboration with the Old Vic theatre, in the abandoned tunnels beneath London's Waterloo station.
- Sleep No More, a 2009 reinvention in Boston of the 2003 London production. An adaptation of Shakespeare's Macbeth. Produced in association with the American Repertory Theatre at the Old Lincoln School in Brookline, Massachusetts.
- It Felt Like a Kiss (2009). Commissioned by the Manchester International Festival and produced in collaboration with documentary filmmaker Adam Curtis and musician Damon Albarn at a deserted office block in Spinningfields, Manchester. It depicted "America's rise to power in the golden age of pop, and the nightmare that came back to haunt us all." The production won the Manchester Evening News Theatre Award for Best Special Entertainment.
- The Duchess of Malfi (2010), an operatic adaptation of the play by John Webster with a score by Torsten Rasch. Produced in collaboration with English National Opera and performed in a vast, decommissioned pharmaceutical headquarters at London's Great Eastern Quay.
- Sleep No More a 2011 reinvention in New York of the 2003 London production (also revived in Boston in 2009). Performed in disused warehouses at 530 W 27th Street in Manhattan, which was transformed into a faded hotel. Sleep No More won a Drama Desk Award for Unique Theatrical Experience and a Special Citation For Design And Choreography at the Obie Awards. Its New York run ended on January 5, 2025.
- The Crash of the Elysium, commissioned by Manchester International Festival, BBC, London 2012 Festival and Salford City Council. A 2011 one-hour show for children aged between 6 and 12, made in collaboration with the television series Doctor Who.
- The Drowned Man: A Hollywood Fable (2013-2014), an adaptation of Woyzeck set in a sixties film studio, performed in a disused postal sorting office in Paddington, London. Presented by Punchdrunk and the National Theatre.
- Sleep No More, a 2016 re-imagining of the London production in Shanghai. An adaptation of Shakespeare's Macbeth. Co-produced with Shanghai Media Group Live.
- Kabeiroi (2017), a six-hour immersive production performed on the streets of London, designed for only two audience members at a time.
- The Guilty Party, a 2017 interactive experience commissioned by Turner Broadcasting System (TBS) and Civic Entertainment Group, USA for the launch of season two of Search Party.
- The Third Day is a co-production between Sky Studios and HBO, in partnership with Plan B Entertainment, writer Dennis Kelly and Punchdrunk International. The six-part, one-hour episode limited series stars Jude Law as Sam, who after being drawn to a mysterious Island off the British Coast, is thrown into the unusual world of its secretive inhabitants.
- The Burnt City (2022-2023), a production based around the fall of Troy, performed in Woolwich's Royal Arsenal, London.
- Viola's Room (2024), an audio-driven journey through a moonlit fever dream. Barefoot and wearing headphones, audiences feel their way through a labyrinthine installation as an unseen narrator reveals a story of innocence lost and obsession unleashed. Ran at The Carriageworks in Woolwich from May - December 2024. Viola's Room has since been revived in New York City at the Shed in Hudson Yards, where it is scheduled to run from June 17—October 19, 2025.
- Sleep No More, a 2025 Seoul production based on the New York production of the same name. In partnership with the Ms. Jackson production company. Scheduled to begin previews in July 2025.
- Lander 23 (2026), a multiplayer stealth game performed in London.

== Punchdrunk Partnerships ==
- To celebrate the launch of their flagship New Bond Street store, in 2010 Louis Vuitton approached Punchdrunk with the ambitious challenge of reinventing the party. Inspired by original Louis Vuitton luggage, the worlds they contain and the narratives they suggest, Punchdrunk created the labyrinthine world of The Collector. Choosing between six mysterious doors on arrival, the guests were taken through a sensory extravaganza before congregating in a glittering ballroom for dinner.
- The Night Chauffeur was a unique intervention between Punchdrunk and the creative agency Mother to launch Stella Black in a select number of London bars in the winter of 2010. Over a two-week period, up to 800 people participated in an immersive story played out on the streets of London. The actual performances took place in the back of vintage Citroen DS cars.
- Punchdrunk was approached by W Hotel’s PR agency, John Doe, to create an innovative way to showcase the new Leicester Square W Hotel to VIP and Press in 2011. Five bespoke stories were created as exclusive 1-on-1 performances for just 60 audience members. Fed through in groups of five, guests were led to believe it was a standard tour only to get into the lift and be dropped off one by one on a different floor in One Hundred and Ninety Two Doors.
- Following the success of The Night Chauffeur, Punchdrunk was commissioned to devise another immersive performance for a larger audience for Stella Artois in 2011, which lasted for a longer period of time. The result was The Black Diamond, a fusion of live cinema and theatre. The show ran for six weeks and played to an audience of 3,000 who registered on-line for free tickets.
- Asked to create an immersive experience inspired by the Playstation game Resistance 3 to promote its release, And Darkness Descended ran in 2011. Using the myriad of tunnels underneath Waterloo train station, the role of the audience as player, participant and character was explored to create a unique survival horror experience that transcended theatre and gaming.
- Alexander McQueen asked Punchdrunk to create a top secret fashion show concept for Sarah Burton as part of her McQ A/W 2012 collection, that was to include music, set and performers.
- Punchdrunk was invited to collaborate with award-winning musician, Jack White, on a one-off secret gig in 2014 to celebrate his newly released album Lazaretto. Set in an abandoned office block which was transformed into Vescovo & Co’s medical research centre, audiences became patients and a contagious disease ran riot.
- Silverpoint was a 2015 piece of research and development, in partnership with Absolut and Somethin’ Else. Punchdrunk created a mobile gaming app, with an aesthetic that celebrated Andy Warhol’s lesser known Silverpoint sketches. Players were rewarded with pieces of story as they advanced through the levels of the game, which culminated in three live levels taking place in locations across London. Silverpoint won a Digital Dozen: Breakthroughs in Storytelling award from Columbia University School of the Arts in 2016.
- A 2016 collaboration with Samsung and international recording artist Rihanna to mark the launch of her eighth studio album ANTI. The project won a Bronze Lion in the Integrated Campaign Led By Promo & Activation category at the Cannes Lions International Festival of Creativity 2016.
- Believe Your Eyes, a 2016 VR experience commissioned by Samsung for the Cannes Lions International Festival of Creativity. Believe Your Eyes was awarded a Silver Lion in the Entertainment category at Cannes 2017.
- Punchdrunk was commissioned in 2017 by Turner Broadcasting System (TBS) and Civic Entertainment Group, USA to create an interactive experience for the launch of Search Party season two. Guests were invited to Public Hotel, NYC to delve into scenes from season one and granted a sneak preview into the darker themes and narratives of forthcoming episodes through a series of interactions with performers in The Guilty Party.
- Following their secret gig at the McKittrick Hotel, Mumford & Sons approached Punchdrunk to collaborate on their Delta Tour. They wanted Punchdrunk to help them achieve an intimate, immersive experience for their audience despite the scale of the arenas at which they were playing in 2018.

== The Punchdrunk Encyclopaedia ==
The Punchdrunk Encyclopaedia was published by Routledge in 2019, edited by the theatre scholar Josephine Machon. Development of the book began in 2014, after Machon interviewed Felix Barrett for a book on British theatre companies. Machon interviewed further members of Punchdrunk and visited Barrett's parents' home.

The book is structured as an encyclopaedia to allow non-linear exploration of its contents, mirroring Punchdrunk's non-linear performances. It was reviewed by The Times Literary Supplement, and nominated for the Theatre Book Prize in 2020.

== See also ==
- Site-specific theatre
- Postmodern theatre
