= Felix Barrett =

British artistic director

Felix Barrett is the artistic director of Punchdrunk, a British theatre company founded in 2000. In 2015, a new company was formed, Punchdrunk International, which produces a selection of Punchdrunk’s commercial productions for national and international audiences.

Barrett is a graduate and Honorary Doctorate in Drama of the University of Exeter and was one of the first recipients of a Paul Hamlyn Foundation Breakthrough Fund Award (supporting exceptional arts practitioners in the development of their vision). He was appointed Member of the Most Excellent Order of the British Empire (MBE) in the 2016 Queen’s Birthday Honours for services to theatre.

Barrett is the creator and executive producer of The Third Day, a co-production between Sky Studios and HBO, in partnership with Plan B Entertainment, writer Dennis Kelly and Punchdrunk International. It was the company's first TV production and aired in the UK and the US in 2020.

In 2023, Barrett was announced as the Director for the new stage show Paranormal Activity, based on the film franchise. The show opened in Leeds, before transferring to London and New York.
