= Oculus Rift =

Virtual reality headsets by Oculus VR

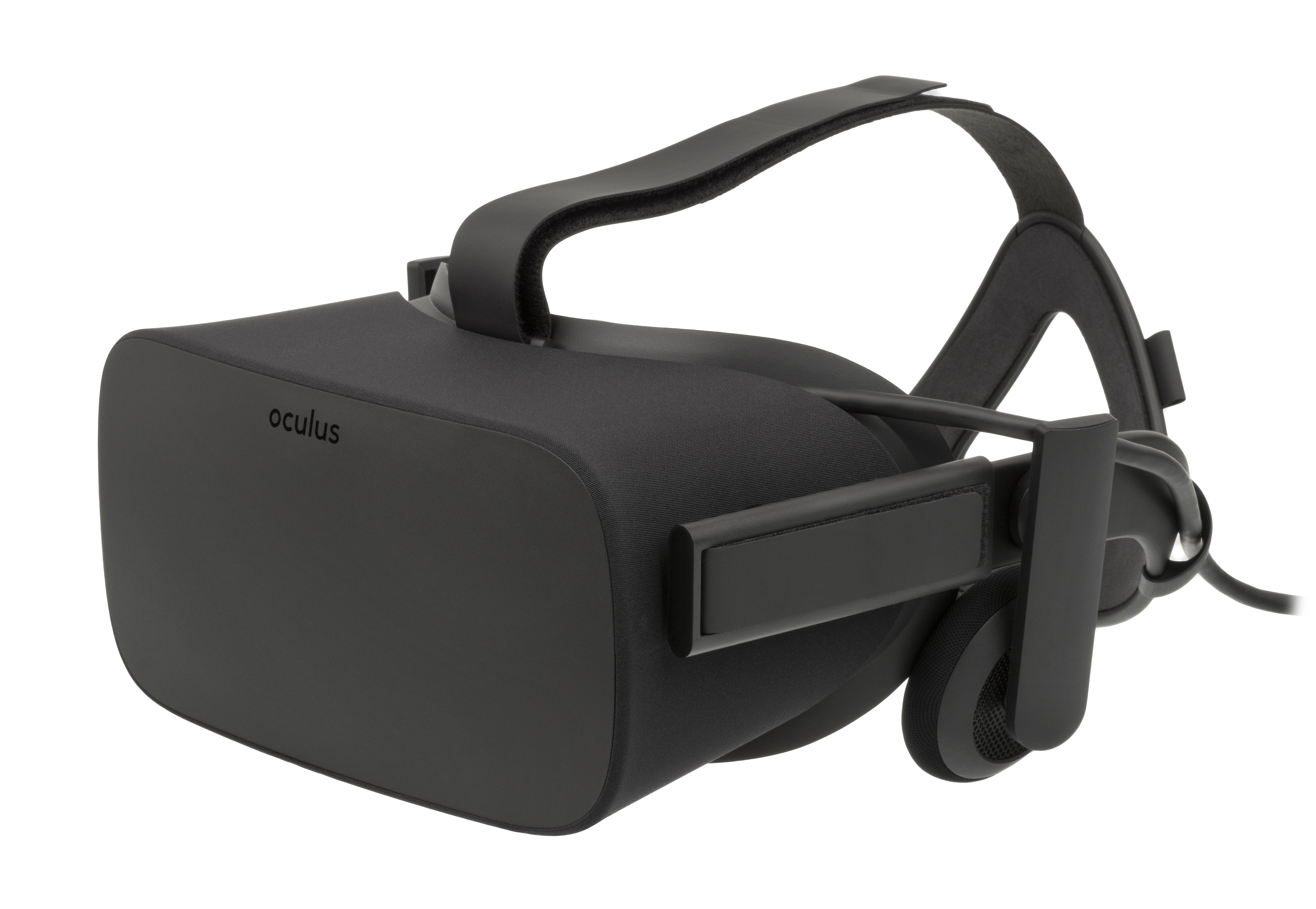
- Product type: Virtual reality headset (PC, tethered)
- Current owner: Oculus VR
- Country: United States
- Introduced: April 2012
- Discontinued: April 2021
- Markets: Worldwide
- Tagline: Step into the Game
- Website: oculusvr.com

Oculus Rift is a discontinued line of virtual reality headsets developed and manufactured by Oculus VR, a virtual reality company founded by Palmer Luckey. It was the first virtual reality headset to provide a realistic experience at an accessible price, utilizing novel technology to increase quality and reduce cost by orders of magnitude compared to earlier systems. The first headset in the line was the Oculus Rift Development Kit 1 (DK1), released on March 28, 2013. The last was the Oculus Rift S, discontinued in April 2021.

The Rift went through various pre-production models prior to the release of the Oculus Rift CV1, the first Oculus Rift intended for use by the general public. Two of these, the DK1 in early-2013 and DK2 in mid-2014, were intended to provide content developers with a development kit platform to create content for the Rift's eventual consumer release. However, both development kits were purchased by many gaming enthusiasts who wished to get an early preview of the technology. The Rift saw its official consumer release in March 2016 with the Oculus Rift CV1, and was eventually replaced in March 2019 by the Oculus Rift S. The Oculus Rift software library is still compatible with its successor, the Oculus Go and the Oculus Quest.

== History ==
=== Initial prototypes ===
External media

Images
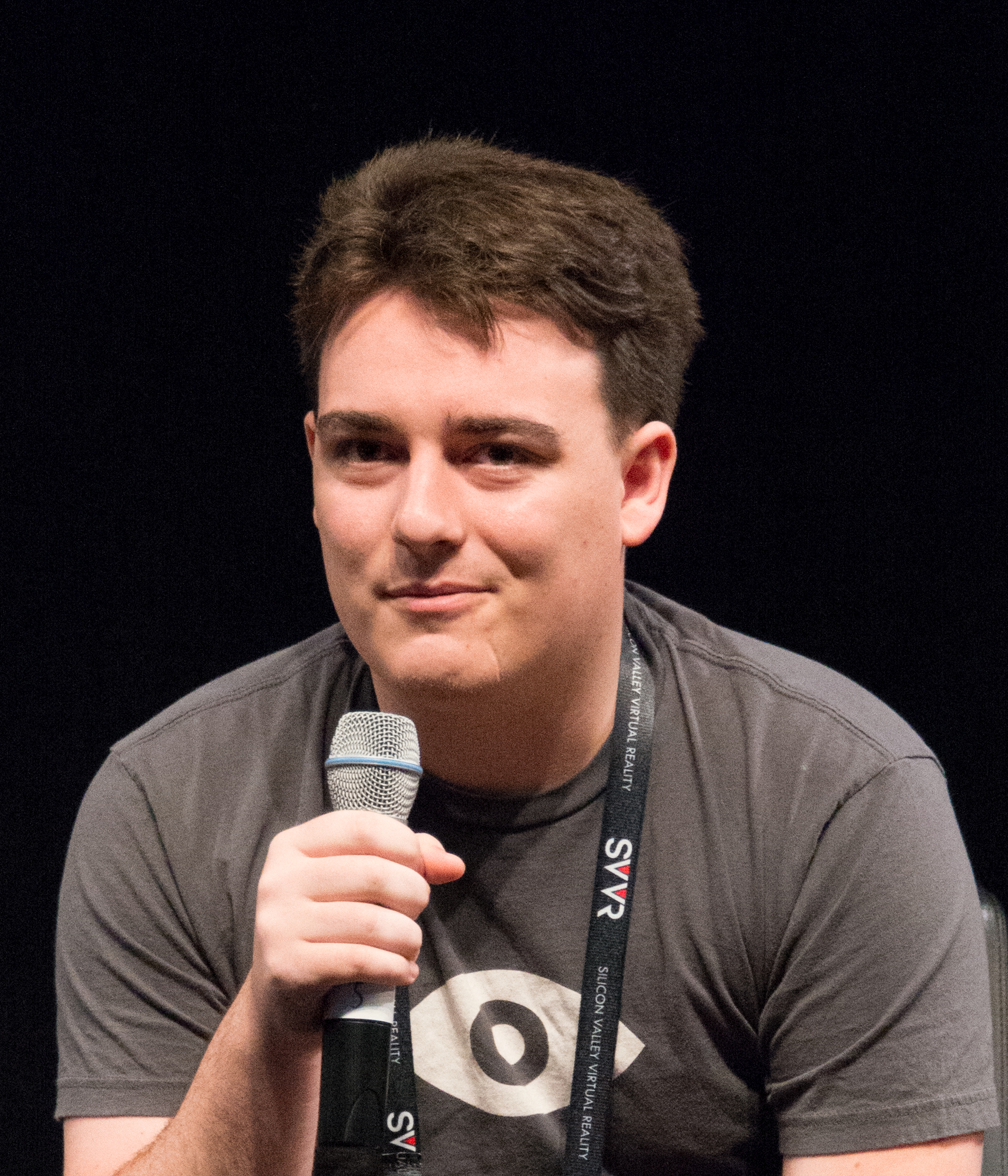

Video
- "Oculus Rift: Step Into The Game" on Kickstarter

Through Meant to be Seen (MTBS)'s virtual reality and 3D discussion forums, Palmer Luckey, the founder of Oculus and longtime MTBS discussion forum moderator, developed the idea of creating a new head-mounted display that was both more effective than what was then on the market, and inexpensive for gamers.

The first prototype of the Oculus Rift was created in 2011 by Palmer Luckey (then 18 years old) in his parents’ garage in Long Beach, California. Luckey had been building his own virtual reality headsets since 2009, but the 2011 prototype was the first to incorporate key technologies like geometric pre-distortion and a wide stereoscopic field-of-view that would come to define all of his subsequent designs. Luckey decided to drop out of college and start Oculus VR, intending to turn his prototype into the world's first mass-produced virtual reality headset.

Noted videogame pioneer John Carmack, the founder of id Software, had been doing extensive research into virtual reality technology, leading Luckey to lend him a prototype Oculus Rift. Carmack wrote a public review of the prototype calling it "by far the most immersive HMD" he had used, noting that the targeted price would also make it the cheapest. At the 2012 Electronic Entertainment Expo, Id Software gave demonstrations of their games running on the prototype Oculus Rift and announced that their newest game, Doom 3 BFG Edition, would be compatible with the Oculus Rift. These early prototypes used a high speed IMU, 5.6" LCD, and wide-FOV optics to project a 90 degrees horizontal and 110 degrees vertical stereoscopic 3D view onto the retina of the user.

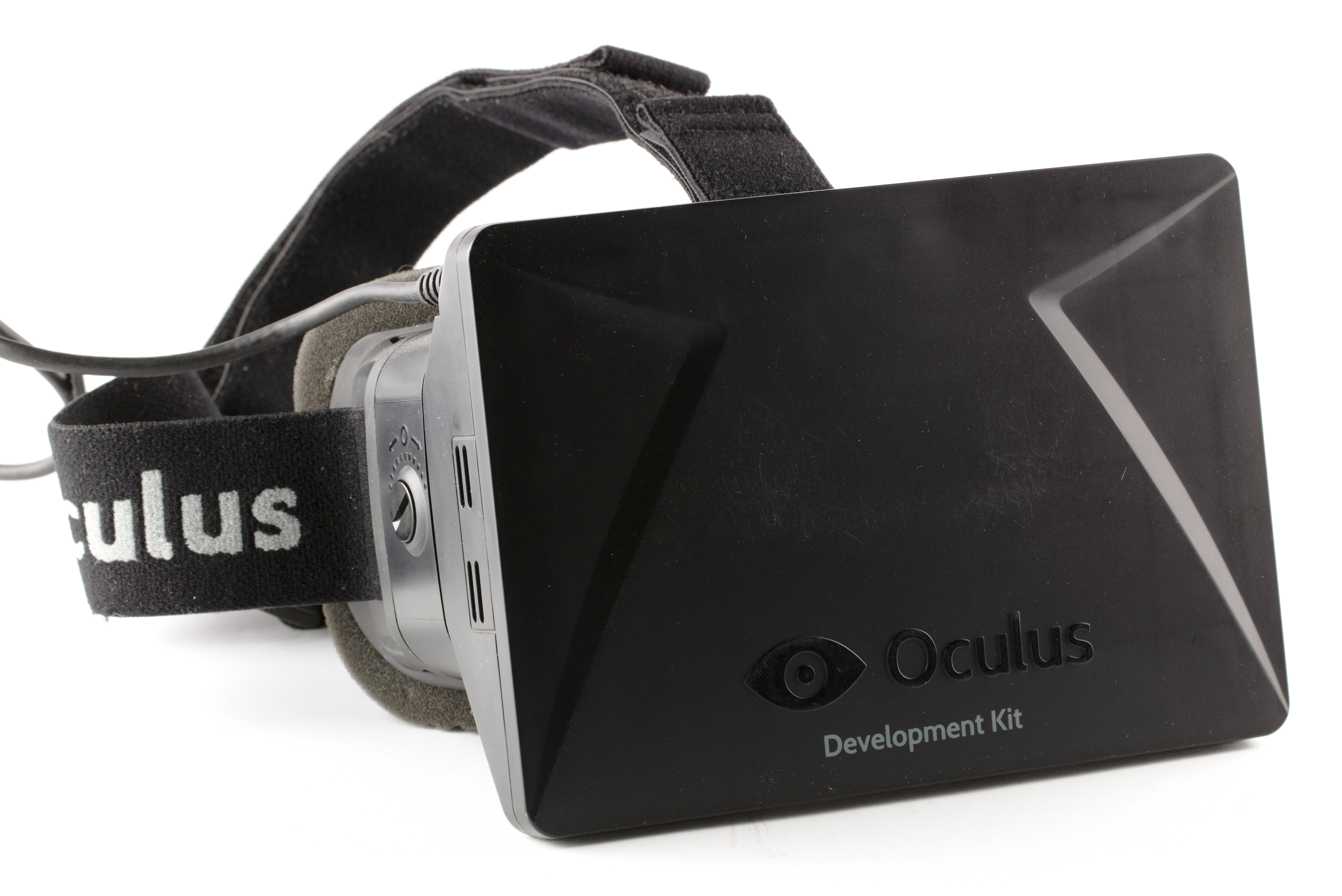
The Development Kit 1

=== Development Kit 1 ===
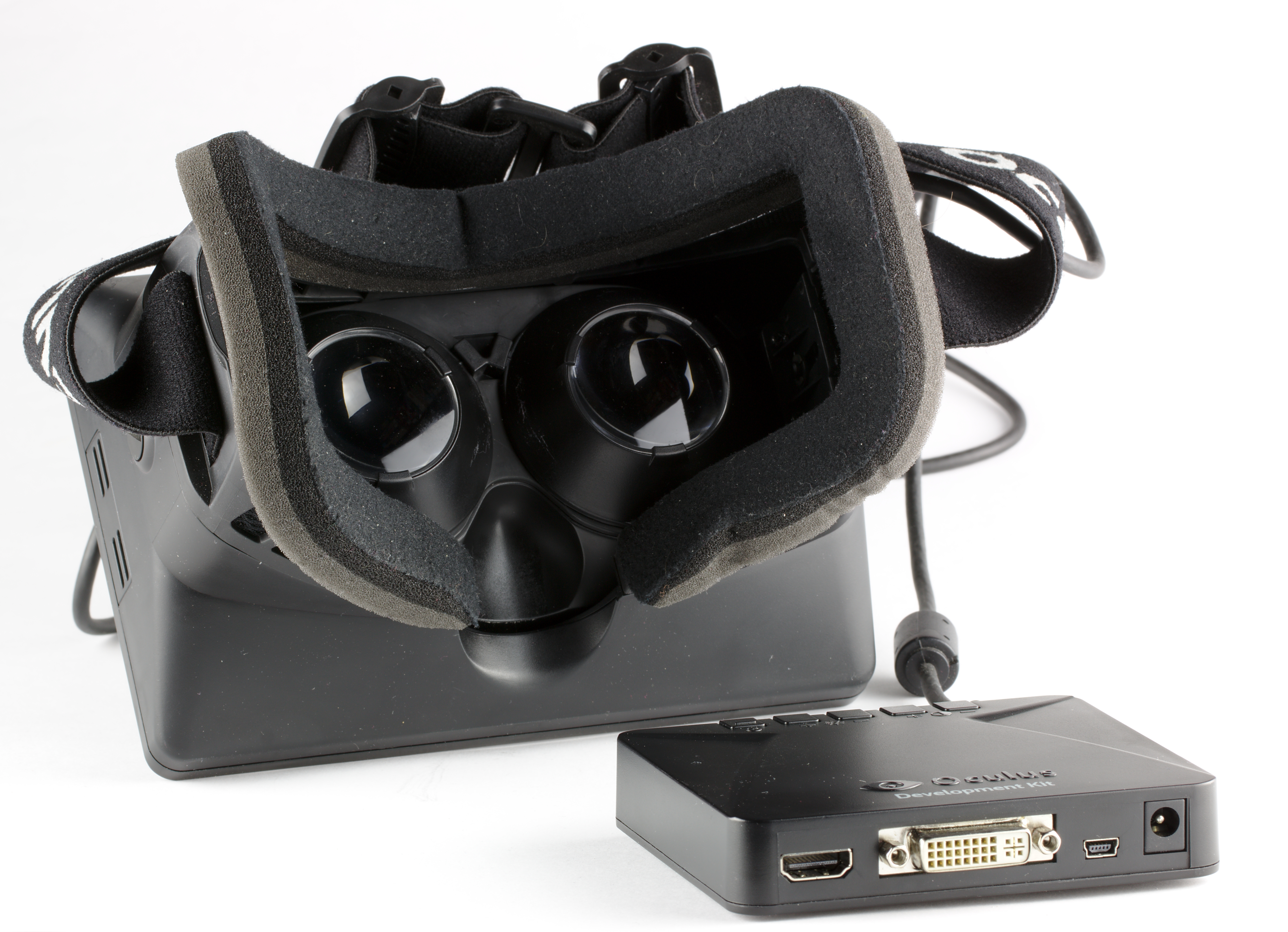
Rear view and control box

Two months after being formed as a company, Palmer's Oculus VR launched a Kickstarter crowdfunding campaign on August 1, 2012, for their virtual reality headset, named the Rift. The main purpose of the Kickstarter was to get an Oculus Rift prototype—now referred to as Oculus Rift DK1 (Development Kit 1)—into the hands of developers to begin integration of the device into their games. The DK1 was given as a reward to backers who pledged $300 or more on Kickstarter, and was later sold publicly for $300 on their website. These kits sold at a rate of 4–5 per minute for the first day, before slowing down throughout the week.

The Rift DK1 was released on March 29, 2013, and uses a 7-inch (18 cm) screen with a significantly faster pixel switching speed than the original prototype, reducing latency and motion blur when turning one's head quickly. The pixel fill is also better, reducing the screen door effect and making individual pixels less noticeable. The LCD is brighter and the color depth is 24 bits per pixel.

The 7-inch screen also makes the stereoscopic 3D no longer 100% overlapping, the left eye seeing extra area to the left and the right eye seeing extra area to the right, in which there is no 3D depth perception. The field of view (FOV) is more than 90 degrees horizontal (110 degrees diagonal), which is more than double the FOV of previous VR devices from other companies, and is the primary strength of the device. The resolution is 1280×800 (16:10 aspect ratio), which leads to an effective of 640×800 per eye (4:5 aspect ratio). However, since the device does not feature a 100% overlap between the eyes, the combined horizontal resolution is effectively greater than 640. The image for each eye is shown in the panel as a barrel distorted image that is then corrected by pincushion effect created by lenses in the headset, generating a spherical-mapped image for each eye.

Initial prototypes used a Hillcrest Labs 3DoF head tracker that is normally 125 Hz, with a special firmware requested by John Carmack that makes it run at 250 Hz, tracker latency being vital due to the dependency of virtual reality's realism on response time. The latest version includes Oculus's new 1000 Hz Adjacent Reality Tracker, which aims to provide much lower latency tracking than almost any other tracker. It uses a combination of three-axis gyros, accelerometers, and magnetometers, which make it capable of absolute (relative to Earth) head orientation tracking without drift.

The Development Kit 1 also included interchangeable lenses that aim to allow for simple dioptric correction.

The entire source for the Rift DK1 was released to the public in September 2014, including the firmware, schematics, and mechanicals for the device. The firmware is released under a simplified BSD license, while the schematics and mechanicals are released under a Creative Commons Attribution 4.0 International License.

=== HD and Crystal Cove prototypes ===
In June 2013, a prototype of the Rift that used a 1080p LCD panel was shown at Electronic Entertainment Expo. This step forwards to twice the number of pixels as DK1 significantly reduced the screen door effect and made objects in the virtual world more clear, especially at a distance. The poor resolution had been the main criticism of the DK1.

This HD prototype is the only prototype of the Rift shown to the public which did not turn into a publicly available developer kit.

In January 2014, an updated prototype codenamed "Crystal Cove" was unveiled at Consumer Electronics Show, which used a special low-persistence of vision OLED display as well as a new motion tracking system that utilized an external camera to track infrared dots located on the headset. The new motion tracking system would allow the system to detect actions such as leaning or crouching, which was claimed to help alleviate sickness experienced by users when the software did not respond to these actions.

=== Development Kit 2 ===
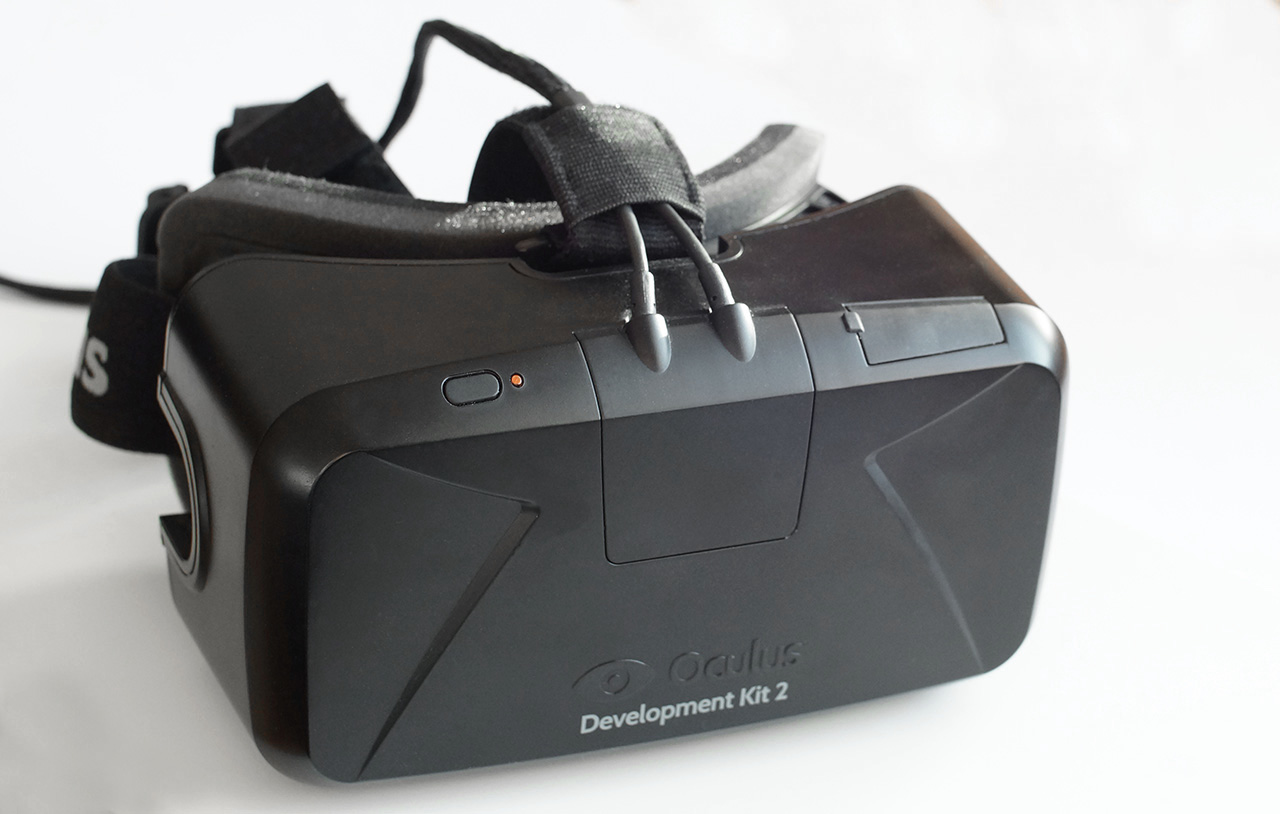
The Development Kit 2

Oculus began shipping Oculus Rift DK2 (Development Kit 2) in July 2014. This is a small refinement of the "Crystal Cove" prototype, featuring several key improvements over the first development kit, such as having a higher-resolution (960×1080 per eye) low-persistence OLED display, higher refresh rate of 75 Hz, positional tracking, a detachable cable, and the omission of the need for the external control box.

A teardown of DK2 revealed that it incorporates a modified Samsung Galaxy Note 3 smartphone display, including the front panel from the device itself.

In February 2015, Oculus announced that over 100,000 DK2 units had been shipped up until that point.

=== Crescent Bay prototype ===
In September 2014, Oculus once again presented an updated version of the Rift, codenamed Crescent Bay. This version has a greater resolution than the DK2, a lower weight, built-in audio, and 360-degree tracking thanks to the presence of tracking LEDs in the back of the headset. Oculus has also licensed software library RealSpace3D, which is expected to provide the Rift with HRTF and reverb algorithms. During a panel at SXSW 2015, titled "Explore the Future of VR", it was publicly announced for the first time that the prototype uses two screens instead of one as previously thought.

=== First consumer version ===
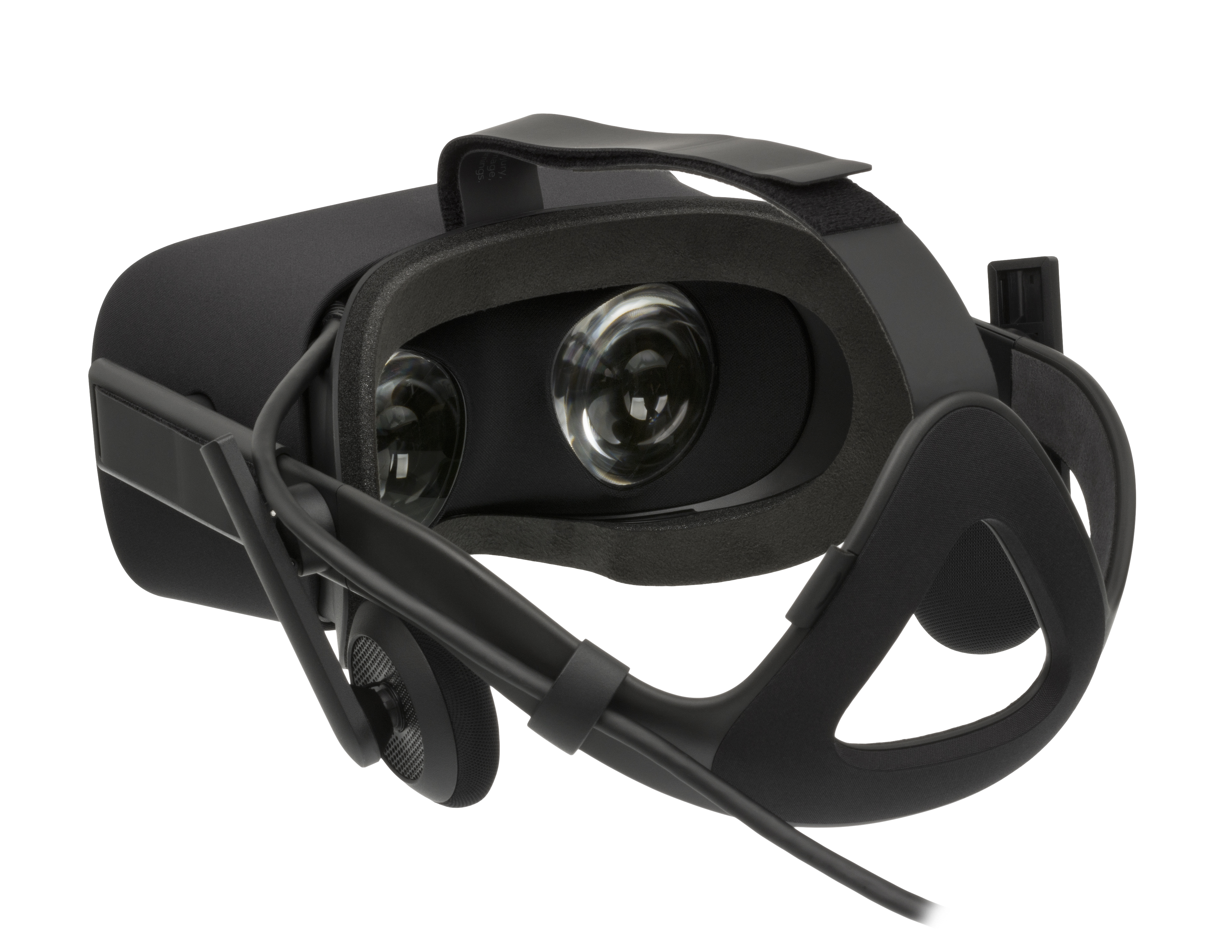
Oculus Rift, sometimes referred to as "Consumer Version 1" or "CV1"

Oculus VR announced on May 6, 2015, that the consumer version of the Rift would ship in the first quarter of 2016, and on March 25, 2016, the first batch of headsets began shipping to consumers.

In January, 2016, Oculus announced that backers of the original Kickstarter who had pledged $275 or more—roughly 7,500 users—would be gifted a free Oculus Rift kit, including the new headset, a game controller, and two VR games.

The consumer version is an improved version of the Crescent Bay Prototype, featuring per-eye displays with a 1080×1200 resolution, running at 90 Hz, 360-degree positional tracking, integrated audio, a vastly increased positional tracking volume, and a heavy focus on consumer ergonomics and aesthetics.

In March 2019, during the announcement of the Rift S, it was said that the Rift S would replace the original Rift. However, Oculus VR stated that they planned to support the CV1 with software updates for "the foreseeable future".

=== Rift S ===
On May 21, 2019, Oculus began shipping a new VR headset known as Rift S. The Rift S has a 1,280 ×1,440 LCD @ 80 Hz and slightly larger field of view than that of the CV1, but lacks mechanical IPD adjustment (IPD adjustment is software-only). The Rift S tracks the position of itself and its controllers in 3D space using a system known as Oculus Insight, which uses the 5 cameras on the HMD to track points in the environment and infrared LEDs on the controllers, information from accelerometers in both the HMD and controllers, and computer vision to predict what path the HMD and controllers are most likely to take. The Rift S uses a DisplayPort 1.2 port and one USB 3.0 port, as opposed to the HDMI and USB 3.0 port used on the Rift CV1. The Rift S targeted the same price point ($399) and hardware requirements as the Rift CV1, and quickly went on to replace it.

During September 2020, it was announced that the Rift S would be discontinued in 2021 in order for Oculus to focus on the Oculus Quest 2. In 2021, the Rift S was officially discontinued and was no longer available on the Oculus website, effectively ending the Rift line.

== Software ==
=== Runtime ===
The Oculus Rift runtime officially supports Microsoft Windows, macOS, and Linux. The installation package includes components such as the headset driver (which includes Oculus Display driver and controller drivers), Positional Tracking Sensor driver, Oculus Service, and Oculus Home Application. The runtime service implements a number of processing techniques intended to minimize latency and in addition improve the smoothness of VR applications under weaker hardware. These include direct mode, asynchronous timewarp, and asynchronous spacewarp.

=== Oculus Home ===
When the user puts on the Rift and no other content is being outputted to the headset, they are presented with Oculus Home. This is the default environment of the Rift, which presents them with a loft environment and a floating menu, allowing the user to launch VR applications they own, see if their friends are using the Rift, and purchase virtual reality content on the Oculus Home store from the headset.

An update to the base software, called Core 2.0, introduced a more interactive default environment, allowing the user to navigate and customize it with imported 3D models. However in 2023, Meta, formerly known as Oculus, closed Oculus Home and killed it off.

=== Oculus Store ===
Oculus maintains a market place for applications for the headsets. The listings are curated to only allow applications that run smoothly on the recommended hardware. Most listings are also rated on their comfort level based on their likelihood of causing motion sickness or number of jump scares. However, developers do not have to use Oculus Home to distribute content for the Rift, this being entirely optional. The Store can be accessed from the VR-based Oculus Home, from its desktop app, or on the Oculus web site under the section "Experiences."

==== Features ====
Listings on the registry include:

- Age and content ratings
- Comfort rating: "comfortable", "moderate", "intense" (assigned by Oculus)
- User ratings and reviews: user can give a rating on a 5-star scale and write a review

=== SDK ===
Software for the Rift is developed using the Oculus PC SDK, a free proprietary SDK available for Microsoft Windows (OSX and Linux support is planned for the future). This is a feature complete SDK which handles for the developer the various aspects of making virtual reality content, such as the optical distortion and advanced rendering techniques.

The Oculus SDK is directly integrated with the popular game engines Unity 5, Unreal Engine 4, and Cryengine. This allows for developers already familiar with these engines to create VR content with little to no VR-specific code.

Developers do not need any approval or verification from Oculus to develop, distribute, or sell software for the Rift, and do not have to pay any licensing fees. The SDK, however, cannot be modified or reused for other purposes or hardware without permission.

Content developed for the Development Kit 2 using SDK version 0.8 or above are compatible with the Rift; however, content developed for the Development Kit 1 or with older versions of the SDK will have to be recompiled using the latest SDK version to be compatible.

On December 21, 2015, Oculus announced the release of their finalized Rift 1.0 SDK, combined with the start of shipping their final version of the Oculus Rift VR headset to developers.

At Oculus's 3rd annual conference (Oculus Connect 3), it announced the new technology, called "Asynchronous Spacewarp (ASW)". This technology allows the Rift to compensate for the dropped frames. According to Oculus, ASW reduces the minimum specs of a PC to run the Rift without any judder.

== System requirements ==
In May 2015, Oculus VR announced "recommended" hardware specifications for computers utilizing Oculus Rift, specifying a CPU equivalent to an Intel Core i5-4590, at least 8GB of RAM, at least an AMD Radeon R9 290 or Nvidia GeForce GTX 970 graphics card, an HDMI 1.3 output, three USB 3.0 ports, and one USB 2.0 port. Oculus VR stated that these requirements would remain in force for the life of the first consumer model. The company also stated that while upcoming discrete GPUs for laptops may be able to reach the required performance for Oculus Rift, systems that switch between integrated and discrete graphics may not handle output in a manner that supports the device. Oculus Rift only supports 64-bit versions of Microsoft Windows 7 SP1 or later; Oculus VR stated that the device would initially support Windows only in order to focus on "delivering a high[-]quality consumer-level VR experience"; support for Linux and macOS will be developed in the future.

A hardware testing application is available, and Oculus VR has also certified and promoted specific models of pre-built computers that meet these recommendations, from vendors such as Asus, Alienware and Dell Inc., as being "Oculus Ready".

On October 6, 2016, Oculus VR announced lessened hardware recommendations, now suggesting an Intel Core i3-6100 or AMD FX 4350 CPU, at least a GeForce GTX 960 or equivalent graphics card, two USB 3.0 ports and one USB 2.0 port, and Windows 8 or newer. The company stated that these lower requirements were enabled by the adoption of motion interpolation; on systems that cannot handle full 90 frames per second rendering, the drivers will allow software to render at 45 FPS instead, and generate frames based on differences between them to send to the headset to maintain its frame rate. Oculus promoted that these changes lowered the average hardware cost of a PC meeting these specifications to US$500 and would also enable certain laptops to run Oculus Rift.

In June 2018, Oculus VR updated its recommended OS spec to Windows 10. While Windows 7 and Windows 8.1 users would still be able to access the standard Rift experience, newer features and apps might require an upgrade to Windows 10.

== Applications ==
=== Gaming ===
Oculus has stated that the Rift is primarily a gaming device and that their main content focus is gaming.

Existing games with a first-person or fixed-camera perspective can be ported to VR with some development effort. However, Oculus has stated that the best virtual reality experiences are those that are designed, from the beginning, for the Rift.

A number of AAA games have added Rift support (and can be played with the Development Kit 2), including Project CARS, Elite: Dangerous, Euro Truck Simulator 2, and Dirt Rally, as well as a number of indie games such as AaAaAA!!! – A Reckless Disregard for Gravity and Ether One. Fans and hobbyists have also modded support for the Rift into several popular titles which allow for extensive low-level modding, including Minecraft and Flight Simulator X.

At the release event for the Rift in June 2015, Oculus announced 9 launch titles for the Rift, including EVE: Valkyrie by CCP and Edge of Nowhere by Insomniac Games. It also announced that it was working with other developers including Final Fantasy developer Square Enix, Rock Band developer Harmonix, and The Order: 1886 developer Ready at Dawn.

In July 2015, Oculus revealed that it was fully funding more than 20 second party high production value games made exclusively for the Rift, one of these being Insomniac's Edge of Nowhere.

In July 2017, Marvel announced in the Disney's D23 event that it will be bringing 12 superheroes of theirs to VR with an Oculus exclusive game called Powers United VR.

=== Non-gaming ===
==== Media ====
Oculus is including Oculus Cinema as a free application, which allows the Rift to be used to view conventional movies and videos from inside a virtual cinema environment, giving the user the perception of viewing the content on a cinema-sized screen. Oculus Cinema will also have a networked mode, in which multiple users can watch the same video in the same virtual space, seeing each other as avatars and being able to interact and talk to one another while watching the video.

The Rift also offers the opportunity to view new types of media that are impossible to view on regular monitors; 360° 3D videos and 'virtual reality movies' (an entirely new medium).

Spherical videos (commonly called 360° videos) can be viewed simply by the user moving their head around, and the Rift opens up the possibility for stereoscopic spherical videos (commonly called 360° 3D videos). In September 2014, NextVR announced that they would be using a $200,000 camera rig to produce 360° 3D content for the Rift, including short films, as well as live streaming live events such as sports or concerts in 360° 3D. In July 2015, Oculus announced a deal with Canadian film company Felix & Paul Studios to produce 360° 3D videos for the Rift.

The Rift also supports a new medium of entertainment experiences, which Oculus calls "virtual reality movies". Oculus has established Oculus Story Studio to develop this type of content for the Rift, a team which has multiple former employees from major VFX companies such as PIXAR and ILM. Oculus Story Studio showed off its first VR movie, Lost, at the 2015 Sundance Film Festival, gaining positive reviews from attendees.

The studio intends to have 5 VR shorts released with the Rift at launch, including Lost, Bullfighter, Henry, Dear Angelica, and Kabloom.

==== Social ====
A visitor at Mozilla Berlin Hackshibition trying an Oculus Rift virtual reality experience on Firefox

Oculus believes that social applications will be the most popular virtual reality experiences in the long term. A number of social applications for the Rift had been in development.

In May 2015, AltspaceVR launched a public beta for DK2 owners to try out their social VR platform. AltspaceVR allows people to inhabit a shared virtual space with spatial voice communications, cast content from the Internet on virtual screens, and interact with objects (allowing activities such as playing chess or other board games). It also supports extra hardware like eye tracking and body tracking.

In 2013, Philip Rosedale, the founder of Second Life, left Linden Lab to work on a new virtual world designed for the Rift, called High Fidelity, which will link thousands of user-hosted virtual environments together into a consistent virtual world.

In May 2015, Linden Lab, the company behind Second Life, announced that they too were working on a new virtual world, codenamed Project Sansar, built for virtual reality headsets such as the Rift and Gear VR. Like Second Life, Sansar will be hosted on Linden's servers and lease virtual land to players, on which they can build and sell virtual items and services (which Linden will take a cut of). Linden Lab hoped to release Sansar by the end of 2016.

==== Industrial and professional ====
As well as the consumer uses, the Rift has attracted significant interest from industry and professional spheres for productivity enhancement, visualization, and advertising.

A number of architecture firms have been experimenting with using the Rift for visualization and design. With the right software, the Rift allows architects to see exactly what their building will look like and get an understanding of the scale that is impossible on a traditional monitor.

In early 2015, Audi started using Rift Developer Kit 2's at dealerships to help customers configure the car they are interested in, as well as to see what driving a race in the car would be like.

The Norwegian Army experimented with the Rift Development Kit 2 to allow for a greater situational awareness of armoured vehicle drivers and commanders.

The use of the Oculus Rift on a virtual operator station assists the control of a teleoperated military mobile robot Tactical Robotic System (TAROS). Human operators have more intuitive control and mediate 3D view from stereovision cameras.

Oculus Medium is a painting app for Oculus Rift.

Education

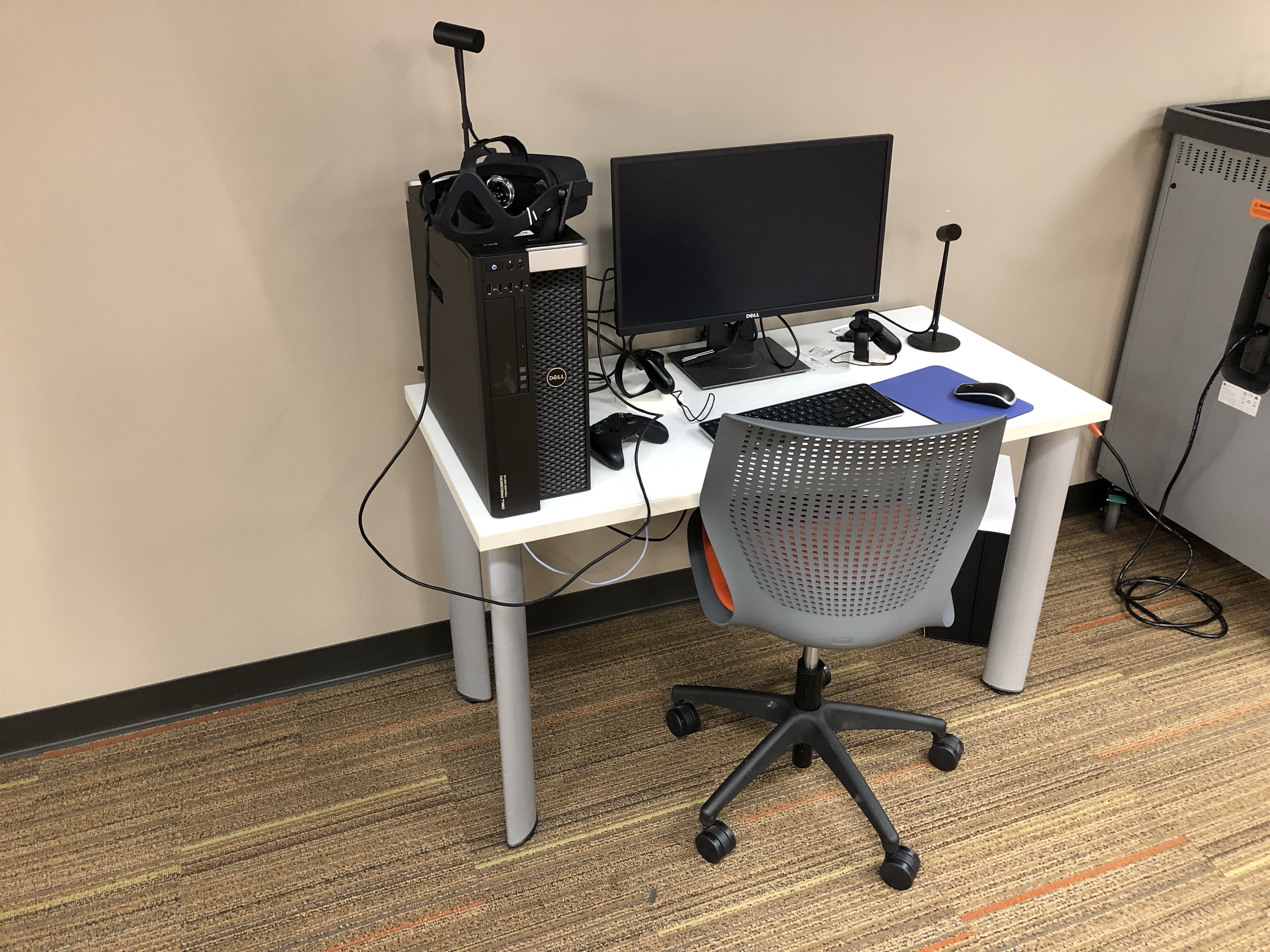
A library workstation with an Oculus Rift

The Oculus Rift is increasingly used in universities and schools as an educational tool. The ability to provide an immersive, engaging environment can assist a diverse range of students for learning. In particular, there appears to be benefits to medical, health science and exercise students when utilising the Oculus Rift as a supplement for content provided in anatomy and physiology. There is also increasing use of the Oculus Rift within curricula in other fields such as marketing, architecture, clinical education., computer science and paramedics

==== Television ====
In October 2016, the television series Halcyon was released as a "virtual reality series", where some episodes are broadcast on conventional television. and some as VR content for Oculus Rift. It is a crime drama following the world's first "VR Crimes Unit" in 2048.

==== Sports ====
Fox Sports began producing content for the Oculus Rift and other virtual reality systems in fall 2016. Its initial content consisted mainly of Fox College Football coverage.

==== Casinos ====
Some online casinos have started using Oculus Rift to provide a unique online casino experience, allowing the user to play slots and experience the lobby of a casino through their VR headset.

== ZeniMax/Facebook lawsuits ==
ZeniMax Media, the parent company of Bethesda Softworks, which in turn owns Id Software, presented a lawsuit against Facebook, claiming the Oculus Rift was the product of intellectual property owned by ZeniMax, developed by John Carmack during his time working for Id Software. The jury ruled partially in favor of ZeniMax, finding the defendants did not steal trade secrets but had violated a non-disclosure agreement. Facebook and some of the Oculus corporate officers were ordered to pay a total of US$500 million. On March 10, 2017, it was revealed that Carmack was suing ZeniMax for US$22.7 million it owed him from their purchase of Id Software.

== Reception ==
The Oculus Rift has received generally positive reviews. The Verge felt that the Rift was a "remarkably well-made and accessible device", describing its hardware design as having succeeded in "mak[ing] something so stereotypically geeky look (relatively) natural", and the headset itself as being "lighter and more comfortable than most of its competition" once properly fitted to the user's head. Its displays were considered to be "bright and relatively clear", albeit grainy in appearance. The Rift was panned for not offering its own motion controller at launch like the HTC Vive, and that the lack of support for room-scale experiences with a single camera led to games where VR support "[felt] like an addition, not a transformation". However, the reviewer felt that the Rift's launch titles marked the first time they had played any VR game that could "rival a decently made non-VR computer game for polish and scope", and the Vive and then-upcoming Oculus Touch controllers showed a bigger potential for VR than the largely stationary experiences the Rift offered at launch. It was argued that, while acknowledging the cost limitations of the headset and the necessary computing hardware, and its "relentless" focus on gaming, the Oculus Rift "makes a good case for seated VR, and it lays a solid foundation for what's to come.

In a post-launch review, PCMag felt that the Oculus Touch controllers, improved support for room-scale experiences, and a recent price cut to US$399 made the Rift "more appealing than the more expensive HTC Vive", concluding that it "produces an immersive, crisp virtual reality experience that will continue to improve with the development of new software, which has been steadily coming out on both the Oculus store and SteamVR."
