= Tom Pearson (multidisciplinary artist) =

American multidisciplinary artist (born 1974)

- Pearson in 2018 at KGB Bar, New York
- Born: Thomas Edward Pearson Jr. 1974 (age 51–52); St. Augustine, Florida, U.S.
- Education: Florida State University (BFA); New York University (MA)
- Occupations: Poet; choreographer; artist; co-artistic director, Third Rail Projects
- Years active: 2001-Present
- Notable work: Then She Fell; The Grand Paradise; The Sandpiper's Spell; Vanishing Point; The Night Garden
- Awards: Bessie Award 2013; Bessie Award 2008
- Website: tompearsonnyc.com

Tom Pearson (born Thomas Edward Pearson, Jr., 1974) is an American poet, choreographer, director, and artist.

His books of poetry include The Sandpiper's Spell and Still, the Sky. As a founder and co-artistic director of the New York City-based performance company Third Rail Projects, he co-created the long-running immersive theater productions Then She Fell and The Grand Paradise among over 50 theatrical, dance, and site-specific works. Through Third Rail Projects, he established and serves as director of the Global Performance Studio.

Pearson has received two Bessie Awards, a Time Out Love New York Award, and a Drama Desk Awards Nomination. With the Global Performance Studio, Pearson co-created the short film The Night Garden (2022), which received a juried prize at the Tokyo International Short Film Festival, as well as experimental and mobile film honors at the Roma Short Film Festival and the Indie Short Fest in Los Angeles.

Pearson has received fellowship awards including two CEC ArtsLink Back Apartment Residencies (St. Petersburg, Russia), a Theater Fellowship from the Bogliasco Foundation (Genoa, Italy), an artist residency with The Emily Harvey Foundation (Venice, Italy), a Creative Campus Fellowship at Wesleyan University, and a creative teaching residency at Olin College of Engineering.

== Life and career ==
=== Early life and education ===
Pearson was born in St. Augustine, Florida in 1974. He studied dance, choreography, acting, and music at the Florida School of Arts at St. Johns River State College, first as a high school senior in 1992 and later graduating with an Associates degree in Acting in 1994. From June through August 1994, he continued dance studies in a summer intensive at Alvin Ailey American Dance Center in New York City. From late 1994 to early 1998, he studied dance, theater and literature at Florida State University where he holds a Bachelor of Fine Arts in Dance and Bachelor of Arts in Literature and where he later taught as an adjunct faculty in the School of Dance.

Pearson moved to New York in 1999 and received a Master of Arts in Performance Studies from New York University. He was a resident of Brooklyn for over 20 years, where he was named among the "100 most influential people in Brooklyn culture" in 2016 by Brooklyn Magazine.

=== Writing ===
In 2018, Pearson published his first book of poetry The Sandpiper's Spell. Kirkus Reviews chose it among the Best Indie Books of 2019 and called it a "masterfully observant debut poetry collection... both vastly panoramic and deeply introspective." It was an editor's pick in BookLife by Publishers Weekly, which noted the "vibrant, lyrical imagery of Pearson’s nature-influenced verses."

For his second book, Still, the Sky, Pearson combined poetry and multimedia art to create a "speculative mythology" that entwined the stories of Icarus and the Minotaur as a shared coming-of-age story "filled with rich description and striking imagery". A bilingual edition with Italian translation by Andrea Sirotti, Eppure, il cielo was published in 2023 by Interno Poesia Editore.

His individual poems have appeared in The Arlington Literary Journal, 3Elements Literary Review, Alocasia, and Poetry Quarterly, among others. In 2009, he served as editor of The Public Theater's Native Theater Journal and contributed interviews with Native American playwrights and musicians to NYU's Hemispheric Institute. His essays on dance and performance have also appeared in Dance Magazine.

=== Performance ===
Pearson is a co-founder and co-artistic director of the New York City-based performance company Third Rail Projects with Zach Morris and Jennine Willett. The company creates site-specific, immersive, and experiential performances among a range of multi-media artistic works. Their award-winning immersive show Then She Fell ran for over 4,000 performances and was named one of the “Top Ten Shows of 2012” by The New York Times and one of the "best theater experiences" of 2013 by Vogue. Other works include Confection (commissioned by the Folger Shakespeare Library), The Grand Paradise, which ran for 11 months in Bushwick, Brooklyn, and Vanishing Point. Third Rail Projects has received two Bessie Awards, a Chita Rivera Award for Choreography, and a Drama Desk Award Nomination for Unique Theatrical Experience. The company was recognized as part of the creative team of the Emmy and Peabody Award-winning virtual reality adaptation of The Wolves in the Walls and as contributors and featured artists in the Emmy Award-winning "IMMERSIVE.WORLD" series on WNET Group's ALL ARTS.

In 2019, Pearson wrote, directed, and choreographed Ikaros, a site-specific immersive performance commissioned by La Jolla Playhouse for its Without Walls (WOW) Festival at Liberty Station in San Diego. The work interwove the Greek myth of Icarus with the life of aviator Amelia Earhart, incorporating outdoor soundscapes, self-contained audio playback, and custom wing and sail structures engineered in collaboration with Olin College of Engineering students (where Pearson served as "Artist-in-Reference"). Staged along a coastal walking path, the production incorporated low-flying commercial aircraft arriving and departing from nearby San Diego International Airport directly into its choreography and themes of flight.

Pearson's staging mechanics and use of sensory curation in Ikaros have been highlighted in academic research. In a 2023 doctoral dissertation published at the University of California, Santa Barbara, researcher David Grant Mancini analyzed Ikaros as a primary case study in "emotive narrative" design, noting Pearson's use of ambient scents (such as rosemary), spatial movement, headphone audio, and environmental soundscapes to allow participants to construct non-linear thematic arcs.

In 2023, Pearson collaborated on Berette S Macaulay's multi-site work UN-[TITLED], presented by On the Boards at Wa Na Wari and Inscape Arts to examine the effects of gentrification, displacement and cultural memory in Seattle's Central District and Chinatown-International District.

=== Global Performance Studio ===
Pearson formed and serves as director of the Global Performance Studio to co-create work through international collaborations and share the site-specific and experiential performances practices of Third Rail Projects. The Global Performance Studio "cultivates opportunities to foster diplomacy through shared practice, dialogue, and community building, all within a framework of cultural listening and peer-to-peer artist exchange." To date the studio has worked with artists in Hong Kong, China, Kazakhstan, Kyrgyzstan, Germany, Italy, Russia, and the U.S.

In 2016, the studio launched its inaugural project, As Time Goes By, created in Saint Petersburg, Russia, in partnership with CEC ArtsLink during a Back Apartment Residency. Co-created by Pearson and U.S. and Russian artists and performers, the site-specific immersive performance was staged inside Ziferburg Café–a pay-per-minute "time café" in Saint Petersburg—exploring themes of memory, nostalgia, and temporal exchange.

In 2018, Pearson collaborated with U.S. and Russian artists to co-create The Night Garden, a short film shot entirely on smartphones. The film was released in 2022 and screened across several international short film festivals.

In 2023, he collaborated with the German piano quartet Flex Ensemble to co-produce Calder Moves, an immersive site-specific music and dance installation that premiered in the Calder Saal (Calder Hall)—an exhibition of Alexander Calder mobiles—at the Sprengel Museum in Hannover, Germany.

== Books ==
Pearson has published two original poetry collections and one translated volume.

- Pearson, Tom (2018). The Sandpiper's Spell. New York, NY: Ransom Poet Publishers. ISBN 978-1-0880-5782-7
- Pearson, Tom (2022). Still, the Sky. New York, NY: Ransom Poet Publishers. ISBN 978-1-0880-4768-2
- Pearson, Tom (2023). Eppure, il cielo. Translated by Andrea Sirotti. Latiano, Italy: Interno Poesia Editore. ISBN 979-12-81315-03-7

== Major performance works ==
- Cénotaphe and Ascending Sience (2001) – The Bridge for Dance Uptown Performance Series
- Screaming Shrubbery (2005) – The Merce Cunningham Studio, New York, NY
- REEL (2005) – Lower Manhattan Cultural Council SiteLines series, New York
- Lacuna (2006) – Lincoln Center Out of Doors, Lincoln Center for the Performing Arts, NY
- Vanishing Point (2008) – Danspace Project at St. Mark's Church in-the-Bowery, New York
- The One You Love is Sick (2010) – Hong Kong Youth Arts Foundation and Aedas Architects, The Béthanie, Hong Kong
- Then She Fell (2012) – Greenpoint and Williamsburg, Brooklyn, New York
- Marrow (2013) – Island Moving Company Open for Dancing Festival, for The Steel Yard, Providence, Rhode Island.
- Roadside Attraction (2013) – Arts Brookfield, New York City
- The Grand Paradise (2016) – Bushwick, Brooklyn, New York
- As Time Goes By (2016) – Global Performance Studio and CEC ArtsLink at Ziferburg Café, Saint Petersburg, Russia
- Confection (2019) – Folger Shakespeare Library, Washington D.C.
- Ikaros (2019) – La Jolla Playhouse Without Walls (WOW) Festival, Liberty Station, San Diego, California
- UN-[TITLED] (2023) – On the Boards (Seattle) and BRIC (Brooklyn)
- Calder Moves (2023) – With Flex Ensemble at the Sprengel Museum, Hannover, Germany.
- Yours To Lose (2024) – With Freedom Forum for the 1A House at South by Southwest (SXSW), Austin, Texas

== Visual art ==
- Kissing the Gunner's Daughter (and as part of The Drifting Encyclopedia) (2010) – Art installation, The Courtyard Gallery at the World Financial Center and DNA Gallery, New York City
- The Night Garden (2018) – Site-specific multimedia art installation and cultural exchange project created with Global Performance Studio and CEC ArtsLink, Art Prospekt Festival, Saint Petersburg, Russia; served as the basis for the 2022 film adaptation
- Agave Trio (2018-2021) – Sculpture series, Studio 80 + Sculpture Grounds, Old Lyme, Connecticut
- Stanzas (2020) – Art installation, Ace Hotel New York, New York City
- Archives of Asterion (2019-2022) – Art installation, Olin College of Engineering, Needham, Massachusetts
- Ablations: Cultures of Loss (2026) – Mixed media sculpture series exploring climate grief, ecology, and loss

== Film ==
- Between Yourself and Me (2017) –Co-producer with Third Rail Projects and Dance Films Association at Jacob's Pillow Dance Festival, Dance on Camera Festival at Lincoln Center, and with the Association for Theatre in Higher Education (ATHE)
- Passaggio (2019) – Director; short film; Screened at the 92Y Mobile Dance Film Festival
- The Night Garden (2022) – Co-director, writer, editor; experimental short film shot on smartphones, adapted from the 2018 Saint Petersburg site-specific art installation; winner of over 20 film festival awards
- As Time Goes By (2024) – Director; short film; Short film adaptation and documentary of 2016 immersive performance in Saint Petersburg, Russia

== Awards and accolades ==
- 2008 – New York Dance and Performance (Bessie) Awards Choreographer/Creator Award for Vanishing Point
- 2012 – The New York Times Ben Brantley's Top Shows of 2012 for Then She Fell
- 2013 – New York Dance and Performance (Bessie) Awards Outstanding Production for Then She Fell
- 2013 – Vogue Best of Theater 2013 for Then She Fell
- 2016 – Time Out New York Time Out LOVE New York Award for The Grand Paradise
- 2019 – Kirkus Reviews Best Indie Books of 2019 for The Sandpiper's Spell
- 2020 – Drama Desk Awards Nomination for Midsummer: A Banquet (with Third Rail Projects, as co-producer)
- 2021 – National Performance Network (NPN) Creation and Development Fund Award for UN-[TITLED]
- 2022 – The Night Garden:
  - Tokyo International Short Film Festival – Best Experimental Short Film (Juried)
  - Roma Short Film Festival – Best Experimental Short Film
  - Indie Short Fest/Los Angeles International Film Festival – Outstanding Achievement Award (Mobile Short)
