= Dau (surname) =

Dau is a surname. Notable people with the surname include:

== Association footballers ==
- Chok Dau (born 1998), South Sudanese footballer, plays for Perth RedStar and South Sudan
- Đậu Văn Toàn (born 1997), Vietnamese footballer, plays for Hà Nội
- Ratu Dau (born 2000), Fijian footballer, plays for Ba and Fiji
- Thomas Dau (born 1991), Austrian footballer, has played for various Austrian clubs

== Others ==
- Carl Dau (born 1942), German designer
- Heinrich Dau (1790–1831), Holstein-Danish geologist and writer
- John Dau (born 1974), American/Sudanese activist, one of the Lost Boys of Sudan
- Ramiro Lopez Dau, film director and animator
- Stephen Dau (born 1971), American-Belgian writer
- Stephen Dhieu Dau, South Sudanese politician
- Wilfred Dau, Anglican cleric in Australia

== See also ==
- Daus (surname)
