= Third Rail Projects =

American performing arts company

- Jennine Willet, Tom Pearson, and Zach Morris, co-artistic directors of Third Rail Projects
- Founded: 2001 (as Third Rail Dance) 2007 (as Third Rail Projects)
- Founder: Zach Morris, Tom Pearson, Jennine Willett, (and Brian Weaver, Third Rail Dance)
- Type: Immersive theater, dance, site-specific art, multimedia
- Headquarters: New York City
- Fields: Performing Arts
- Awards: Peabody Award 2022; Emmy Award 2018; Chita Rivera Award 2018; Bessie Award 2013; Bessie Award 2008
- Website: thirdrailprojects.com

Third Rail Projects is a multi-disciplinary American performing arts company that creates site-specific work, immersive theater, experiential performances and more.

Among more than 50 productions and projects, Third Rail Project's long-running show Then She Fell ran for 4,444 performances in New York City from 2012 to 2020.

Under the co-direction of Zach Morris, Tom Pearson and Jennine Willett, the company has received two Bessie Awards, a Chita Rivera Award for Dance and Choreography, and a Drama Desk Award nomination for Unique Theatrical Experience. Third Rail Projects was recognized as part of the creative team of the Peabody and Emmy Award-winning virtual reality adaptation of Wolves in the Walls. Morris, Pearson, and Willett were named among the "100 most influential people" in Brooklyn Culture by Brooklyn Magazine for their work with Third Rail Projects.

== History ==
Founded as Third Rail Dance in 2001 by Tom Pearson, Brian Weaver and Jennine Willett, the company was reformed as Third Rail Projects when Zach Morris joined the group as co-artistic director with Pearson and Willett in 2005.

In 2008, Third Rail Projects' Vanishing Point, an evening-length dance exploration of family histories presented by Danspace Project, won Bessie Awards for choreography and music.

In 2012, Third Rail Projects presented Then She Fell, an immersive, site-specific work that incorporated dance and theater, drawing from the life and work of Lewis Carroll. It won a Bessie Award for outstanding production, was named as one of the “Top Ten Shows of 2012” by The New York Times and acclaimed as one of the best theater experiences of 2013 by Vogue. As of 2019, it had over 4,000 performances; production was suspended in March 2020 due to the COVID-19 pandemic.

Other notable productions include Sweet & Lucky, commissioned by Denver Center for the Performing Arts (2016); Learning Curve with Albany Park Theater Project (APTP) (2016); The Grand Paradise; As Time Goes By as part of the Global Performance Studio (2016); Between Yourself and Me presented by Dance Films Association (2017); Ghost Light, which won the Chita Rivera Award for Dance and Choreography (2018); the Peabody and Emmy-winning virtual reality adaptation of Wolves in the Walls by Fable Studio and Oculus, for which Third Rail Projects provided the choreography (2019); Midsummer: A Banquet, which was nominated for a Unique Theatrical Experience Drama Desk Award (2020); and Port of Entry, also with APTP (2023).

== Productions ==
Since 2005, Third Rail Projects has produced over 50 shows and projects.

=== Highlights of productions and projects 2005-present ===
- Screaming Shrubbery (2005)
- REEL (2005)
- Lacuna (2006)
- Rub the Sleep (2007)
- Strangers on Tong Chong Street (2007)
- Vanishing Point (2008)
- The Witness Project/Mesa 2.0 (2009)
- Steampunk Haunted House (2009–2011)
- Beautiful Dreamer (2010)
- The One You Love is Sick (2010)
- Drifting Encyclopedia (2010)
- Undercurrents & Exchange (2010)
- Looking Glass (2011)
- Then She Fell (2012–2020)
- Bathing Aiperi (2013)
- Fountain (2013)
- Marrow (2013)
- Roadside Attraction (2014)
- Recess (2014)
- Anthem (2014)
- Yolk (2014)
- House No. 17 (2014)
- Midnight Madness (2015)
- Genuine Plastic Reliquaries (2015)
- The Grand Paradise (2016)
- As Time Goes By (2016)
- The Last Boat (2016)
- Sweet & Lucky (2016)
- Learning Curve (2016)
- Ghost Light (2017)
- Between Yourself and Me (2017)
- Grove (2017)
- Wolves in the Walls (2018)
- Medicine Show (2018)
- Behind the City (2018)
- Oasis (2019)
- This Between Shadow (2019)
- Stanzas (2019)
- Confection (2019)
- Midsummer: A Banquet (2019)
- Ikaros (2019)
- Adventure Lab (2020)
- Return the Moon (2021)
- The Night Garden (2022)
- Port of Entry (2023-present)
- UN-[TITLED] (2023)
- Calder Moves (2023)
- Yours to Lose (2024)
- True Love Forever (2025)
- Sweet and Lucky:Echo (2025)

== Awards ==
Third Rail Projects has been the recipient of several awards, including two Bessie Awards, a Chita Rivera Award for Choreography; fellowship awards including two CEC Artslink Back Apartment Residencies (Russia), a Theater Fellowship from the Bogliasco Foundation (Italy), and an artist residency from The Emily Harvey Foundation (Italy); a National Performance Network (NPN) Creation and Development Fund award; and others. Third Rail Projects was recognized as part of the creative team of the Peabody and Emmy Award-winning virtual reality adaptation of Wolves in the Walls.

== See also ==
- Site-specific theatre
- Postmodern theatre
- Site-specific performance
- Contemporary dance
