= The Grand Paradise =

Immersive theatre show by Third Rail Projects

The Grand Paradise was an interactive, site-specific immersive theater show created, directed, and choreographed by Third Rail Projects, under artistic directors Tom Pearson, Zach Morris, and Jennine Willett. The production ran from January to December 2016 in a custom 5,000 square-foot warehouse in Bushwick, Brooklyn.

Set in a fictional 1970s tropical resort that purported to house the Fountain of Youth, the performance combined dance, installation art, beverages, scents, and individual one-on-one encounters between performers and audiences.

== Premise and format ==
Audience members entered the venue as guests visiting a 1970s Florida resort run by a group of performers. Upon arrival, visitors received leis and tropical drinks before exploring the space on their own.

Each performance hosted up to 60 audience members alongside a cast of 20 performers. The warehouse contained multiple rooms, an indoor sand beach, a disco lounge, guest hotel rooms, and a large water aquarium. Visitors could follow individual performers throughout different rooms or explore the set independently.

The directors also used scent design, props, beverages, touch, music, and movement to create the illusion of a tropical resort.

== Critical reception ==
Reviews for The Grand Paradise was generally positive, with critics pointing out its detailed set design and interactive format, alongside the unpredictable nature of its open layout.

Ben Brantley of The New York Times praised the show's 1970s atmosphere and its mix of nostalgic detail, calling it "an inspired idea" and saying the show "manages to summon romantic promise and regretful retrospection in a single, ocean-air breath." Adam Feldman of Time Out New York gave the show a four-star review, characterizing it as "a captivatingly sensual interactive adventure."

Commentators also discussed the trade-offs of the show's grander scale compared to Third Rail Projects' earlier, smaller-scale works like Then She Fell. Critics for The Huffington Post and New York Theater mentioned that while individual actor interactions were intimate, the open format meant that different audience members saw entirely different scenes and storylines depending on where they walked or which performers they followed.

Additional coverage in Bedford + Bowery and the Asbury Park Press similarly highlighted the way different audience choices made for different experiences of the work.
