= Oculus Quill =

Virtual reality painting software

Quill by Smoothstep
- Developer: Smoothstep
- Initial release: November 29, 2016
- Operating system: Windows 10 or later
- Available in: English
- Type: 3D computer graphics
- Website: quill.art

Quill is a painting and animation software for virtual reality. It runs on Microsoft Windows with Oculus Rift headsets. It is used to create 3D paintings and animated cartoons.

Quill was released on November 29, 2016, on the Oculus Store. Theater Elsewhere(formerly Quill Theater), an application for viewing creations made in Quill, was later made available following the release of the Oculus Quest.

In September 2021, Facebook, now known as Meta Platforms, and the owner of Oculus, sold Quill to its original creator, who continues to develop and support the app.

== Development ==
Quill was originally developed by Oculus Story Studio as an internal tool for the creative needs of the studio's project Dear Angelica directed by Saschka Unseld along with its art-director Wesley Allsbrook.

== Controls ==
The software works on Oculus Rift utilizing its 6DoF motion controllers. Users can paint in 3D space using their hands naturally, and animate those paintings with keyframes. They can also capture videos and photos of their creations.

== Reception ==
Dear Angelica, a VR story fully painted in Quill, was nominated for an Emmy Award in 2017.
