= The Wolves in the Walls =

2003 graphic novel by Gaiman and McKean

- Author: Neil Gaiman
- Illustrator: Dave McKean
- Language: English
- Genre: Children's
- Publisher: HarperCollins
- Publication date: 5 August 2003
- Publication place: United States
- Media type: Hardcover
- Pages: 56
- ISBN: 0-380-97827-X

The Wolves in the Walls is a book by Neil Gaiman and Dave McKean, published in 2003, in the United States by HarperCollins, and in the United Kingdom by Bloomsbury. The book was highly praised on release, winning three awards for that year. In 2006, it was made into a musical which toured the UK and visited the US in 2007.

Neil Gaiman has said the story was inspired by a nightmare his daughter Maddy, then aged 4, had that there were wolves in the walls. In the story the protagonist, Lucy, hears wolves in the walls of her family's house, but her family does not believe her until one day when the wolves come out of the walls. The book is notable for Dave McKean's art, which utilises many different techniques, including photography, computer-generated imagery and drawing to achieve its effect.

It is also available in Spanish, German and Italian.

== Reception ==
The book was very well received, with positive reviews for both the text and art. It won awards for The New York Times Best Illustrated Children's Book (2003), the IRA/CBC Children's Choice (2004) award and the British Science Fiction Association award for Short Fiction (2003).

== Adaptations ==
=== Stage adaptation ===
In 2006 The Wolves in the Walls was adapted for stage, as a "Musical Pandemonium" of the same name, with music by Nick Powell to which Neil Gaiman contributed some lyrics. It was co-produced by the National Theatre of Scotland and Improbable theatre, and premiered at the Tramway in Glasgow in March, before touring the UK for the rest of the year, winning TMA Best Show for Children and Young People for 2006. In October 2007 it was staged in New York, off Broadway at the New Victory Theater, for a two-week run. The production was very well received.

=== VR adaptation ===
In January 2018, a Wolves in the Walls VR adaptation was released for Oculus Rift and Oculus Rift S headsets by Fable Studio, a venture headed by Edward Saatchi and Pete Billington and staffed by former employees of Oculus Story Studio, as its premiere title. Developed in collaboration with Third Rail Projects, which provided choreography and experience design, the project utilized immersive theater techniques within virtual reality.

The VR adaptation was well-received, and in August 2019, Wolves in the Walls won a Primetime Emmy for outstanding innovation in interactive media, and a Peabody Award in 2022. A second chapter of Wolves in the Walls, It's All Over, premiered at the April 2019 Tribeca Film Festival, and a third and final chapter, They're Everywhere, released in November of the same year. All three chapters were ported to Oculus Quest in November 2020. The VR adaption received a 2022 Peabody Award in the Immersive & Interactive category.
