= Justin Lewis (entrepreneur) =

American software designer and entrepreneur

- Born: March 20, 1986 (age 39); Douglas, Georgia, United States
- Education: Coffee High School; Valdosta State University
- Occupation(s): Entrepreneur, chief technology officer
- Known for: Co-founder of NationalField; Featured in Forbes 30 Under 30
- Website: nationalfield.com

Justin Lewis is an American software designer and entrepreneur, and one of the founders of NationalField, a software company that makes private social networks.

== Early life and education ==
Justin Terrell Lewis was born on March 20, 1986, in Douglas, Georgia. He graduated from Coffee High School and enrolled at Valdosta State University as a computer science major. He left VSU in 2008 while working on the presidential campaign of then-senator Barack Obama.

== Career ==
Lewis's work with the Obama campaign led him to meet Aharon Wasserman and Edward Saatchi. The three co-founded NationalField, an enterprise social network company, to more easily keep track of campaign data and coordinate communications between managers, staff, and volunteers. He currently serves as the company's Chief Technology Officer. In 2011, Lewis was named in Forbes magazine's 30 Under 30. Prior to leaving VSU, Justin worked at the school's IT department.
