= Ghost Light (play) =

Ghost Light (2017) by Third Rail Projects at Lincoln Center's Claire Tow Theater

Ghost Light was a 2017 immersive theater performance by the New York-based performance collective Third Rail Projects and presented by LCT3 at Lincoln Center Theater's Claire Tow Theater in New York City. Conceived, directed, and choreographed by Zach Morris and Jennine Willett, the work explored the superstitions, stage magic, and backstage rituals of theatrical traditions.

== Synopsis and staging ==
Unlike traditional stage plays, Ghost Light invited small audience groups to navigate the backstage corridors, dressing rooms, and hidden spaces of the Claire Tow Theater. Taking its name from the single light bulb left illuminated onstage when a theater is dark, the roughly two-hour production presented a series of dreamlike vignettes that examined performance, memory, and the unseen labor of stagecraft. Audience members were asked to stand, walk, navigate tight spaces, and interact with performers. The set was designed by Brett J. Banakis, with costume design by Montana Levi Blanco, lights by Eric Southern, and sound/composition by Sean Hagerty and Isaiah Singer.

== Reception and awards ==
Ghost Light premiered on June 3, 2017, and ran to August 6, 2017. It was named a New York Times Critic's Pick, with chief theater critic Ben Brantley describing it as "a spectral tour of the hoary legends, superstitions, and rituals that remain sacrosanct in the hearts of even the most jaded playmakers." Writing for The Washington Post, Peter Marks called the show a "dreamscape of backstage lore" that unfolds through the theater's hidden corridors and dressing rooms. In a review for The Village Voice, critic Elizabeth Zimmer praised Ghost Light as a "romance for theater geeks" and described it as a "performance about performance" that successfully honors the labor, technical craftsmanship, and physical execution required of backstage crews and stagehands.

Additional coverage praised the production's atmospheric intimacy and immersive design, including reviews by WNYC and New York Magazine (which featured the show in its "Approval Matrix"). Dance critic Eva Yaa Asantewaa of InfiniteBody commended the work on its staging and choreographic depth.

Ghost Light was honored with a Chita Rivera Award for Outstanding Choreography in an Off-Broadway Show.
