= Daus (surname) =

Daus is a surname. Notable people with the surname include:

- Joshard Daus (born 1947), German choral conductor
- Matthew W. Daus, American lawyer and vehicular commissioner
- Ronald Daus (born 1943), German university professor
- Rudolphe Daus (1854–1916), American architect

== See also ==
- Dau (surname)
