= Aharon Wasserman =

American entrepreneur and software designer

- Born: December 11, 1986 (age 38); Bridgeton, New Jersey, United States
- Education: Rutgers–New Brunswick (Political Science, did not finish)
- Occupation(s): Entrepreneur, chief product officer
- Known for: Co-founder of NationalField; Featured in Forbes 30 Under 30
- Website: nationalfield.com

Aharon Wasserman (born December 11, 1986) is an American entrepreneur and software designer. He currently serves as the vice president of creative and marketing for NGP VAN, the data company at the center of the Democratic Party's technology infrastructure. He co-founded NationalField, a company started on the Barack Obama 2008 presidential campaign to help monitor the daily activities of the sprawling grassroots effort with Justin Lewis and Edward Saatchi.

== Early life and education ==
Wasserman was born to Keith Wasserman and Betsy Riley-Wasserman in Bridgeton, New Jersey. He studied political science at the New Brunswick campus of Rutgers University, but left before graduation to devote himself full-time to Barack Obama's 2008 presidential campaign. Despite rumors that he is the nephew of the chair of the Democratic National Committee, Debbie Wasserman Schultz, Wasserman has stated that they are not related.

== Career ==
While working for the Obama campaign, Wasserman attained the position of deputy field director in Georgia and regional field director in Ohio. His duties put him into contact with fellow volunteers, Justin Lewis and Edward Saatchi. Sharing a frustration with the cumbersome task of tallying voter registration and keeping track of other campaign data, the three created a software platform that allowed them to more easily manage communications within their teams. The system quickly became popular and was eventually adopted in multiple branches of the campaign, leading to its present commercial form, NationalField. Wasserman served as the company's president and chief product officer until its acquisition by NGP VAN. In 2011, he and the other co-founders were named in Forbes magazine's 30 Under 30.

On November 14, 2014, NationalField was acquired by NGP VAN.
