= Then She Fell =

Immersive theatre production

- Written by: Third Rail Projects
- Music by: Sean Hagerty
- Genre: Immersive theatre

Premiere
- Date: October 6, 2012
- Place: Former Greenpoint Hospital, Greenpoint, Brooklyn
- Directed by: Zach Morris, Tom Pearson, Jennine Willett
- Original run: October 6, 2012 to March 8, 2020
- thenshefell.com

Then She Fell was an off-off-Broadway immersive theater production conceived, directed, written, and choreographed by Third Rail Projects directors Zach Morris, Tom Pearson, and Jennine Willett. Inspired by the life and writings of Lewis Carroll, the production was set a fictional institutional environment and combined elements of dance, interactive performance, and installation art. Then She Fell premiered on October 6, 2012 for a limited run at Arts@Rennaisance, in Greenpoint, Brooklyn. It reopened in 2013 at Kingsland Ward at St. John's in Williamsburg, Brooklyn, where it ran until closing in March 2020.

== Synopsis and structure ==
Then She Fell explored the relationship between author Lewis Carroll and Alice Liddell, the young girl who inspired Alice's Adventures in Wonderland and Through the Looking Glass, alongside themes of memory, obsession, and Victorian institutionalization. The audience was limited to 15 attendees per performance. Upon entry, guests were invited into a multi-room environment styled as a 19th-century asylum. Attendees were separated throughout the performance and led through a combination of one-on-one encounters with actors, small group scenes, and interactive exploration of physical environments. Performances incorporated food and beverage and interactive movement sequences.

== Development and history ==
The production was created by Third Rail Projects, an American performance company known for site-specific immersive work. Artistic Directors Zach Morris, Tom Pearson, and Jennine Willett developed the piece in collaboration with the original cast members Elizabeth Carena, Alberto Denis, Stacie C. Tobar, Rebekah Morin, Marissa Nielsen-Pincus, Tara O'Con, and Zoë Schieber. It premiered on October 6, 2012 for a limited run at Arts@Renaissance, a converted arts space in a wing of the former Greenpoint Hospital in Greenpoint, Brooklyn. In 2013, the production reopened at the Kingsland Ward at St. John's, a former mental hospital in Williamsburg, Brooklyn, where it ran until March 2020.

After a run of more than seven years and 4,444 performances, the production suspended operations in March 2020 during the COVID-19 pandemic and subsequently announced its permanent closure.

== Critical reception ==
Then She Fell received widespread critical praise for its atmospheric design, choreography, and intimate audience interaction. The New York Times designated the show a "Critic's Pick," with chief theater critic Ben Brantley describing it as occupying "a dreamscape where the judgements and classifications of the waking mind are inoperative, and where the single self keeps splitting and blurring." Dance critic Siobhan Burke, also writing for The New York Times, highligted the production's "exacting, exhuberant choregraphy." Brantley later named the production to his list of top 10 theater events of 2012.

Adam Green of Vogue named the show among the best in theater for 2013, calling it "haunting, hallucinatory, and profoundly intimate." Writing for Time, Richard Zoglin characterized the work as "extreme theater: fresh, fun, totally absorbing." The New Yorker called the work "wildly imaginative." Time Out New York, Gothamist, and Backstage praised the production's intimate audience experience, dramaturgical examination of the life and works of Lewis Carroll, and "luscious and meticulously designed world". In 2013, it won the Bessie Award for Outstanding Production (awarded to creators Zach Morris, Tom Pearson, and Jennine Willet of Third Rail Projects).
