= Edward Saatchi =

British software entrepreneur

The Honourable Edward Saatchi
- Born: 19 February 1985 (age 41)
- Education: Westminster School
- Alma mater: Wadham College, Oxford; Sorbonne
- Occupation: Businessman
- Known for: Co-founder of NationalField and Fable Studio
- Parent(s): Maurice Saatchi; Josephine Hart
- Website: fable-studio.com

Edward Saatchi (born 19 February 1985) is a British businessman. He is the chief executive officer (CEO) of artificial intelligence-powered virtual being company Fable. He was formerly a producer at Oculus Story Studio and the CEO and co-founder of political technology company, NationalField.

== Early life and education ==
Edward Saatchi is the son of Maurice Saatchi and Josephine Hart. His father is an Iraqi Jew born in Baghdad while his mother was Irish. He was educated at London's Westminster School and Wadham College in Oxford, where he took a double first in English Studies. He attended the Sorbonne for graduate studies in philosophy and economics, before leaving for the United States to volunteer for Barack Obama's 2008 presidential campaign.

== Career ==
Saatchi was initially rejected in his efforts to join the Obama campaign because of his alien status, but was eventually permitted to participate after personally presenting himself at a campaign office in Iowa. During his tenure with the campaign, he met Aharon Wasserman and Justin Lewis. The three developed an "internal social network" to more easily keep track of campaign data and coordinate communications between managers, staff, and volunteers. The network was rapidly adopted across multiple branches of the campaign and eventually commercialised in its present form as NationalField. He is the company's CEO. In 2011, Saatchi, along with his co-founders, was named in a Forbes's 30 Under 30 list.

In 2014, he was part of the founding team of Oculus Story Studio, the virtual-reality filmmaking division of Oculus VR.

=== Fable Studio ===
In January 2018, Saatchi co-founded Fable studio with Pete Billington. Its premier title was a virtual reality film titled Wolves in the Walls, based on the Neil Gaiman and Dave McKean children's book of the same name.

Im May 2023, Fable Studio announced an AI project titled "The Simulation", which plans to create a simulated reality of AI-powered characters with the eventual goal of creating an artificial general intelligence. In July 2023 as part of The Simulation project, Fable Studio released a paper describing their tool named AI Showrunner that can create full animated TV episodes. In June 2024, Fable Studio announced a streaming service, based on their AI tool and also titled Showrunner, that will allow users to create their own episodes.

== Personal life ==
Saatchi told Forbes in 2014 that he practises Transcendental Meditation, rises before dawn, exercises daily and enjoys films and painting.
