= Philip Rosedale =

American entrepreneur (born 1968)

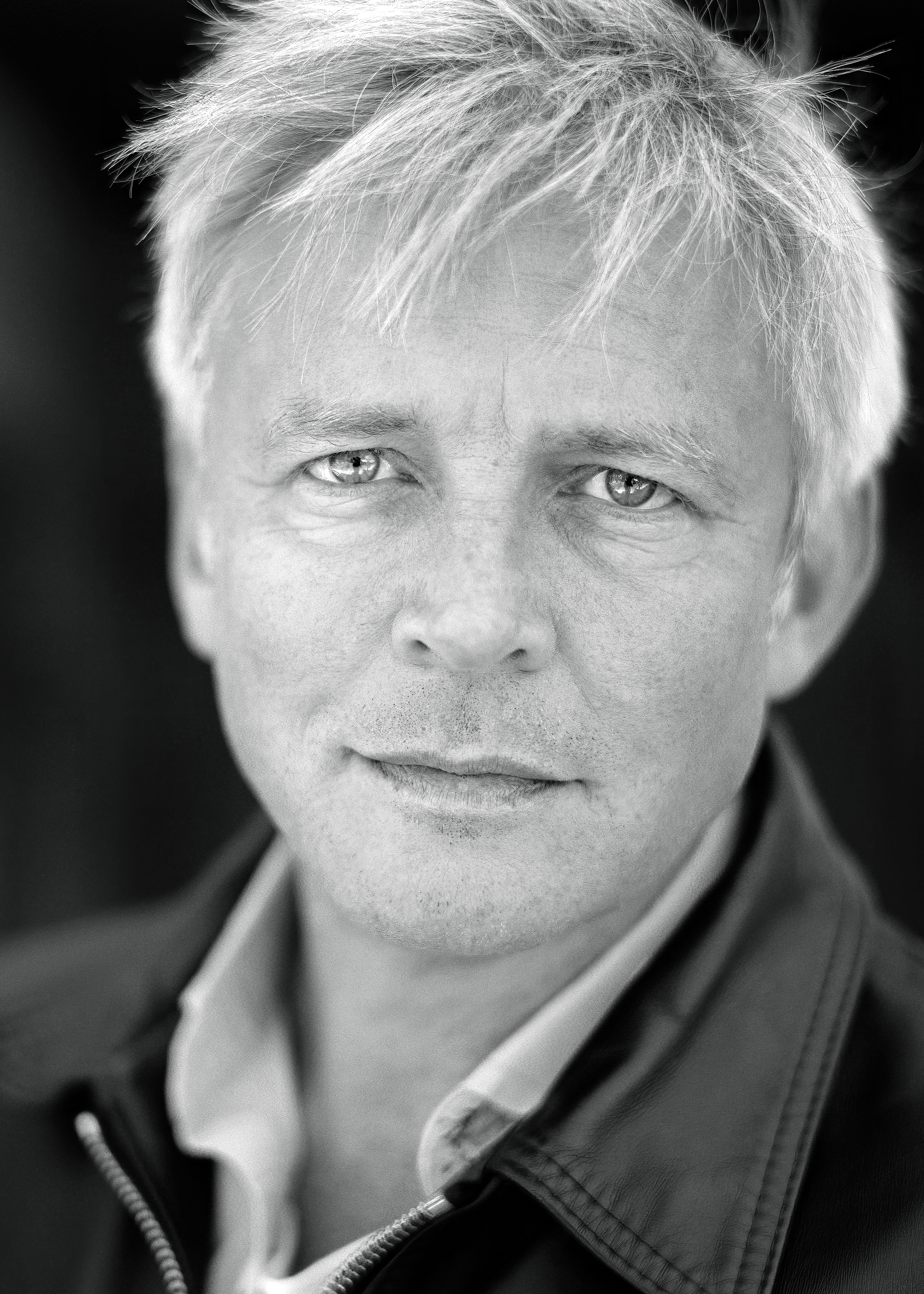
- Rosedale in 2021
- Born: September 29, 1968 (age 58); San Diego, California, United States
- Education: University of California, San Diego
- Occupation: CEO at High Fidelity, Inc.
- Known for: Founder of Linden Lab and High Fidelity, Inc.

Philip Rosedale (born September 29, 1968) is an American entrepreneur who founded Linden Lab, which develops and hosts the virtual world Second Life.

== Biography ==
=== Early life ===
Rosedale was born in San Diego, California, in 1968. He took an interest in computers, technology, and virtual reality from an early age. He earned a Bachelor of Science degree in physics and computer science from the University of California, San Diego.

=== Career ===
In 1995, Rosedale created an Internet video conferencing product (called "FreeVue"), which was later acquired by RealNetworks, where (in 1996) he went on to become vice president and chief technology officer. A year later Rosedale left RealNetworks and founded Linden Lab, named after a street in Hayes Valley (a neighborhood in San Francisco). With the creation of Second Life, he fulfilled his lifelong dream of creating an Internet-scale virtual world. In 2006, he and Linden Lab received WIRED's Rave Award for Innovation in Business. On March 14, 2008, Rosedale announced he would be stepping down as the CEO of Linden Lab and assuming the role of Chairman of the Board of Directors.

Rosedale had stated that his goal with Second Life was to demonstrate a viable model for a virtual economy or virtual society. In his own words: "We don't see this as a game. We see it as a platform that is, in many ways, better than the real world" (Google TechTalks, March 2006).

In 2007, Philip Rosedale was named one of Time Magazine's 100 Most Influential People in The World.

In 2008, Linden Lab's Second Life was one of three products to win a Technology & Engineering Emmy Award in the category of "User Generated Content – Game Modification".

In October 2009, Rosedale announced that he would be less involved in the development of Second Life, because he was focusing on a new project. The announced project turned out to be a company named LoveMachine Inc, founded with Ryan Downe.

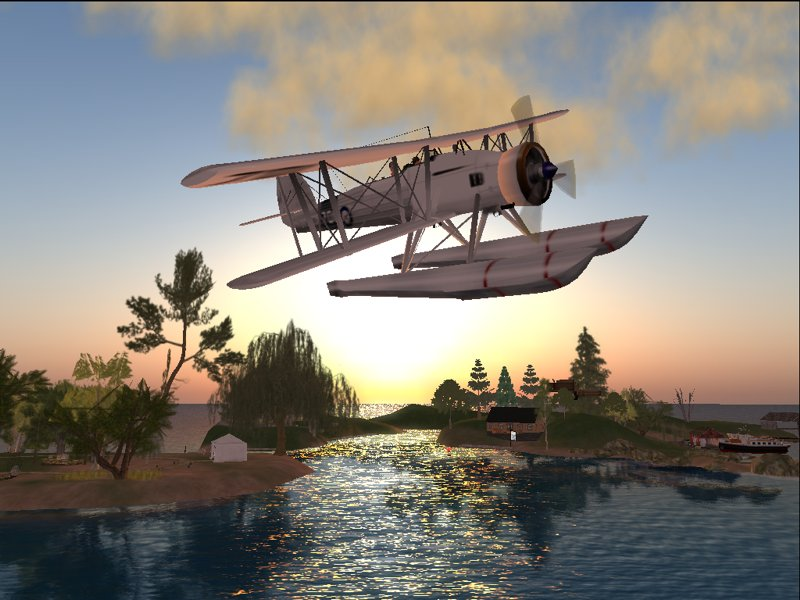
Scenery from Second Life in 2012

In June 2010, he announced that he was back to the office as CEO of Linden Lab. However, in October 2010, Rosedale announced he was leaving his position as interim CEO.

In November 2011, Rosedale released a new project named Coffee and Power, a site that Rosedale calls a "meta-company", that enables people to connect for small jobs and services. On April 16, 2013, Coffee & Power posted to their company blog that they were going to stop work on Workclub, their mobile application and begin work on a new company named High Fidelity Inc.

In January 2022, High Fidelity acquired an interest in Linden Research and Philip Rosedale rejoined Second Life as a strategic advisor.

On 29 October 2024, Second Life announced that Philip Rosedale had become full-time chief technology officer (CTO), a board room level position within the company.

== Personal life ==
Philip Rosedale is married to Yvette Forte Rosedale. He lives in San Francisco, and has four children.
