= Providence Steel and Iron Company Complex =

- U.S. National Register of Historic Places
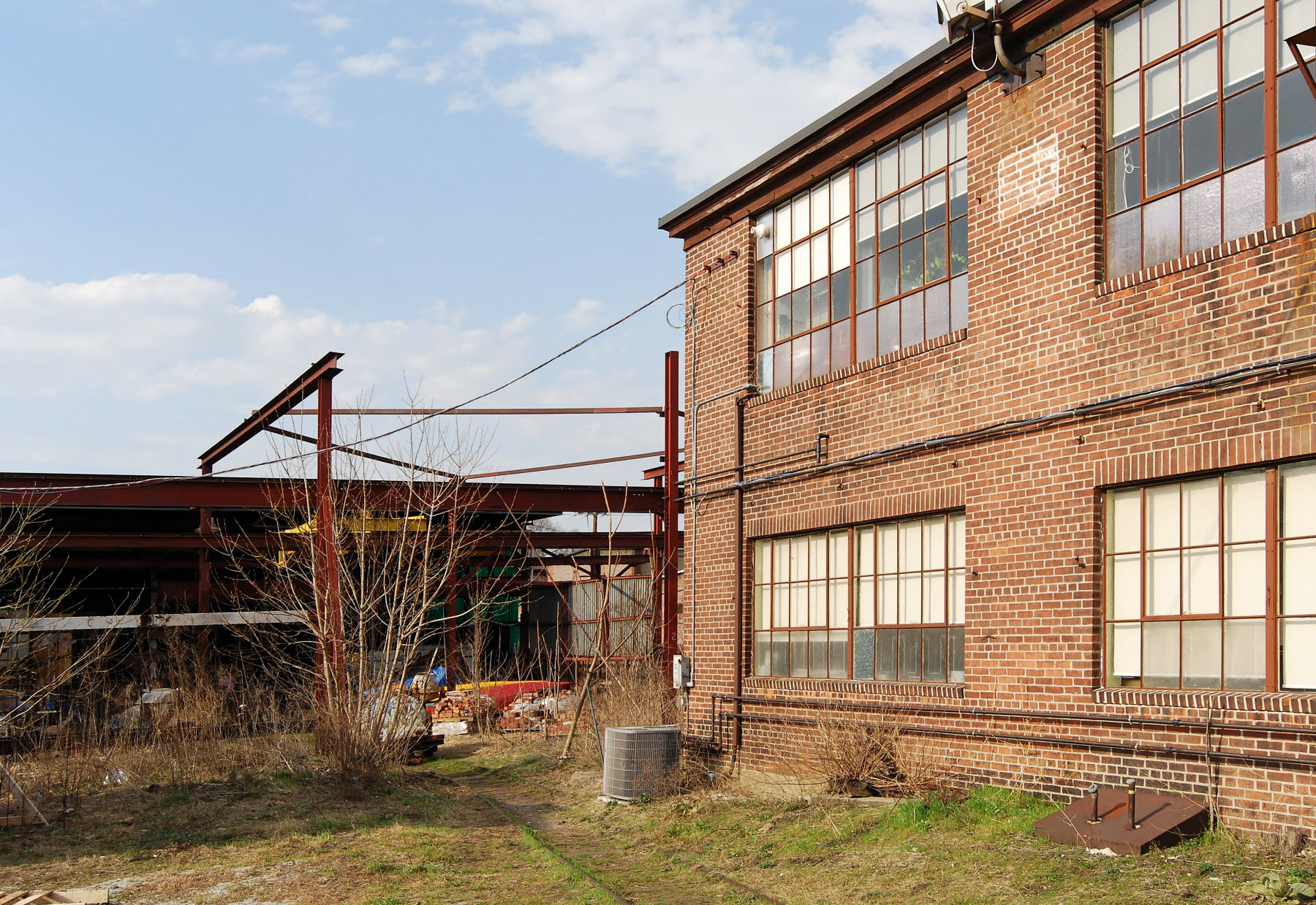

- Location within Rhode Island Location within the United States
- Location: Providence, Rhode Island
- Coordinates: 41°49′34″N 71°26′5″W
- Built: 1902
- Architect: Houlihan & Maguire; Dwight Seabury Company
- NRHP reference No.: 05000919
- Added to NRHP: August 24, 2005

The Providence Steel and Iron Company Complex is an historic industrial complex at 27 Sims Avenue in Providence, Rhode Island. It consists of five one and two-story buildings, built between 1902 and 1951 for the Providence Steel and Iron Company (PS&I), whose corporate lineage begins with the Providence-based Builders Iron Foundry (BIF) in 1822. BIF purchased the land on Sims Avenue in 1902 to replace old facilities on Codding Street. PS&I was established as a subsidiary of BIF, producing both structural and ornamental steel products, and was separated from its parent by sale in 1905. PS&I continued to operate on the Sims Street property until 2003, when it was sold to Milhaus LLC for redevelopment into a non-profit industrial arts facility, The Steel Yard. The property was listed on the National Register of Historic Places in 2005.

The Steel Yard hosts events like the annual Iron Pour, a public performance where artists cast molten metal in a theatrical display. Other community events include the Sims Ave Festival, where locals can explore industrial arts and connect with artists. In 2013, the Steel Yard won the Rudy Bruner Award for Urban Excellence silver medal for its adaptive reuse of the property. The Steel Yard temporarily closed in 2019 for renovations which included the installation of solar panels.

== See also ==
- National Register of Historic Places listings in Providence, Rhode Island
- The Rhode Island Council for the Humanities : Rhode Tour, PSI
- The Steel Yard official website
