= High Fidelity, Inc. =

American social virtual reality company

High Fidelity
- Type: Private
- Founded: 2013
- Headquarters: San Francisco, USA
- Key people: Philip Rosedale
- Website: highfidelity.com

High Fidelity is an American company headquartered in San Francisco, which formerly focused on social virtual reality. As of 2020, they appear to have pivoted to 3D audio software.

== Company ==
High Fidelity was founded in April 2013 by Second Life founder and former CEO Philip Rosedale, Ryan Downe Karpf, and Irena Freidrica Heiberger. The company was formed to create a next-generation virtual reality platform featuring low latency, spatialized 3D audio, high-detail environments, realistic avatars, and a working economy built on blockchain.

High Fidelity raised $2.4 million in early 2013, led by True Ventures and Google Ventures. In 2015, it raised an additional $11 million from Vulcan Capital, and in December 2016, it raised another $22 million in an investment round let by IDG Capital and Breyer Capital. In June 2018, it raised $35 million. The round was led by blockchain investment firm Galaxy Digital Ventures, which invested $20 million from its Galaxy EOS Ecosystem Fund. Other new investors included Blockchain Capital. Existing investors Breyer Capital, IDG Capital Partners, and Vulcan Capital also participated.

== Products ==
High Fidelity provided a virtual reality platform for users to create, deploy, visit, and interact with virtual worlds along with other users. These virtual spaces can host up to 500 people at once. The software is free and open source. It can be used with most VR headsets or a traditional monitor in desktop mode.

To promote commerce and protect content from forgery, digital assets in High Fidelity are certified on High Fidelity's blockchain-based Digital Asset Registry (DAR), which gives each item a unique fingerprint and provides a decentralized, publicly auditable ledger of transactions. Users can buy and sell virtual goods and services using High Fidelity's stablecoin cryptocurrency, High Fidelity Coin (HFC).

On April 27, 2016, High Fidelity entered open beta.

In July 2017, High Fidelity ordered six episodes of a VR talk-show titled Glitched: A VR Talk Show from Studio Capon and followed up with a weekly streamed dance party series in VR with DJ Tha Phlash.

In 2018, High Fidelity staged a speaker series featuring VR conversations between High Fidelity CEO Philip Rosedale and academics, futurists, and VR experts such as Jeremy Bailenson, Courtney Cogburn, Peter Diamandis, and Jessica Outlaw.

In November 2018, High Fidelity hosted FUTVRE LANDS, the first music and entertainment festival hosted completely in VR. The four-hour event brought together 466 avatars from 47 countries and included live entertainment from actors, artists, and musicians across multiple stages in a virtual festival venue. High Fidelity advisor Thomas Dolby performed a live concert set. Other attractions included live art, bingo, trivia, and limited-edition festival merchandise to buy and download from High Fidelity's marketplace.

Plans for gatherings on the High Fidelity platform to use virtual reality were scrapped by the beginning of 2019, and the platform became audio-only. Users appear as dots in a birds-eye view of a space, and can move their dots around the space to have conversations with individuals or groups. Audio is spatialized, so that users will hear other users at different volumes depending on their relative locations within the space.

In March 2019, High Fidelity hosted Multi-Con, a comic con inspired VR event featuring cosplay, fanart, and celebrity panelists. Kari Byron, Tory Belleci, and Grant Imahara, the stars of Emmy-nominated MythBusters, hosted a panel and shared stories from MythBusters with the audience. James Arnold Taylor, voice actor of Fred Flintstone and Obi-Wan, debuted his show “Talking to Myself” in VR at Multi-Con.

In May 2019, High Fidelity announced it would focus its efforts on an application for remote and distributed teams. The yet-to-be-named application, accessible through both desktop mode and VR, provides a virtual space where people can collaborate using High Fidelity's spatialized 3D audio and realistic avatars.

Interest in High Fidelity's virtual meeting platform ballooned during the COVID-19 pandemic.

In January 2022, High Fidelity announced an investment in Linden Research, Inc. (Linden Lab) to scale Second Life's virtual world further.
