= Fable Studio =

Media company

Fable Studio is an American startup media company founded in January 2018 by Edward Saatchi and Pete Billington. It specializes in virtual reality media and uses generative AI to develop "The Simulation", a simulated reality; and Showrunner, a streaming platform that can generate custom episodes.

== History ==
=== Wolves in the Walls ===
In January 2018, Fable Studio launched, with Wolves in the Walls as its premiere VR title. The property was based on the Neil Gaiman and Dave McKean children's book of the same name. In August 2019, Wolves in the Walls won a Primetime Emmy for outstanding innovation in interactive media.

=== The Simulation ===
In May 2023, Fable Studio announced an AI project titled "The Simulation", which plans to create a simulated reality of AI-powered characters with the eventual goal of creating an artificial general intelligence. The Simulation's official website is entirely fabricated.

In July 2023, as part of The Simulation project, Fable Studio released a paper describing SHOW-1, also known as AI Showrunner, a tool which uses a complex network of AI agents to create full animated TV episodes. They showcased the technology by creating several unauthorized episodes of South Park, inspired by an episode of that show about characters using ChatGPT. Saatchi described the potential to create a "generative TV" service where fans can create and share their own episodes, and where writers and directors can realize their own original projects.

SHOW-1 was heavily criticized by the Writers Guild of America and SAG-AFTRA, who were on strike at the time over the risk of their careers getting automated. Film, TV, and comic-book writer Christos Gage described the SHOW-1–generated episodes as "soulless and unfunny". Devin Coldewey of TechCrunch, in contrast, said of one of the episodes, "Although I wouldn't say the episode is funny, it does have a beginning, a middle and an end, and distinct characters (including lots of fake celebrity cameos, including fake Meryl Streep."

=== Showrunner ===
According to Fable Studio, Showrunner will allow users to create a custom episode given a plot, scene descriptions, and more specific elements like dialogue and shots.

In June 2024, Fable Studio announced Showrunner, a streaming service on which users could create and share their own episodes using AI in a similar format as the South Park demos. Ten original series were announced for the platform, including Exit Valley, a Silicon Valley satire modeled after South Park; Ikiru Shinu, a post-apocalyptic horror anime; and Sim Francisco, an anthology series set in a shared universe of some of the other shows.

=== Public launch and Amazon investment ===
In July 2025, Fable Studio publicly launched Showrunner in alpha, following a closed alpha test involving 10,000 users. The platform is powered by Fable's proprietary SHOW-2 AI model, successor to the SHOW-1 model used in the South Park demos. The launch coincided with an investment from Amazon's Alexa Fund, in addition to earlier funding from Day One Ventures, 8VC, and Greycroft; coverage of the launch widely referred to Showrunner as the "Netflix of AI." At the time of launch, the company had approximately 15 employees and was based in San Francisco's Mission District.

Under Showrunner's business model, viewing generated content is free, while users pay a subscription — reported at between $10 and $40 per month — for credits to generate scenes and episodes, insert themselves as characters, or build on existing shows. Creators reportedly receive a share of revenue, cited as around 40%, when others remix or build upon their original content. Initial access to the platform was via the Discord messaging platform.

=== Studio licensing discussions ===
Saatchi stated that Showrunner had reached a licensing agreement with one unnamed studio at launch and was in discussions with several major Hollywood studios, including Disney, about licensing intellectual property so that users could legally create derivative content within established franchises; under the proposed model, studios would receive a share of user spending. As of early 2026, no formal agreement with Disney or another major studio had been publicly announced.

=== Upcoming projects ===
Fable has announced a "playable" film titled *Everything Is Fine*, planned for release in 2026.
