= Immersive theater =

Theater modality in which audiences are immersed within the performance itself

Audience members watching an immersive theater scene in a 2014 Secret Cinema performance of Back to the Future, with actors fighting in the foreground

Immersive theater is a style of performance that removes the traditional separation between the audience and the performers, commonly referred to as the "fourth wall." Unlike conventional theater where spectators sit in fixed seating facing a stage, immersive theater places audience members inside the physical environment of the performance. Spectators are often granted varying degrees of agency to explore the space, interact with the performers, and choose their own narrative path through the space.

== Key characteristics ==
While individual productions vary in scope and style, immersive theater typically features several defining elements:

- Removal of the Fourth Wall: Audience members share the physical space with actors rather than watching from traditional auditorium seating.
- Audience agency and non-linear narrative: Spectators sometimes choose which characters to follow, which rooms to explore, or how to navigate the story.
- Site-specific and multi-room staging: Productions convert nontraditional venues—such as warehouses, historic buildings, or commercial spaces—into detailed sensory environments.
- Distinction from interactive theater: While immersive theater alters the physical environment, it does not always direct audience interaction, distinguishing environmental immersion from purely participatory or game-based performance.

== Immersive theater companies ==
=== Punchdrunk ===
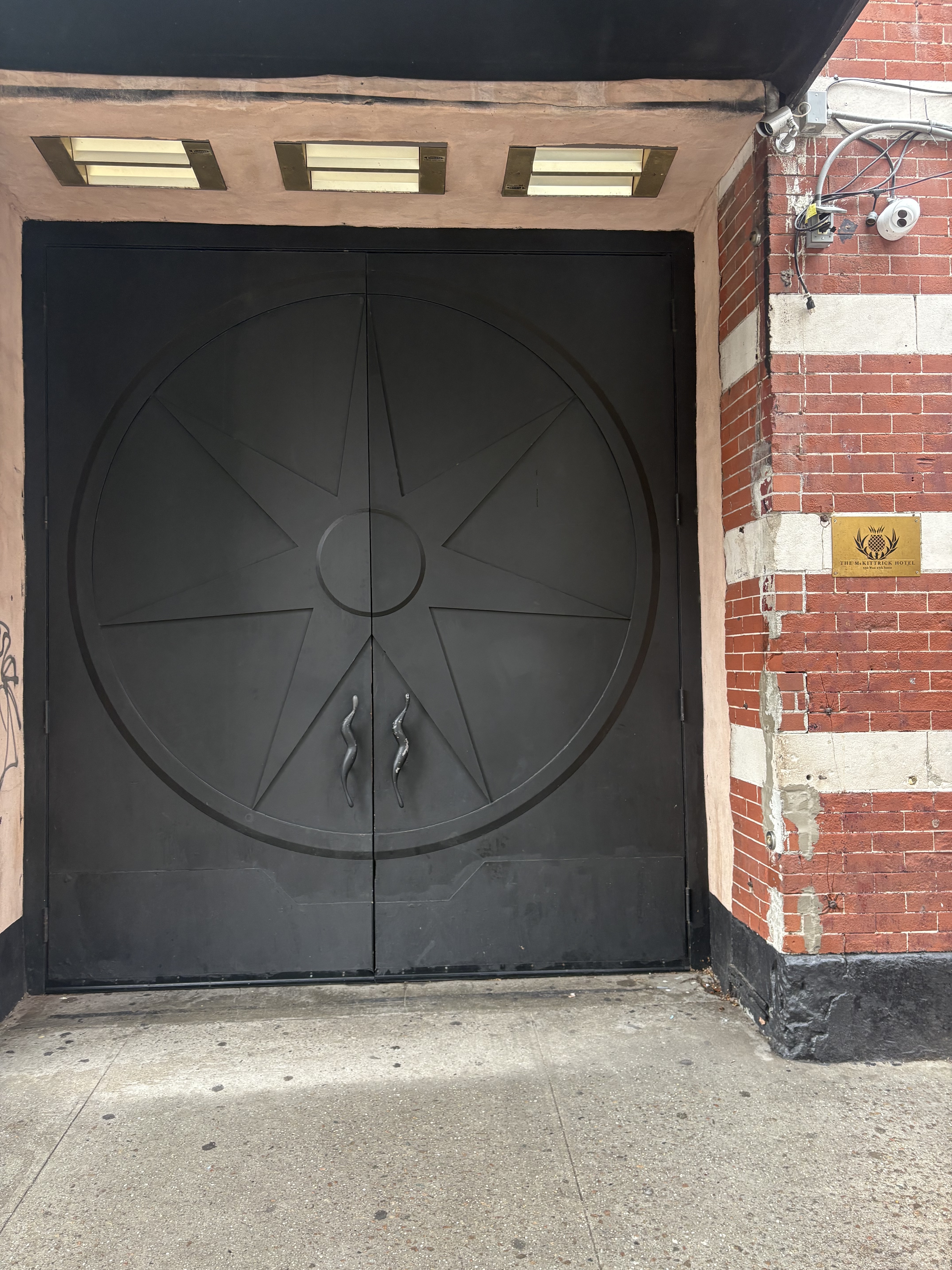
The entrance to the fictional McKittrick Hotel in Punchdrunk's New York production of Sleep No More

Punchdrunk is a British theater company founded in 2000 by Felix Barrett. Their debut production that year was an adaptation of Georg Büchner's Woyzeck, set in an abandoned army barracks. The staging established core conventions of Punchdrunk's model, including the repurposing of large disused or industrial structures, non-linear physical exploration, and the requirement that audience members wear specialized theatrical masks to encourage anonymity. Subsequent major productions included adaptations of Faust (2006) and Edgar Allan Poe's The Masque of the Red Death (2007).

Punchdrunk achieved international mainstream recognition with Sleep No More, a site-specific adaptation of William Shakespeare's Macbeth styled as a 1930s film noir. Following initial runs in London (2003) and Boston (2009), the production established long-running permanent installations at the McKittrick Hotel in New York City (2011) and the McKinnon Hotel in Shanghai (2016), the latter produced via Punchdrunk International in partnership with SMG Live. The company also co-produced the 2020 HBO/Sky Atlantic mystery television series The Third Day. Other major productions include The Drowned Man: A Hollywood Fable (2013), a massive 200,000-square-foot staging in a former postal sorting office, The Burnt City (2022), an epic adaptation of the Trojan War staged across two Woolwich arsenal buildings, and Viola's Room (2025).

=== Third Rail Projects ===
The entrance to the fictional Kingsland Ward in Third Rail Projects' New York production of Then She Fell

Third Rail Projects is a multi-disciplinary American performing arts company under the go-direction of Zach Morris, Tom Pearson and Jennine Willett, who have created site-specific work, immersive theater and experiential performances since 2005. Among more than 50 productions and projects, Third Rail Project's long-running show Then She Fell ran for 4,444 performances in New York City from 2012 until March 2020, when performances were suspended due to the COVID-19 pandemic. Other notable performances include Ghost Light (2017), The Grand Paradise (2016), and Vanishing Point (2008).

=== dreamthinkspeak ===
Dreamthinkspeak is a British site-specific theater company founded in 2003 by artistic director Tristan Sharps.The company is know for creating large-scale, architectural site-specific installations that convert non-traditional.buildings–such as disused department stores, paper factories, and hostoric spaces–into detailed multi-room performance environments Their major productions include Before I Sleep (2010), an immersive adaptation of Anton Checkhov's The Cherry Orchard staged inside a vacant Co-op department stire in Brighton, and The Rest Is Silence (2012), and adaptation of Shakespeare's Hamlet.

=== Secret Cinema ===
Secret Cinema's Back To the Future

Secret Cinema is a British entertainment company founded in 2007 by Fabien Riggall that specializes in immersive cinema and performance events. Combining film screenings with live theater, elaborate set design, actor interactions, and audience dress codes, the company recreates the fictional worlds from prominent films and television series inside large-scale abandoned or repurposed spaces. Major productions have included adaptations of Back to the Future (2014), The Empire Strikes Back (2015), Blade Runner (2018), and Casino Royale (2019), as well as television properties such as Stranger Things and Arcane. In September 2022, the company was acquired by digital ticketing firm TodayTix Group.

== Notable immersive theater productions ==
- Faulty Towers The Dining Experience (1997)
- Sleep No More (2011)
- Then She Fell (2012)
- Natasha, Pierre, and the Great Comet of 1812 (2013)
- Here Lies Love (2013)
- The Drowned Man: A Hollywood Fable (2013)
- The Grand Paradise (2016)
- Life and Trust (2024)
- Masquerade (2025)
