= Greenpoint Hospital =

Brooklyn hospital

Coordinates: 40°42′58″N 73°56′23″W

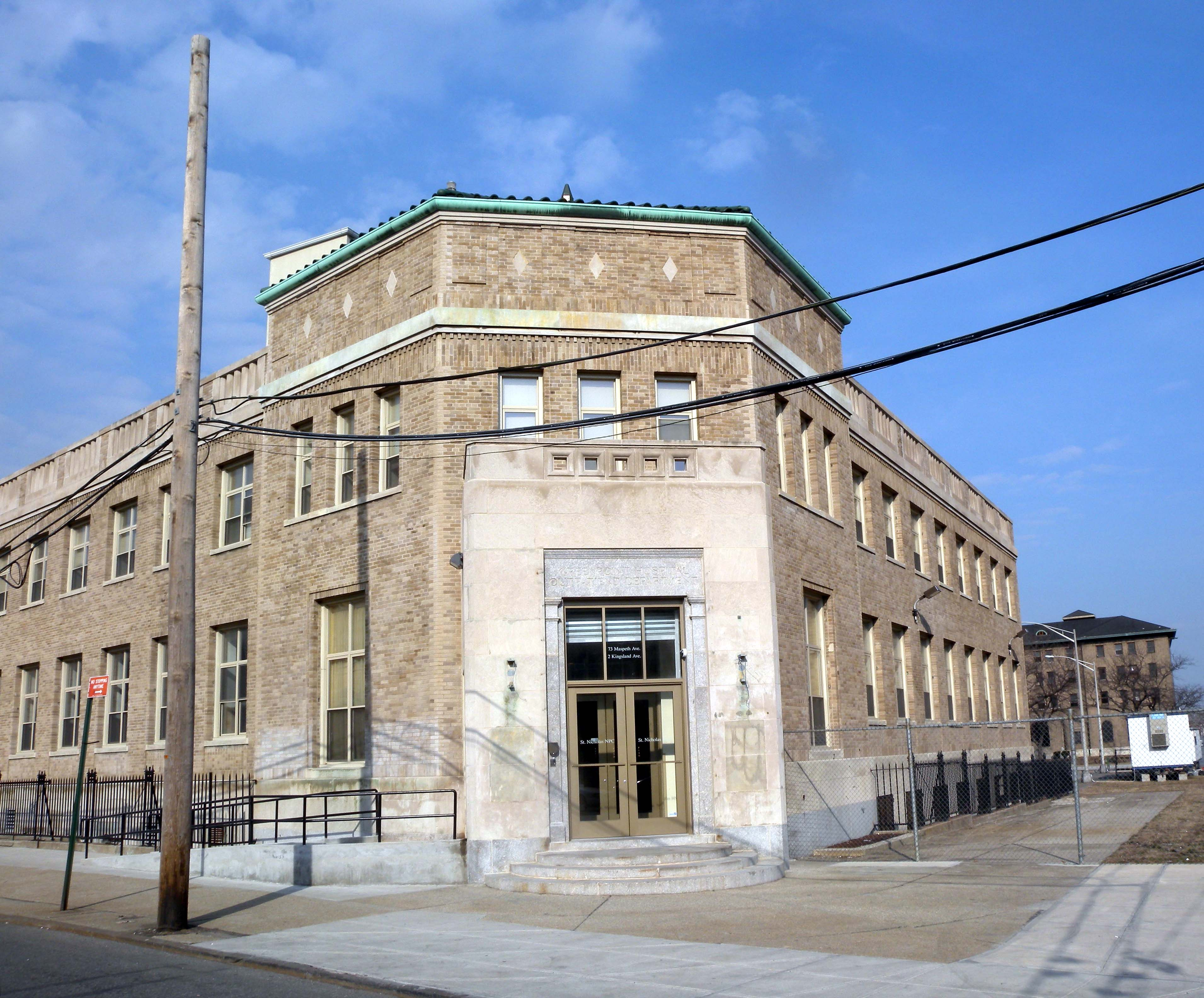
- Outpatient department of Greenpoint Hospital

Geography
- Location: 300 Skillman Avenue, Greenpoint, Brooklyn, New York, United States

Organization
- Care system: Public
- Type: General

History
- Founded: 1914
- Closed: 1982

Links
- Lists: Hospitals in New York State

Greenpoint Hospital was a hospital in Greenpoint, Brooklyn, New York, that operated from 1914 to 1982. Its closure was followed by use of its site for a homeless shelter and subsequent redevelopment plans.

== History ==
The hospital initially had six buildings. Talk in 1959 of closing part of the hospital pending "modernization" and a 1968 "crash program to remedy decaying conditions" were part of the hospital's last decades.

At the time of Greenpoint's closing, Woodhull Medical and Mental Health Center was deemed to be the community's replacement. Controversy over this matter existed since Woodhull "was completed in 1978 but stood empty for four years because the city said it could not afford to operate it." Even when it opened, it was noted that Woodhull is "five miles away." A subsequent study confirmed that "the amount of time it would take for a vehicle to reach Woodhull from various points in Greenpoint" averaged "just under 40 minutes."

The closing was followed by a series of unkept promises to the neighborhood: instead of a nursing home or senior housing, it became a shelter for homeless men, with the words "a dumping ground" used by neighborhood activists, particularly a 1970s-founded group named Neighborhood Women. It took eight years to reduce the number of men in the facility from "more than 1,100" to 200. By 2010 the city was still promising to use it for affordable housing. In 2016, although some units had been built, the New York Times summarized the situation as another promise: "more participants will bring fresh ideas for this valuable city land."

The hospital had been described as a "10-building complex" and many in the neighborhood claimed they "at least need a substation to keep our people alive in times of emergency." Money had been spent four years prior to build "an emergency wing" and the request resulted in a nine month study which asked "Can a 24-hour emergency facility maintain itself while the other buildings on the grounds are put to alternative uses?"

Greenpoint's closing was followed a year later by that of another neighborhood hospital, Cumberland, both of which were to be "an exchange" for over-half-an-hour-away Woodhull, "one of the most modern and expensive hospitals in the world." Another option to relocate and expand Greenpoint Hospital was explored in 1964.
