= Henry (2015 film) =

- Directed by: Ramiro Lopez Dau
- Narrated by: Elijah Wood
- Production company: Oculus Story Studio
- Release date: 2015
- Running time: 12 minutes

Henry is a 2015 virtual reality film created by Oculus Story Studio which was premiered on July 28, 2015. It was created in Unreal Engine 4 and narrated by Elijah Wood.

Henry won an Emmy Award for Outstanding Original Interactive Program in 2016.

== Plot ==
The film starts with the narrator (Elijah Wood) explaining that Henry is a hedgehog who has no friends because he likes to hug everyone. The viewer is then placed inside Henry's home on his birthday where, after a short time, Henry appears from the kitchen with his birthday cake. Sad at being alone on his birthday, Henry lights the candle on his cake and makes a wish before blowing it out. At this point, a group of animal balloons come to life and fly around the house, before one approaches Henry for a hug; the balloon pops as Henry tries to hug it. Terrified, the balloons dart around the room trying to escape from Henry before flying out of the door, leaving Henry alone. Shortly afterwards, a knock at the door reveals that the balloons have returned, bringing with them a turtle. The turtle hugs Henry, without being hurt by his quills, and Henry is happy again.

== Production ==
Oculus Story Studio began creation of Henry envisioning it as a comedy, eventually deciding to create a story that viewers would find engaging through their empathy for the main character, rather than from action or suspense. To achieve this, the creators made Henry look at the viewer during certain moments, especially those in which he is feeling strong emotions. The creators incorporated "discoverables" to make use of the virtual reality medium - if the viewer looks in particular directions small events will occur, such as a ladybug crawling into view.

Henry was created using Unreal Engine 4 but, following the creation of Lost, Oculus Story Studio moved from using the stock engine to modifying it to suit their requirements. Following the film's premiere, the studio publicly released the Unreal Engine code and assets used in its creation to aid other filmmakers.

== Release ==
The film premiered in Los Angeles on 28 July 2015, and was publicly released in early 2016.

== Reception ==
In Polygon, Ben Kuchera described Henry as "perfect for anyone who wants a gentle and warm introduction to virtual reality". Will Mason of UploadVR reviewed the film positively, particularly praising the emotional impact of Henry looking directly at the viewer.

Emily Yoshida of The Verge, however, found Henry disappointing, saying that she found herself "incredibly aware of, distracted, even, by [Henry's] status as a rendered object", preferring photorealistic or recorded VR films.

In 2016, Henry won an Emmy Award for Outstanding Original Interactive Program, the first Emmy awarded to an original virtual reality production.
