= Ryan Downe =

American musician and audio engineer

- Occupation: CCO at High Fidelity, Inc.
- Years active: 1990s–2007 (music career); 2013–present (CCO)
- Children: Underscores

Ryan Downe Karpf is an American musician and audio engineer. His debut album The Hypocrite was released in 1996 by Elton John's label, The Rocket Record Company. Two music videos were produced to promote this album: "Where Am I Gonna Run To" and "Scratch". Downe opened for both The Who and Iggy Pop during their 1997 tours. Later he and his guitarist Johannes Luley opened Freudenhaus Recording Studio in San Francisco. It was during this time that Downe is credited with co-engineering and playing/singing on the Grammy Award-nominated album, Arepa 3000, by Los Amigos Invisibles. Downe then joined up with Luley, keyboardist Tom Lynham, and drummer / co-lead-singer Matt Swindells to create the band Moth Vellum, with whom he released one album.

Downe is a co-founder and chief creative officer (CCO) at High Fidelity, Inc., an American social virtual reality company. He is the father of American musician Underscores.

== Discography ==
=== Solo album ===
- The Hypocrite (1996)

Track listing:

No.	Title	Length
1.	"Judas"
2.	"Vegas"
3.	"Comets & Stars"
4.	"Where Am I Gonna Run To"
5.	"Through the Window"
6.	"Damned With You"
7.	"Scratch"
8.	"I Shot You Down"
9.	"Japan"
10.	"The Machine"
11.	"Mojo"
12.	"Melancholy Baby"
13.	"The Hypocrite"

=== with Moth Vellum ===
- Moth Vellum (2007)
