= Ramiro Lopez Dau =

Director and animator of feature films and virtual reality

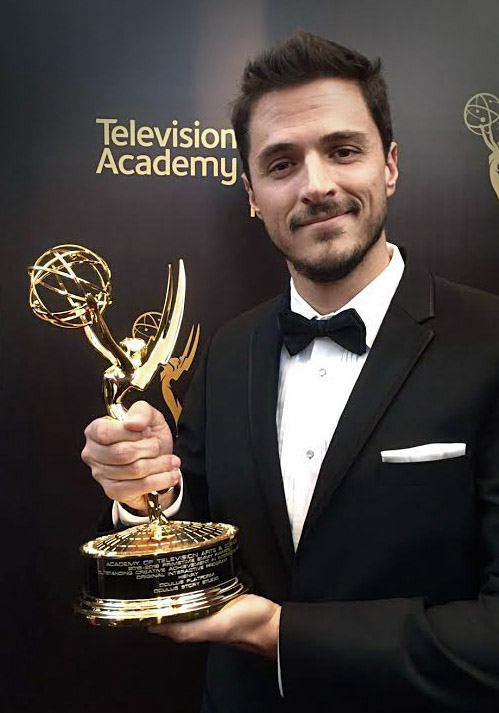
Ramiro Lopez Dau, director of 'Henry', Emmy Award-winner for Original Interactive Program.

Ramiro Lopez Dau is a director and animator of feature films and virtual reality.

Lopez Dau's career began at Ilion Animation Studios in Madrid, Spain, where he started as an animator in early 2003, and quickly became the Supervising Lead Animator in the production of Planet 51. In 2009, he joined Pixar Animation Studios where he worked on such films as La Luna, Cars 2, Brave and Monsters University. During that time, he was also a Pixar press spokesperson for Spanish-speaking countries.

In September 2014, Lopez Dau joined Oculus Story Studio, Facebook's experimental Virtual Reality studio, which had been announced at Sundance Film Festival in January 2015. At Story Studio he wrote and directed Henry, the Studio's second production. He was also the Animation Supervisor on all Story Studio productions: Lost, Henry, Dear Angelica and the adaptation of Neil Gaiman's Wolves in the Walls, which was cancelled after the Studio's unexpected shutdown in May 2017. After Oculus Story Studio, Lopez Dau joined Facebook where he is Creative Director of an experimental VR project.

In 2015, Lopez Dau was named one of the "20 most influential Latinos in tech" by CNET, and in September 2016, Henry was awarded a Primetime Emmy Award for Original Interactive Program, becoming the first Virtual Reality movie to receive this award.
