= Carl Dau =

German designer

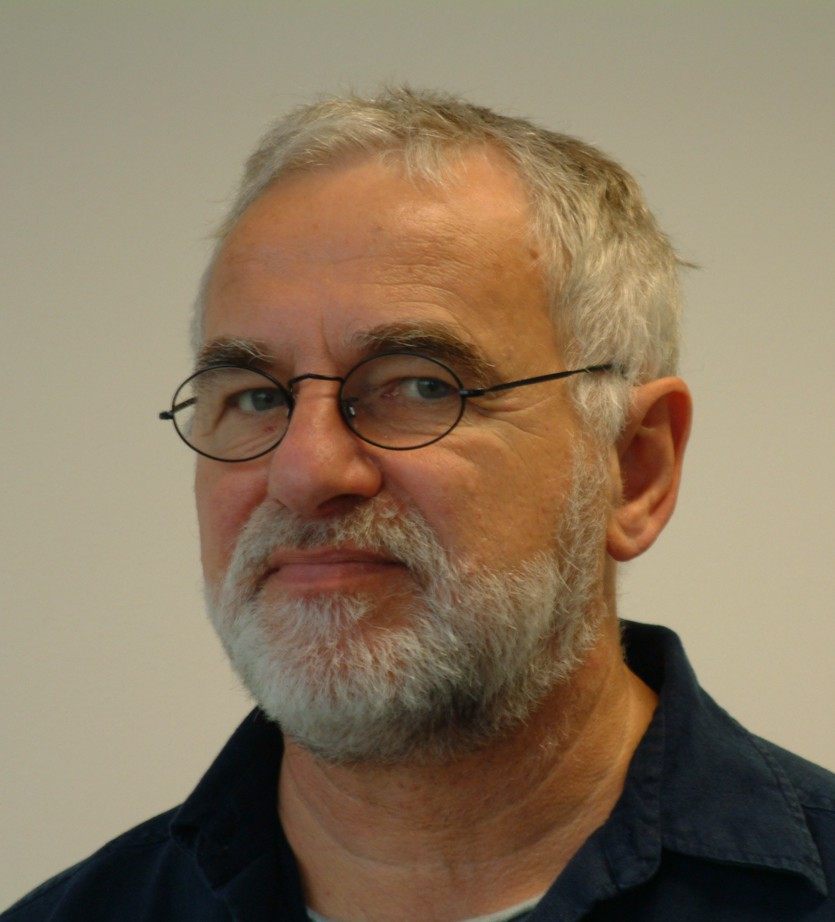
Carl Dau

Carl Dau (born 30 November 1942 in Toruń, Poland), is a German designer.

== Early life ==
Dau was born in Nazi occupied Poland but grew up in Brandenburg. In 1960 he started training as a seaman in Bremen, serving four years in the Merchant Navy.

== Design career ==
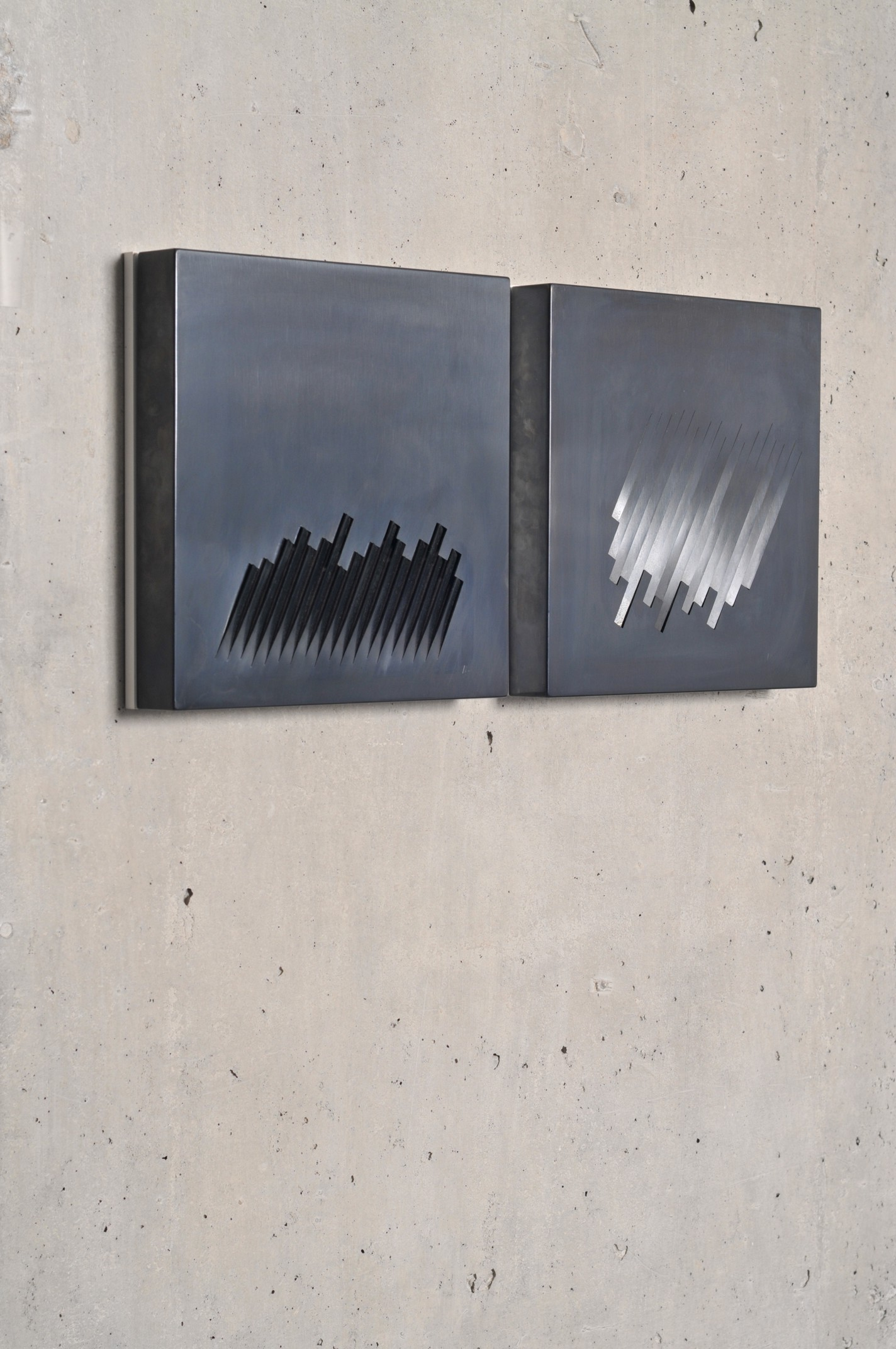
Objekt 1980

At the age of 23 he began training as a goldsmith. In 1972 immediately after earning his master goldsmiths´ degree at the Hanau State Academy and being awarded a gifted students´ educational grant, he went to Berlin to complete further studies at the Berlin College of Fine Arts.

Parallel to these studies he established his first own workshop in Berlin, and became a teacher for vocational training at the School for Goldsmiths. Finally, between 1976 and 1978, he also completed a third course of studies in industrial design at the College of Fine Arts.

Since 1996, Dau has worked with his team in his workshop and atelier in Berlin. In 1980 he gave up his teaching profession in order to set up his own business. In his first years of self-employment he worked alone and concentrated on larger objects. In 1983 he left the creative area of industrial design to concentrate his work purely on jewellery.

Since 2010 Dau has been devoting himself to the creation of wall objects parallel to the design of jewellery.

== Design concepts ==
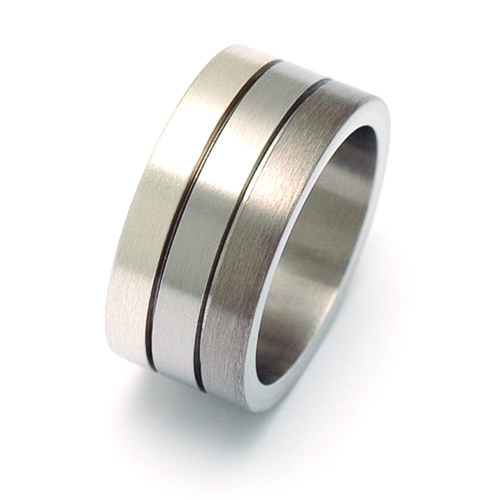
SR-A 10

Dau never really worked at creating a unique piece of jewellery. His ambitions were always aimed at serial jewellery, even though the term serial production has meanwhile been modified and is more precise.

The first series produced at the beginning of the eighties were graphically dominant. The influence of objects of art on these first series was apparent and they often appeared like cultivated, small, wall objects. The preferred shapes were circular, triangular and square, offered in various material combinations and a variety of graphical structures.

== Awards ==
- 1983 Berlin Regional Prize
- 1987 Hessen State Prize
- 1988 Baden-Württemberg Regional State Prize
