= Oculus Story Studio =

Former virtual-reality film studio

- Type: Virtual reality film studio
- Industry: Films and virtual reality
- Founded: 2014
- Founder: Saschka Unseld; Max Planck; Edward Saatchi
- Defunct: May 2017
- Headquarters: Oculus VR, Menlo Park, California, U.S.
- Parent: Oculus VR
- Website: StoryStudio.Oculus.com

Oculus Story Studio was an original animated virtual reality film studio that was a division of Oculus VR. The studio was started by Oculus VR to pioneer animated virtual reality filmmaking and educate, inspire, and foster community for filmmakers interested in VR.

Story Studio was founded in 2014 by Pixar veterans Saschka Unseld and Max Planck, as well as producer Edward Saatchi. The studio was publicly announced and premiered its first film, Lost, at the 2015 Sundance Film Festival. In 2016 the studio's second film, Henry, won the Emmy for Outstanding Original Interactive Program.

Oculus announced in May 2017 that the studio had been closed.

== Filmography ==
The studio produced three films before being shut down.

=== Lost ===
Lost was the first film released by Oculus Story Studio. Directed by studio Creative Director Saschka Unseld. The film drops viewers in the middle of the woods at night to witness a robot searching for its misplaced hand.

=== Henry ===
Henry is the second film released by Oculus Story Studio, directed by Ramiro Lopes Dau and narrated by Elijah Wood. Henry is the story of a hedgehog who has trouble making friends. Henry premiered at an event in Hollywood on July 28, 2015.

Henry became the first original VR short to win the Emmy for Outstanding Original Interactive Program.

=== Dear Angelica ===
The third project from Oculus Story Studio, Dear Angelica, premiered at the 2017 Sundance Film Festival. The film was directed by Saschka Unseld, produced by Edward Saatchi, illustrated by Wesley Allsbrook, and featured music by Drazen Bosnjak and Sarah Jaffe. It stars Geena Davis and Mae Whitman in a "visually splendid and deeply human journey through memory, loss, and the magic of a valorous life." The film was animated entirely with the Oculus Quill, a VR drawing and sculpting application.
