= Aye Write =

- Status: Active
- Genre: Book festival
- Frequency: Annually
- Location: Glasgow
- Country: Scotland
- Years active: 21
- Inaugurated: 19 February 2005
- Website: www.ayewrite.com

Aye Write, originally stylized as Aye Write!, is an annual book festival which takes place in Glasgow, Scotland in late February or early March.

== History ==
The first Aye Write festival was in 2005. Originally intended to occur once every two years, Aye Write announced in 2007 that the book festival would become an annual event. In response to the COVID-19 pandemic, the festival was cancelled in 2020, and was online-only in 2021. Aye Write returned to in-person festivities in 2022. The 2024 festival was announced as being cancelled after a failure to secure funding from Creative Scotland, however a large donation then allowed organisers to run a slimmed programme, with pop-up events now planned to take place across 2024.

== Participants ==
The 2016 line-up included Chris Brookmyre, Limmy, and Stuart Cosgrove.

People who have taken part in the festival include: Edwin Morgan, William McIlvanney, Ian McEwan, Iain Banks, Denise Mina, Louise Welsh, Jackie Kay, Andrew Motion, Lynne Truss, Jenny Colgan, John Burnside, and others.

== Clare Maclean Prize ==
The Clare Maclean Prize for Scottish Fiction was awarded at the 2008 festival in memory of Claire Maclean, the partner of Mike Gonzalez, with a £3000 first prize. It was open to any book written by a Scottish author (or someone working in Scotland) in the previous twelve months.

Year	Author	Title	Result
2008	Dan Rhodes	Gold	Won
2008	Iain Banks	The Steep Approach to Garbadale	Shortlisted
2008	John Burnside	The Devil's Footprints	Shortlisted
2008	Alasdair Gray	Old Men in Love	Shortlisted
2008	A. L. Kennedy	Day	Shortlisted
2008	Ali Smith	Girl Meets Boy	Shortlisted
