= When the Professor Got Stuck in the Snow =

Book by Dan Rhodes

- First edition
- Author: Dan Rhodes
- Language: English
- Publisher: Miyuki Books (Note: Miyuki was the central character in Rhodes 1998 novel Gold.) (self-published)
- Publication date: 26 Feb 2014
- Publication place: United Kingdom
- Pages: 290
- ISBN: 0-992827-60-4

When the Professor Got Stuck in the Snow is a novel by British author Dan Rhodes, a "rural farce" about a visit to an obscure English village by a fictional Richard Dawkins.

== Publication ==
Rhodes initially self-published the novel in a run of 400 in February 2014, stating on his blog that he wanted to get the book out faster than conventional publishing allows, although it soon became apparent that formal publishers were loath to publish the novel for fear of legal action from Dawkins. Rhodes appealed repeatedly to Dawkins, a defender of satire and free speech, for permission to "publish and be damned" but received no response. The novel was eventually published by Aardvark Bureau in October 2015.

== Plot introduction ==
Professor Richard Dawkins has been booked to give a talk at the village hall in the village of Upper Bottom to the All Bottoms Women's Institute on the subject of "Science and the non-existence of God". But his train becomes stuck in a snow-drift several miles short of their destination and he and his devoted though long-suffering assistant Smee are forced to spend the night in the home of the local Anglican vicar.

== Reception ==
Helen Pidd writing in The Guardian praised the novel: "It is a zippy little farce, littered with bus-stop slang (the professor erroneously believes "bell end" to be a compliment) and amusing nods to popular culture. Alan Rusbridger, editor-in-chief of the Guardian, gets a brief mention, but is upstaged by a brilliantly surreal cameo from CBeebies favourite Mr Tumble.", she concludes, "The Dawkins character is a hoot: foul-mouthed, pompous, so certain of his beliefs that he will dissect a puppy in front of primary schoolchildren if it will disabuse them of the creation "myth" invented by the "dark forces of religion". If this enjoyable comedy has a message it is that you shouldn't believe all you read on the internet. And that in an age where the sum of man's knowledge is available in an instant via a fibre-optic line, we are perhaps more ignorant than ever we were, and just as likely to be duped as in Shakespeare's day."

Lettie Kennedy, also in The Guardian was positive: "Between delivering kittens and turning on the Christmas lights, the stranded professor gamely persists in trying to convert his captive audience to humanism, launching into Swiftian discourses on infanticide and cannibalism at every opportunity, to the growing disquiet of Smee. Rhodes’s novel is gleefully irreverent, with a ribald wit and a truculent disregard for the legal niceties that caused it to remain unpublished for several years. There are, of course, a number of twists, all of which are delivered with very English eccentricity."

Herald Scotland comments 'Rhodes's portrait of the fictional Dawkins is on the far side of caricature, so rich in ridicule it makes a lampoon look limp. "My life would be so much easier if everybody was as clever as me," the professor sighs, meanwhile planning his series of children's books. The first will be called Your Parents Are Idiots, "aimed at children unfortunate enough to have been born into religious households"...'At times Rhodes bangs his drum too often and too loud, but he is such a vivid and elegant writer that is quickly forgiven, though perhaps not if your name is Richard Dawkins. Yet behind the mockery lie some deeper reflections: about how people should treat each other, the meaning of respect, and the ingrained need that everyone feels to make sense of our existence.'

Tim Martin in The Spectator believes the novel will become a classic, "Rhodes’s book is satire of the broadest stripe: it is, in fact, the closest thing to a strip from Viz magazine that I’ve seen in novel form. The tone swerves hilariously between puerile double-entendre (there’s a running sequence of gags about ‘seeing Upper Bottom’) and lacerating comedy about the atheist movement and its acolytes".
