= Marry Me =

Marry Me may refer to:

== Film and television ==
- Marry Me (1925 film), an American comedy silent film
- Marry Me (1932 film), a British film
- Marry Me! (1949 film), a British film
- Marry Me (2022 film), an American romantic comedy film
- Marry Me (miniseries), a television miniseries starring Lucy Liu
- Marry Me (American TV series), an American television series

== Music ==
- Marry Me (St. Vincent album), 2007
- Marry Me (Olly Murs album), 2022
- Marry Me (soundtrack), for the 2022 film
- "Marry Me" (Train song), 2010
- "Marry Me" (Jason Derulo song), 2013
- "Marry Me" (Krista Siegfrids song), 2013
- "Marry Me" (Thomas Rhett song), 2017
- "Marry Me", a song by Neil Diamond with Buffy Lawson from Tennessee Moon, 1996
- "Marry Me", a song by No Doubt from Return of Saturn, 2000
- "Marry Me", a song by Drive-By Truckers from Decoration Day
- "Marry Me", a song by Yemi Alade from Mama Africa
- "Marry Me", by Betty Who from Betty

== Other uses ==
- Marry Me (novel), a novel by John Updike
- Marry Me (short story collection), a short story collection by Dan Rhodes
- Marry Me (webcomic), a webcomic by Bobby Crosby

== See also ==
- "Come Marry Me", a song by Miss Platnum (feat. Peter Fox) from Chefa
- Marry Me a Little (disambiguation)
- Marry You (disambiguation)
- Marriage proposal, an event where one person asks for the other's hand in marriage
- Will You Marry Me? (disambiguation)
