= This Life =

This Life can refer to:

== Film and television ==
- This Life (1996 TV series), a British television drama
- This Life (2015 TV series), a Canadian television drama based on the French-language Canadian series Nouvelle adresse
- This Life (film), a 2012 Danish film

== Music ==
- This Life (The Original Rudeboys album), 2012
- This Life (Take That album), 2023
- "This Life" (Sons of Anarchy song), the theme song of the TV series Sons of Anarchy, 2008
- "This Life" (Vampire Weekend song), 2019
- "This Life", by the Afters from Life Is Beautiful
- "This Life", by Bruce Springsteen from Working on a Dream
- "This Life", by Denzel Curry from Imperial
- "This Life", by Martha Wainwright from Martha Wainwright, 2005
- "This Life", by MercyMe from The Generous Mr. Lovewell
- "This Life", by Tim Hecker from Konoyo

== Other ==
- This Life: Secular Faith and Spiritual Freedom, a 2019 book by Martin Hägglund

== See also ==
- This Is Life, a 2012 novel by Dan Rhodes
- This Is Life (film), a 1953 Danish film
- This Is Life with Lisa Ling, a TV series
