= Timoleon Vieta Come Home =

2003 novel by Dan Rhodes

Timoleon Vieta Come Home: A Sentimental Journey
- First edition
- Author: Dan Rhodes
- Illustrator: Vien Thuc
- Language: English
- Genre: Parody
- Publisher: Canongate Books
- Publication date: 2003
- Publication place: United Kingdom
- Media type: Print & eBook
- Pages: 224
- ISBN: 1-84195-422-5
- OCLC: 53962137

Timoleon Vieta Come Home: A Sentimental Journey (2003) is a novel by British author Dan Rhodes, a parody of the classic Lassie Come Home film. It was Rhodes' first novel, and won the 2003 Author's Club First Novel Award. It has been translated into at least 20 languages.

== Plot introduction ==
The novel centres around Timoleon Vieta, a little mongrel dog with black and white patches of fur and eyes that are described as being as pretty as a girl's. Timoleon lives with Cockcroft, a retired, gay composer, who lives in a run-down farmhouse in Umbria financed by the occasional royalties he receives from the theme tunes he wrote. He reminisces about his failed career and former lovers, but is surprised when a man claiming to be a Bosnian shows up at his door with a business card he says Cockcroft gave him in a bar in Florence; Cockcroft often has such drunken weekends when he attempts to pick up men.

In return for the occasional odd job and weekly fellatio, Cockcroft provides him with accommodation, but Timoleon Vieta, who is a good judge of character, takes against the Bosnian, and the dislike is reciprocated. Cockcroft is forced to choose between them and agrees to abandon the dog in Rome. The remainder of the novel is about Timoleon Vieta's journey back home, and the people he briefly comes into contact with, as he tries to make his way back to his beloved Cockcroft.

== Names ==
"Timoleon - Vieta" and "Carthusians - Cockcroft" were printed on the spines of volumes 22 and 5 respectively of the 14th edition of the Encyclopædia Britannica. Cockcroft's piano is also a "Spelman - Timmins" (volume 21).
