= Mitchell Library =

Public library in Glasgow, Scotland

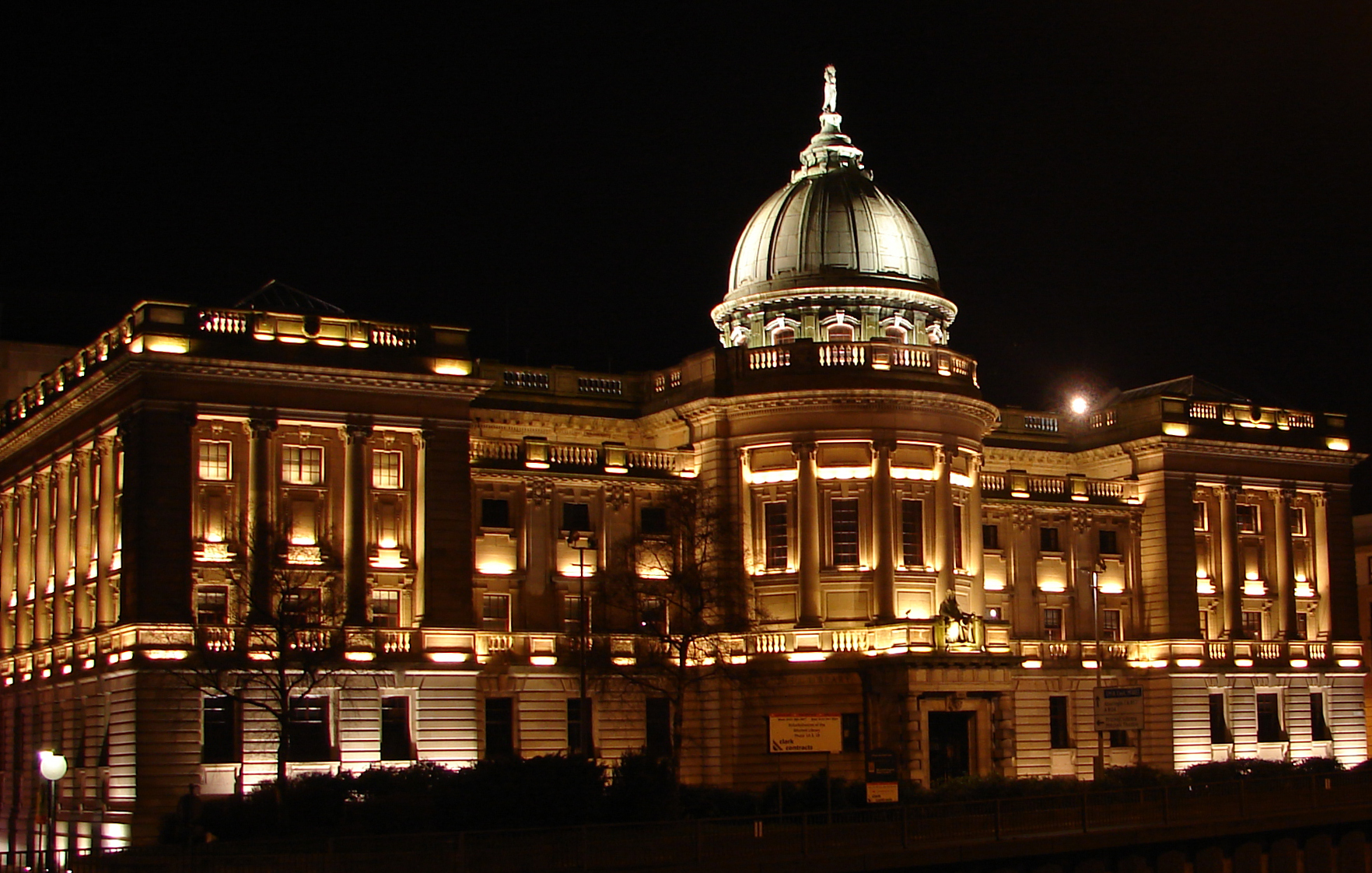
- 55°51′54.39″N 4°16′19.23″W
- Location: North Street, Glasgow, G3 7DN, Scotland
- Type: Public library (Reference and lending)
- Established: 1877 (Opened 1911) (Extended 1977–80)
- Branch of: Glasgow Libraries

Collection
- Items collected: Books, newspapers, journals maps, multimedia, archives, microforms
- Size: Over 1,213,000 volumes

Access and use
- Access requirements: Open to the general public, Monday to Saturday. Lending library requires a Glasgow Libraries borrowers' card.
- Population served: 577,670

Other information
- Website: The Mitchell Library

The Mitchell Library is a large public library located in the Charing Cross area of Glasgow, Scotland. It is the largest public reference library in Europe, and the centre of Glasgow's public library system.

== History ==
The library was initially established in Ingram Street in 1877 following a bequest from Stephen Mitchell, a wealthy tobacco producer, whose company, Stephen Mitchell & Son, would become one of the constituent members of the Imperial Tobacco Company.

Part of the original collection came from a purchase in 1874 by Glasgow Corporation of 1800 early books gifted to the University of Glasgow from the Glasgow philanthropist William Euing.

New buildings were erected in North Street. A foundation stone was laid by Andrew Carnegie in September 1907. The completed building was opened by Lord Rosebery on 16 October 1911.

The library contains a large public library, with over a million items. While composed mainly of reference material it also has a substantial lending facility which began in 2005. The North Street building, with its distinctive copper dome surmounted by Thomas Clapperton's bronze statue entitled Literature (often referred to as Minerva, the Roman goddess of wisdom) opened in 1911. The architectural competition for the library was held in 1906 and was won by William B. Whitie. The Edwardian Baroque building is protected as a category B listed building.

The vast majority of the library's collection is housed in the Extension Building, which was built between 1972 and 1980. Located to the west of the original building it occupies the site of the St Andrew's Halls, which were designed by James Sellars, and opened in 1877. Acquired by Glasgow Corporation in 1890 it was Scotland's pre-eminent venue for concerts and meetings. It had a large and striking classical facade and included a Grand Hall which could hold 4,500 people, two Lesser Halls, further small halls and a large ballroom. The building was gutted by fire on 26 October 1962, although the facade survived and was later incorporated into the 1980 extension of the Mitchell Library, with the principal entrance now being in Granville Street.

== People ==
- Stephen Mitchell (manufacturer and philanthropist) (1789–1874), Scottish tobacco manufacturer and philanthropist, and founder of the Mitchell Library.
- Francis Thornton Barrett (1838–1919), first librarian of The Mitchell Library between 1877 & 1899, and city librarian for Glasgow between 1901 & 1914.
- Septimus Pitt (1877–1937), city librarian for Glasgow between 1915 and 1937.

== Services ==
As part of a major internal refurbishment in 2005, the ground floor of the extension was recreated as an internal street running east to west. A new café bar was incorporated with a large learning centre providing free internet and Wi-Fi services. A new business lounge and a lending library have also been created.

Containing five floors, access is freely open to the public, whether library borrowing members or non-members. Non-members can, upon request, use PCs and the internet as well as printed reference materials.

The Mitchell Library also holds the Glasgow City Archives and Special Collections which are considered to be one of the world's best resources for researching family history and have featured in the television series Who Do You Think You Are?.

== Mitchell Theatre ==
The 1980 extension building incorporates the 418-seat Mitchell Theatre. The venue hosts a variety of theatre, music and spoken word events, including some during Glasgow's Celtic Connections and Aye Write! festivals.

== Gallery ==
Mitchell Library

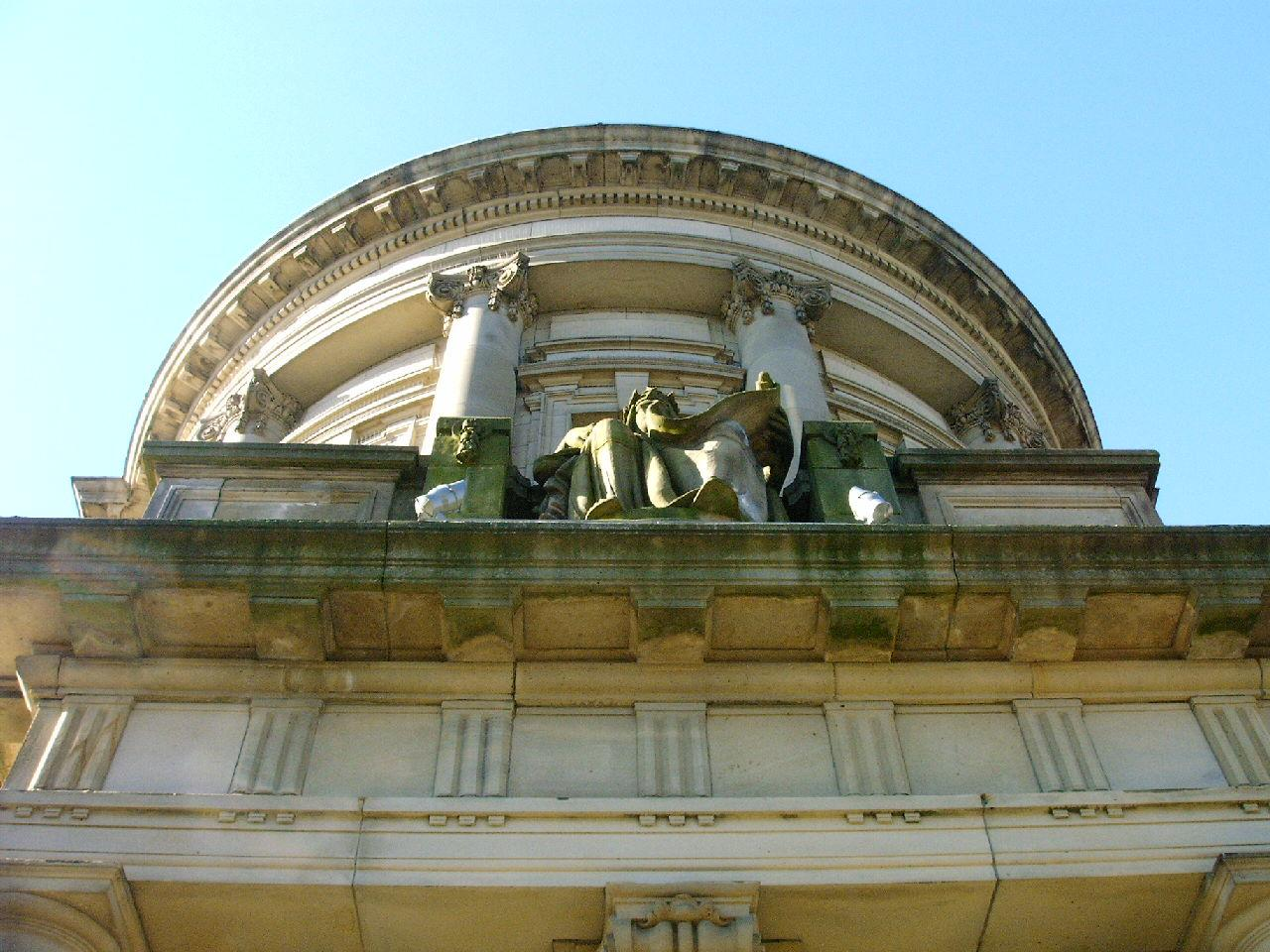
Looking straight up from the front door

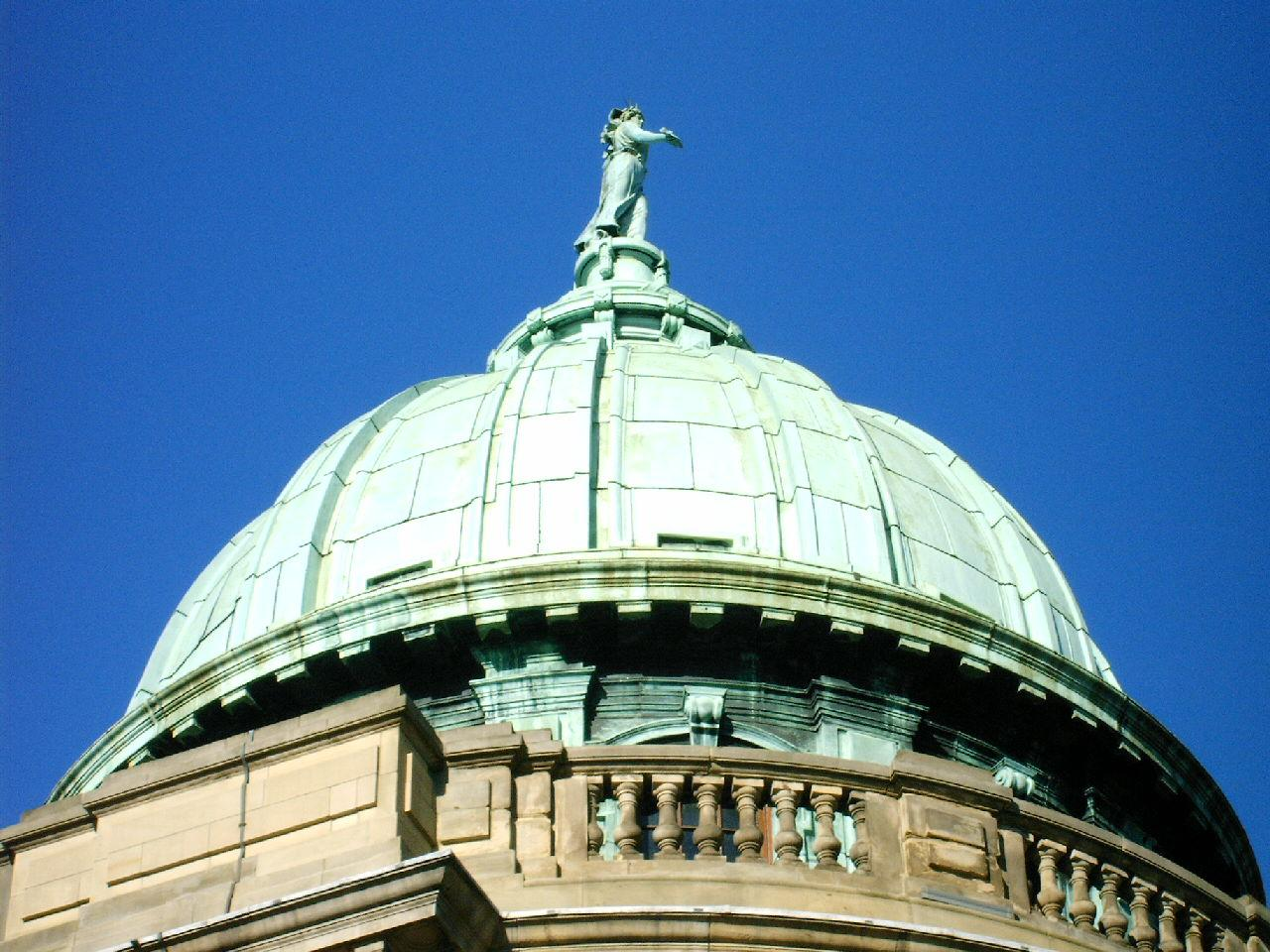
The ornate bronze dome roof

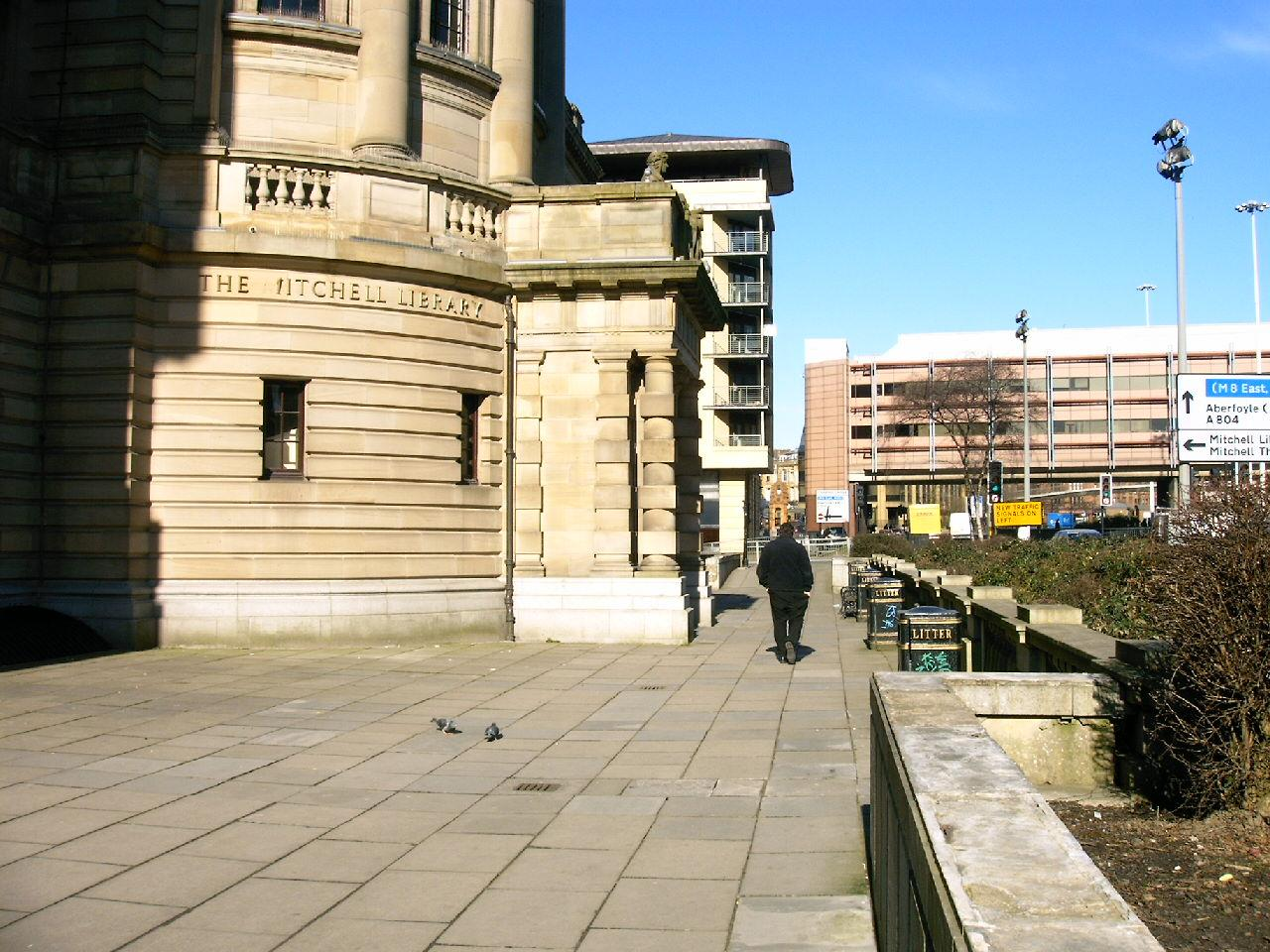
Outside the Mitchell library

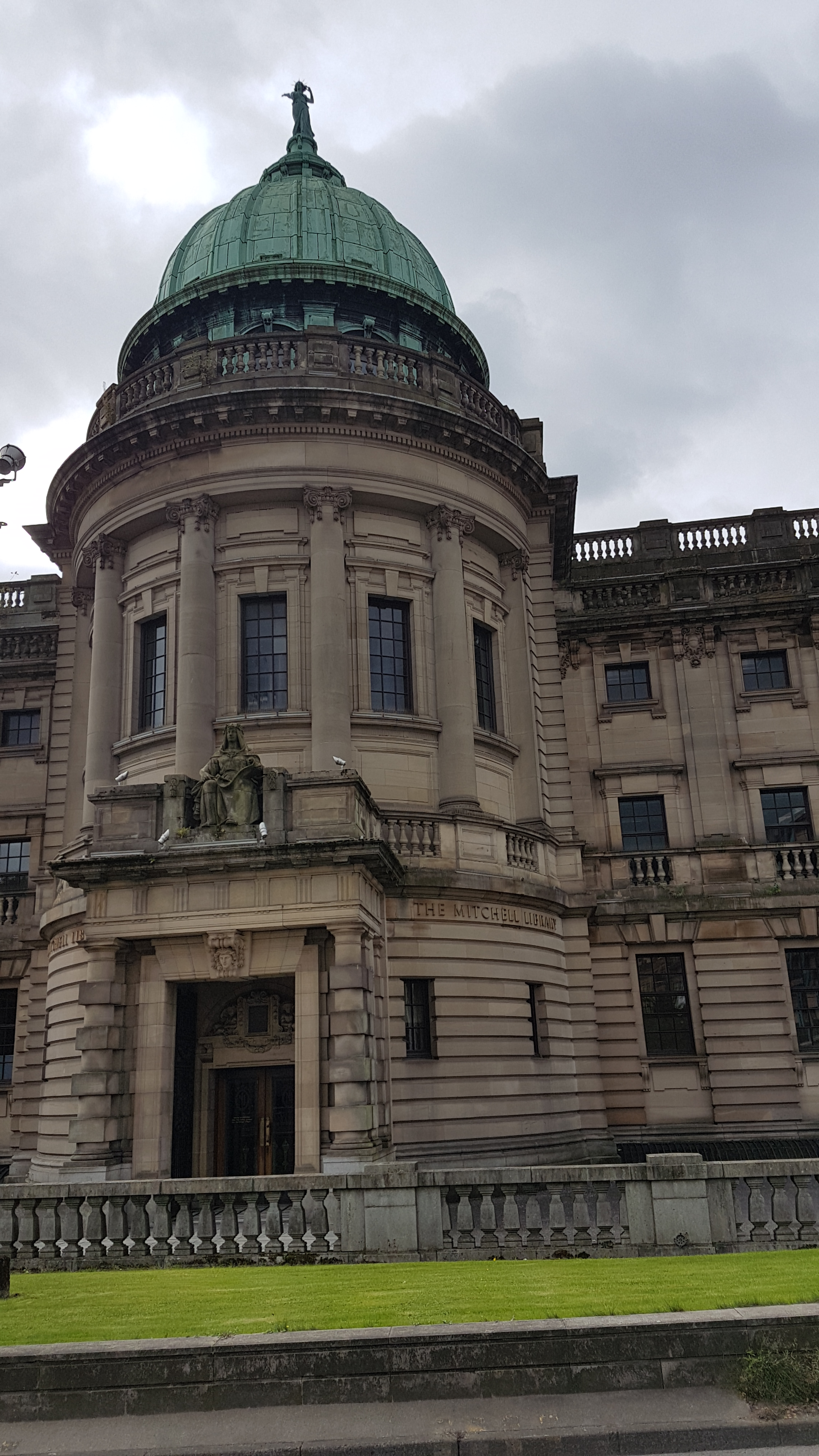
North Street view of the Mitchell
