= The Truth About Love (disambiguation) =

The Truth About Love is a 2012 album by Pink. It also may refer to:

- The Truth About Love (film), 2004
- The Truth About Love (Lemar album), 2006
- The Truth About Love Tour, the sixth concert tour by Pink
  - The Truth About Love Tour: Live from Melbourne, the accompanying video album

== See also ==
- Don't Tell Me the Truth About Love, short story collection by British author Dan Rhodes
- "O Tell Me the Truth About Love", a poem by W. H. Auden; set to music by Benjamin Britten as one of his Cabaret Songs
