= Little Hands Clapping =

2010 novel by Dan Rhodes

- First edition cover (with quote from Douglas Coupland)
- Author: Dan Rhodes
- Cover artist: David Roberts
- Language: English
- Publisher: Canongate Books
- Publication date: 4 February 2010
- Publication place: United Kingdom
- Media type: Print & eBook
- Pages: 320
- ISBN: 1-84767-529-8

Little Hands Clapping, is a novel by British author Dan Rhodes, published in 2010 by Canongate. Its title comes from a line in Robert Browning's poem The Pied Piper of Hamelin.

== Plot introduction ==
The novel centres around a bizarre German museum dedicated to suicide; Herr Schmidt, its grim grey curator; and the respectable Doctor Ernst Frölicher and his shocking secret.

Various characters appear with short lifestories including the Luciano Pavarotti-obsessed founder of the museum and her Pavarotti-lookalike husband, Hulda the cleaner who believes she is doomed to Hell, and Madalena the suicidal Portuguese student.

== Reception ==
- "Totally sick and brilliant, He sucks you into his world. I loved it." Douglas Coupland
- "Almost every page of Little Hands Clapping has superb quirks or asides which will have the reader laughing. A sublime, brilliant novel", The Scotsman
- "It should please cynical idealists and idealistic cynics alike." Financial Times
