= Septimus Pitt =

Septimus Albert Pitt
- Born: November 19, 1877; Durham, England
- Died: 27 August 1937 (aged 59); Coldingham
- Employer: The Corporation of the City of Glasgow
- Title: City Librarian
- Predecessor: Francis Thornton Barrett
- Successor: Robert Bain
- Spouse: Cecilia Philip (or Phillips) Keir (1876-1952)
- Children: 1

Septimus Albert Pitt (November 19, 1877 – August 27, 1937) was the second City Librarian (from 1915-1937) of Glasgow, Lanarkshire, where he greatly extended the library services.

== Early life ==
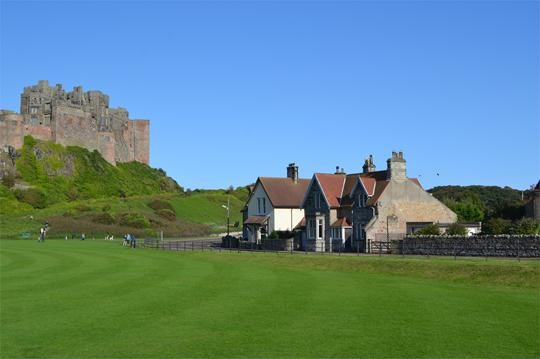
Rock Cottage, Bamburgh - long view

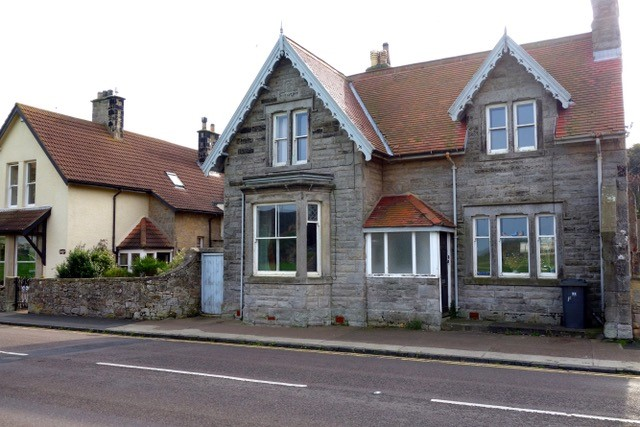
Rock Cottage, Bamburgh - front of house

Septimus Albert Pitt was born on 19 November 1877 in Low Fell, Durham, England, the seventh-born son of Henry Pitt (24 March 1839 – 20 September 1906), a glass works manager, and Susan Harley (30 July 1839 – 7 May 1918). His maternal grandfather, Robert Henry Harley (1803-1875), was a bookseller and stationer. While his parents originated from Birmingham, they raised their large family (of eight sons and three daughters) in the counties of Durham (in the 1881 census, the family lived at 12 Victoria Terrace, Gateshead) and Northumberland (in the 1891 census, the family lived at Rock Cottage, Bamburgh).

== Personal life ==
Pitt married Cecilia Philip (or Phillips) Keir (1876–1952) at Robinson’s Temperance Hotel and Restaurant, 31 Lothian Road, in the parish of St. George, Edinburgh, Midlothian, on 30 August 1899. The Pitts’ only child, daughter Cecilia Jessie Pitt (1900–1971), was born on 17 October 1900 at 18 Devonshire Road, Aberdeen, Aberdeenshire.

== Public life ==
At the age of 14, Pitt began work as a junior assistant in the South Shields Public Library, County Durham. He began his professional career early, being appointed Sub-Librarian in 1894, just before the age of seventeen, and having charge of the complete reorganisation of the library.

In 1898, he went to Aberdeen and, after a spell of several years as Sub-Librarian in the city, he came to Glasgow in 1901 to open Gorbals Library, the city’s first public lending library. In 1903, he was appointed Superintendent of Glasgow’s District Libraries, supervising the scheme for establishing sixteen district libraries and two reading-rooms in the city.

For several years, Pitt and his family lived at 11 Bolton Drive, Mount Florida. However, by 1908, Pitt had left Scotland to become City Librarian in Coventry, Warwickshire, where he remained for several years.

Following his appointment in December 1914, Pitt took up his duties as City Librarian for Glasgow on 15 March 1915, serving in this capacity for 22 years, based at The Mitchell Library, Glasgow. (His predecessor, Francis Thornton Barrett, had officially retired in 1914 but continued to work for the Library in an advisory capacity until shortly before his death in 1919 at the age of eighty.) On his return to Glasgow, Pitt greatly extended the library services, organising the first municipal commercial library in the country in 1915. In the years immediately following the Great War, his attention was occupied largely with the expansion of the lending service and, during the nineteen-twenties, the opening of a number of new branch libraries.

Pitt published papers throughout his professional life, and contributed regularly to professional journals, and at Library Association meetings and conferences, his particular interests being the study of bibliography, library history, and languages. In 1919, Pitt spoke of his support for the idea of ‘open-access’ libraries (first introduced to Britain by James Duff Brown at Clerkenwell Public Library in London), speaking against the ‘indicator system’, which was an adjunct of ‘closed-access’ libraries, in which access to books is not readily accessible for reading or browsing but tightly controlled by library staff, saying,

“Familiarity with books is the most important element in the education of the people and unrestricted access to a library power, because a book is power.”

In 1924, Pitt served on the Departmental Committee on Public Libraries, which reported in June 1927.

Pitt served the Library Association as a member of the Council from 1915, Vice-President in 1920, and as President in 1934. He was also, twice (from 1927-1928 and from 1931-1932), a President of the Scottish Library Association.

In 1928, Pitt was one of two commissioners (the other being Milton J. Ferguson, State Librarian of California, USA) who, under the auspices of the Carnegie Corporation of New York, was sent to survey and report on the library services in South Africa and Kenya. A direct culmination of their visit (convening at the end of their three months of investigations) was the 1928 Bloemfontein Conference (from 15–17 November 1928), at which they discussed their findings and suggested proposals towards improved public library services in the country. This conference (the first library conference in South Africa), is regarded as a watershed event in South African library development as it helped instigate the demise of the subscription system in favour of free libraries. In 1929, Pitt and Ferguson produced identically-titled but separate reports of their investigations.

Meanwhile, back in Scotland, in Glasgow's Mitchell Library, Pitt devised its first open access department, the Music Room, which opened in 1930. By 1935, Pitt was obliged to obtain further accommodation for the book stock of The Mitchell Library and to suggest that the Library be further extended. The sub-committee appointed to consider his report found that the Library, originally designed to accommodate 330,000 volumes, now held approximately 400,000, and that the number was increasing at a rate of 6-10,000 per annum, large numbers of books being stored in corridors as there was no room for additional shelving in which to accommodate them. The area suggested for an extension by Pitt was deemed suitable, and the project was approved. However, having initiated the project, Pitt did not, however, see its commencement in March 1939; he died, suddenly, on 27 August 1937 and was succeeded as City Librarian by Robert Bain.

== Later life ==
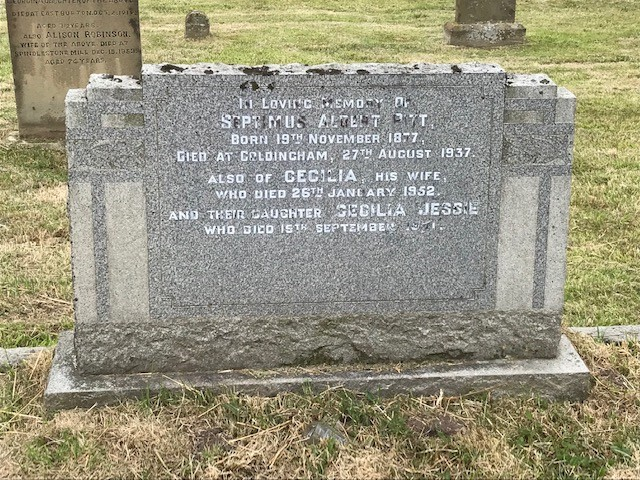
Grave of Septimus Pitt in St. Aidan's Parish Church, Bamburgh

By 1920, Pitt had moved to “Stourleigh”, 8 Montrose Gardens in Milngavie, Dunbartonshire, where he resided until his death on 27 August 1937 at "Holmleigh", Coldingham, Berwickshire, at the age of fifty-nine. Septimus Albert Pitt was laid to rest in the graveyard of Parish Church of Saint Aidan, in Bamburgh, Northumberland.

== Posthumous reputation ==
Pitt is recognised as having organised the first municipal commercial library in the country, which opened in Glasgow 1915, and he was an ardent advocate for their development elsewhere.

J. M. Mitchell, Secretary of the Carnegie United Kingdom Trust Fund, described Pitt as follows:

“At all times he kept his singularly agile, though cautious, mind alert to assess the value and the possibility of new ideas."

== Bibliography ==
- Application and testimonials of Septimus Albert Pitt, Superintendent of Branch Libraries, Glasgow, candidate for the office of Librarian, Dundee Free Libraries. Septimus Albert Pitt; [Glasgow]: [MacLehose], [1907].
- Application and testimonials of Septimus Albert Pitt, Superintendent of Branch Libraries, Glasgow, candidate for the office of Chief Librarian, Coventry Free Public Library. Septimus Albert Pitt; [Glasgow]: [MacLehose], [1908].
- Application and testimonials of Septimus Albert Pitt, Chief Librarian, Coventry, late Superintendent of Branch Libraries, Glasgow, candidate for the office of Chief Librarian, Free Public Libraries, Liverpool. Septimus Albert Pitt; [Glasgow]: [MacLehose], [1909].
- Application and testimonials of Septimus A. Pitt ...: candidate for the position of City Librarian, Glasgow. Septimus Albert Pitt; [Glasgow]: [MacLehose], [1914].
- The library rate in relation to the financial position of public libraries: with notes of the discussion. S. A. Pitt; Scottish Library Association. Aberdeen: The University Press, 1919.
- Libraries of the United States and Canada; report of visit by the City Librarian, Glasgow, September–October, 1926. Septimus Albert Pitt [Place of publication not identified], [publisher not identified] [1926].
- Memorandum. Libraries in the Union of South Africa, Rhodesia and Kenya colony. Septimus Albert Pitt. New York, 1929.
- Presidential Address. The Library Association: retrospect and prospect. London Conference, September 1934. Library Association Record, 4th series, I, 1934, pp. 297–301.
- Die Carnegie-biblioteeksending van 1928. Petrus Carolus Coetzee; Septimus Albert Pitt; Milton James Ferguson Pretoria: The State Library, 1975.
