= Marry Me (short story collection) =

2013 short story collection by Dan Rhodes

- First edition
- Author: Dan Rhodes
- Cover artist: Joel Holland
- Language: English
- Genre: Short stories
- Publisher: Canongate Books (US)
- Publication date: 31 Jan 2013
- Publication place: United Kingdom
- Media type: Print & ebook
- Pages: 176
- ISBN: 0-85786-849-7

Marry Me is a short story collection by British author Dan Rhodes. It was published in 2013 by Canongate Books. It is a sequel to his earlier collection Anthropology: And a Hundred Other Stories, moving the girlfriend relationships of the earlier book into the realm of marriage. It carries the strapline "Essential reading for anyone who is, has ever been, or might one day be married."

== Reception ==
Reviews were positive:

- Stuart Evers in The Telegraph praises the collection, concluding "In Rhodes’s hands marriage is something between a fairy story and a night terror – a place where one can find oneself, or lose oneself. The single tone of the stories and the repetitions ends up working beautifully: just when you think you know where a story is going, Rhodes changes tack, adding something macabre to the romantic or something surreal to the melancholic...Few writers can match Rhodes gag for gag; fewer still can match his effortless creation of a fully realised fictional universe. And while it perhaps lacks the control and precision of Anthropology, Marry Me is a welcome return to the form."
- Kate Kellaway in The Observer is similarly impressed: "Going too far is Dan Rhodes's forte. The reader is constantly and pleasurably aware that he is not a safe pair of hands. This entertaining book should not be bought by any innocent purchaser as a hint of a marriage proposal to come (although Rhodes, who seems to like writing dangerously, would almost certainly disagree). The size of a prayer book, the contents are rum, original and seriously flippant. Shorter than the average short story and occasionally no longer than a couple of paragraphs or two or three sentences, these fictional conceits are about marriage, weddings, infidelity, fatal attraction – and the lack of it. Rhodes's wilfully flat tone makes the way his stories dive into disaster and ricochet through romance much funnier. He has a comedian's talent for the deadpan."
- Doug Johnstone in The Independent finishes with "Taken individually, the stories invariably raise a chuckle, usually accompanied by a wince and an involuntary acknowledgement of the truth behind the sloppy stuff of romance. But more impressively, when taken as a whole, Marry Me amounts to a bleak yet funny world view, as if P G Wodehouse and Graham Greene had got together to form a greetings card company.
