= Stephen Mitchell & Son =

Scottish tobacco manufacturing company

- Type: Private
- Industry: Tobacco
- Founded: 1723 in Linlithgow
- Founder: Stephen Mitchell
- Defunct: 1901; 125 years ago
- Fate: Merged to form Imperial Tobacco in 1901
- Successor: Imperial Tobacco
- Headquarters: Scotland
- Area served: United Kingdom
- Products: Cigarettes

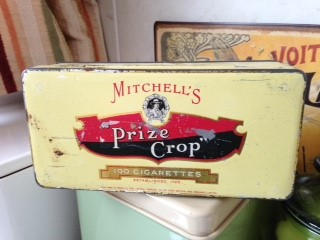

Stephen Mitchell & Son was a Scottish tobacco manufacturing company, established in Linlithgow in 1723. Stephen Mitchell, its founder, is regarded as one of the earliest and the most significant player in Scottish tobacco production.

His grandson, also named Stephen Mitchell (1789–1874), was born in Linlithgow on 19 September 1789. On the death of his own father (the founder's grandson) in 1820 Stephen continued the family business, transferring it to Glasgow, relocating first to Candleriggs in 1825 and subsequently, to St Andrew's Square, Glasgow in 1832.

Mitchell retired to Moffat in 1859 and died there on 21 April 1874 following a fall. He never married, and left a public bequest of £66,998 10s 6d to ensure the establishment and maintenance of a public library in Glasgow, to be known as the Mitchell Library. The library was formally opened on 1 November 1877 by the Hon. James Bain, Lord Provost, and on Monday 5 November its doors were opened to the public. By 1977, it laid claim to being the largest public reference library in Europe.

In 1901, at the creation of the Imperial Tobacco Company, Mitchells' became one of its constituent thirteen branches which had previously been independent companies.
