= Stephen Mitchell (philanthropist) =

Scottish founder of Mitchell Library

- Born: 19 September 1789; Ecclesmachan, Linlithgowshire, Scotland
- Died: 21 April 1874 (aged 84); Moffat, Dumfriesshire, Scotland
- Occupation: Tobacco manufacturer
- Known for: Philanthropy
- Predecessor: Stephen Mitchell (1768-1821)
- Successor: Nelson (also known as Neilson) Mitchell (1801-1889)

Stephen Mitchell (19 September 1789 – 21 April 1874) was a Scottish tobacco manufacturer and philanthropist. He was the founder of the Mitchell Library, in Glasgow, Lanarkshire, Scotland, one of the earliest public reference libraries in Europe. Succeeding his father in business, Mitchell was Director of Stephen Mitchell & Son for approximately 38 years, and was a significant figure in 19th-century tobacco manufacturing, then one of the largest industries in the West of Scotland.

== Early life ==
Stephen Mitchell was born on 19 September 1789 in Ecclesmachan, Linlithgowshire (now West Lothian), into a long-established family of tobacco and snuff merchants and burghers. Records of the family of Stephen Mitchell go back to the early 16th century; the Mitchells were tenants of Waulkmilton, Muiravonside, Linlithgowshire from 1568 to about 1723. Mitchell was baptised at Linlithgow on 13 March 1790, the eldest of the ten children of Stephen Mitchell (1768–1821) of Ecclesmachan, and Agnes Neilson (1767–1840) of Glasgow.

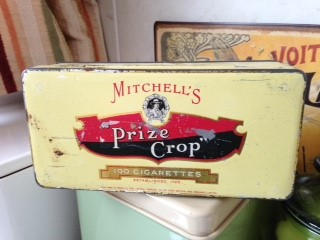
Mitchell's 'Prize Crop' cigarette tin

== Education ==
Mitchell attended Linlithgow Grammar School(built in the 1620s and later destroyed by fire), which stood to the south of St. Michael’s Parish Church in the Kirkgate area of the town. He was regarded as being a good student, who passed through a better than ordinary course of general culture for the time, including Classics and French. In 1805, he began a four-year apprenticeship with Messrs. James Anderson & Company, merchants, of Leith and London.

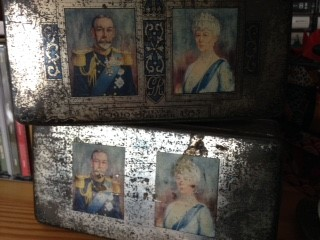
Mitchell's 'Prize Crop' cigarette tins

In 1809, Stephen Mitchell entered the family tobacco-manufacturing business, Stephen Mitchell & Son, which was set up in 1723 by his great-grandfather, also named Stephen Mitchell. This family business originally comprised a shop in town at 150 High Street, Linlithgow, in the Vennel area, on the corner leading to the Loch (at one time the site of Linlithgow Library) - and a snuff-mill in the countryside at Waulkmilton. The business benefitted from its convenient situation between the tobacco supplies of Glasgow and the market facilities of Edinburgh and grew until the period of the American Revolution and its resulting negative impact on European tobacco prices. This economic downturn had convinced Stephen Mitchell’s father to leave Scotland and seek employment in the tobacco trade of the United States of America; setting off in August 1784 and eventually returning around the summer of 1787, he observed and worked for operators establishing industrialised tobacco manufacture in the Petersburg and Richmond areas of Virginia.

== Personal life ==
Stephen Mitchell had no children and never married, and family history records suggest that the reason he remained a bachelor was because of a disappointment in love: both he and his brother Nelson (also known as Neilson) Mitchell (1801-1889) had courted the same woman (thought to be Isabella Cameron - also known as Mary or May), but she finally decided to marry Nelson/Neilson in 1834.

== Public life ==
On 8 June 1814, Stephen was admitted to the Fraternity of Dyers, the only surviving Trade Guild of the Royal Burgh of Linlithgow, which continues to take part in the annual Riding of the Marches. On 8 November 1817, Mitchell carried on a family tradition by being admitted a Burgess and Guild Brother of Linlithgow.

In the early years of the business, Mitchell had to do a considerable amount of travelling, mainly on horseback, and he was a keen rider. His thrift is demonstrated in a letter to his mother, in which he wrote: “I live as frugally and cheaply as circumstances will allow.”

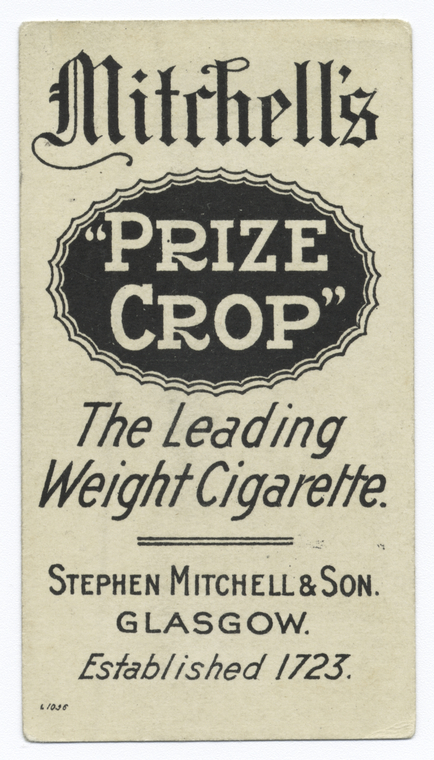
Reverse of cigarette card (Mrs. Leslie Carter from actors & actresses series) advertising Stephen Mitchell & Son's "Prize Crop", circa 1899.

Following the death of his father in July 1821, Stephen Mitchell took over the running of the business (the fourth of that name to do so), in partnership with his brother, Nelson (aka Neilson) Mitchell. From some letters dated 1822 between Stephen and Nelson it is gathered that both did a considerable amount of travelling for their business and, as they were keen riders, most of their journeys were done on horseback in preference to the coach.

In 1825, a change in import legislation and customs rules restricted the import of tobacco to a few designated chief ports with bonded warehouses. The port of Blackness on the Firth of Forth, historically the port of Linlithgow, was excluded from this change, and so Mitchell transferred the business of Stephen Mitchell & Son, wholesale tobacconist, to Glasgow, establishing new premises at 106 Candleriggs.

Despite competition from other tobacco manufacturing firms already established in the city, the business prospered and, by 1832, had prestigious premises at 49/52 (and later also 36) St. Andrew's Square, Glasgow. Mitchell initially set up home at 40 Charlotte Street in Glasgow but, subsequently, lived at 63 Abbotsford Place and, later, 144 West Campbell Street. In his will, Mitchell is also described as having been resident at 13 St. Enoch Square. Mitchell remained as Director of the business until 1869, leaving his brother, Nelson, sole partner. Stephen retired to the popular spa town of Moffat, Dumfriesshire, residing at Floral Cottage in Well Road. Nelson carried on the business until 1876, when he handed it over to his sons, Stephen and William Nelson Mitchell.

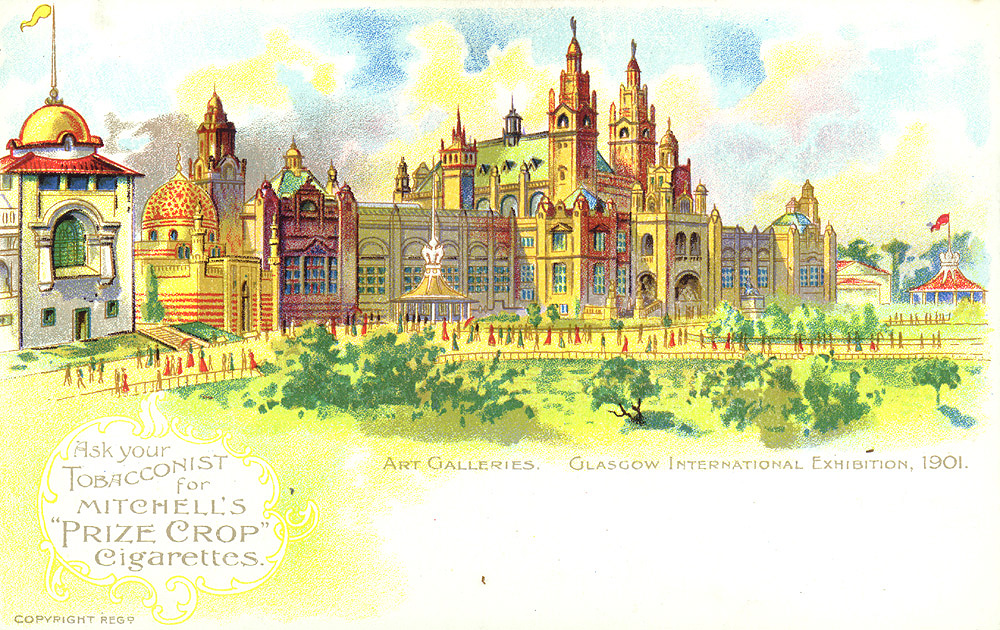
Postcard for Mitchell's 'Prize Crop' cigarettes - Kelvingrove 1901

== Death ==
Stephen Mitchell died at Moffat on 21 April 1874, the cause given as a fractured skull following a fall. A local newspaper reported what had happened:

It appears that Mr. Mitchell had gone out after nine o’clock, and had been seen in the forenoon near Archbank, as if going to the mineral well. As he had not returned in the afternoon, fears were entertained that, as he was in delicate health, some accident might have befallen him, and a search was made by the police and others. It was ascertained that Mr. Mitchell had not been at the well. On exploring the glen, his body was found at the bottom of a precipice and partly in the stream, about 150 yards beyond the well. Several severe wounds were on the head, and life had been extinct some hours.

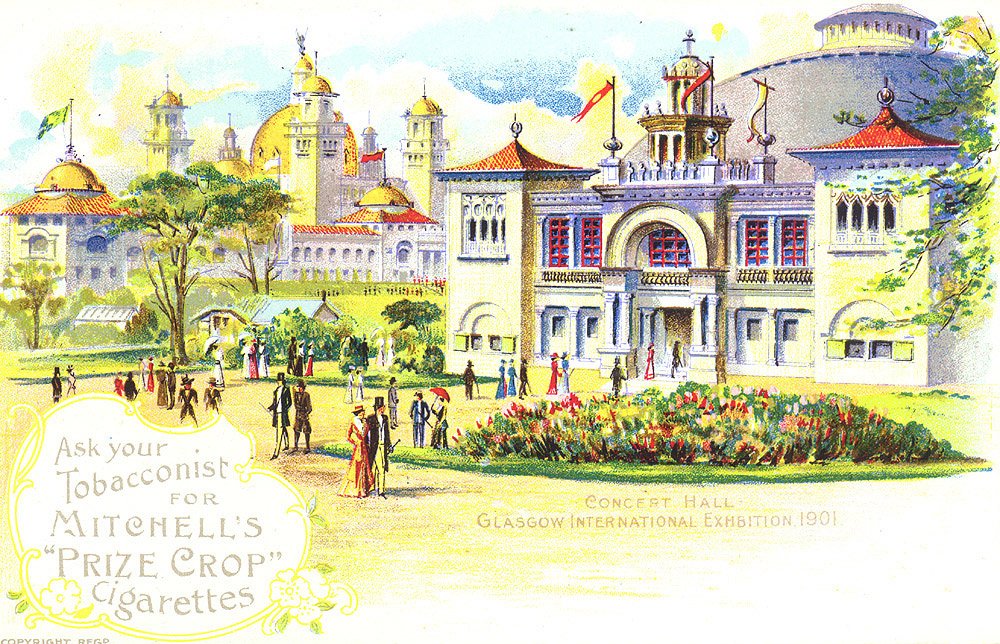
Postcard for Mitchell's 'Prize Crop' cigarettes - Concert Hall 1901

It is thought that Stephen Mitchell is buried at Linlithgow, his dates having been inscribed on the stone he placed on his parents’ grave in St. Michael’s Parish Church.

== Legacy ==
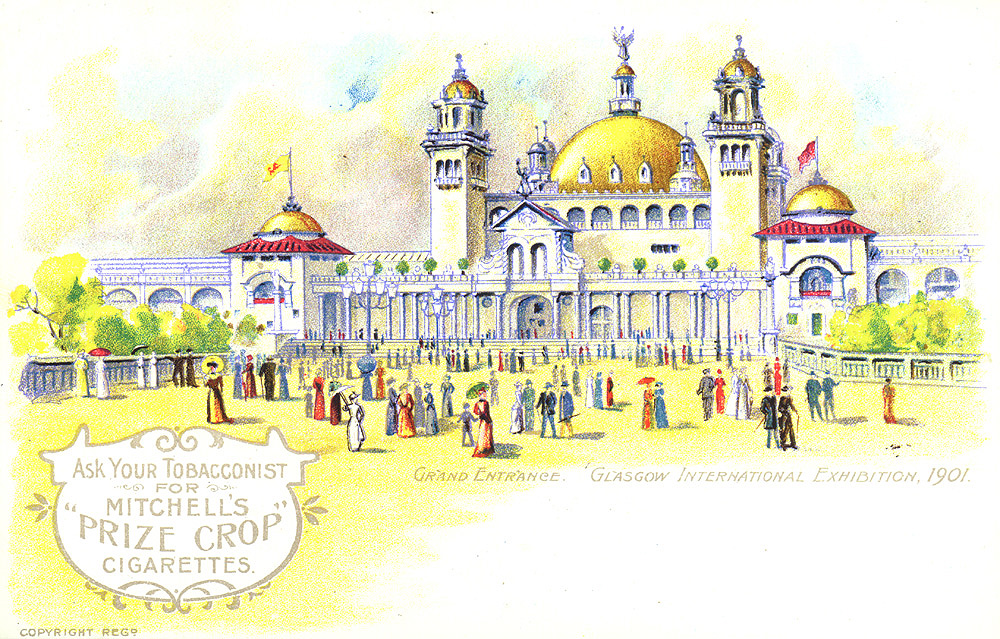
Postcard for Mitchell's 'Prize Crop' cigarettes - Grand Entrance to Glasgow International Exhibition 1901

Mitchell’s will indicated that, while he made his money from tobacco, he had invested his wealth almost exclusively in railways, mainly in Great Britain but also in North America. Having no direct descendants to whom he could leave his fortune, he made provision for legacies and annuities to extended family members, friends and employees as well as for a church - £500 to the Unitarian Congregation, St. Vincent Street, Glasgow - and for other charitable organisations such as Glasgow Royal Infirmary, charitable organisations such as Glasgow Asylum for the Blind, Glasgow Society for the Deaf and Dumb, and Glasgow Old Man’s Friendly Society.

Although he is thought not to have taken part in public affairs during his lifetime, Stephen Mitchell’s will also ensured provision of the residue of his estate, amounting to £66,998 10s. 6d., in a trust deed for the establishment and maintenance of a large public library "with all the modern accessories connected therewith." Rather than insisting that the library bore his name, he stated that his bequest should be the nucleus of the fund and allowed for “contributions from others”.

This public bequest was to be offered first to Glasgow but, if the City did not accept the conditions within six months, it was to be offered to Edinburgh. Glasgow Corporation was notified of the bequest on 6 May 1874, and it was formally accepted on 16 July of that year. Before adopting the Public Libraries (Scotland) Act 1854, Glasgow had utilised rate-levying powers in local acts to raise the required funding for continuing the maintenance of libraries.

According to Mitchell's stipulation, a constitution for the running of the library was later drawn up embodying the principal provisions of the trust deed, namely that the library was to be known as The Mitchell Library; that the amount of the bequest was to be allowed to remain at interest until it amounted to £70,000, or if thought necessary a larger sum, before a commencement was made; that in the selection of books to form the library, no books should be excluded on the ground that they contravene present opinions on politics or religion; that the library should be freely open to the public under suitable regulations; that contributions of money or of books might be accepted; and that collections of books might be kept together and known by the donor's or other distinctive name.

A Library Committee, appointed by Glasgow Town Council, and under the convenership of ex-Bailie James Salmon (architect, born 1805), proceeded with the organization of the library. In 1876, as a first step towards the implementation of Mitchell’s wishes, the Town Clerk, Dr. James David Marwick (1826-1908), drew up a report on the subject, which stated that “the committee see no reason why, under proper management, the Mitchell Library may not become…second only, as a public library, to that of the British Museum.” It points out that “care must specially be taken that no opportunities are lost of enriching the library, from time to time, with the rarer and more costly works which are only to be found in great libraries”. The report emphasises the classless nature of the library as “the command of such appliances of knowledge as the Mitchell Library will offer to every person in Glasgow, is a boon which cannot be regarded as in any sense limited to a class.” A final quotation stresses that “adequate provision should be made at the first for indefinite future expansion. The situation of such a building should be central and the building itself worthy of Glasgow.”

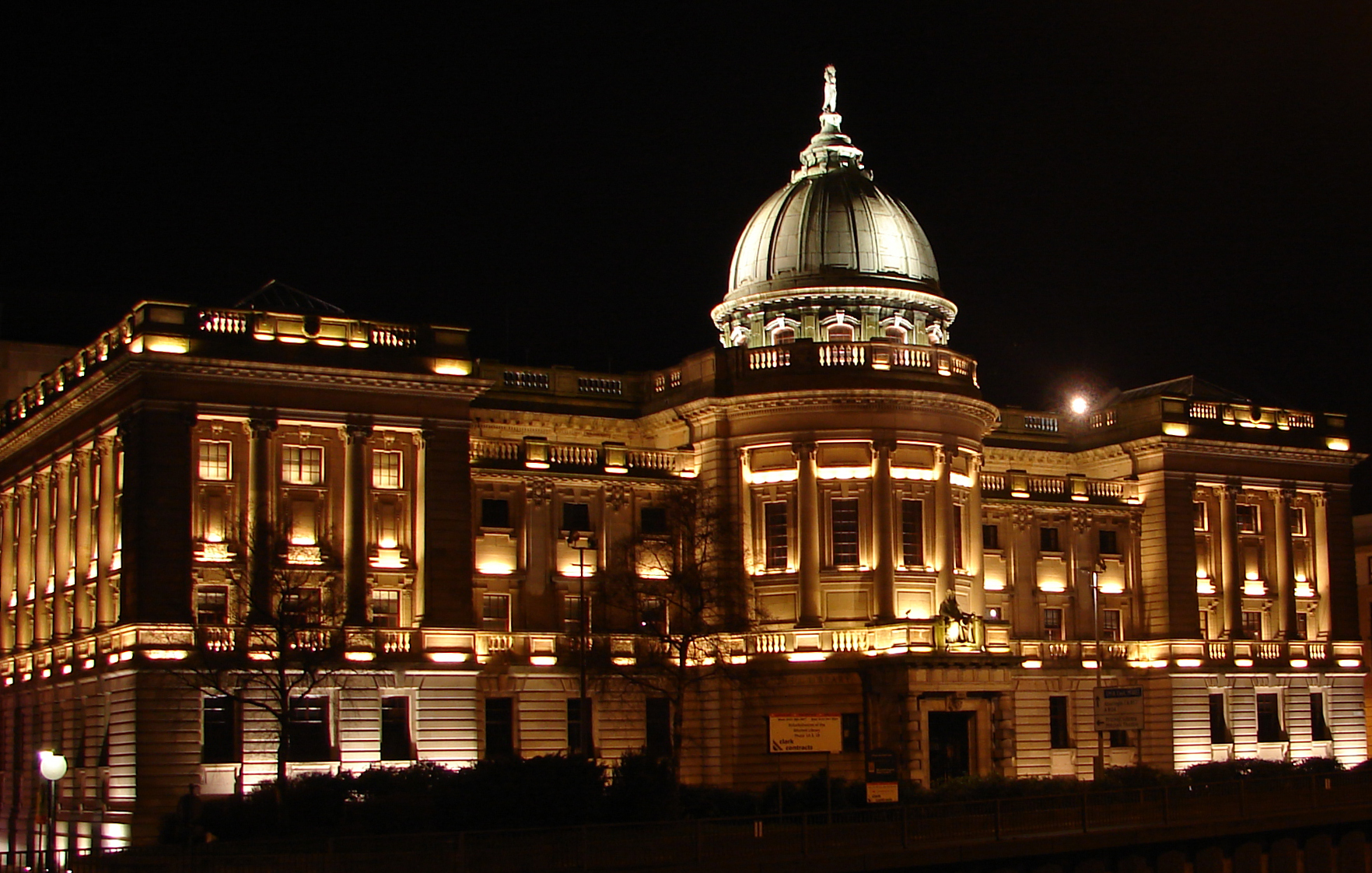
Mitchell library

The Mitchell Library was formally opened on 1 November 1877, by the Hon. James Bain, Lord Provost and on Monday 5 November its doors were opened to the public. By 1977, it laid claim to being the largest public reference library in Europe.

It is thought that Mitchell’s bequest may have been prompted by his wide reading and his interest in self-improvement. He is said to have encouraged and assisted the boys and girls in his employment to attend evening classes at Glasgow’s recently founded Andersonian Institution, and thus led the way to the institution of tobacco boys' night schools. He also spent much of his time in the backroom of the bookseller’s shop which housed the Moffat Subscription Library where “in congenial companionship he talked in appreciative insight of books”. This library had been established in the year of Mitchell’s birth by James Clarke (1761-1825), the Rector of Moffat Grammar School, at the suggestion of his friend and fellow Dumfriesshire resident, Robert Burns, who also donated a number of books. Mitchell is also said to have delighted in Burns’ association with the library. Another suggested influence on Mitchell’s bequest is the minister who had baptised him, The Rev. Robert Henry (1718-1790). Henry was also a historian who had wished to bequeath his books to the Town Council of Linlithgow for the establishment of a public library there, but this is said not to have materialised because of the poor wording of his will.

== Stephen Mitchell & Son ==
After Stephen Mitchell’s death, his brother Nelson (aka Neilson) Mitchell took over the business; being succeeded, in turn, by Nelson's son, also named Stephen Mitchell (1847-1920) of Boquhan, Stirlingshire.

The Imperial Tobacco Company (Great Britain and Ireland) Ltd. was created in December 1901 through the amalgamation of 13 British tobacco and cigarette manufacturing companies which were being threatened by competition from the American Tobacco Company: initially W. D. & H. O. Wills of Bristol merged with Stephen Mitchell & Son and, subsequently, other smaller companies joined in the amalgamation. However, Stephen Mitchell & Son continued to trade under its own name and retained responsibility for its own manufacturing and selling until well into the 20th century.

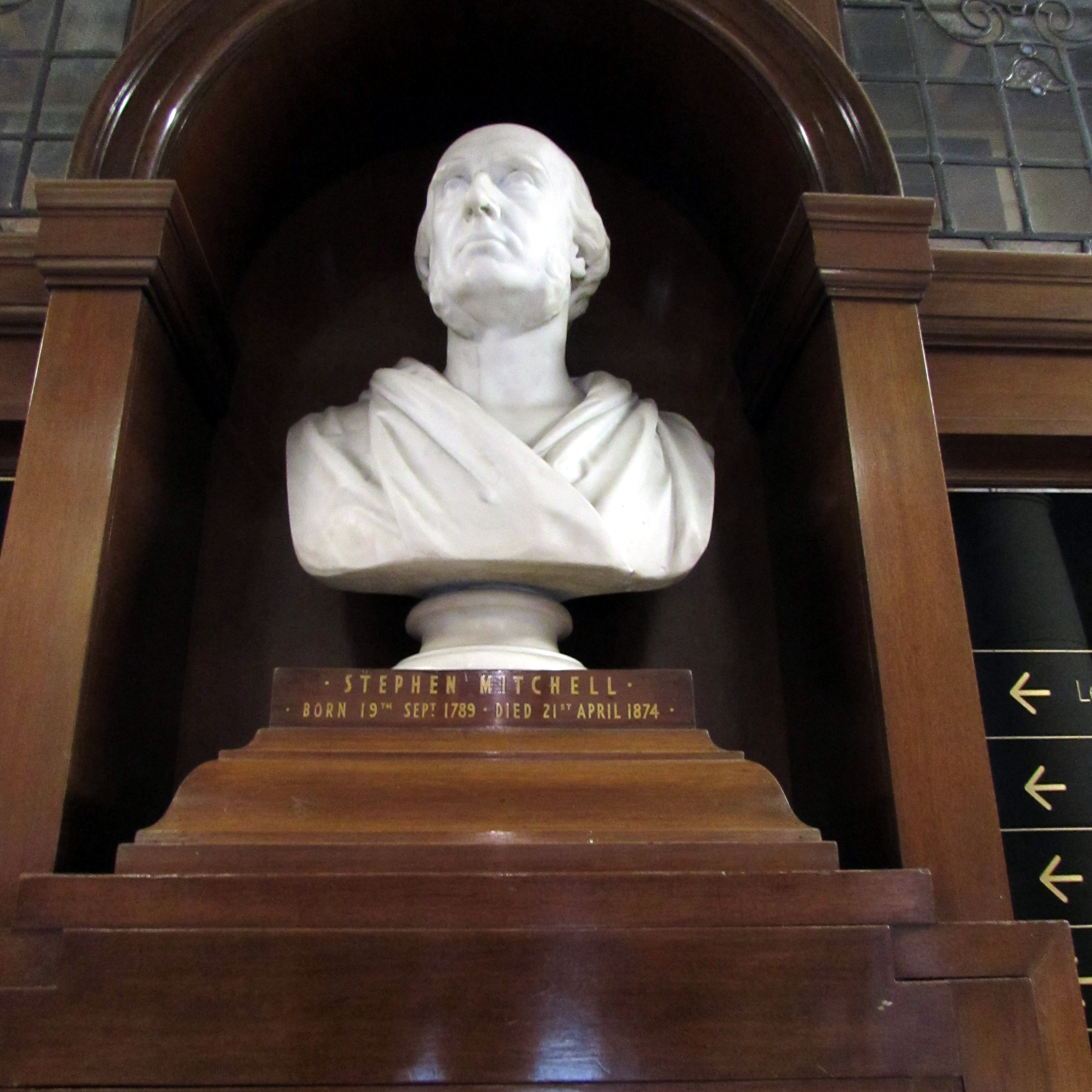
Commemorative portrait bust of Stephen Mitchell (1789-1874), completed in 1881, at North Street interior of Mitchell Library, by John Mossman (1817-1890)

== Likenesses ==
A rare silhouette portrait of Stephen Mitchell as a younger man was donated to the Mitchell Library on 18 March 2015 by Lord Nimmo Smith, one of his cousins having been the direct descendant of Stephen Mitchell’s brother. A copy of this silhouette was lent by Mrs. Tod of Moffat - née Dorothea Thomson (1831-1894), the widow of Stephen's nephew, James Thomas (1827-1865) - to sculptor John Mossman (1817-1890) for the purpose of creating a portrait bust in clay; apart from that, Mossman had only a single photograph of Stephen Mitchell, shown with a book on a table beside him, from which to work. Commissioned posthumously by the City Council, Mossman's finished marble commemorative bust was completed in 1881, and is on display at the entrance to the Mitchell Library at 201 North Street. A contemporary account describes how it was received:

Those who knew Mr, Mitchell are of opinion that notwithstanding the want of any but very slight materials, Mr. Mossman has succeeded in producing a bust which is excellent as a likeness, as it is acknowledged by all who have seen it to be admirable as a work of art.
