= Francis Thornton Barrett =

Scottish librarian

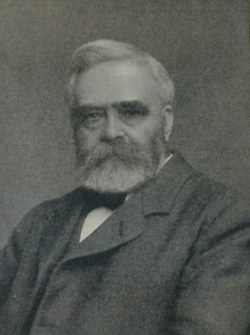
- Born: 20 September 1838; Liverpool
- Died: 21 January 1919 (aged 80); Glasgow
- Occupation: Librarian
- Employer: Glasgow Town Council/The Corporation of the City of Glasgow
- Title: Mitchell Librarian; City Librarian
- Predecessor: N/A
- Successor: Septimus Pitt
- Spouse: Elizabeth Jane Trengrouse (1842–1881)
- Children: Franklin Trengrouse Barrett (1866-1905)

Francis Thornton Barrett (20 September 1838 – 21 January 1919), LL.D., was the first Librarian (from 1877 to 1899) of The Mitchell Library in Glasgow, Lanarkshire. As City Librarian (from May 1901 to 1914), he initiated and developed public libraries throughout the city. He was also a founding member, and the first President (from 1908 to 1910), of the Scottish Library Association.

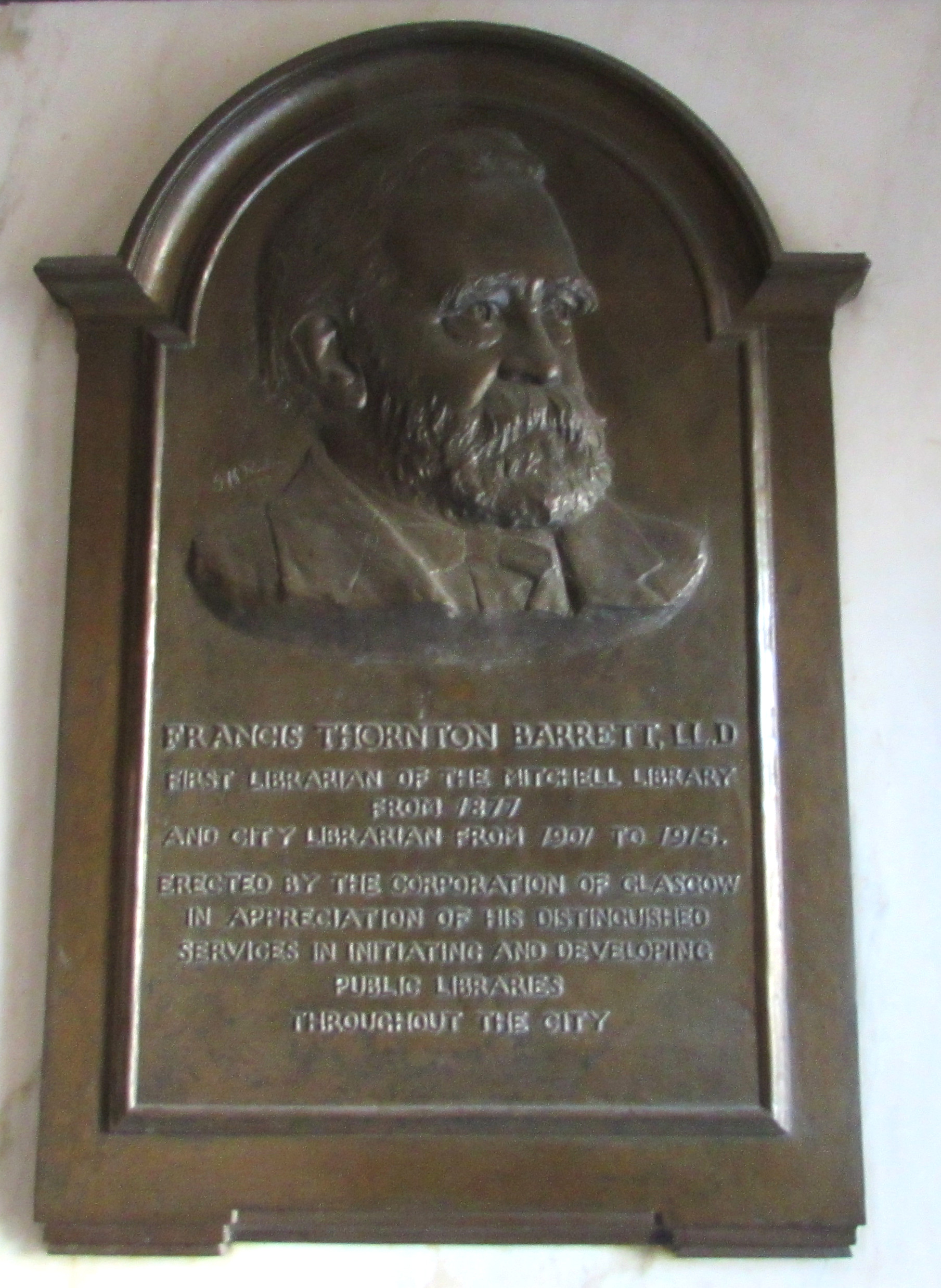
FRANCIS THORNTON BARRETT (21858617076)

== Early life ==
Francis Thornton Barrett, born on 20 September 1838 at Liverpool, Lancashire, England, was the eldest of five children. His father, the Rev. John Barrett (1812–1884), was a congregational minister, who entered into public religious work in the Liverpool Town Mission, later undertaking the charge of home mission stations and pastorates in a number of places including Little Lever, near Bolton (in 1848), Sedgley and Coleshill. His father's family was resident for several generations in Gloucestershire and Worcestershire. His mother was Mary Ann Thornton (1808–1885), daughter of William Thornton, of London.

== Writings ==
As a founding member, a Fellow, and the first President (from 1908 to 1910), of the Scottish Library Association, Barrett contributed papers on various points of professional practice to its annual conference and to the professional journals.

== Personal life ==
In July 1863, in Aston, Warwickshire, Barrett married Elizabeth Jane Trengrouse (1842–1881). The Barratts’ son, Franklin Trengrouse Barrett, was born on 15 April 1866 in Birmingham. Franklin followed his father into the library profession, becoming Librarian for Fulham Public Libraries from 1903 until his sudden death on 9 October 1905. From 1872 to 1876, the family lived at 37 Lee Crescent, Edgbaston, Birmingham. In April 1881, father and son were living at 60 Victoria Road, Glasgow. By April 1891, they were residing at "Holly Bank", Crow Road in Partick.

== Public life ==
In 1852, Barrett was apprenticed to a bookseller and printer at Bolton, in Lancashire, and was connected with those trades in Lancashire and later in Birmingham until 1866. In August 1866, he joined Birmingham Public Libraries where he served as Sub-Librarian of the Reference Department. In 1873, he is listed as Assistant Librarian of the Free Library, Ratcliff Place (Birmingham Central Free Library).

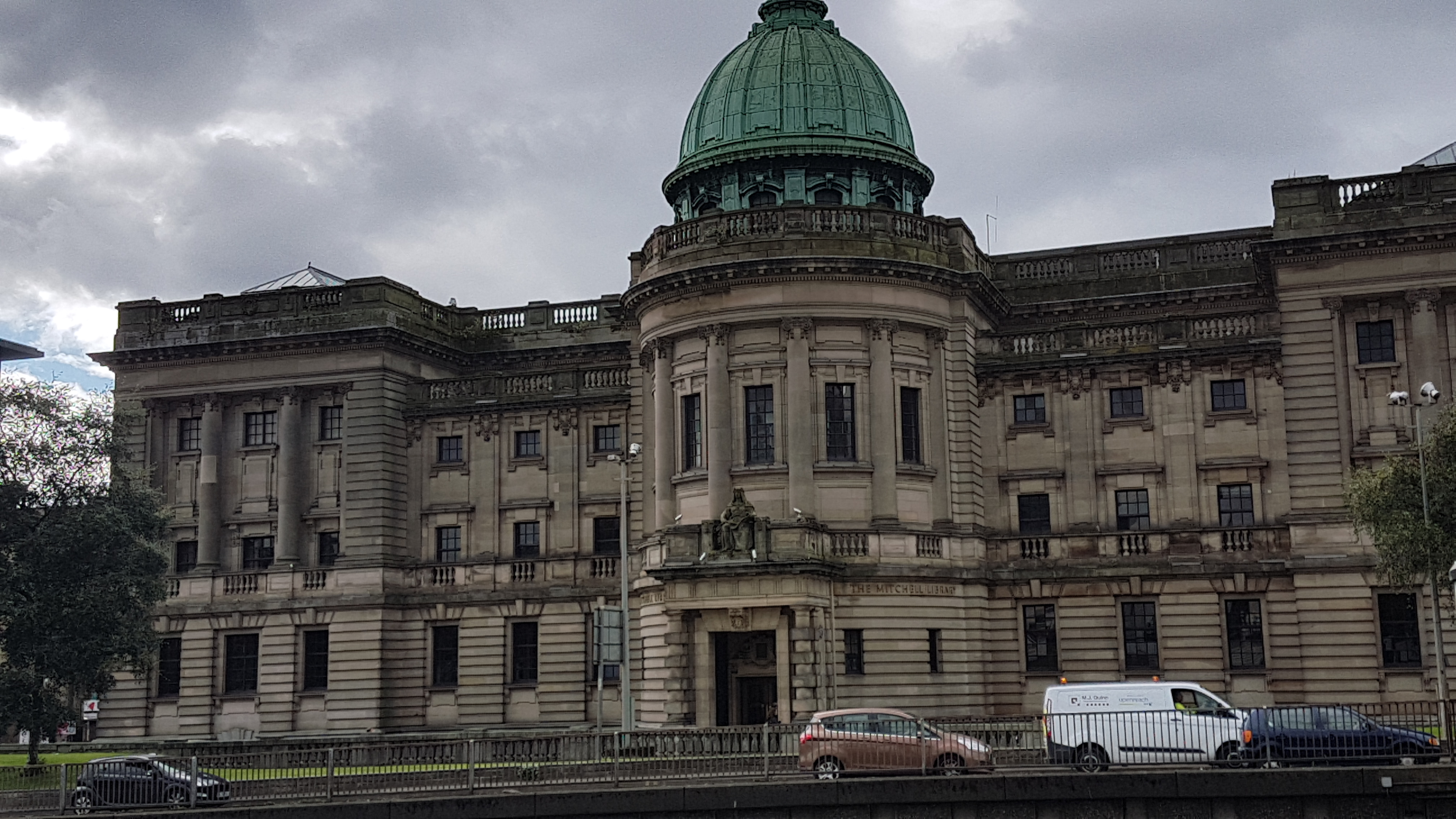
The Mitchell Library, Glasgow

In November 1876, Barrett became a candidate for the post of Librarian of the Mitchell Library, Glasgow, then about to be commenced. His appointment was approved by Glasgow Town Council in February 1877, and he entered on the duties of the post on 15 March of that year. On 1 November 1877, in temporary premises at 60 Ingram Street, the Mitchell Library was opened to the public by Lord Provost Sir James Bain. Having been moved to larger accommodation at 21 Miller Street, Glasgow, the Mitchell Library was reopened by the Marquess of Bute on 7 October 1891.

In 1899, the passing of the Glasgow Corporation (Tramways, Libraries, etc.) Act enabled the establishment of a system of lending libraries for which Barrett was made responsible. The title Mitchell Librarian was later changed to that of the City Librarian, responsible for all the libraries in Glasgow. Following the decision of the corporation to establish district libraries in different parts of the city, Barrett was nominated City Librarian in May 1901. The City Librarian still kept overall responsibility for the Mitchell Library, but the day-to-day organisation was then in the care of a Chief Assistant.

The accommodation provided at 21 Miller Street proved still inadequate for the requirements of the library, and the corporation began to erect a new building in North Street in January 1907. In September of that year, the building's foundation stone was laid by Andrew Carnegie on the occasion of the annual Conference of the Library Association, of which Barrett was president, which that year was held in Glasgow.

A member of Glasgow Corporation from 1907 to 1910, Barrett's character was drawn in the following poetical sketch - which also alludes to the growth of the library and its new building - composed by one of his colleagues:

IN Barrett here behold the man

Who guards our precious store

Of treasures culled from every lan'

Of literary lore.

Wi' miser care he tends his charge,

Still adding to his pile,

As year by year his cares enlarge

Replenishing the while.

Well read himself, his cultured mind

Can spot where genius lies,

And guide at once wherein to find

The gems of purest dyes.

Child of the manse, his early years

In books and study spent,

Laid deep the found on which uprears

His lasting monument.

Built from the purest mines of thought,

That all may read and learn,

The truths by art and science taught,

And how their fruits to earn.

He reigns supreme, his subjects all

Obedient to his will,

Are ready at his beck and call

To show their wonders still.

Their marshalled ranks he views with pride,

Increasing year by year,

Drawn from all lands the world wide,

And ever to him dear.

The new Library was officially opened by the 5th Earl of Rosebery, on 16 October 1911, and opened to the public three days later.

Barrett received an honorary degree of Doctor of Laws from Glasgow University in 1913.

== Later life ==
Following his resignation, in February 1914, the Corporation agreed to Barrett's suggestion that he continue to work for them in an advisory capacity. He came daily to the Mitchell Library until shortly before his death, at home, on 21 January 1919.

== Posthumous reputation ==
Barrett has been credited with the suggestion of establishing the “Scottish Poetry Collection”, one of the Mitchell Library's fundamental collections, to match the “Shakespeare Memorial Library” which had been formed in Birmingham's Central Reference Library.
