= Will You Marry Me? (disambiguation) =

"Will You Marry Me?" is a 1992 single by Paula Abdul.

Will You Marry Me? may also refer to:

- Will You Marry Me? (opera), a 1989 opera by Hugo Weisgall
- Mujhse Shaadi Karogi (lit. 'Will You Marry Me?'), a 2004 Indian Hindi-language romantic comedy film by David Dhawan
- Mujhse Shaadi Karoge (lit. 'Will You Marry Me?'), an Indian reality television show
- Will You Marry Me? (film), a 2012 Indian romantic comedy

== See also ==
- Will You Merry Me?, a 2008 American television Christmas film
- Marriage proposal, an event where one person asks for the other's hand in marriage
- Marry Me (disambiguation)
