= Cockcroft =

Cockcroft or Cockroft is a surname. Notable people with the surname include:

Cockcroft:

- Barry Cockcroft (1933–2001), British television documentary director
- Barry Cockcroft (dentist), Chief Dental Officer (CDO) for England
- Bill Cockcroft, former Chief Scout Commissioner of England
- Colin Cockcroft (1918–1987), South African military commander
- Donald William Cockcroft (1946–), Canadian asthmologist; see Cockcroft-Gault formula
- George Cockcroft (1932–2020), American novelist who published under the name Luke Rhinehart
- Sir John Douglas Cockcroft (1897–1967), British nuclear physicist
  - The Cockcroft Institute, British research centre for accelerator physics named after Sir John D. Cockcroft
  - Cockcroft, lunar crater named after Sir John D. Cockcroft
- John Hoyle Cockcroft (1934–2023), British Conservative politician
- Shamshad Cockcroft, British physiologist
- Vic Cockcroft (born 1941), English footballer
- Wilfred Cockcroft (1923–1999), English mathematician

Cockroft:

- Don Cockroft (born 1945), American football player
- Hannah Cockroft (born 1992), British athlete, gold medallist at the 2012 and 2016 Paralympics
- Joe Cockroft (1911–1994), English footballer
- Lana Coc-Kroft (born 1967), New Zealand television and radio personality
- Peter Cockroft (born 1957), British weather forecaster
- Josh Cockroft (born 1989), Oklahoma Representative
