= Marry You (disambiguation) =

"Marry You" is a 2011 single by Bruno Mars.

Marry You may also refer to:

- Marry You (TV series), a 2024 South Korean television series
- "Marry You", by Diamond Platnumz from A Boy from Tandale, 2018
- "Marry You", by Shinee from Don't Call Me, 2021

== See also ==
- Marry Me (disambiguation)
- Marry Me, Marry You, a Philippine television drama series
- Mary Yu, associate justice of the Washington Supreme Court
