= The Little White Car =

Book by Dan Rhodes

- First edition cover (with quote from Jenny Colgan)
- Author: Danuta de Rhodes
- Language: English
- Publisher: Canongate
- Publication date: 2004
- Publication place: United Kingdom
- Media type: Print
- Pages: 262
- ISBN: 0-7394-5157-X

The Little White Car is a novel by British author Dan Rhodes, published under the pen name Danuta de Rhodes in 2004 by Canongate. It has been translated into 12 languages. The book is based on an imaginative fictional elaboration of the actual forensic evidence that the Mercedes carrying Diana, Princess of Wales had had a glancing contact with another car, believed to be a white Fiat Uno at some point before it crashed in the Pont de l'Alma tunnel in Paris on 31 August 1997. The French investigation did not identify the car or the driver. A conspiracy theory developed around the white Fiat Uno.

== Plot ==
In Paris, Veronique has just split up with her boyfriend and is driving home in her "little white car." While passing through a tunnel in central Paris, a large car approaches from behind at high speed. Veronique is determined not to let it pass, and it collides with the back of her car and crashes. Seeing the news the next morning, Veronique realizes that she killed a princess. The remainder of the book tells of Veronique's life and loves before the crash, and the subsequent efforts to conceal her involvement.
