= The Drosten's Curse =

2015 Doctor Who novel

- Author: A. L. Kennedy
- Language: English
- Series: Doctor Who
- Genre: Science fiction
- Published: July 14, 2015 (Crown)
- Publication place: United Kingdom
- Media type: Print (paperback)
- Pages: 368
- ISBN: 9780553419443

The Drosten's Curse is a 2015 Doctor Who novel written by A. L. Kennedy. Starting life off as a short story called The Death Pit, Kennedy expanded the story to novel length for publication. The move was called unexpected by some, as they did not expect for Kennedy to take that career path.

The novel received broadly positive reviews from critics, although the praise was not universal.

== Synopsis ==
When the Doctor arrives at the Fetch Brothers' Golf Sap Hotel, he meets receptionist Bryony in the midst of something alien waking up.

== Reception ==
The book received overall positive reviews from critics, with Stuart Kelly of The Independent called it, "enjoyable and affecting as any other Kennedy novel" and stated that it captured the feeling of Doctor Who well. The Scotsman called it, "a very human book" and praised the chemistry between Bryony and the bounty hunter. Blogtor Who gave it a 10/10, praising the character development and the chapter flow.

Other reviews were slightly more critical. Nerdist praised the writing, but criticized the narrative and the lack of development for non-Doctor characters. Similarly, Doctor Who TV, who noted the original short story needed more development, called it fun, but often felt it "rambles at time[s]" and "at times, stumble[s] from an overdose on whimsy".
