= Marry Me a Little =

"Marry Me a Little" is a song from the 1970 musical Company, with music and lyrics by Stephen Sondheim.

Marry Me a Little may also refer to:

- Marry Me a Little (musical), a 1980 Off-Off-Broadway revue of songs by Sondheim
- "Marry Me a Little, Marry Me a Little More", a 2002 episode of Will & Grace
- "Marry Me a Little" (Desperate Housewives), a 2009 episode

== See also ==
- Marry Me (disambiguation)
