= Shamshad Cockcroft =

British physiologist

- Shamshad Salehbhai Jafferji
- Born: Zanzibar
- Education: University of Manchester (BSc); University of Birmingham (PhD)
- Spouse: Laurence Cockcroft
- Children: Jasmine, Jacob and Joshua
- Scientific career
- Fields: Lipid mediated Signalling
- Workplaces: University College London
- Thesis: A role for phosphatidylinositol metabolism in the mechanism of receptor action particularly in the muscarinic cholinergic receptor (1977)
- Website: www.ucl.ac.uk/biosciences/people/cockcroft-shamshad

Shamshad Cockcroft is a British physiologist and a professor of cell physiology in the Neuro, Physiology and Pharmacology Division of Biosciences at the UCL. She has been a member of The Physiological Society since 1989.

== Education ==
Cockcroft earned a degree in Biological Chemistry at the University of Manchester in 1974 and completed her PhD in Biochemistry at the University of Birmingham in 1977. During her PhD she was introduced by Bob Michell to the subject of inositol lipids as a potential source of second messengers, a topic she pursued during her postdoctoral fellowship at University College London (UCL).

== Research ==
Cockcroft's research and work investigates intracellular lipid traffic, interfaces club and lipids in cell signalling and membrane traffic. Her publications include: ATP induces nucleotide permeability in rat mast cells, Role of guanine nucleotide binding protein in the activation of polyphosphoinositide phosphodiesterase and Polyphosphoinositide phosphodiesterase: regulation by a novel guanine nucleotide binding protein, Gp.

Cockcroft was awarded a fellowship from the Lister Institute in 1986 and established the Lipid Signalling Group at UCL. She was previously Chair in Cell Biology at UCL and was awarded a programme grant by the Wellcome Trust.

== Personal life ==
Cockcroft was born in Zanzibar, but moved to the United Kingdom aged 18 following the Zanzibar Revolution. She faced problems when she tried to apply for university, having only four O-levels in Maths, English, British Constitution and Geography. She had to do her A-levels in a grammar school in the UK. She was inspired to pursue a career in science by reading biographies of scientists, including William Harvey and Marie Curie.

She is married to Laurence Cockcroft and has three children: Jasmine, Jacob and Joshua.
