= Anthropology: And a Hundred Other Stories =

- First edition (UK)
- Author: Dan Rhodes
- Cover artist: Chris Shamwana
- Language: English
- Genre: Short stories
- Publisher: Fourth Estate (UK); Villard (US)
- Publication date: 2000
- Publication place: United Kingdom
- Media type: Print & ebook
- Pages: 208
- ISBN: 1-84115-193-9

Anthropology: And a Hundred Other Stories is a book by British author Dan Rhodes published in 2000 by Fourth Estate. It has since been republished by Canongate who have made it available as an ebook. It consists of 101 tales; each of 101 words, all about girlfriends and has been published in seven languages. It was written between October 1997 and November 1998 whilst the author was fruit picking on a farm. It has been compared to Roland Barthes' A Lover's Discourse.

== Reception ==
- the Complete Review assessed the collection having "some clever bits, but too much that's forced and unimaginative" and concludes: "Anthropology is an uneven collection. Readers' patience presumably will vary, but it's hard to think of more than a fifth of these as successful. Too often they are wildly but not well imagined. They are such small, quick reads that the many failures and disappointments can be overlooked, but it still makes for a mighty thin read".
- Lori Leibovich in The New York Times Book Review writes "Rhodes should be commended for his economy of words and his outrageous humor. But after a while, the stories become predictable and the one-note theme - the irony and agony of relationships - grows tired. Reading these tales is like sitting at a bar next to a lonely heart who won't stop rattling on about his amorous woes. At first you're sympathetic, then you start to wish he'd go away".

Other reviews were more positive :

- Gareth Evans in The Independent: "Effortless to read, amusing, and yet coloured by a deep sadness about the passing of things, these prose haikus display a psychological and verbal precision that ranges across anecdote, character and, sometimes, a whole compressed life."
- Elizabeth Judge in The Times: "A hilarious exploration of the challenges posed by the fairer sex. Despite being written from a male perspective, it will entertain any woman who can laugh at her own foibles."

== Film adaptation ==
Five of the stories have been adapted into short films by Victor Solomon, and there are plans to produce thirty in total to be released exclusively via mobile/tablet App for which funding is being sought.
