= A. L. Kennedy =

Scottish writer and comedian (born 1965)

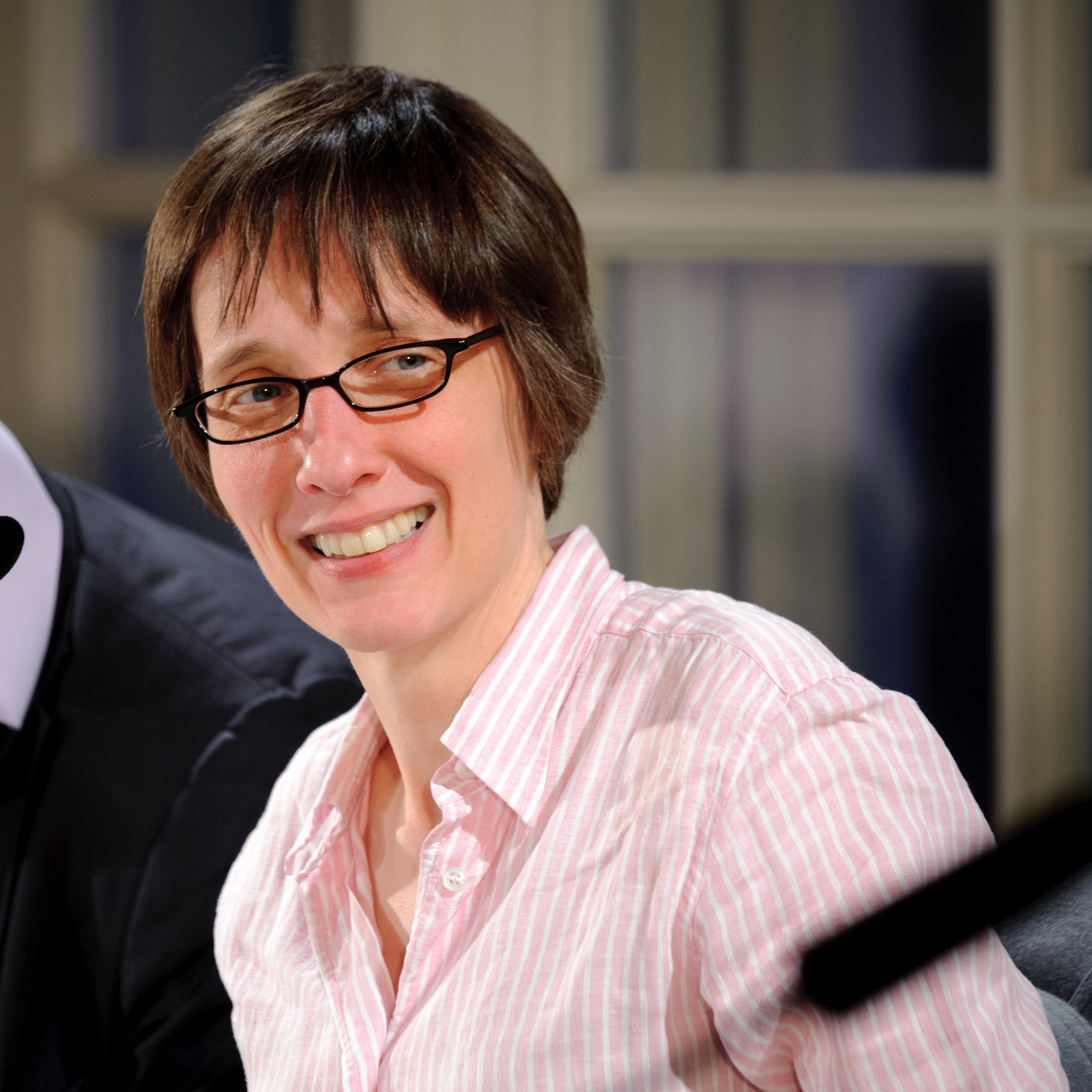
- A.L. Kennedy in 2012
- Born: Alison Louise Kennedy; 22 October 1965 (age 61); Dundee, Scotland
- Citizenship: United Kingdom
- Education: University of Warwick
- Occupations: Writer, academic, comedian
- Website: www.a-l-kennedy.co.uk

Alison Louise Kennedy (born 22 October 1965) is a Scottish writer, academic and stand-up comedian. She writes novels, short stories and non-fiction, and is known for her dark tone and her blending of realism and fantasy. She contributes columns and reviews to European newspapers.

== Biography ==
Kennedy was born in Dundee to Edwardene Mildred, a teacher, and Robert Alan Kennedy, a psychology lecturer. Her parents divorced when she was 13. She attended the fee-paying High School of Dundee and went on to study for a BA Hons degree in Theatre Studies and Dramatic Arts at the University of Warwick.

From 1987 to 1989, Kennedy was a community arts worker for Clydebank District Council. She then went on to a role as writer-in-residence for Hamilton and East Kilbride Social Work Department from 1989 to 1991. Her work there won a special Social Work Today Award in 1990. From 1989 to 1995 she worked on Project Ability, a Glasgow-based visual arts organisation. In 1995 she was a part-time lecturer at the University of Copenhagen.

In 2009, she donated the short story Vanish to Oxfam's Ox-Tales project, four collections of stories written by 38 authors. Her story was published in the "Air" collection. In 2016, her novel Serious Sweet was long-listed for the Booker Prize.

In December 2019, along with 42 other leading cultural figures, she signed a letter endorsing the Labour Party under Jeremy Corbyn's leadership in the 2019 general election. The letter stated that "Labour's election manifesto under Jeremy Corbyn's leadership offers a transformative plan that prioritises the needs of people and the planet over private profit and the vested interests of a few."

In 2020, she began contributing a column on her views of Brexit to the German daily paper Süddeutsche Zeitung.

Kennedy currently lives in the Scottish Highlands, having moved from Wivenhoe and has been an associate professor in creative writing at the University of Warwick since 2007, having previously taught creative writing at the University of St Andrews from 2003 to 2007.

By 2006, she had been doing stand up comedy performances in clubs in Scotland. She has performed as a stand-up comedian at the Edinburgh Fringe and literary festivals. Her main comedy club has been The Stand Comedy Club in Edinburgh.

Her 2023 novel Als lebten wir in einem barmherzigen Land was first published in German rather than in the original English.

== Awards and honours ==
- Scottish Arts Council Book Award four times
- 1993, 2003 Granta Best Young British Novelist
- 1991 Saltire Society Scottish First Book of the Year, Night Geometry and the Garscadden Trains
- 1993 Edinburgh Fringe First, The Audition
- 1994 Somerset Maugham Award, Looking for the Possible Dance
- 1996 Encore Award winner, So I Am Glad
- 1999 Elected Fellow of the Royal Society of Literature
- 2007 Saltire Society Scottish Book of the Year, Day
- 2007 Lannan Literary Award for Fiction
- 2007 Austrian State Prize for European Literature winner
- 2007 Costa Book Awards Book of the Year, winner for Day
- 2008 Internationale Eifel-Literatur-Preis
- 2014 Frank O'Connor International Short Story Award shortlist All the Rage
- 2016 Heinrich Heine Prize
- 2016 Ehrenpreis des Österreichischen Buchhandels für Toleranz in Denken und Handeln

== Works ==
=== Novels ===
- Looking for the Possible Dance (1993) ISBN 978-0-7493-9758-6
- So I Am Glad (1995) ISBN 978-0-09-945721-3
- Everything You Need (1999) ISBN 978-0-09-973061-3
- Paradise (2004) ISBN 978-0-09-943349-1
- Day (2007) ISBN 978-0-09-949405-8
- The Blue Book (2011) ISBN 978-0-224-09140-4
- Doctor Who: The Drosten's Curse (2015) ISBN 978-0-553-41944-3
- Serious Sweet (2016) ISBN 978-0-224-09844-1
- The Little Snake (2018) ISBN 978-1786893864
- Alive in the Merciful Country (2024) ISBN 978-1916812284
  - German: Als lebten wir in einem barmherzigen Land (2023) ISBN 978-3-446-27624-6

=== Short story collections ===
- Night Geometry and the Garscadden Trains (1990) ISBN 978-0-09-945006-1
- Now That You're Back (1994) ISBN 978-0-09-945711-4
- Tea and Biscuits (1996) ISBN 978-1-85799-757-6
- Original Bliss (1997) ISBN 978-0-09-973071-2
- Indelible Acts (2002) ISBN 978-0-09-943348-4
- What Becomes (2009) ISBN 978-0-224-07787-3
- All the Rage (2014) ISBN 978-0544307049
- We Are Attempting to Survive Our Time (2020) ISBN 978-1787331822

=== Non-fiction ===
- Life & Death of Colonel Blimp (1997) ISBN 0-85170-568-5
- On Bullfighting (1999) ISBN 0-224-06099-6
- On Writing (2013) ISBN 978-0-224-09697-3

=== Film and TV ===
- "Stella Does Tricks" (1996) Channel 4 films
- "Dice" (2001), with John Burnside

=== Selected radio ===
- Confessions of a Medium (2010), broadcast as the Saturday Play on BBC Radio 4, 13 March 2010 and 1 March 2013
- Happy Families (2011), broadcast on BBC Radio 3, 1 September 2011
- Love Love Love Like The Beatles (2012), broadcast as the Afternoon Drama on BBC Radio 4, 26 June 2012
- AA: America's Gift to the World (2014), broadcast on BBC Radio 4, 6 April 2015
- Subterranean Homesick Blues (5 series beginning 2015), broadcast on BBC Radio 4 from 14 September 2015
- A Single Act (first broadcast on BBC Radio 4 25th Dec, 2023)
