= Day (Kennedy novel) =

Novel by A. L. Kennedy

- First edition
- Author: A. L. Kennedy
- Language: English
- Publisher: Jonathan Cape
- Publication date: 5 April 2007
- Publication place: United Kingdom
- Media type: Print (hardback)
- Pages: 288
- ISBN: 0-224-07786-4

Day is a novel by A. L. Kennedy. It won the novel category and the overall Costa Book of the Year Award in the 2007 Costa Book Awards. The novel is about a man who was a tailgunner in a Lancaster bomber aircraft during World War II. Later, he is an extra in a film about prisoners of war.
