= Don't Tell Me the Truth About Love =

2001 short story collection by Dan Rhodes

- First edition (UK)
- Author: Dan Rhodes
- Language: English
- Publisher: Fourth Estate (UK)
- Publication date: 2001
- Publication place: United Kingdom
- Media type: Print & ebook
- Pages: 192
- ISBN: 1-84115-195-5

Don't Tell Me the Truth About Love is a short story collection by British author Dan Rhodes, first published in 2001 by Fourth Estate (HarperCollins). It was the first book written by the author while he was living on London Road, Sheffield between 1996 and 1997, but was his second book published. It has since been translated into five languages.

== Stories ==
1. "The Carolingian Period" : An architecture professor giving a tutorial on "Ecclesiastical structures of the Carolingian Period" (including music by Terry Edwards) is suddenly struck by the beauty of the young student before him and longs to be young again...
2. "The Violoncello" : Set in modern day Vietnam it concerns Ngoc, a talented self-taught cellist, who three days a week practices on the steps of the Library of Social Sciences. She draws a regular crowd to hear her, amongst them is Tuan who becomes infatuated with Ngoc and determines to become her 'cello...
3. "Glass Eyes" : Deep in a forest a young man sleeps on a heart shaped bed with his older one-eyed lover. She asks him if he will show his love for her by becoming like her and asks him to give her his left eye...
4. "Mademoiselle Arc-en-ciel": A man and his landlord both fall in love with a beautiful neighbour...
5. "Landfill" : In which a man breaks into a landfill site to dispose of his rubbish and meets a beautiful woman and returns again and again to see her. But the woman is obsessed with landfill...
6. "The Painting" : In a clearing deep in the woods an artist paints a staggeringly beautiful picture of a woman. All who see it are unable to take their eyes off it, and never escape...
7. "Beautiful Consuela" : A woman tests the love of her husband to destruction...

== Reception ==
- Simon Beckett writing in The Guardian is very positive: "The bottom line to this collection of short stories by British writer Dan Rhodes is that love hurts. Not news in itself, perhaps, but Rhodes's stories blow through the cobwebs of a much-handled subject like fresh air... The simplicity of Rhodes's style might be reminiscent of folklore and fairy tales, but that doesn't stop him getting to the heart of the matter."
- Michael Dirda in The Washington Post strikes a note of warning, "In form, Rhodes's stories resemble magical-realist fables or grim fairy tales. The style is seemingly artless, deliberately flat, sometimes even clichéd. There's a kind of deadness at the heart of his sentences, as though all the emotion had been beaten out of them. If a zombie could write, it would sound about as lively as Dan Rhodes." but goes on to say "there's no denying the visceral power of his contes cruels. They stick in your mind, and the more you think about them the richer and more disheartening they become." He concludes "Don't Tell Me the Truth About Love is a powerful and impressive collection but very, very bleak. It's probably not the book to give your sweetie on February 14. You'd do better to stick with candy and flowers."
- Gregory Cowles on The New York Times was unimpressed though, "clever as these fables are, they're also dismayingly facile: Rhodes debunks pieties but doesn't replace them with actual insights. Only the long final story offers provocative ideas about the true nature of love. The 34-year-old Rhodes plainly has talent to burn, but in these stories he generates more smoke than fire. Considering his ample gifts, it's a shame to discover he's taken the book's title to heart."

== Stage Adaptation ==
Three of the stories have been interlinked into a stage adaptation by Julia Hicks, also called Don't Tell Me the Truth About Love, performed at the Bedlam Theatre in February 2008.
