= This Is Life =

2012 novel by Dan Rhodes

- First edition
- Author: Dan Rhodes
- Cover artist: Dermot Flynn
- Language: English
- Publisher: Canongate
- Publication date: Mar 2012
- Publication place: United Kingdom
- Media type: Print
- Pages: 423
- ISBN: 0-85786-245-6

This Is Life is a 2012 novel by British author Dan Rhodes.

== Plot introduction ==
Set in contemporary Paris it tells the story of several interlinked characters, amongst them are:-

Aurélie Renard - studying art at a Paris college, she throws a small stone to initiate her art project, planning to follow whoever it hits over the course of a week and make them the subject of a series of artworks. The stone hits a small baby on the forehead; the mother threatens to call the police but on hearing of Aurélie's project agrees to let her look after the baby, named Herbert, and have him returned to her a week later...

Sylvie Dupont - Aurélie's best friend, she is looking for a husband; to aid her in her task she has taken a different job each day in order to meet as many as possible having read that the most common way to meet a life partner is in the workplace. One such job is driving tourists around Paris in a 2CV.

Lucien - like Sylvie, he is also looking for a life partner; he only has eyes for Japanese girls though and hence has learnt the language and is acting as a translator for Japanese tourists.

The Akiyamas are a Japanese couple on holiday in Paris leaving their grown up son and daughter, Toshiro and Akiko home in Japan. They have booked an afternoon with Sylvie in the 2CV with their translator Lucien.

'Le Machine' is a performance artist who is preparing for the latest leg of a world tour of his show Life in which he lives day and night naked on stage for 12 weeks in front of an audience, collecting all the bodily effluent produced.

The story follows these and other associated characters over the course of a week...

== Reception ==
Reviews were mixed though generally positive :

- Edward Docx writing in The Observer called the novel to be "wholly implausible" with "frustratingly far-fetched" scenarios. Despite this he found it to be "a charming and warm-hearted book, full of dark paradoxes and witty ideas" with a "delightful cast of characters".
- Toby Clements in The Daily Telegraph writes "a comic confection perfectly suited to lulling even the most cynical into willingly suspending disbelief, and you soon find yourself overlooking the high tally of improbabilities and coincidences. You even start relishing the fact that it is similar in tone to Amélie, and just like that film it is irresistible: quality froth infused with restrained comic irony, some very nice touches of dark humour and one or two genuinely arresting moments"
- Daneet Steffens in The Independent concludes "This is Life is a true mélange of talk, action, lust and performance art that moves at a fairly furious, if scatty, pace. A subplot involving a gun doesn't come together quite as nicely as other bits do, but the novel has many charms – even if you've got to tolerate a bit of lunacy in order to keep up".
- Rosemary Goring of The Herald is less enamoured: "At 400-plus pages, this is the longest and, to my mind, least engaging of Rhodes's novels"..."This Is Life is anything but; the artifices of Rhodes's trade could scarcely be more pronounced, from crazy coincidences, narrow escapes and happy endings, to characters so much larger than life they make the Eiffel Tower look like a matchstick. All of these would be fine, were it not for the flatness of the writing. Every so often Rhodes's pin-sharp prose kicks in, and the result never fails to amuse. But for long stretches he flirts perilously with the inane and the obvious"... "At its heart, as with much of Rhodes's work, there is a story that matters, a kernel of true substance. It is this, in the shape of Le Machine, which transforms This Is Life from just a clever fictional circus and slapstick satire, into something more affecting and significant".
