= Gold (Rhodes novel) =

2007 novel by Dan Rhodes

- First edition
- Author: Dan Rhodes
- Cover artist: XIAO at www.nthcreative.co.uk
- Language: English
- Publisher: Canongate
- Publication date: 2007
- Publication place: United Kingdom
- Media type: Print & eBook
- Pages: 198
- ISBN: 1-84195-953-7

Gold is a novel by British author Dan Rhodes published in September 2007 by Canongate. It won the inaugural Clare Maclean Prize for Scottish Fiction and has since been published in five other languages: Spanish, Danish, Finnish, Dutch, Norwegian. It was also one of the 'best books of 2007' according to critics at The Independent. It was controversially shortlisted as a contender for the Greatest Welsh novel, even though the writer is English and the novel had previously won the Clare Mclean Prize for Scottish fiction.

== Plot introduction ==
Set in a coastal village in Pembrokeshire, the novel concerns Miyuki Woodward, a young Welsh-Japanese woman who spends a month every winter staying in a nearby cottage, away from her female partner Grindl (with whom she runs a decorating business), as a lesson in not taking each other for granted. Her appearance in the local pub is welcomed by all, but this year she becomes more involved in the local community than usual; the gold in the title referring to her impulsive gold spray-painting of a prominent boulder on a nearby beach, which soon attracts the attention of the local police.
