= Dan Rhodes =

English writer

- Born: 1972 (age 53–54)
- Education: MA in creative writing
- Alma mater: University of Glamorgan (now the University of South Wales)
- Notable work: Timoleon Vieta Come Home (2003)
- Website: danrhodes.co.uk

Dan Rhodes (born 1972) is an English writer known for the novel Timoleon Vieta Come Home (2003), a subversion of the popular Lassie Come Home movie. He is also the author of Anthropology (2000), a collection of 101 stories, each consisting of exactly 101 words. In 2010 he was awarded the E. M. Forster Award.

== Biography ==
Rhodes grew up in Devon, and graduated in humanities from the University of Glamorgan (now the University of South Wales) in 1994, returning in 1997 to complete an MA in Creative Writing. Don't Tell Me the Truth About Love was written at this time. He has held a variety of jobs, including stockroom assistant for Waterstones, barman in his parents' pub, and a teacher in Ho Chi Minh City. He has also worked on a fruit and vegetable farm and is still employed as a postman.

Following the publication of his second book, Rhodes's frustration with the publishing industry led him to announce his retirement from writing, though he later said, "I haven't really given up. I'm certainly not making any more grand pronouncements. I was just sick of the business and wanted out. Not just the publishers; everyone around me."

Rhodes was included on Granta's Best of Young British Novelists list in 2003, to his own bemusement and frustration, partly because of Granta's selection methods ("It's one thing to judge a writer by stuff they've written, but to judge them on stuff they're going to write is lunacy") but also because some of the others on the list failed to respond to his request to sign a joint statement protesting the Iraq War.

In 2014, Rhodes self-published the novel When the Professor Got Stuck in the Snow, a "rural farce" about a visit to an obscure English village by a fictional Richard Dawkins, stating that he wanted to get the book out faster than conventional publishing allowed.

In 2021, Lightning Books published his novel Sour Grapes, a satire on the literary world set at a rural book festival.

Rhodes is married with two children.

== Bibliography ==
=== Collections ===
- Anthropology: And a Hundred Other Stories (2000) ISBN 9781841956145
- Don't Tell Me the Truth About Love (2001) ISBN 9781841956138
- Marry Me (2013) ISBN 9780857868497

=== Novels ===
- Timoleon Vieta Come Home (2003) ISBN 9781841954813
- The Little White Car (under the pen name Danuta de Rhodes) (2004) ISBN 9781841955285
- Gold (2007) ISBN 9781841959535
- Little Hands Clapping (2010) ISBN 9781847675293
- This Is Life (2012) ISBN 9780857862457
- When the Professor Got Stuck in the Snow (2014, self-published limited edition; 2015 formal publication by Aardvark Bureau) ISBN 9781910709016
- Sour Grapes (2021) ISBN 9781785632921
