= Saatchi (name) =

Saatchi (Persian: ساعتچی; Arabicized form: ساعتجي; Turkish: saatçi) is a Turkish surname and word. The word "saatchi" (sā'ātchi), which means "watchmaker", originates from Ottoman Turkish (Modern Turkish: "saatçi"), derived from "saat" ("watch", from Arabic "ساعة") with the suffix "-çi". The Albanian surname Sahatçiu is also derived from the Turkish word "saatçi" as a result of the Ottoman rule in Albania.

== Surnames ==
Notable people with the name include:

=== Saatchi ===
- Charles Saatchi (born 1943), founder and owner of the Saatchi Gallery in London
- Doris Lockhart Saatchi (1937–2025), American art collector
- Edward Saatchi (born 1985), British businessman
- Maurice Saatchi, Baron Saatchi (born 1946), ex-chairman of the British Conservative Party
- Nathan Saatchi (1907–2000), Iraqi-born British businessman

=== Sahatçiu ===
- Besim Sahatçiu (1935–2005), Kosovo Albanian film director
- Rita Sahatçiu Ora (born 1990), British singer

=== Saatçi ===
- Ercan Saatçi (born 1968), Turkish musician and record producer
- Nazan Saatci (born 1958), Turkish actress
- Serdar Saatçı (born 2003), Turkish footballer
