= Vic Hislop =

Australian shark hunter (born 1947)

Vic Hislop (born 1 July 1947, in Stanthorpe, Queensland, Australia) is a former shark hunter.

Vic Hislop has dedicated most of his life to capturing and killing sharks. His activities have long been the subject of controversy. In the face of the increasing acceptance that sharks are an essential part of the ocean ecology, Hislop has claimed that they are God's mistake, and feels that his mission is to correct that mistake by killing them.

"At least a hundred swimmers disappear every year here and their bodies are never found. Many have been eaten. I’ve often caught sharks and removed human hands and feet from their stomachs. I even found a human foot still in its sandal."

He was responsible for catching 12 sharks for the British contemporary artist, Damien Hirst, which Hirst then incorporated into works including The Physical Impossibility of Death in the Mind of Someone Living, which was sold in 2004 for an estimated $8 million.

In 2016, Hislop closed his "Shark Show" in Hervey Bay, Queensland, after 30 years, citing personal reasons.
