= Saatchi =

Saatchi may refer to:

- Saatchi (name), a Turkish surname (includes a list of people with the name)
- Saatchi Gallery, contemporary art gallery
- Saatchi & Saatchi, advertising agency
- M&C Saatchi, advertising agency
- Saatchi (film), a 1983 Tamil film directed by S. A. Chandrasekhar
