= Rosie (shark) =

Preserved individual great white shark

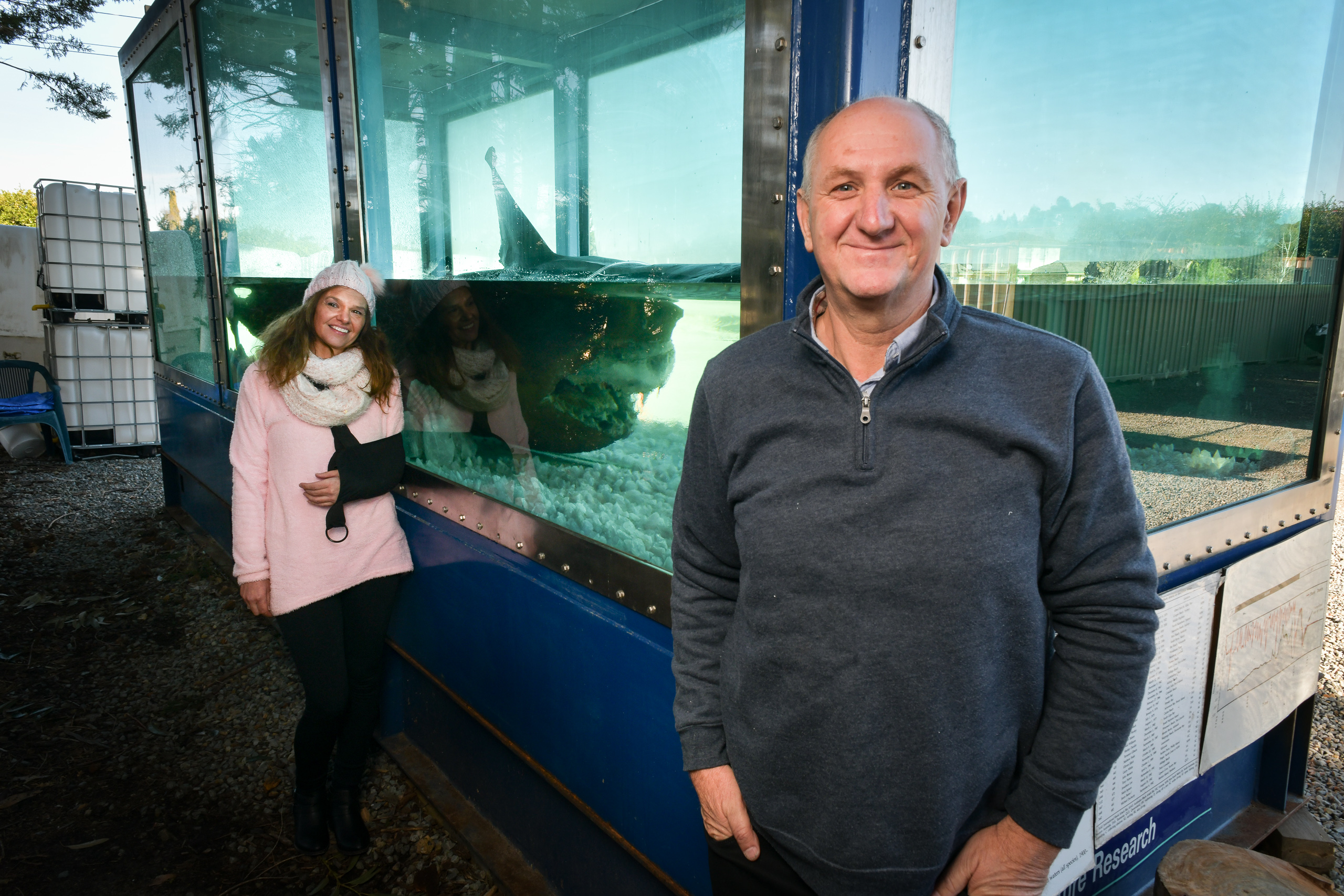
- Tom Kapitany and Sharon Williamson standing with Rosie at the Crystal World Exhibition Centre
- Species: Great White Shark
- Sex: Female
- Died: 1997; South Australia
- Cause of death: Bycatch
- Known for: Novelty attraction

Rosie is a preserved great white shark located at Crystal World Exhibition Centre in Devon Meadows, Australia. She was originally preserved in a glass tank of formaldehyde on display at Wildlife Wonderland in Bass, Victoria which closed in 2012 due to animal welfare concerns and operating without appropriate licenses. She was an urban exploration destination at the abandoned park until being recovered and transferred to the Crystal World Exhibition Centre, where she is undergoing restoration.

== History ==
The great white shark was killed after being caught in fishing nets on the coast of South Australia in 1997. Seal Rocks Sea Life Centre initially showed interest in purchasing the shark from the Lukin family, but later decided against the purchase. Wildlife Wonderland purchased her instead.

As the shark was being transported to Wildlife Wonderland in Victoria in a refrigerated truck, it was impounded by the Government of South Australia because a woman had been reported missing, requiring a necropsy of the shark at the South Australian Museum.

Following the necropsy, the shark was preserved in a formaldehyde solution in a custom-built tank.

Founder of Wildlife Wonderland, John Matthews recalled the operation of ownership: "It was a huge logistical operation, working with Melbourne Museum, and all up cost us about $500,000."

"We had to build a purpose-built room and the roof had to be removed and the shark craned in and put into a new, sealed tank."

Due to the toxicity of Rosie's tank room from the harmful chemicals, if Matthews had not been wearing a hazmat suit, he would only have been able to spend around a minute in the room. Had he not followed those precautions, he would have experienced irritation in the eyes, nose and throat, after a long period of time he would likely have breathing problems.

In 2012, Wildlife Wonderland was reported to have been operating its business without appropriate licenses, forcing it to cease operations and surrender all live animals to RSPCA Australia and the Department of Sustainability and Environment Victoria.

== Vandalism ==
In November 2018, a video released on YouTube by urban explorer Luke McPherson showed inside the decaying wildlife park and later stumbling upon the shark tank. Months after, the YouTube video gained millions of views, prompting a rise in trespassing into the property to view the shark, with vandals also damaging and graffitiing the tank and its surroundings. Objects such as chairs were also thrown into the tank. Local police issued public warnings of the dangers of visiting the shark, following the damage done to the shark's vitrine which caused carcinogenic formaldehyde vapours to leak from the tank.

== Restoration ==
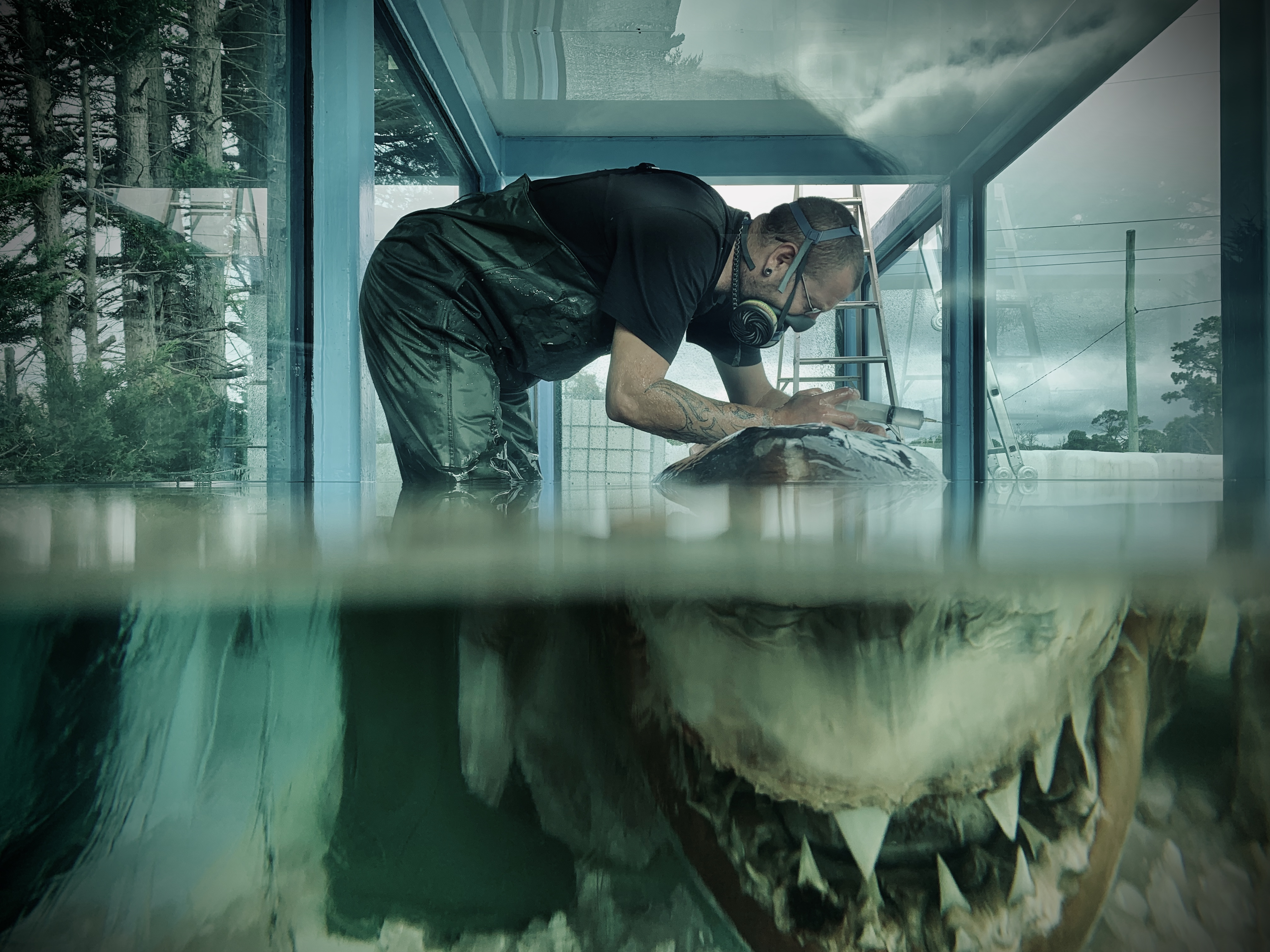
Shane McAlister injecting glycerol into Rosie the Shark at Crystal World Exhibition Centre to stop further degradation of the shark's exposed fins.

Tom Kapitany directed the restoration efforts of Rosie at the Crystal World Exhibition Centre located at 13 Olive Road, Devon Meadows, Victoria, Australia. Staff of the exhibition centre have flushed the formaldehyde out of the enclosure to replace it with glycerol as a safer alternative for the preservative solution.

Delays were encountered along the restoration process due to the cost involved in filling the tank with glycerol, Tom Kapitany noted as saying "Ultimately we'll need 19,500 litres, which will cost us $60,000 AUD".

A documentary is being filmed by Flying Fox Productions that follows the story of Rosie the Shark's history, destruction, rescue, and restoration.

Initially upon taking ownership of the shark, Kapitany sought advice from a shark and taxidermy expert, stating "At the beginning, we consulted a shark and taxidermy expert about the best way to preserve her and there was no easy way to do it. Everything had a compromise and a problem". He added, upon advice from glass experts regarding the smashed glass panels around the enclosure, "There are four layers of glass and just one layer is broken, so we’re keeping it because it’s all part of the story".

The shark has since been freely on display at Crystal World Exhibition Centre while restoration efforts continue, with constant monitoring and injections of glycerol into the exposed parts of the shark until the tank is finally completely filled with the preservative.

== See also ==
- The Physical Impossibility of Death in the Mind of Someone Living
