= National Dinosaur Museum =

Museum in Canberra, Australia

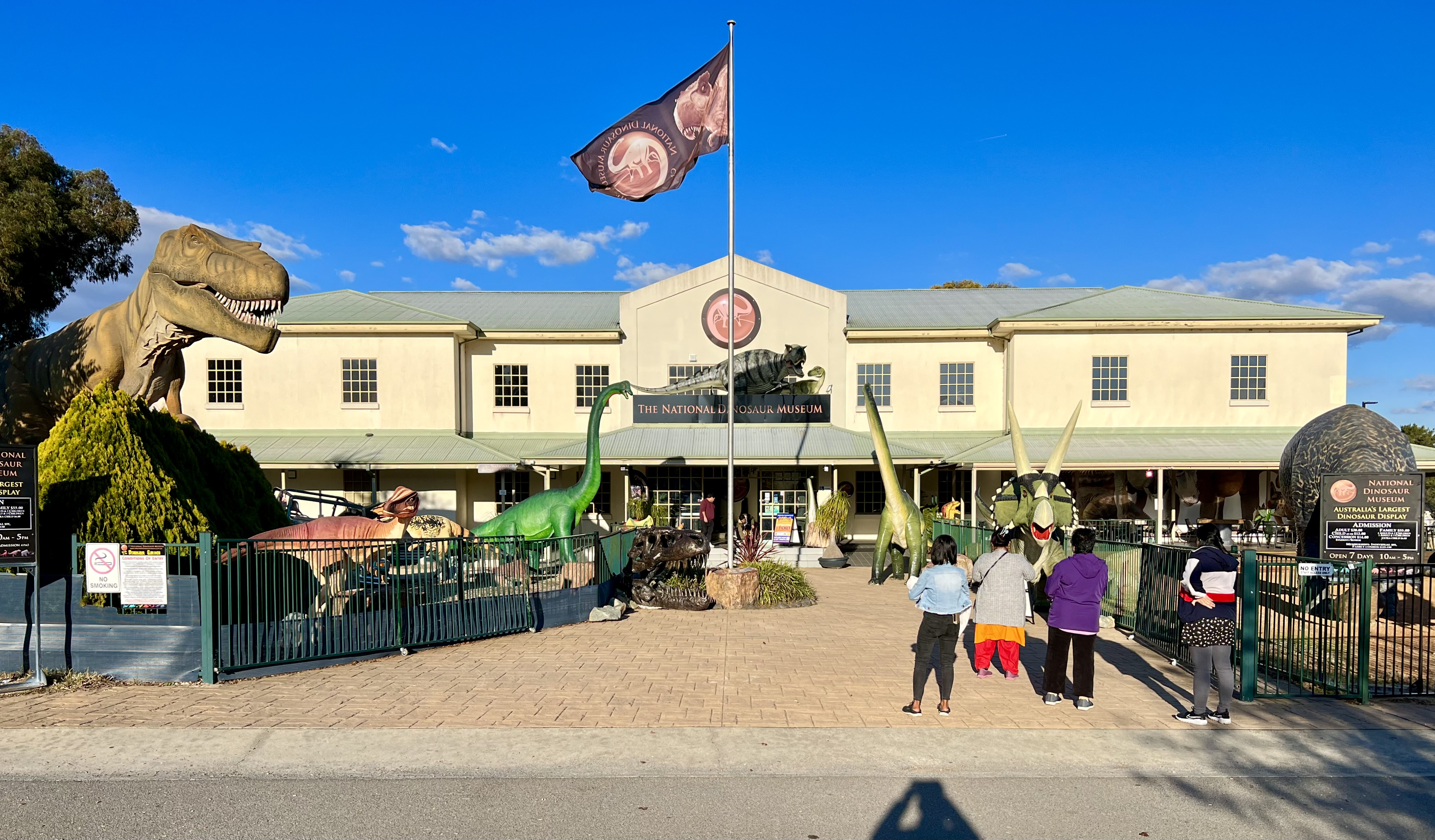
- Established: 1993
- Location: 6 Gold Creek Road, Nicholls, Australian Capital Territory, Australia
- Coordinates: 35.194305°S 149.088153°E
- Website: nationaldinosaurmuseum.com.au

National Dinosaur Museum, located in Gold Creek Village, Nicholls, Canberra, is Australia's largest permanent display of prehistoric specimens. Established in 1993, the museum has grown into one of Canberra's premier tourist attractions.

The museum's exhibition takes visitors on a journey through the evolution of life, with a particular focus on dinosaurs. It features indoor and outdoor exhibits with life-size replica dinosaur models, real and replica skeletons, bones, fossils, crystals, meteorites and more. The museum is believed to house the biggest fossil display in the southern hemisphere. The museum provides an engaging and educational experience for visitors of all ages, including a gift shop and a Dinosaur garden.

With an annual patronage of 100,000 visitors, the museum is one of the most popular attractions in the Australian Capital Territory. The museum is based around the school curriculum and caters for guided tours for school groups, focusing on an interactive "touch and feel" experience. National Dinosaur Museum additionally host birthday parties, dances with dinosaurs, events for young children, private parties, corporate functions and dinosaur sleep overs during school holiday periods. Events are regularly posted to the Museum Facebook page.

The National Dinosaur Museum offers an educational onsite experience for children, along with online resources such as the Kids Dino News Blog for young paleontologists.

In addition to being an educational tourist attraction, National Dinosaur Museum is a research institution with numerous scientific papers published.

== History ==
Established in 1993, the museum has been steadily improved and updated since its conception. It offers earth science dinosaur oriented displays that keep up with most recent discoveries in the geological sciences.

In September 2011, Jeno Kapitany, Martin Rowe, Chris Michael, and Kathleen Michael were appointed as directors including local and international scientist and geologist Tom Kapitany.

Major upgrades have taken place in April and May 2012 with the addition of twelve animatronic dinosaurs as well as an extensive collection of life size models displayed both within and outside the museum.

New displays of Australian dinosaurs, earth sciences including meteorites, fluorescent mineral displays were added over 2012 and 2013.

In 2017, Director Tom Kapitany attended BRISMIS, an international Museum Conference based on museums along the Silk Road. The Geological Museum of China and the National Dinosaur Museum begin a new joint cooperation to share ideas and science.

In 2017, 3 replica Dinosaurs were beheaded at National Dinosaur Museum, vandals scaled a fence and used a hacksaw or angle grinder to remove the dinosaur heads.

In April 2023, National Dinosaur Museum turned 30 years old. Locals and visitors were invited to join the celebrations.

== Awards ==
The National Dinosaur Museum won the Tourist Attractions category at the Canberra Region Tourism Awards in 2023 and 2024.

The National Dinosaur Museum was a finalist for the Australian Tourism Awards in 2023 and 2024. This recognition highlights their excellence in providing a top-notch visitor experience and contributing to the tourism industry in Australia.

In December 2023, Director Tom Kapitany and the National Dinosaur Museum were awarded tokens of appreciation for outstanding contributions to the International Symposium on the Development of Natural Science Museums under the Belt and Road Initiative (BRISMIS).

== Gallery ==
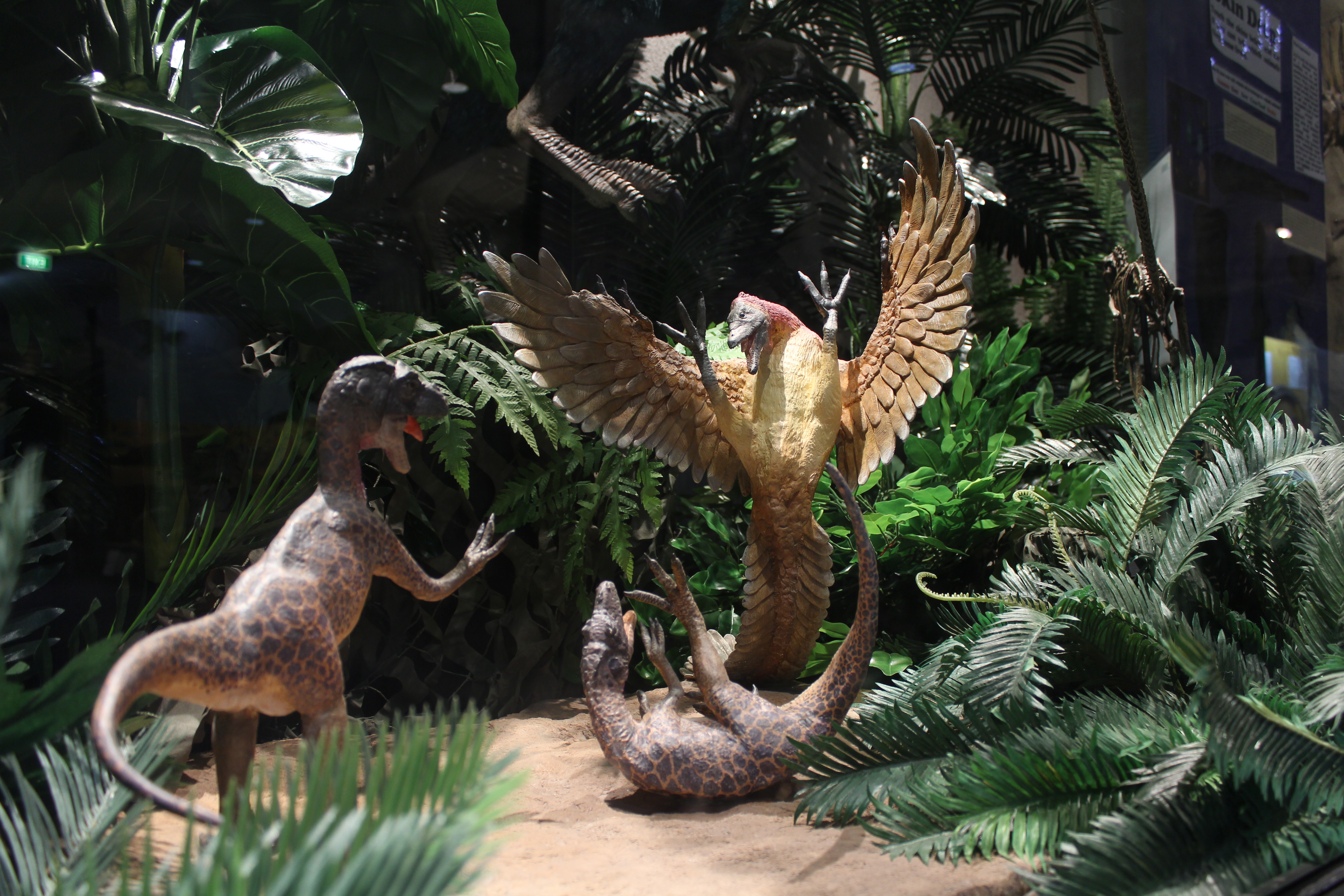
Exhibit - Archaeopteryx Diorama

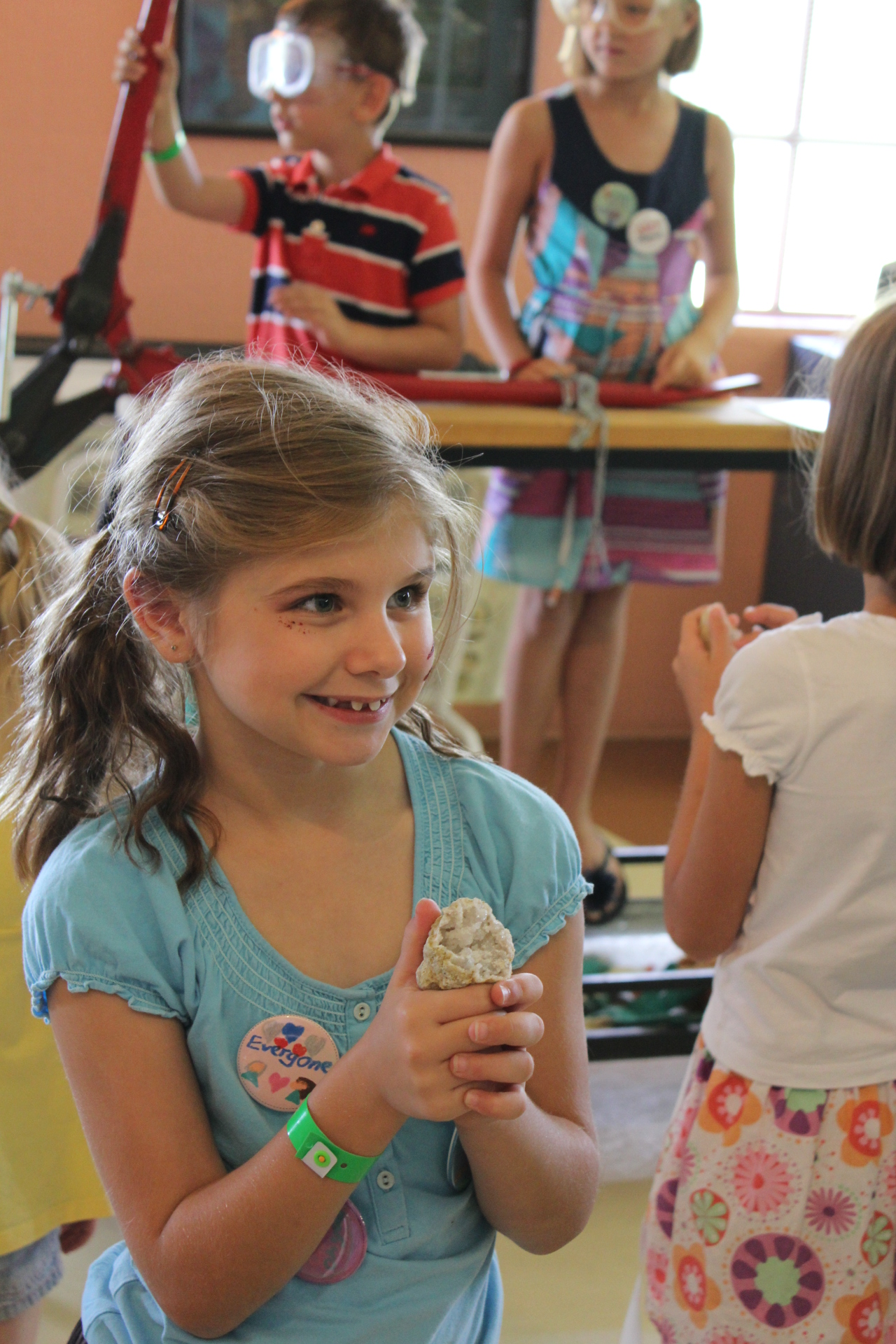
Geode Cracking

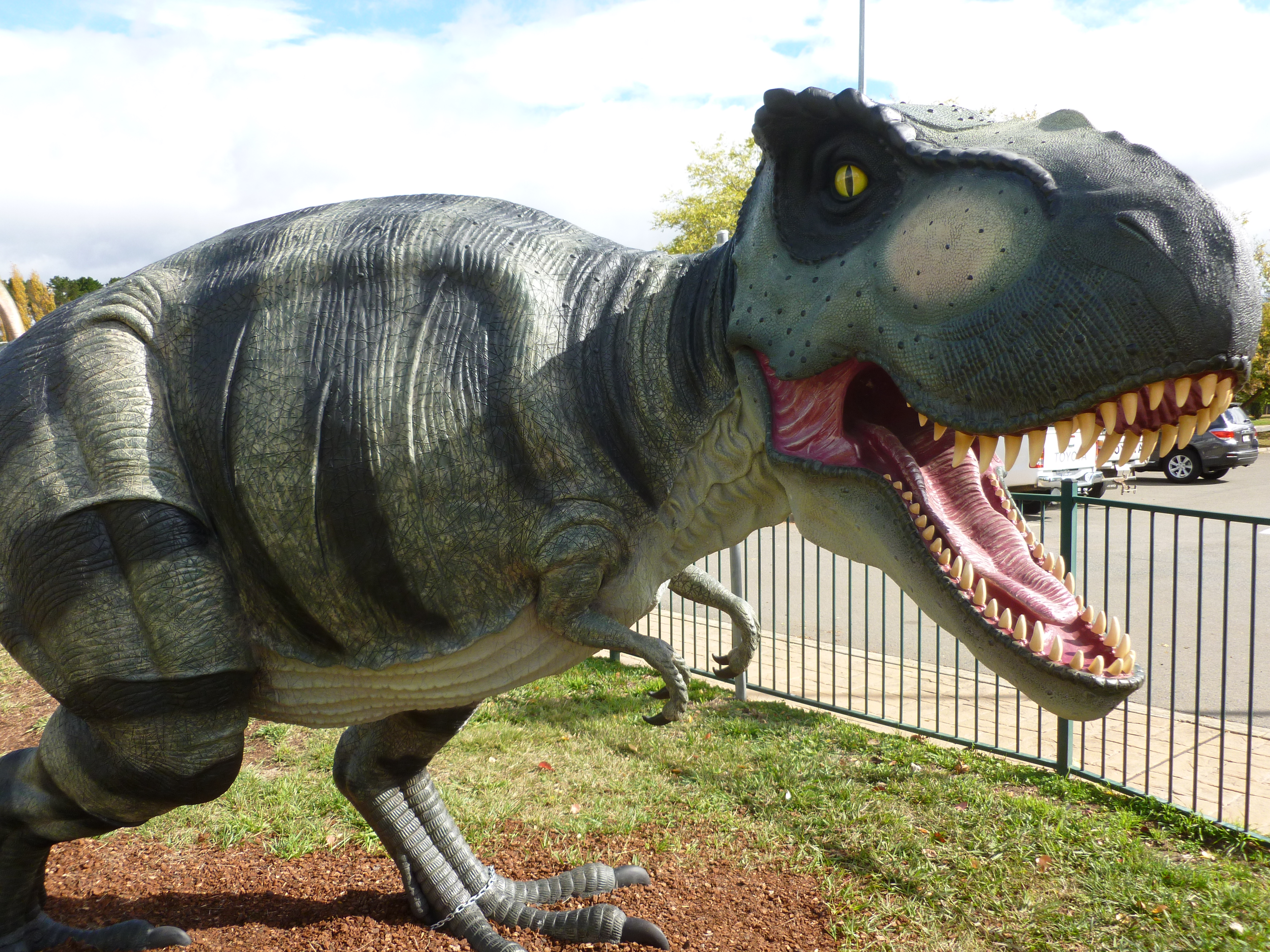
Dinosaur Garden

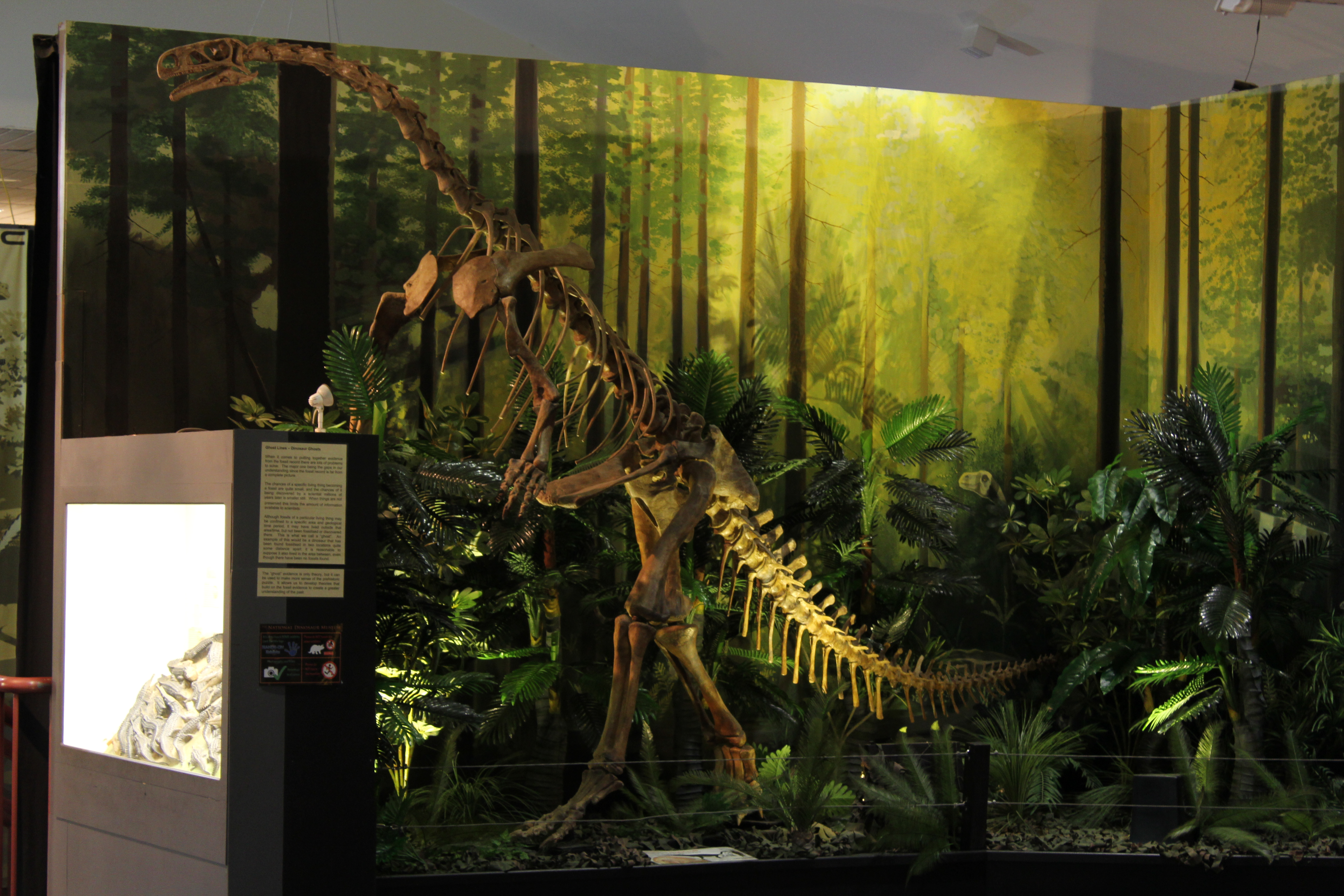
Exhibit - Plateosaurus
