= The Physical Impossibility of Death in the Mind of Someone Living =

Artwork by Damien Hirst

- Artist: Damien Hirst
- Year: 1991
- Type: Tiger shark, glass, steel, 5% formaldehyde solution
- Medium: Conceptual Installation
- Movement: Anti-Stuckism; Postmodernism
- Subject: Life, apparent death
- Dimensions: 213 cm × 518 cm × 213 cm (84 in × 204 in × 84 in)

The Physical Impossibility of Death in the Mind of Someone Living is an artwork created in 1991 by Damien Hirst, an English artist and a leading member of the "Young British Artists" (or YBA, also known as "Britart"). It consists of a preserved tiger shark submerged in formalin in a glass-panel display case.

It was originally commissioned in 1991 by Charles Saatchi, who sold it in 2004 to Steven A. Cohen for an undisclosed amount, widely reported to have been at least $8 million. However, the title of Don Thompson's book, The $12 Million Stuffed Shark: The Curious Economics of Contemporary Art, suggests a higher figure.

Owing to deterioration of the original 14-foot (4.3 m) tiger shark, it was replaced with a new specimen in 2006. It was on loan to the Metropolitan Museum of Art in New York City from 2007 to 2010.

It is considered an iconic work of British art in the 1990s, and has become a symbol of Britart worldwide.

== Background and concept ==
The work was funded by the businessman Charles Saatchi, who in 1991 had offered to pay for whatever artwork Hirst wanted to create. The shark cost Hirst £6,000 and the total cost of the work was £50,000. Hirst asked Saatchi's ex-wife, art collector Doris Lockhart, for a loan to cover the cost of shipping the shark from Australia, but she gave him the money outright. In return, Hirst invited Lockhart to choose anything she liked from his studio, and she selected a piece called The Only Way Is Up. The shark was caught off Hervey Bay in Queensland, Australia, by a fisherman commissioned to do so. Hirst wanted something "big enough to eat you".

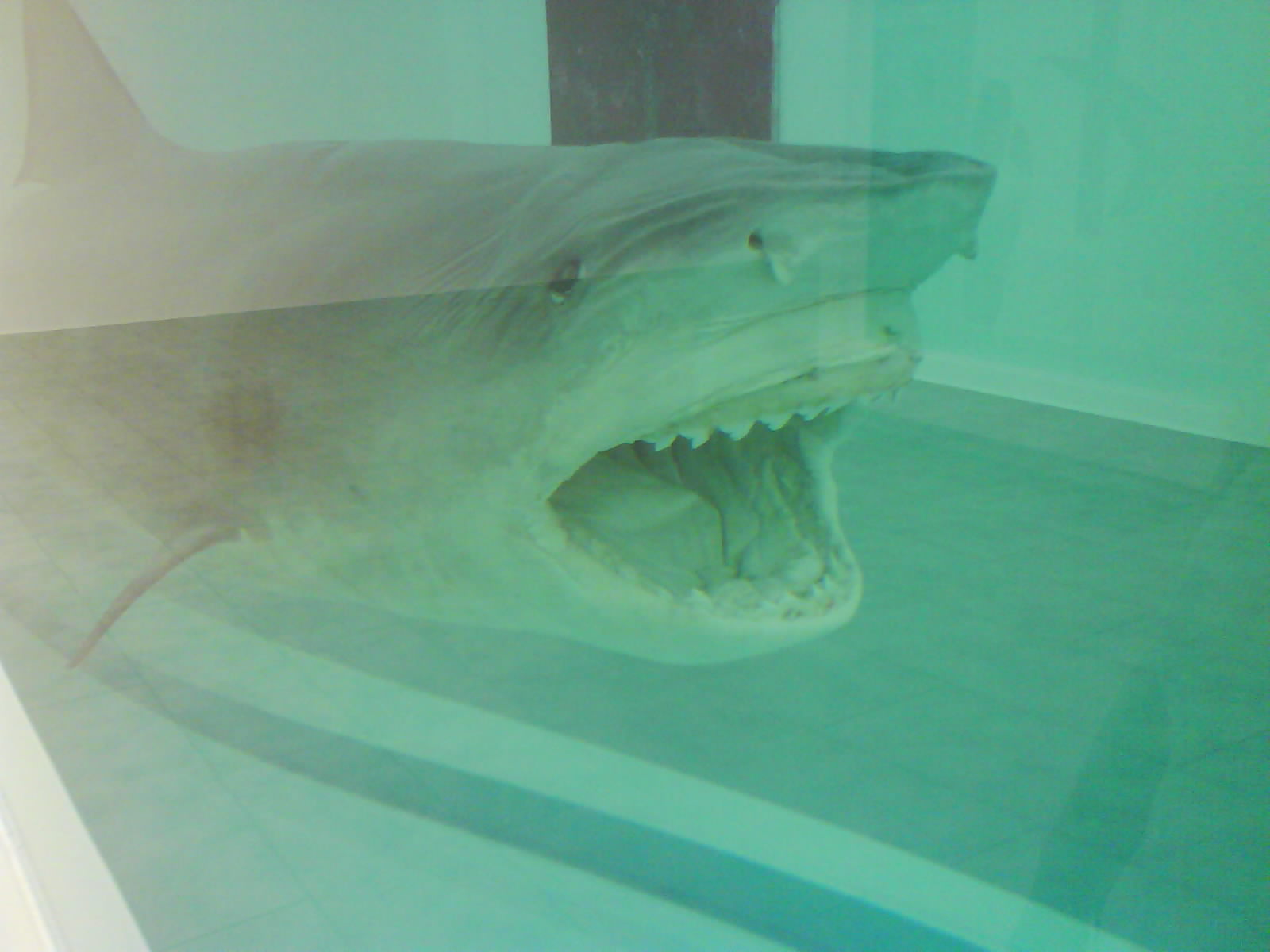
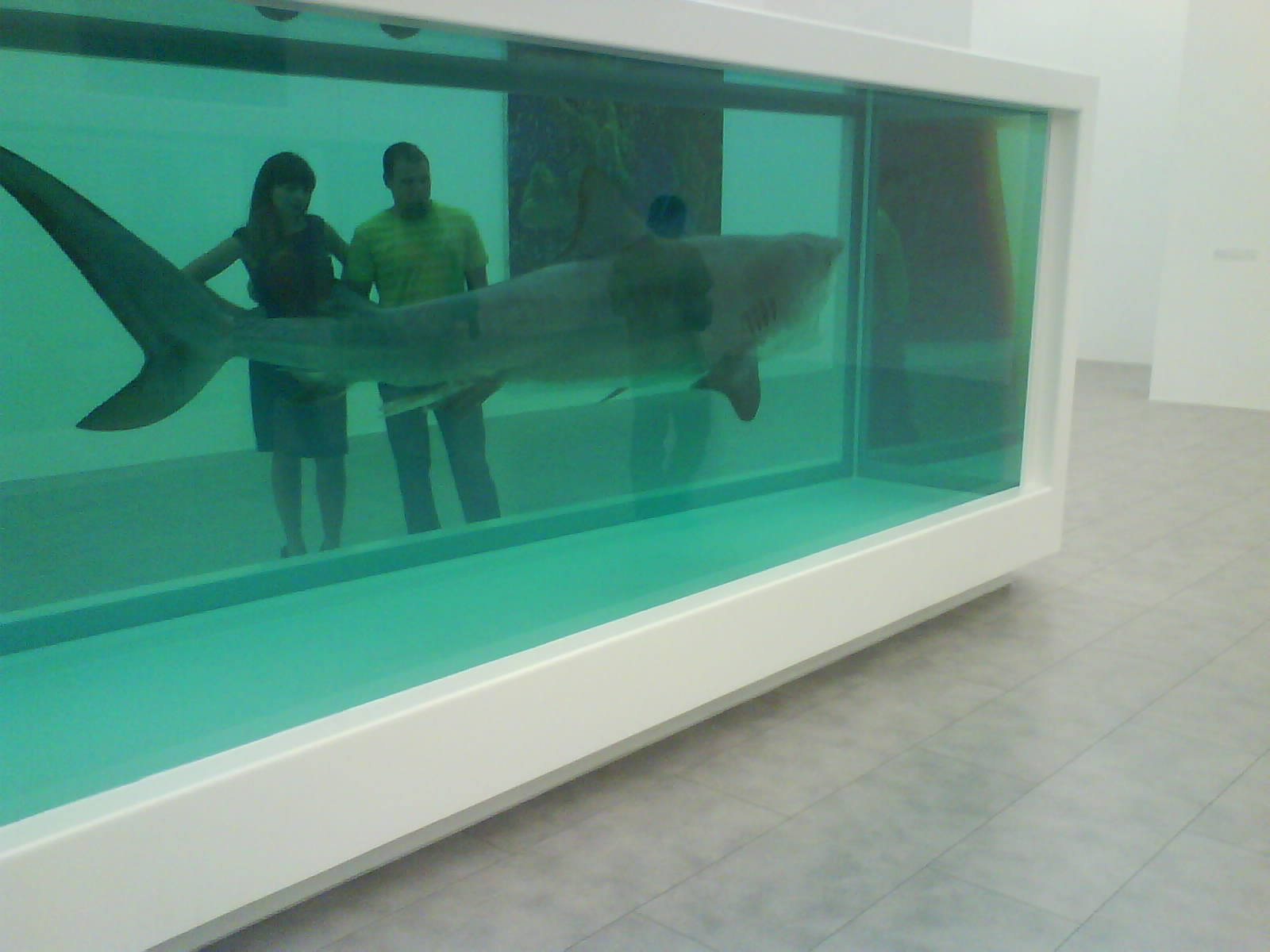
Death Denied (2008) part of a later artwork, exhibited in Kyiv

The Physical Impossibility of Death in the Mind of Someone Living was first exhibited in 1992 in the first of a series of Young British Artists shows at the Saatchi Gallery, then at its premises in St John's Wood, north London. The British tabloid newspaper The Sun ran a story titled "£50,000 for fish without chips." The show also included Hirst's artwork A Thousand Years. He was then nominated for the Turner Prize, but it was awarded to Grenville Davey. Saatchi sold the work in 2004 to Steven A. Cohen for an estimated $8 million.

Its technical specifications are: "Tiger shark, glass, steel, 5% formaldehyde solution, 213 × 518 × 213 cm."

The New York Times in 2007 gave the following description of the artwork:

Mr. Hirst often aims to fry the mind (and misses more than he hits), but he does so by setting up direct, often visceral experiences, of which the shark remains the most outstanding.

In keeping with the piece's title, the shark is simultaneously life and death incarnate in a way you don't quite grasp until you see it, suspended and silent, in its tank. It gives the innately demonic urge to live a demonic, deathlike form.

== Decay and replacement ==
Because the shark was initially preserved poorly, it began to deteriorate, and the liquid grew murky. Hirst attributed some of the decay to the fact that the Saatchi Gallery had added bleach to the fluid. In 1993, the gallery skinned the shark and stretched its skin over a fiberglass mould, thus transforming the shark from a chemically preserved intact carcass to a taxidermy mount displayed in fluid. Hirst commented, "It didn't look as frightening ... You could tell it wasn't real. It had no weight."

When Hirst learned of Saatchi's impending sale of the work to Cohen, he offered to replace the shark, an operation which Cohen funded, calling the expense "inconsequential" (the formaldehyde process alone cost around $100,000). Another shark (a female aged about 25–30 years, equivalent to middle age) was caught off the Queensland coast and shipped to Hirst in a 2-month journey. In 2006, Oliver Crimmen, a scientist and fish curator at London's Natural History Museum, assisted with the preservation of the new specimen. This involved injecting formaldehyde into the body, as well as soaking it for two weeks in a bath of 7% formalin solution. The original 1991 vitrine was then used to house it.

Hirst acknowledged that there was a philosophical question as to whether replacing the shark meant that the result could still be considered the same artwork. He observed:

It's a big dilemma. Artists and conservators have different opinions about what's important: the original artwork or the original intention. I come from a conceptual art background, so I think it should be the intention. It's the same piece. But the jury will be out for a long time to come.

== Variants ==
Hirst has made other works subsequently which also feature a preserved shark in formaldehyde in a vitrine: The Immortal (a great white shark, 2005), Wrath of God (2005), Death Explained (the shark is split in two, lengthwise, 2007), Death Denied (2008), The Kingdom (2008) and Leviathan (a basking shark, 2010).

In September 2008, The Kingdom, a tiger shark, sold at Hirst's Sotheby's auction, Beautiful Inside My Head Forever, for £9.6 million (more than £3 million above its estimate).

Hirst has made a miniature version of The Physical Impossibility of Death in the Mind of Someone Living for the Miniature Museum in the Netherlands. In this case, he put a guppy in a box (10 × 3.5 × 5 centimetres) filled with formaldehyde.

He also presented a number of other animals preserved in formaldehyde, including: a cow and a calf (Mother and Child (Divided)), a sheep (Away from the Flock), an 18-month old calf with the disk of the Egyptian goddess Hathor between its 18-carat gold horns (The Golden Calf), and a dove in flight (The Incomplete Truth).

== Responses ==
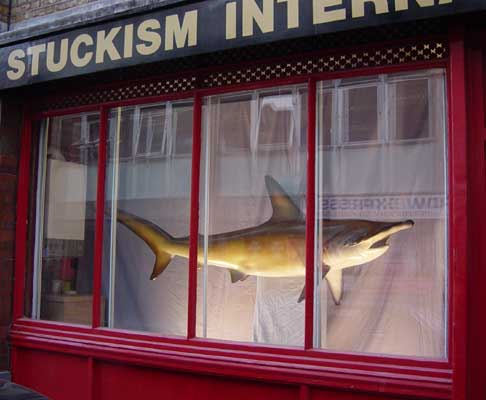
A Dead Shark Isn't Art, 2003. Stuckism International Gallery

In 2003, under the title A Dead Shark Isn't Art, the Stuckism International Gallery exhibited a shark which had first been put on public display two years before Hirst's by Eddie Saunders in his Shoreditch (London) shop, JD Electrical Supplies. The Stuckists suggested that Hirst may have got the idea for his work from Saunders' shop display.

In a speech at the Royal Academy in 2004, art critic Robert Hughes used The Physical Impossibility of Death in the Mind of Someone Living as a prime example of how the international art market at the time was a "cultural obscenity". Without naming the artwork or the artist, he stated that brush marks in the lace collar of a painting by Velázquez could be more radical than a shark "murkily disintegrating in its tank on the other side of the Thames".

Critics have also questioned the ethics of the part of Hirst's oeuvre that involves dead animals. One estimate puts the number of creatures killed for Hirst's pieces at 913,450, including individual insects.

The 2009 British-Hungarian film The Nutcracker in 3D features a scene in which a pet shark is electrocuted in a water tank, which director Andrei Konchalovsky cites as a reference to Hirst's artwork.

Hirst's response to those who said that anyone could have done this artwork was, "But you didn't, did you?"

== See also ==
- Headington Shark, a 1986 artwork in Headington, Oxford
