= School of Saatchi =

British television series

School of Saatchi is a four-part BBC Television series first broadcast in November 2009. Young artists compete against each others, showcasing their talents, for a chance to be chosen by famous art collector Charles Saatchi to showcase their work in a worldwide renowned gallery.

The winner of the competition was Eugenie Scrase.
