= Medical Innovation Bill =

The Medical Innovation Bill (informally called the Saatchi Bill) was a private members' bill sponsored by Maurice Saatchi which was considered by the Parliament of the United Kingdom. If passed into law the bill would have permitted doctors to use unconventional medical treatments in certain circumstances.

The bill's proposals were criticised by medical bodies, and it failed to progress through the House of Commons after the Liberal Democrats declined to support it.

== Background ==
Following the death of his wife Josephine Hart to ovarian cancer, Maurice Saatchi campaigned for a change to the UK law which he believed held doctors back from recommending innovative treatments out of fear of litigation. Saatchi said that he believed that health provision in the UK was "innovation averse" and that the current standard treatment offered to people with cancer was "degrading, medieval and ineffective" leading "only to death".

Saatchi's Medical Innovation Bill proposed that doctors be permitted to use non-standard treatments for any medical condition. The bill was formally introduced in 2013 and was co-adopted by the government in its passage through parliament.

== Response ==
The proposed legislation enjoyed some popular support and favourable press coverage, but drew a critical response from some medical and legal bodies, patient groups and charities.

An editorial in The Lancet Oncology said that Saatchi was promoting "precisely the type of emotional response that evidence-based practice seeks to avoid", that the current UK law already provided for medical innovation, and that the bill's provisions threatened to undermine the hippocratic oath.

Cancer Research UK has said there is "no pressing need" for new legislation.

In November 2014 more than 100 medical professionals signed a letter to The Times saying that the existing law did not impede innovation as has been claimed, and that the proposed new legislation could have the unintended consequence of weakening the evidence base for research by leading to an accumulation of merely anecdotal evidence.

Some doctors, patients and charities had looked favourably on the Bill. In June 2014 a number of doctors and patients wrote a letter to the Daily Telegraph in support of the bill.
