= Tom Kapitany =

Australian botanist and geologist

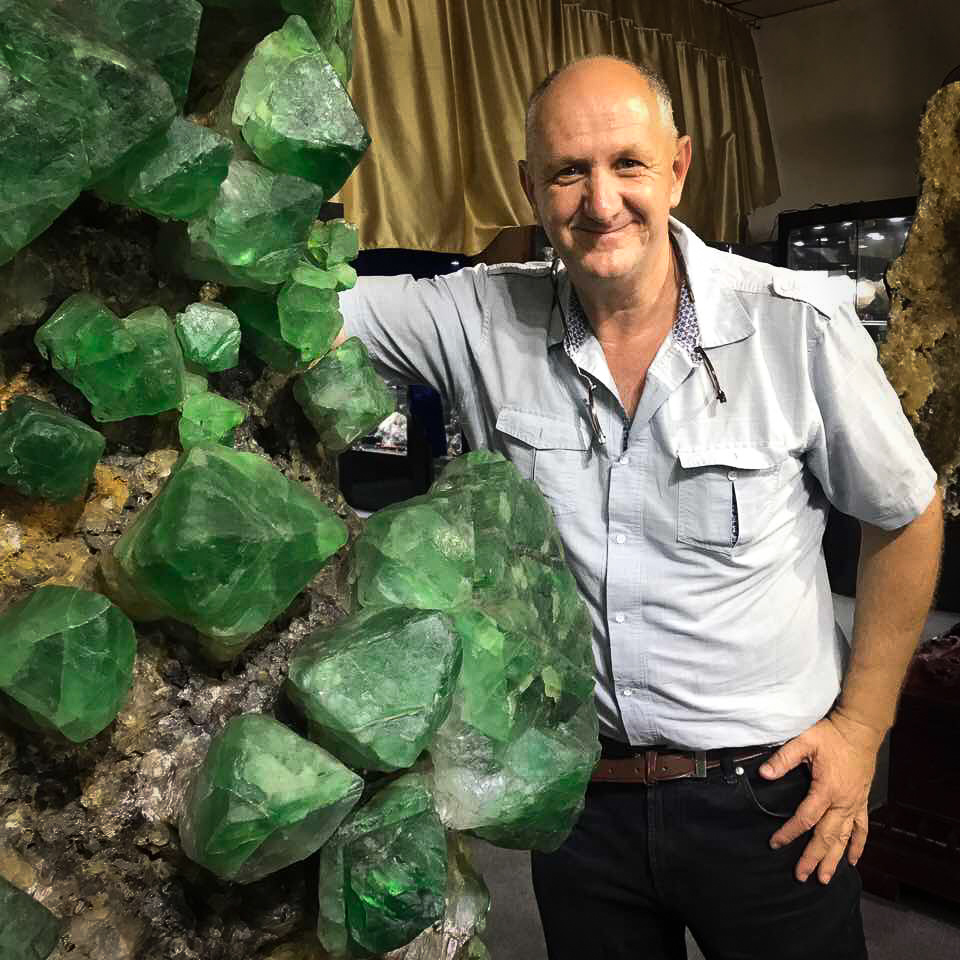
- Tom Kapitany standing next to a large fluorite octahedron specimen on matrix from inner Mongolia.
- Born: Tamas Kapitany; 15 December 1960 (age 65); Melbourne, Victoria, Australia
- Education: University of Melbourne (BSc)
- Occupations: Geologist, teacher, botanist, entrepreneur, consultant, curator
- Website: tomkapitany.com crystalworldaustralia.com

Tom Kapitany (born 15 December 1960) is an Australian botanist, geologist, international consultant, dealer, geological specimen valuer, collector and lecturer in geosciences, and entrepreneur. Kapitany is the director of Crystal World Exhibition Centre in Victoria, Australia, National Dinosaur Museum in Canberra, Australia, Collectors Corner Garden World in Braeside, Victoria, Australia, Australian Mineral Mines Pty. Ltd. and National History Museum Pty Ltd. He is an international consultant in geosciences, as well as a professional paleontologist.

Kapitany is known for raising awareness on the importance of collecting and fossicking minerals and fossils; to educate people and children on fossils and rocks of biological origin. However, as Australia's largest commercial dealer of minerals and fossils, he is a controversial figure owing to revelations of his involvement with international fossil smuggling.

== Career ==
=== Crystal World ===
Tom Kapitany started Crystal World Exhibition Centre in 1999 following his involvement with the family business' retail nursery Collectors Corner. Kapitany would frequently travel the world to source natural history specimens.Through Crystal World, Kapitany has hosted fundraising activities to help the Australian Animal Rescue charity.

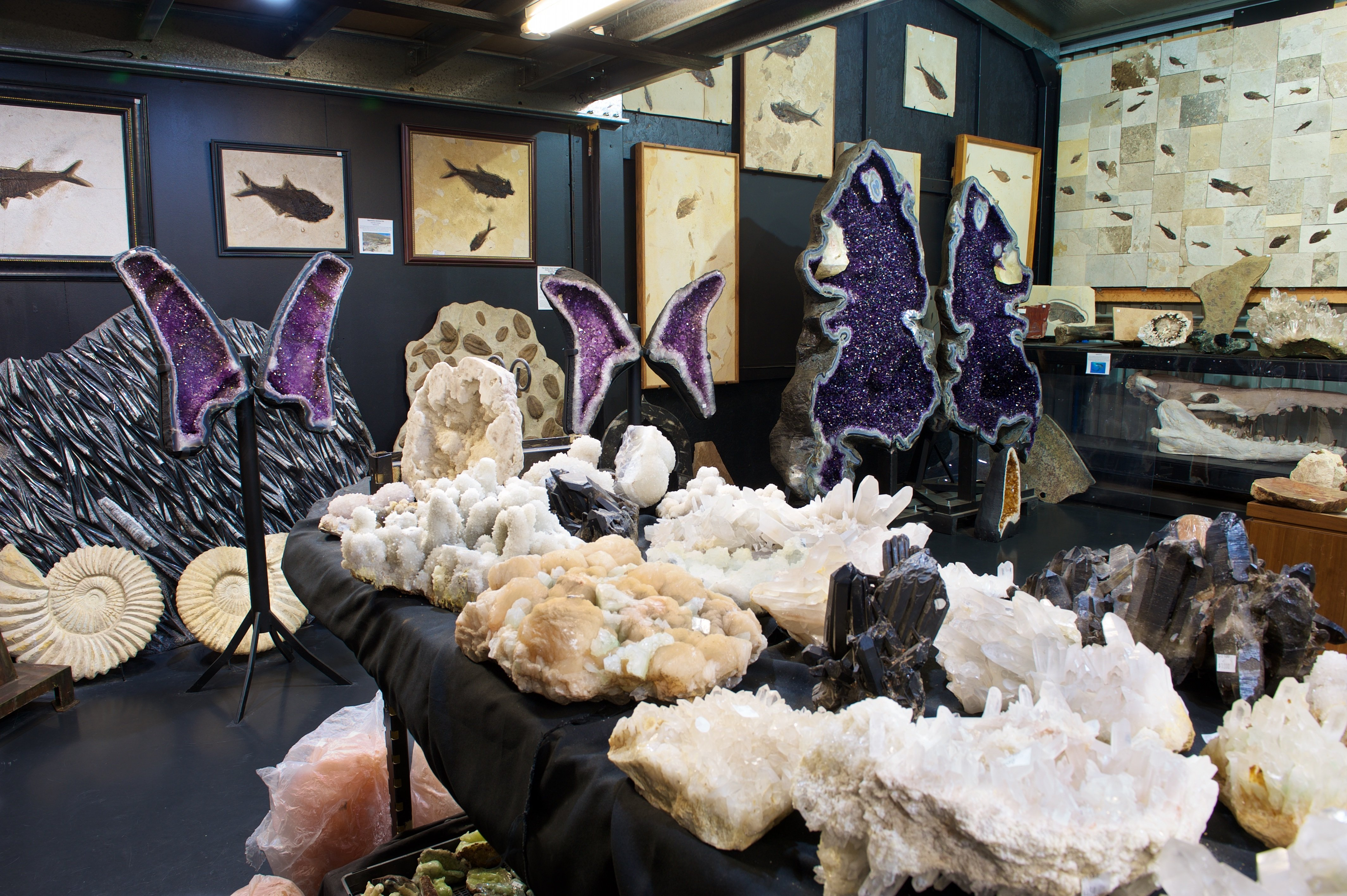
Crystal World & Prehistoric Journeys exhibition centre.

In February 2019, Kapitany and Australian Animal Rescue rescued Rosie the Shark, a preserved great white shark facing vandalism at the abandoned wildlife park Wildlife Wonderland and was rehoused at Crystal World in Devon Meadows. The shark was originally preserved in formaldehyde which caused major disruptions to its relocation due to the toxic nature of the chemical.

In 2013 Kapitany purchased a small piece of the Chelyabinsk meteorite roughly the size of an Australian 20 cent coin.

Tom Kapitany was noted for his significance in bringing heteromorph fossil specimens of Blackdown formation in Queensland to international recognition in the geological catalog Heteromorph by Wolfgang Grulke.

In 2003, Kapitany donated a collection of minerals and fossils valued at more than A$200,000 to Museum Victoria through the Australian Government's Cultural Gifts Program.

In 2024, the newly described Permian fossil sea star species Ambigaster kapitanyi was named for Tom Kapitany, who collected the asteroid specimens and donated them to the Western Australian Museum.

=== National Dinosaur Museum ===
Tom Kapitany is one of five directors of the National Dinosaur Museum in Canberra, Australia.

=== Television ===
In 2002, ABC Catalyst interviewed Kapitany on the topic of fossil protection within Australia; saying that "we shouldn't condemn the whole fossil community based on a few rogue collectors. Nor should we condemn the scientific community on a few rogue scientists." He appeared as himself in Opal Hunters: Red Dirt Road Trip Season 2, Episode 6 ("Queen of Gems"), which features JC and Rod joining him on-site in Broken Hill to mine giant almandine garnets.He also appeared in Outback Crystal Hunters Season 2, Episode 3 ("Heart of Darwin Glass"), where he is featured leading an expedition as a crystal expert.He also appeared in Stuff The British Stole Season 3, Episode 5 ("Fire Star Rock"), where he is interviewed about the Fire Star Rock.

=== Publications ===
- Jiang, Zikun; Liu, Benpei; Wang, Yongdong; Huang, Min; Kapitany, Tom; Tian, Ning; Cao, Yong; Lu, Yuanzheng; Deng, Shenghui (19 March 2019). "Tree ring phototropism and implications for the rotation of the North China Block". Scientific Reports. 9 (1): 4856. Bibcode:2019NatSR...9.4856J. doi:10.1038/s41598-019-41339-2. PMC 6425038. PMID 30890749.
- Kirkland, C.L.; Johnson, T.E.; Kinny, P.D.; Kapitany, T. (January 2020). "Modelling U-Pb discordance in the Acasta Gneiss: Implications for fluid–rock interaction in Earth's oldest dated crust". Gondwana Research. 77: 223–237. Bibcode:2020GondR..77..223K. doi:10.1016/j.gr.2019.07.017. hdl:20.500.11937/80262.
- Flannery-Sutherland, Joseph T.; Kogan, Ilja; Trubin, Yaroslav S.; Falkingham, Peter L.; Winkler, Alina; De Sousa, David Donner; Krylov, Kiril D.; Pokhaznikova, Anastasia A.; Derbisheva, Meerim; Kapitany, Tamas; Dudashvili, Alexey (May 2023). "Dinosaur trackways from the Upper Cretaceous Nichkesai Formation near Mayluu Suu City, Southern Tien Shan Mountains, north-western Kyrgyzstan". Royal Society Open Science. 10 (5) 230311. Bibcode:2023RSOS...1030311F. doi:10.1098/rsos.230311. PMC 10206447. PMID 37234492.
- Luo, Tao; Li, Mufei; Deng, Xiaodong; Tu, Jiarun; Shen, Hongtao; Kapitany, Tom; Hu, Beining; Zhang, Wen; Hu, Zhaochu (February 2025). "Allanite U-Th-Pb geochronology by laser ablation inductively coupled plasma mass spectrometry: Evaluation and development of reference materials with low common Pb". Chemical Geology. 674 122562. doi:10.1016/j.chemgeo.2024.122562.
- Willink, Robbert J.; Kapitany, Tom (2024). "The crinoid Jimbacrinus bostocki from the Lower Permian Cundlego Formation near Gascoyne Junction, Western Australia". Alcheringa: An Australasian Journal of Palaeontology. 48 (2): 298–312. Bibcode:2024Alch...48..298W. doi:10.1080/03115518.2024.2323461.
- Salamon, Mariusz A.; Kapitany, Tamas; Płachno, Bartosz J. (2025). "First report of a nearly complete comatulid crinoid (Comatulida, Echinodermata) from the Cretaceous of Australia". Scientific Reports. 15 (1): 8610. Bibcode:2025NatSR..15.8610S. doi:10.1038/s41598-025-90111-2. PMC 11903946. PMID 40075114.
- Kapitany, Tom (2025). "Callaboanna Calling". Australian Age of Dinosaurs Journal. 22. https://australianageofdinosaursmuseumshop.com/products/aaod-journal-issue-22-2025.
- Salamon, Mariusz A.; Brachaniec, Tomasz; Bressan, Graciela S.; Ciesielczuk, Justyna; Esquivel-Macias, Carlos; Gaidzik, Krzysztof; Kapitany, Tamas; Klompmaker, Adiël A.; Krajewski, Marcin; Lazo, Dario G.; Oji, Tatsuo; Poatśkiewicz-Piecerzan, Bruna; Płachno, Bartosz J.; Rubilar Rodríguez, Alfonso; Wilk, Alicja; Humiński, Kamil; Gorzelak, Przemysław (2026). "Delayed deepening: Bathymetric patterns of post-Paleozoic stalked crinoids in the Panthalassan realm". Geology. doi:10.1130/G54806.1.
- Salamon, Mariusz A.; Wilk, Alicja; Krajewski, Marcin; Blake, Daniel B.; Kapitany, Tamas; Ruffin, Andrew; Irving, Joshua; Seekamp, Tim; Benyoucef, Madani; Płachno, Bartosz J. (2026). "An opaline window into Gondwana: Articulated Cretaceous crinoids and shallow-marine echinoderm communities from Coober Pedy, Australia". Gondwana Research. 159: 156–167. doi:10.1016/j.gr.2026.06.017.

== Honours and recognition ==
In 1984, Kapitany received the Rod Tallis Memorial Youth Award from the Australian Region of the International Plant Propagators' Society (IPPS).

== Legal issues ==
Around 2005, the Australian Federal Police raided Kapitany's collection located near Melbourne seizing over 600 kilograms (1,300 lb) of Chinese and Argentinian fossils, which were later repatriated to their home countries. In 2006, Kapitany was fined $US20,000 and sentenced to a year on probation after pleading guilty to illegally smuggling fossil dinosaur eggs from China to the US. Kapitany had been reportedly smuggling dinosaur eggs out of China since 1999 by mislabelling them as minerals, according to prosecutors.
