= Nathan Saatchi =

Iraqi businessman and textile merchant (1907–2000)

- Born: 24 December 1907; Baghdad, Ottoman Empire
- Died: 31 May 2000 (aged 92); London, England
- Burial place: Golders Green Jewish Cemetery
- Occupation(s): Businessman, textile merchant
- Children: 4, including Maurice and Charles

Nathan David Saatchi (Arabic: ناثان دافيد ساعتجي; 24 December 1907 – 31 May 2000) was an Iraqi businessman and textile merchant.

== Early life ==
Saatchi was born on 24 December 1907 into a middle-class Jewish family in Baghdad, then part of the Ottoman Empire. The name "Saatchi" (sā'atchi), which means "watchmaker", originates from Ottoman Turkish (Saat: Originally from Arabic, -çi: Turkish suffix meaning maker in context). He later moved to London.

== Career ==
In Iraq, Saatchi was a textile merchant and imported goods primarily from Manchester. Anticipating the Iraqi government's laws against Jews, he moved to England after World War II, settling in London where he acquired wool and textile factories.

== Personal life ==
In 1936, he married Daisy Ezair (1920–2000), and they had four sons, including:

- Charles Saatchi (b. 1943), a co-founder of the advertising agencies Saatchi & Saatchi and M&C Saatchi; he is also known for his art collection and for owning Saatchi Gallery.
- Maurice Saatchi (b. 1946), a co-founder of the Saatchi & Saatchi and M&C Saatchi; he was created a life peer as Baron Saatchi, of Staplefield in the County of West Sussex on 4 October 1996.

Saatchi died on 31 May 2000, and is buried at Golders Green Jewish Cemetery.
