= Maurice Saatchi, Baron Saatchi =

British businessman and politician (born 1946)

The Right Honourable The Lord Saatchi
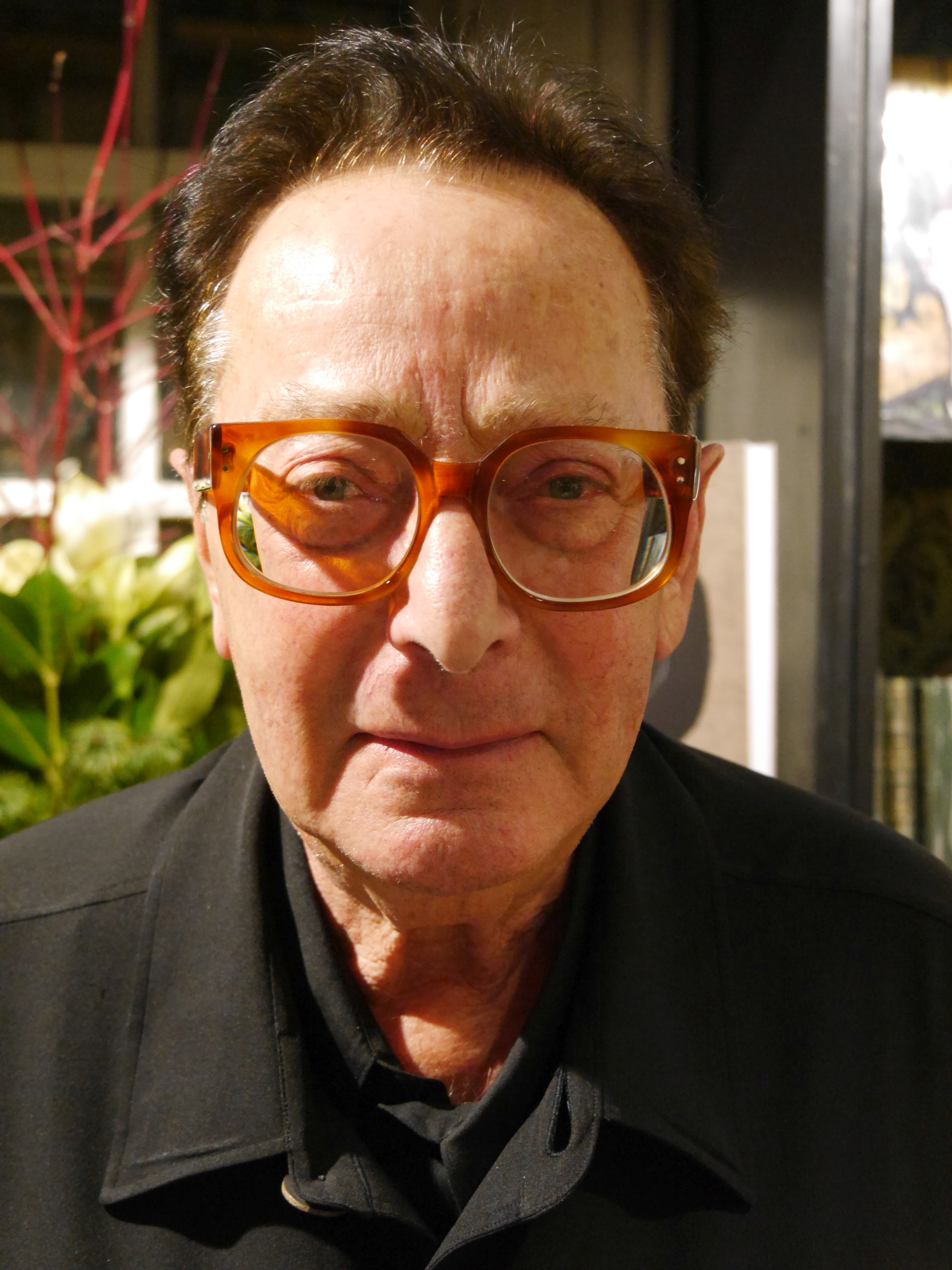
- Saatchi in 2022

Chairman of the Conservative Party
- In office 10 November 2003 – 22 May 2005; Serving with Liam Fox
- Leader: Michael Howard
- Preceded by: Theresa May
- Succeeded by: Francis Maude

Member of the House of Lords
- Lord Temporal
- Life peerage 4 October 1996

Personal details
- Born: Maurice Nathan Saatchi; 21 June 1946 (age 80) Baghdad, Kingdom of Iraq
- Party: Conservative
- Spouses: Gillian Osband (m. 1972; div. 1984) Josephine Hart (m. 1984; died 2011)
- Children: Edward Saatchi
- Parent(s): Nathan Saatchi; Daisy Ezer
- Relatives: Charles Saatchi (brother)
- Education: London School of Economics

Maurice Nathan Saatchi, Baron Saatchi (Arabic: موريس ساعتجي; born 21 June 1946) is a British businessman, and with his brother, Charles, the co-founder of the advertising agencies Saatchi & Saatchi and M&C Saatchi.

== Early life ==
Maurice Saatchi is the third of four sons born to Nathan Saatchi and Daisy Ezer, a wealthy Jewish family in Baghdad, Iraq. Maurice's brothers are David (born 1937), Charles Nathan (born 1943) and Philip (born 1953). Nathan was a successful textile merchant, and in 1947 he pre-empted a flight that tens of thousands of Iraqi Jews would soon make to avoid persecution and relocated his family to Finchley in London. Nathan purchased two textile mills in north London and after a time re-built a thriving business. Eventually the family would settle into a house with eight bedrooms on Hampstead Lane in Highgate.

Saatchi attended Tollington Grammar School and graduated from the London School of Economics with a first class honours degree in Sociology in 1967. His first job was at Haymarket Publications where Maurice would form valuable relationships with Michael Heseltine, the group managing director and with staff at the Haymarket's leading trade weekly for the ad industry Campaign. He spent three years at Haymarket as promotions manager before leaving to join his brother Charles' fledgling ad agency.

== Career ==
=== Saatchi and Saatchi ===
In 1970, Saatchi, with his brother, formed the advertising and communications agency Saatchi & Saatchi. They are credited with a number of successful advertising campaigns, most notably the "Labour isn't working" posters on behalf of the Conservative Party for the 1979 British general election and advertisements for the cigarette brand Silk Cut. Maurice Saatchi served as chairman of the firm which by 1986 – following its acquisition of advertising firm Ted Bates – had grown to be the largest ad agency in the world, with over 600 offices.

=== M&C Saatchi ===
At the turn of 1995, in the fallout from a shareholder revolt, Saatchi and his brother left the agency, and together founded the rival M&C Saatchi agency, taking with them many of their management and creative staff, as well as a number of clients – including British Airways. The new company has also been described as a success.

In mid 2019 M&C Saatchi PLC - a public company listed on the AIM exchange - reported to the City some accounting irregularities which would cause the company to take a charge lowering its 2018 and 2019 results. By the time the matter was finalised in December 2019 following a PricewaterhouseCoopers review, the accounting issues were quantified at £11.6M. Over the course of 2019 the company's share price took a significant tumble from near £4 down to 79p. Then in a shock announcement to the City on 10 December Saatchi resigned as an executive director along with all three of the independent non-executive directors – Sir Michael Peat, Baron Dobbs and Lorna Tilbian. It was reported that the departing directors disagreed over whether David Kershaw, one of Saatchi's co-founders of the company should stay as CEO following the accounting scandal.

=== Political career ===
Maurice Saatchi was created a life peer as Baron Saatchi (or, Lord Saatchi), of Staplefield in the County of West Sussex on 4 October 1996. He sits in the House of Lords as a Conservative. Under the leadership of Iain Duncan Smith, Saatchi served as shadow Treasury spokesman in the Lords, forming a close relationship with Michael Howard, who was Shadow Chancellor of the Exchequer. Saatchi argued for the simplification of the tax system and that the poorest eight million people in the United Kingdom should not pay income tax. In June 2014, he suggested that small businesses should pay no corporate tax and that investors in said small businesses should pay no capital gains tax in order to "challenge cartel capitalism."

After Howard became leader of the Conservatives in November 2003, Saatchi was appointed joint chairman of the party with Liam Fox. He had responsibility for running the party campaign for the 2005 general election, after which he stepped down. He published his reflections on the election campaign in a Centre for Policy Studies pamphlet If this is Conservatism, I am a Conservative in a chapter entitled How I Lost the Election. Among his failings listed in the document, Saatchi highlighted the following:

- I DID NOT convince the Party that if you don't stand for something, you'll fall for anything.
- I DID NOT dispel the illusion of research, which said that, as immigration was the number one issue in deciding how people vote, it should be the number one topic.
- I DID NOT prevent economics, the Conservatives' former ace of trumps, becoming a 'second order issue.'
- I DID NOT avoid the underestimation of public intelligence, as in the policy description 'Lower Taxes' when in fact taxes would be higher.

He recommended that future Conservative leaders establish a "moral purpose" as an ideology and future direction for the Party.

Following the death of his wife Josephine Hart to ovarian cancer, Maurice Saatchi has campaigned for a change to the UK law which, he believes, holds doctors back from using innovative treatments because they fear litigation. His Medical Innovation Bill was formally introduced in 2013 and was co-adopted by the government in its passage through parliament. The bill has enjoyed some popular support and favourable press coverage, but has drawn a critical response from some medical and legal bodies, patient groups and charities.

=== Other roles ===
He was chairman of the Finsbury Food Group plc, and is a governor of the London School of Economics. Saatchi is a trustee of the Museum of Garden History, and also a director of the Centre for Policy Studies. He was also a trustee of the Victoria and Albert Museum from 1988 to 1996.

== Accolades and philanthropy ==
He is a previous recipient of St. George's Society of New York's Medal of Honour, an award established in 1996 which recognizes those who have rendered exemplary service to British interests and/or the international community at large.

He and his brother founded the Saatchi Shul, an independent Orthodox Jewish synagogue in Maida Vale, London, England, in 1998.

== Personal life ==
Saatchi's first wife was Gillian Osband, a children's book editor and writer whom he had known since childhood and whom he married in 1972. They divorced in 1984 and that same year he married the novelist Josephine Hart (1942–2011), whom he first met when they worked together at Haymarket Publications in 1967. She died on 2 June 2011.

His country property is a mock Tudor castle called Old Hall in Staplefield, West Sussex, built in 1842. There are sixty acres of parkland and ten acres of flowers, trees and lakes. Maurice Saatchi has a fondness for gardening, laid out the garden on the estate and built a conservatory to house semi-tropical plants. The property was the subject of a display article in Architectural Digest in January 1995.

Maurice Saatchi and his brother Charles were listed at number 366 in the Sunday Times Rich List 2008, with an estimated wealth of £220m in advertising and art. In the Sunday Times Rich List 2009 they were listed at number 438.

In December 2024, Saatchi told The Times he was in a new relationship with Lynn Forester de Rothschild.

== Arms ==
Coat of arms of Maurice Saatchi, Baron Saatchi
Crest A butterfly Or wings addorsed Azure supporting a quill Argent spined Or. Escutcheon Azure a pale couped in chief and there conjoined to a pallet a barrulet embowed and a chevronel throughout reversed and embowed Argent issuing from each point of conjunction a hazel nut slipped Or. Supporters On either side an Angel Proper vested Argent crined and winged Or about the waist a sash Azure in the exterior hand a sword point downwards Argent hilt pommel and quillons and enflamed Or. Motto Thinking Makes It So Badge A bar wavy couped composed of two troughs and a wave invected of one point on the upper edge and engrailed of one point on the lower edge the upper edge irradiated Or and the lower edge fimbriated Azure

== Bibliography ==
- Maurice Saatchi, Do Not Resuscitate: The Life and Afterlife of Maurice Saatchi
- Maurice Saatchi, If this is Conservatism, I am a Conservative from the Centre for Policy Studies

Party political offices
Preceded by Theresa May	Chairman of the Conservative Party; 2003–2005; Served alongside: Liam Fox	Succeeded by Francis Maude
Orders of precedence in the United Kingdom
Preceded by The Lord Taylor of Warwick	Gentlemen; Baron Saatchi	Followed by The Lord Alderdice
