= Charles Saatchi =

British businessman (born 1943)

- Born: 9 June 1943 (age 83); Baghdad, Kingdom of Iraq
- Education: London College of Communication
- Occupations: Advertising executive, art collector and creative director
- Known for: Saatchi Gallery; Saatchi & Saatchi; M&C Saatchi
- Spouses: Doris Lockhart (m. 1973; div. 1990) Kay Hartenstein (m. 1990; div. 2001) Nigella Lawson (m. 2003; div. 2013)
- Children: 1
- Parent(s): Nathan Saatchi; Daisy Ezer
- Relatives: Maurice Saatchi (brother)
- Website: www.charlessaatchi.com

Charles Saatchi (/ˈsɑːtʃi/ SAH-chee; Arabic: تشارلز ساعتجي, romanized: Tšārliz Sā‘atjī; born 9 June 1943) is an Iraqi-British businessman and the co-founder, with his brother Maurice, of advertising agency Saatchi & Saatchi. The brothers led the business, the world's largest advertising agency in the 1980s, until they left the agency in 1995. In the same year, the brothers formed a new agency called M&C Saatchi.

Saatchi is also known for his art collection and for owning Saatchi Gallery, and in particular for his sponsorship of the Young British Artists (YBAs), including Damien Hirst and Tracey Emin.

== Early life ==
Charles Saatchi was born in Baghdad, Iraq, the second of four sons, to the wealthy family of Nathan Saatchi and Daisy Ezer. The name "Saatchi" ساعتچی, which means "watchmaker" in Turkish, has a long history in Iran and its bearers are mostly Jewish. Saatchi's brothers are David (born 1937), Maurice (born 1946) and Philip (born 1953).

In 1947, his father, a textile merchant, fled persecution in Iraq and relocated his family to Finchley, north London. Nathan Saatchi purchased two textile mills in north London and after a time, rebuilt a thriving business. Eventually the family would settle into an eight-bedroom house in Hampstead Lane, Highgate.

Saatchi attended Christ's College, a secondary school in Finchley, north London. During this time, he developed an obsession with US pop culture, including the music of Elvis Presley, Little Richard and Chuck Berry. He has described as "life-changing" the experience of viewing a Jackson Pollock painting at the Museum of Modern Art in New York. He then progressed to study at the London College of Communication.

== Advertising career ==
=== Early career ===
In 1965, Saatchi undertook his first advertising role as a copywriter in the London office of Benton & Bowles, where he met Doris Lockhart (later his first wife). Saatchi paired up with art director Ross Cramer and they worked as a team at Collett Dickenson Pearce and John Collins & Partners before leaving in 1967 to open creative consultancy Cramer Saatchi.

Unusually for a creative consultancy, they took on employees: John Hegarty – previously Saatchi's art director at Benton & Bowles, who would later go on to run rival agency Bartle Bogle Hegarty – and Jeremy Sinclair, who as of 2016 still retained a senior role at M&C Saatchi. In addition to offering consulting with ad agencies they also took on some clients directly.

=== Saatchi and Saatchi ===
In 1970, he started the advertising agency Saatchi & Saatchi with his brother Maurice, which by 1986 – following its acquisition of advertising firm Ted Bates – had grown to be the largest ad agency in the world, with over 600 offices. Successful campaigns in the UK included Silk Cut's advertisements in preparation for the ban on named tobacco advertising, and the Conservative Party's 1979 general election victory – led by Margaret Thatcher through the slogan "Labour Isn't Working".

=== M&C Saatchi ===
At the turn of 1995, Saatchi and his brother left the agency, and together founded the rival M&C Saatchi agency, taking with them many of their management and creative staff, as well as a number of clients – including British Airways.

== Art ==
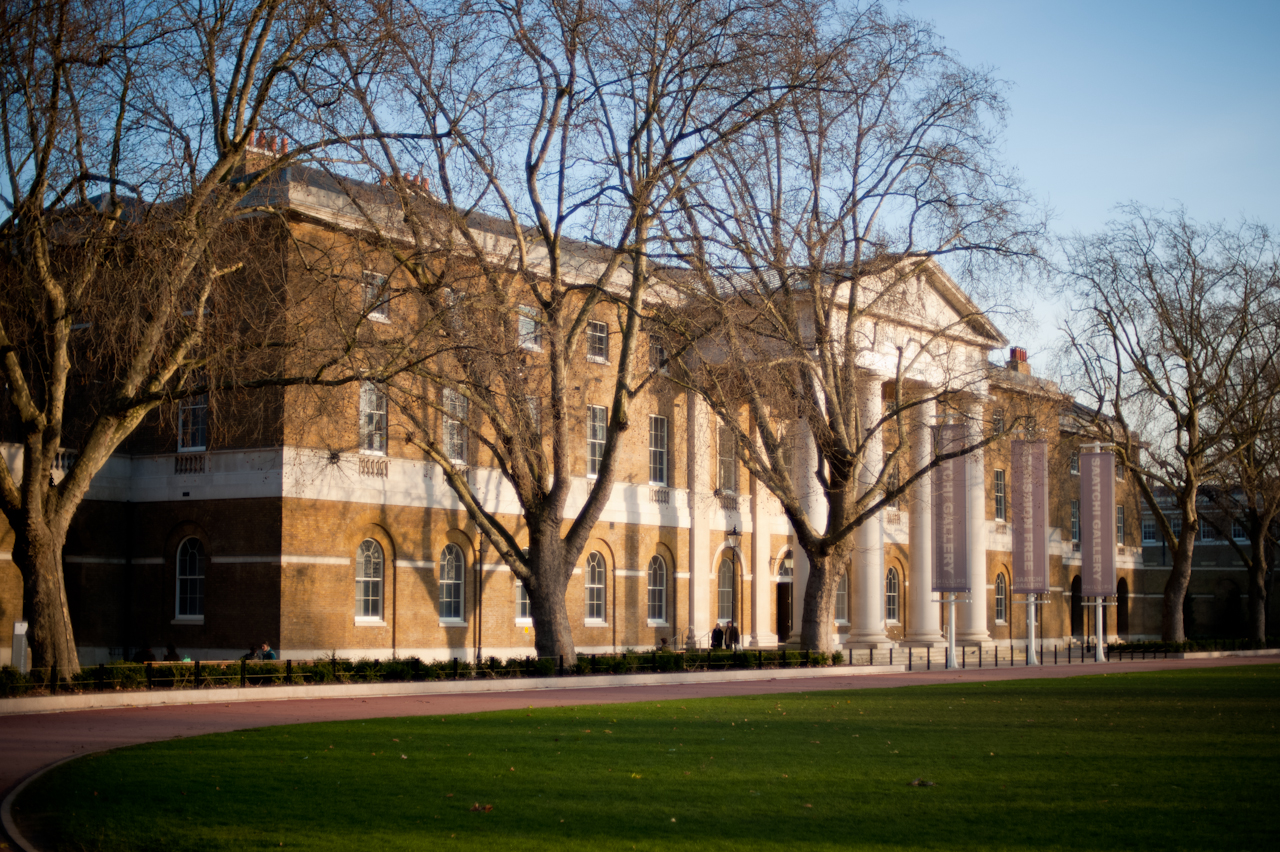
The Saatchi Gallery's new premises in Chelsea, which opened in October 2008

In 1969, at age 26, Saatchi purchased his first work of art by Sol LeWitt, a New York minimalist. Saatchi initially patronised the Lisson Gallery in Marylebone, London, which specialised in American minimalist works. He later purchased an entire show by Robert Mangold.

In the early 1980s, Saatchi purchased a 30,000 sq ft (2,800 m^{2}) cement-floored and steel-girded warehouse at 98A Boundary Road in the residential London suburb of St John's Wood. The building was transformed by architect Max Gordon into the Saatchi Gallery, which was subsequently opened to the public in February 1985 to exhibit the art Saatchi had collected.

At one point, the Saatchi collection contained 11 works by Donald Judd, 21 by Sol LeWitt, 23 by Anselm Kiefer, 17 Andy Warhols and 27 by Julian Schnabel.

His taste has changed from American abstraction and minimalism to the Young British Artists (YBAs), whose work he first saw at Goldsmith's Art School. At the YBAs' 1990 Gambler exhibition, Saatchi bought Damien Hirst's first major 'animal' installation, A Thousand Years. In 1991, he acquired major artworks by Hirst and Marc Quinn, becoming instrumental in launching their careers. His renown as a patron peaked in 1997, when part of his collection was shown at the Royal Academy as the exhibition Sensation, which travelled to Berlin and New York causing headlines and some offence (for example, to the families of children murdered by Myra Hindley, who was portrayed in one of the works), and consolidating the position of Hirst, Emin and other YBAs.

In 2009, he published the book My Name Is Charles Saatchi And I Am An Artoholic. Subtitled "Everything You Need To Know About Art, Ads, Life, God And Other Mysteries And Weren't Afraid To Ask", it presents Saatchi's answers to a number of questions submitted by members of the public and journalists.

From November to December 2009, he had a television programme on the BBC called School of Saatchi in which he gave young aspiring artists an opportunity to showcase their work. He made no appearance in the programme, only communicating through an assistant.

In July 2010, Charles Saatchi announced he would be donating the Saatchi Gallery and over 200 works of art to the British public.

The Saatchi Gallery featured in a list of the most visited art museums in the world, based on an attendance survey for 2014, compiled by The Art Newspaper, with 1,505,608 visitors. In the same survey, the gallery was shown to have hosted 15 of the 20 most visited exhibitions in London over the last 5 years.

In October 2020, Charles Saatchi's daughter, Phoebe Saatchi-Yates and husband Arthur Yates, opened Saatchi Yates on Cork Street, London.

== Publications ==
Books published by Charles Saatchi include:

- Looking Over Your Opponent's Shoulder. (1998) Bow Publications. ISBN 0861291484
- Charles Saatchi: Question. (2010) Phaidon. ISBN 9780714857091
- My Name Is Charles Saatchi And I Am An Artoholic. (2012) Phaidon. ISBN 9781861543332
- Be the Worst You Can be: Life's Too Long for Patience and Virtue. (2012) Abrams. ISBN 9781419703737
- The Naked Eye. (2013) Booth-Clibborn Editions. ISBN 9781861543400
- Babble. (2013) Booth-Clibborn Editions. ISBN 9781861543370
- Known Unknowns. (2014) Booth-Clibborn Editions. ISBN 9781861543608
- DEAD, A Celebration of Mortality. (2015) Booth-Clibborn Editions. ISBN 9781861543592
- Beyond Belief: Racist, Sexist, Rude, Crude and Dishonest: The Golden Age of Madison Avenue. (2015) Booth-Clibborn Editions. ISBN 9781861543721

== Television ==
- The Real Saatchis: Masters of Illusion (1999, Channel 4)
- School of Saatchi (2009, BBC Two)

== Philanthropy ==
Charles Saatchi and his brother founded an independent Jewish synagogue, named Saatchi Shul in Maida Vale, London, England, in 1998, in honour of their parents.

In December 1998, Saatchi donated 130 artworks to a Christie's auction that raised £1.7 million, creating scholarship bursaries at four London art schools.

In February 1999, he gave an additional 100 pieces of artwork from his collection to the Arts Council of Great Britain.

In July 2010, Charles Saatchi announced he would be donating the Saatchi Gallery and over 200 works of art to the British public. The donation was estimated to be worth £30 million.

== Personal life ==
According to the Times Online, Saatchi is "reclusive", even hiding from clients when they visited his agency's offices and, as of February 2009, has only ever granted two newspaper interviews. He does not attend his own exhibition openings; when asked why by the Sunday Telegraph, he replied: "I don't go to other people's openings, so I extend the same courtesy to my own."

In the Sunday Times Rich List 2009 ranking of the wealthiest people in the UK, he was grouped with his brother Maurice, with an estimated joint fortune of £120 million.

=== Marriages ===
Saatchi first met Doris Lockhart Dibley (as she was then known) in 1965 when she was a copy group head above him at Benton & Bowles. She was a native of Memphis, Tennessee, and Kevin Goldman describes her as "a sophisticated woman who spoke several languages, knew a great deal about art and wine and who had graduated from Smith College and the Sorbonne". She became known during their marriage as an art and design journalist, with particular knowledge of American art and minimalism. They lived together for six years before getting married in 1973 and divorcing in 1990.

Saatchi's second wife was Kay Hartenstein (to whom he was married from 1990 to 2001), an American Condé Nast advertising executive from Little Rock, Arkansas. Together they have a daughter, Phoebe.

In 2003, Saatchi married his third wife, British journalist, author and cook Nigella Lawson. In January 2011, Saatchi and Lawson moved from their former home in Belgravia to a new home in Chelsea, London. This was a double fronted seven-bedroom villa converted from its former use as a warehouse and 200 metres from Saatchi's contemporary art gallery in King's Road. They lived with her two children Cosima and Bruno, as well as Phoebe.

In June 2013, while dining at Scott's, a London seafood restaurant, Saatchi was photographed with his hands around Lawson's throat. The day after the pictures were published, Saatchi said they were misleading and depicted only a "playful tiff". He was formally cautioned for assault and voluntarily accepted the caution following an investigation by the police.

In early July of the same year it was announced that the couple were to divorce. Lawson cited ongoing unreasonable behaviour in her divorce petition. On 31 July 2013, seven weeks after the incident, Saatchi and Lawson were granted a decree nisi. They reached a private financial settlement. R v Grillo and Grillo, a trial for fraud involving the former couple's two Italian-born personal assistants, sisters Elisabetta and Francesca Grillo, began on 27 November 2013.

In the same year Saatchi began a relationship with Trinny Woodall, an English beauty entrepreneur and author. The couple has split.
