= Doris Lockhart Saatchi =

American art collector (1937–2025)

Doris Jean Lockhart Saatchi (February 28, 1937 – August 6, 2025) was an American art collector. She and her ex-husband Charles Saatchi were major figures in promoting postwar American art and the Young British Artists.

== Life and career ==
Born Doris Jean Lockhart in Memphis, Tennessee, daughter of Chicago newspaper editor Jack H. Lockhart, she grew up mainly in Scarsdale, New York, and was educated at Scarsdale High School.

Kevin Goldman describes her as "a sophisticated woman who spoke several languages, knew a great deal about art and wine and who had graduated from Smith College and the Sorbonne".

After graduating from Smith in 1958, she moved to the United Kingdom in the 1960s, working as a copy group head at the London office of Benton & Bowles advertising agency.

Lockhart married racing driver Hugh Dibley on February 27, 1965, before separating in 1967. She began a relationship with Charles Saatchi, whom she'd met in 1965 when she worked above him at Benton & Bowles, and the pair lived together for six years then married in 1973.

Doris Lockhart Saatchi became known during her marriage to Charles as an art and design journalist, with particular knowledge of American art and minimalism. The Saatchis began collecting art in the 1970s. In 1985 they opened a museum, the Saatchi Gallery, to showcase their collection. They divorced in 1990.

Saatchi died from kidney disease at a London hospital, on August 6, 2025, at the age of 88.
