= List of people associated with Goldsmiths, University of London =

This is a list of Goldsmiths College people, including office holders, current and former academics, and alumni of the Goldsmiths, University of London.

An alumnus is a former student or pupil of a school, college, or university. Commonly, but not always, the word refers to a graduate of the educational institute in question.

The head of Goldsmiths is known as the Warden.

== Wardens ==
- 1905–1915: William Loring; first warden, killed in action during the First World War
- 1915–1927: Thomas Raymont (1915–1919, Acting Warden)
- 1927–1950: Arthur Edis Dean
- 1950–1953: Aubrey Joseph Price
- 1953: Clive Gardiner (Acting Warden)
- 1953–1974: Sir Ross Chesterman
- 1974–1975: Francis Michael Glenn Wilson
- 1975: Cyril Wallington Green (Acting Warden)
- 1976–1984: Richard Hoggart
- 1984–1992: Andrew Rutherford
- 1992–1998: Ken Gregory
- 1998–2004: Ben Pimlott
- 2005–2010: Geoffrey Crossick
- 2010–2019: Pat Loughrey
- 2019–present: Frances Corner

== Notable academics ==
Current and former academics, with their most senior appointment held shown

- Joan Anim-Addo, Professor of Caribbean Literature and Culture
- Chris Baldick, Professor of English
- Ros Barber, Lecturer in Creative and Life Writing
- Zach Blas, former Lecturer of Visual Cultures
- Petronella Breinburg, former Senior Lecturer and head of Caribbean Centre
- Dejan Djokić, Professor of History
- Maura Dooley, Emeritus Professor of Creative and Live Writing
- Cyril Edwards, Senior Lecturer in German
- Kodwo Eshun, Lecturer of Aural And Visual Culture
- Mark Fisher, Lecturer of Visual Cultures
- Paul Fouracre. Professor of History
- Chris French, Professor of Psychology
- Matthew Fuller, Professor of Cultural Studies
- Stanley Glasser, Professor of Music
- David Graeber, Reader in Social Anthropology
- Richard Grayson, Professor of Twentieth Century History
- Keith Hart, Professor of Anthropology
- Margot Heinemann, former professor of English
- Gerard Hemsworth, former Director of the MFA Fine Art Program
- Julian Henriques, Professor of Media and Communication
- Constance Howard, former embroidery lecturer
- Alexander Ivashkin, Professor of Music
- Gholam Khiabany, Reader in Media and Communications
- Scott Lash, Professor of Sociology and Cultural Studies
- Carl Levy, Professor of Politics
- Adam Mars-Jones, Professor of Creative Writing
- Angela McRobbie, Professor of Communications
- Heidi Safia Mirza, Visiting professor of Race, Faith and Culture
- Blake Morrison, Professor of Creative and Life Writing
- George Musgrave
- Saul Newman, Professor of Political Theory
- Deirdre Osborne, Reader in English Literature and Drama, co-convenor MA in Black British Writing
- Jan Plamper, Professor of History
- Nirmal Puwar, Reader in Sociology
- Irit Rogoff, Professor of Visual Cultures
- Michael Rosen, Professor of Children's Literature
- Francis Spufford, Professor of Creative Writing
- Eyal Weizman, Professor of Spatial & Visual Cultures
- John Wood, Professor of Design

== Notable alumni ==
A

- Damon Albarn
- Rachel Aldred
- John Allum
- Felix Alvarez
- Edith Alice Andrews
- Leonard Appelbee
- Athanasios Argianas
- Arndís Þórarinsdóttir
- Knut Åsdam
- John Austin (politician)

B

- Katy B
- Les Back
- Rob da Bank
- Fiona Banner
- Simeon Barclay
- Princess Beatrice of York
- Chris Beckett
- Bernd Behr
- Kristyan Benedict
- Johanna Bennett
- Henry Berry (politician)
- Jennifer Otter Bickerdike
- Vivien Blackett
- Audrey Blackman
- James Blake (musician)
- Kathrin Böhm
- Henry Bond
- Emily Booth
- Leah Borromeo
- Martyn Brabbins
- Philippe Bradshaw
- Jack Brewer
- Pablo Bronstein
- Will Brooker
- Alexander Brown (director)
- Moira Buffini
- Angela Bulloch
- Bill Burns (artist)
- Paul Bush

C

- Esther Cailingold
- Lucy Caldwell
- John Cale
- Brycchan Carey
- Ajay Chabra
- Jack Chalker
- Eddie Chambers (writer and artist)
- Suki Chan
- Lawrence Chandler
- Liam Charles
- Nelson Chia
- Adam Chodzko
- Julian Clary
- Helen Clifton
- Ernest A. Cole
- Matthew Collings
- Stephan Collishaw
- Paule Constable
- Quilla Constance
- A. G. Cook
- Jean Cooke
- Eileen Cooper
- Jessica Cooper
- Corrie Corfield
- Chris Corner
- Stéphane Cornicard
- Laura Coryton
- Graham Coxon
- John Craxton
- Helen Cross (author)
- Stephen Crowe (composer)
- Esmé Currey
- Blue Curry

D

- Ely Dagher
- Paul Daly
- Siobhan Daly
- Elena Damiani
- Lance Dann
- Paul Dash
- Ian Davenport
- Grenville Davey
- Michael Dean
- Kirsty Dillon
- John Doubleday
- Paul Drury
- Joyce Dunbar

E

- Geoffrey Eastop
- Emily Eavis
- Ken Edwards
- Charles Ejogo
- Wade Elliott
- Sarah Emerson
- Edward Enninful
- Ben Enwonwu
- Bernardine Evaristo
- Roberta Everett

F

- Angus Fairhurst
- John William Fletcher
- Ceal Floyer
- James Robert Ford
- Michael Ford
- Iain Forsyth and Jane Pollard
- William Fox-Pitt
- Susannah Frankel
- Lucian Freud
- Nick Fudge

G

- Simon Gales
- Anya Gallaccio
- Susan Gamble
- Assaf Gavron
- Sue Gee
- Sarah Gillespie
- Liam Gillick
- Alan Gilmour
- Goldierocks
- Eileen Greenwood
- Antony Gormley
- Niven Govinden
- Peter Graham (composer)
- Frances Grey (actress)
- Brian Griffiths
- Vaughan Grylls
- Claudio Guarino

H

- Robin Haigh
- Simon Hale
- Danny L Harle
- Ellie Harrison (artist)
- John Harvey (author)
- Marcus Harvey
- Owen Hatherley
- Max Hattler
- Jacqui Hawkins
- Norman Hepple
- Cecil Higgs
- Rowland Hilder
- Bader Ben Hirsi
- Damien Hirst
- C. Walter Hodges
- Robert Hodgins
- Pete Hoida
- Andy Holden (artist)
- Carl Hopgood
- Alex Horne
- Rachel Howard
- Huang Ching-yin
- Des Hughes (artist)
- Gary Hume

I

- John Illsley
- Tom Ingleby
- Neil Innes
- Albert Irvin

J

- Alex James (musician)
- Cathy Jamieson
- Rose Jang
- Yuan Chai and Jian Jun Xi
- Aowen Jin
- Darren Johnson
- Linton Kwesi Johnson
- Sarah Jones (artist)
- Anthony Joseph
- Tessa Jowell
- Laurence Juber
- Gerry Judah

K

- Marion Kalmus
- Emma Kay
- Stathis Kefallonitis
- Dennis Kelly
- Jill Kemp
- Ingrid Kerma
- Kanya King
- Gabriele Koch
- Kalki Koechlin
- Aleksander Kolkowski
- Tadeusz Kościński
- Shay Kun
- Twinkle Khanna

L

- George Lambourn
- Walter Landor
- Michael Landy
- Abigail Lane
- Malcolm Laycock
- CN Lester
- John Lewis (typographer)
- Simon Lewis
- Angela Little (academic)
- Peter Lowe (artist)
- Rosie Lowe
- Gus Lobban
- Sarah Lucas
- Lisa Lynch

M

- David McCalden
- Kerry McCarthy
- Mark McGowan (performance artist)
- Ian Mackenzie-Kerr
- Malcolm McLaren
- Wendy McMurdo
- Steve McQueen (director)
- Tom MacRae
- Fiona Mactaggart
- Goshka Macuga
- Martin Maloney
- John Maltby
- Mary Martin (artist)
- Hisham Matar
- Chris Meigh-Andrews
- Kobena Mercer
- Joseph Mercier
- Lala Meredith-Vula
- Maria Minerva
- Gladys Mitchell
- Maggie Mitchell
- Moko (singer)
- Brian Molko
- Cathy de Monchaux
- Ian Monroe
- Gareth Morgan (painter)
- Gwenda Morgan
- Stephen Morgan (MP)
- Frances Morrell
- Paul Morrison (artist)
- Olive Mudie-Cooke
- Dave Myers (British chef)

N

- Joanna Nadin
- Yvonne Ndege
- Virginia Nimarkoh
- Geoff Norcott

O

- Mairead O'hEocha
- David Olshanetsky
- Donna Ong
- Julian Opie
- Roy Oxlade

P

- Suzanne Packer
- Stephen Park
- Molly Parkin
- Richard Patterson (artist)
- Simon Patterson (artist)
- Alicia Paz
- Hannah Perry
- Nick Petford
- Inigo Philbrick
- Mike Phillips (writer)
- Dame Erica Pienaar
- Andrew Poppy
- Cyril Power
- Alison Prince

Q

- Mary Quant

R

- Fiona Rae
- Shama Rahman
- Alessandro Raho
- Ross Raisin
- Alan Rankle
- Nabil Abdul Rashid
- Merlyn Rees
- Ken Reid (comedian)
- Phyl Rendell
- Ray Richardson
- Ian Rickson
- Bridget Riley
- Tommy Roberts (designer)
- Amy Robbins
- Stephen Robson (artist)
- Ellen Rogers

S

- Amy Sackville
- Diane Samuels
- San Win
- Sarah Sands
- Peter Schmidt (artist)
- Mark Sealy
- Lindsay Seers
- Joshua Seigal
- Hilda Selwyn-Clarke
- Yinka Shonibare
- Keir Simmons
- Chris Skudder
- Simon Slater
- Gabriel Sleath
- Gordon Slynn
- Anj Smith
- Bob and Roberta Smith
- Bridget Smith
- Peter Snow (artist)
- Kenneth Spring
- Patric Standford
- Fergal Stapleton
- Jemima Stehli
- Emma Stibbon
- Tena Štivičić
- Matthew Strachan
- Rebecca Strickson
- Graham Sutherland

T

- Tang Da Wu
- Tang Ying Chi
- Robin Tanner
- David Tattersall
- Benedict Taylor (musician)
- Sam Taylor-Wood
- Kae Tempest
- Gemma Thompson
- Shirley Thompson (composer)
- Þórhallur Gunnarsson (Thorhallur)
- David Thorpe (artist)
- Pádraig Timoney
- Christine Tobin
- James Tomalin
- Thomas Trevor (curator)
- Nobuko Tsuchiya
- Julian Turner

U

- R. J. Unstead

V

- John Vinelott
- Richard Von White

W

- Errollyn Wallen
- Dayne Walling
- Mark Wallinger
- Amelia Warner
- Huw Warren
- Katherine Weare
- Gillian Wearing
- Carel Weight
- Denton Welch
- Alastair White
- Mary White (ceramicist and calligrapher)
- Roger Williams (organist)
- Jane and Louise Wilson
- Beatie Wolfe
- Clare Woods (artist)
- Laila Woozeer
- John Worsley (artist)
- Ian Wright (illustrator)
- Evie Wyld

X

- Maria X
- Jian Jun Xi

Y

- Catherine Yass
- Rory Young

Z

- Alex Zane
- Lijia Zhang
