= Guarino =

Guarino is an Italian name that is derived from the word guardia or guardiano meaning ‘to guard’ or ‘to protect’. The name refers to several notable people:

== Given name ==
- Guarin (c. 1100–1137), Siculo-Norman (later Italy) general and chancellor
- Guarino da Verona (1370–1460), Renaissance humanist
- Guarino Foscari or Guarinus of Palestrina (c. 1080 - 6 February 1158), Cardinal-Bishop of Palestrina from December 1144
- Guarino Guarini (1624–1683), Italian artist
- Guarino Moretti, a.k.a. Willie Moretti (1894–1951), Italian-American mafioso

== Surname ==
- Battista Guarino (1434–1513), Renaissance humanist
- Claudio Guarino (1966-2004), Italian-born multimedia visual artis
- Francesco Guarino (1611–1651 or 1654), Italian painter of the Baroque period
- Giuseppe Guarino (cardinal) (1827-1897), Italian Roman Catholic Archbishop of Messina and cardinal
- Giuseppe Guarino (film director) (1885-1963), Italian film director, producer and screenwriter
- Giuseppe Guarino (politician) (1922–2020), Italian legal scholar and politician
- Javier Guarino (born 1986), Uruguayan footballer
- Laetitia Guarino, Miss Switzerland 2014
- Lawrence Nicholas "Larry" Guarino (1922–2014), a U.S. Air Force officer, and veteran of three wars
- Martin Guarino (born 1990), Argentine professional footballer
- Nicola Guarino (born 1954), group leader of the Laboratory for Applied Ontology and co-creator of the OntoClean methodology
- Philip Guarino (1907–1993), former priest and alleged Freemason associated with Licio Gelli and George H. W. Bush
- Rita Guarino (born 1971), Italian football manager
- Robin Guarino (born 1960), female opera and film director
- Stephen Guarino (born 1975), American actor and comedian

== See also ==
- Guarinus (disambiguation)
