= Stephen McNeilly =

British artist (born 1968)

Stephen McNeilly (born 1968) is a London-based artist and writer whose research-lead practice includes photography, filmmaking, curating and book publishing. He is the executive director and museum director of the Swedenborg Society, London, and oversees its annual Swedenborg Film Festival and Artist in Residence programme. He is also the founding editor of the Swedenborg Review.

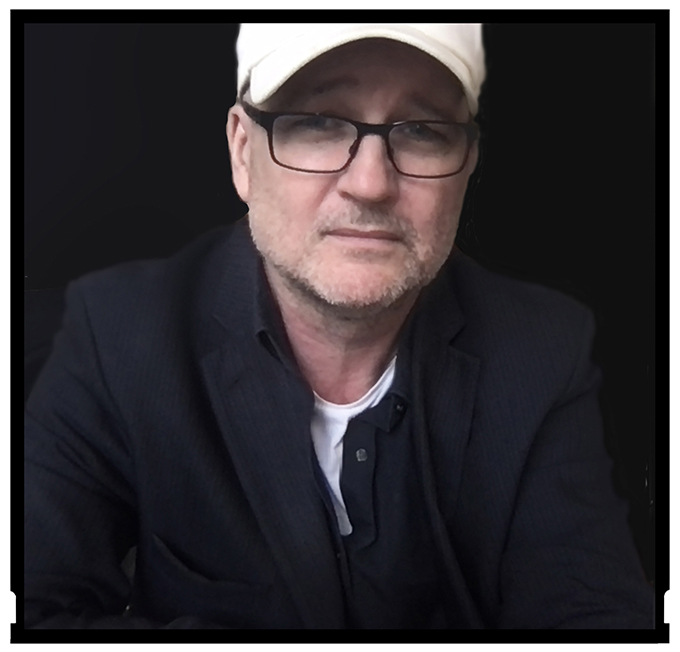
Portrait of Stephen McNeilly

In 2010 he curated Fourteen Interventions, a multi-disciplinary site responsive exhibition at Swedenborg house, which included work by Jeremy Deller, Bridget Smith, Iain Sinclair, Ben Judd and Olivia Plender. In 2016, with Bridget Smith, he co-curated Now it is Permitted: 24 Wayside Posters, an exhibition of posters designed by Bridget Smith and Fraser Muggeridge which included contributions by Cornelia Parker, Fiona Banner, Marina Warner, Chloe Aridjis, Ali Smith, Michael Landy, Gavin Turk and others. Other exhibitions curated by McNeilly include Swedenborg and the English Romantics, an exhibition of artefacts and artworks by William Blake, S. T. Coleridge, John Flaxman, Philip James de Loutherbourg and Emanuel Swedenborg exploring conceptual tropes of the 18th century, and The Story of Swedenborg in 27 Objects, which included items by Josephine Butler, T. E. Lawrence, D. T. Suzuki, Vernon Watkins amongst others.

His long-standing interest in the work of Emanuel Swedenborg informs much of his work and he has published on writers as diverse as Ralph Waldo Emerson and Arthur Cravan. In 2011 he set up the Swedenborg Archive imprint, a project which has included contributions from the writers Peter Ackroyd, Homero Aridjis, A. S. Byatt, J. M. G. Le Clézio, Ken Worpole, Iain Sinclair and Brian Catling, Tomas Tranströmer and the publisher Book Works. As series editor of the Journal of the Swedenborg Society he has produced a number of volumes exploring the intellectual and cultural influence of Swedenborg including Between Method and Madness, The Arms of Morpheus, In Search of the Absolute and On the True Philosopher. Notable contributors to the Journal include the poet Czeslaw Milosz and the Cambridge linguist John Chadwick. Annalisa Volpone has described the Journal as a 'mapping of the impact of Swedenborg's thought on the western literary imaginaire from romanticism to contemporary times'.

McNeilly is a founding editor of Dedecus Press, an interdisciplinary and collaborative publishing project, and is the overseeing editor for the Dedecus Dictionary and the Dedecus Picture Archive. Between 2004 and 2012 he was a visiting lecturer in art, Philosophy and Critical Theory at the University of Creative Arts (Canterbury).

== Selected works ==
- 2021 The Story of Swedenborg in 27 Objects (exhibition and catalogue), Curator and Author, London. ISBN 978-0854482221
- 2020 On the Conjugial Angel, an essay by A S Byatt (book), Editor. ISBN 978-0854481705
- 2019 An Evening of Dreams, with contributions by Homero Aridjis, Chloe Aridjis, Eva Hoffman, Darian Leader, Tom McCarthy and Selina Mills (book). Editor. ISBN 978-0854482061
- 2018 Swedenborg and the English Romantics (exhibition), Curator, London.
- 2018 In Celebration Of Tomas Tranströmer, with contributions by Robin Robertson, Tomas Tranströmer, Per Wåstberg and others (book). Editor. ISBN 978-0854482078
- 2017 Ad caput capitas: the lost skulls of Swedenborg, with Iain Sinclair and Colin Dickey (exhibition), Curator, London.
- 2016 Now it is Permitted: 24 Wayside Posters (exhibition), co-curated with Bridget Smith, London.
- 2013 Swimming to Heaven: The Lost Rivers of London, an essay by Iain Sinclair, (book), Editor. ISBN 978-0854481798
- 2013 Philosophy, Literature, Mysticism: an anthology of essays on the thought and influence of Emanuel Swedenborg (book), Editor. ISBN 978-0854481613
- 2012 Several Clouds Colliding (book), by Brian Catling and Iain Sinclair (book). Editor. ISBN 978-1906012410
- 2012 D T Suzuki: manuscripts and letters (exhibition), Curator, London.
- 2012 Memoirs of Swedenborg (book), Editor. ISBN 978-0854481682
- 2011 Blake's London: the Topographic Sublime, an essay by Iain Sinclair (book), Editor. ISBN 978-0854481705
- 2010 Heaven, Hell and Other Places (documentary), Executive Producer, ISBN 978-0854481736
- 2010 Fourteen Interventions (exhibition), Curator, London.
- 2010 Introducing the Mystic: an essay by Ralph Waldo Emerson (publication), Editor/author ISBN 978-0854481569
- 2010 Art lands on Alien Landscape (exhibition/catalogue), Margate.
- 2008 Dedecus: A Dictionary Pt, 2 (publication), Author. ISBN 978-0955547225
- 2008 Dedecus: A Dictionary Pt, 1 (publication), Author. ISBN 978-0955547218
- 2008 Maintenant, Pt, 1 (publication) Editor/Author. ISBN 978-0955547249
- 2007 Rub-a-dub-dub (three person exhibition with Jacob Cartwright and Nick Jordan) Switzerland.
- 2007 The Arms of Morpheus (book), Editor. ISBN 978-0854481507
- 2006 George Berkeley's Commonplace Book (book), Editor. ISBN 978-0955547201
- 2005 Vertigo Gallery (solo exhibition), London.
- 2005 Between Method and Madness (book), Editor. ISBN 978-0854481453
- 2004 in Search of the Absolute (book), Editor. ISBN 978-0854481415
- 2002 on the True Philosopher (book), Editor. ISBN 978-0854481347
- 2001 on the Translator and the Latin Text; essays by John Chadwick (book), Editor. ISBN 978-0854481316
- 1996 Bonnington Gallery, The Margaret Bryan Award, (two person exhibition with Lotte Hammer) Nottingham.
