= Des Hughes =

British artist (born 1970)

- Born: Des Hughes; 1970 (age 55–56)
- Education: Bath College of Art; Goldsmiths College
- Website: www.des-hughes.com

Des Hughes (born 1970) is a British artist who lives and works in London and Herefordshire.

He completed an MA in fine art at Goldsmiths College, London in 2002, following a BA in fine art at Bath College of Art in 1994.

He has guest curated an exhibition at Manchester Art Gallery and has been longlisted for the Fourth Plinth in Trafalgar Square, London.

== Exhibitions ==
Hughes' work has been the subject of major solo exhibitions both nationally and internationally including Laing Art Gallery, Newcastle upon Tyne (2005), Michael Benevento, Los Angeles (2008), Frieze Art Fair (2010), Nottingham Contemporary (2010), Ancient & Modern London (2012), Buchmann Galerie, Berlin (2013), Manchester Art Gallery (2013), The Henry Moore Foundation, Perry Green, UK (2014) and The Hepworth Wakefield, UK (2015-spring 2016).

Selected group shows include Bart Wells Institute, Hamish McKay, Wellington, New Zealand (2004), Art Out of Place, Castle Museum, Norwich (2005), Strange Weight, Martos Gallery, New York (2007), Strange Events Permit Themselves the Luxury of Occurring, Camden Arts Centre, London (2007), Art Now: Beating the Bourds, Tate Britain, London (2009), Never The Same River (Possible Futures, Probable Pasts), Camden Arts Centre, London, curated by Simon Starling (2010) and 'BigMinis, Fetishes of Crisis', curated by Alexi Vaillant, CAPC Musée d'art contemporain de Bordeaux (2010) Dystopia, CAPC, Musée d'art contemporain, Bordeaux (2011), Sometimes I wish I could just disappear', David Risley Gallery, Copenhagen (2011), The Sleepers, Clare Woods and Des Hughes, Pallant House, UK (2016)

== Collections ==
Hughes' work is held in many major collections including the Arts Council Collection, Whitworth Art Gallery and Manchester Art Gallery.
