= McNeilly =

McNeilly is a surname of Gaelic origin. Notable people with this surname include:

- A. J. W. McNeilly (1845–1911), Irish politician
- Andrew McNeilly (born 1972), Trinidad and Tobago Bobsledder
- Donnell McNeilly (born 2005), British footballer
- Gerry McNeilly, Canadian lawyer
- Gord McNeilly, Canadian politician
- Greg McNeilly, American political consultant
- Liam McNeilly (born 2006), British racing driver
- Mac McNeilly (born 1960), American rock musician
- Mildred Masterson McNeilly (1910–1997), American writer
- Robert McNeilly (born 1951), American police chief
- Stephen McNeilly (born 1968), British writer

== See also ==
- McNeilly station
- McNeill (surname)
