= Joshua Seigal =

English children's poet and comedian

- Born: London, England, U.K.
- Education: Goldsmiths, University of London
- Occupations: Children's poet, writer, stand-up comedian
- Writing career
- Notable work: I Don't Like Poetry (2016) Yapping Away (2021)
- Website: joshuaseigal.co.uk

Joshua Seigal is an English children's poet, author, stand-up comedian, and educator.

== Early life and education ==
Joshua Seigal grew up in London, during which time he regularly performed at the Poetry Café in Covent Garden. He earned a Master of Arts degree in Creative Writing and Education from Goldsmiths, University of London, where he studied under Michael Rosen. Prior to becoming a full-time writer and performer, Seigal spent time as a teaching assistant and a musician.

== Career ==
Seigal has published many collections of poetry for children, with publishers including Bloomsbury and HarperCollins, and has performed and led workshops at schools and festivals around the world. Seigal has won several awards, including the Laugh Out Loud Book Award and the People's Book Prize. He has written and performed for BBC Television and has appeared at the Edinburgh Festival Fringe on numerous occasions.

Seigal's poem 'I Don’t Like Poetry' (first published in his book of the same name) is featured on the website of the Poetry Foundation and is widely anthologised.

In 2023, Seigal performed his poem 'Just a Book' in front of Queen Camilla, on behalf of the Thomas Coram Foundation for Children charity. Seigal's poem involved audience participation, and he subsequently said of the experience: "It's very democratic, the actions, everyone has to do it, it doesn't matter who you are" whilst Camilla referred to Seigal's "charming poem".

He is also a stand-up comedian, and writes and performs poetry for adults. Examples of this work have been published in magazines such as Poetry Wales. In 2026, Seigal released his debut pamphlet, wryly entitled The Relationship Expert, as a free digital publication via the Internet Archive, under a Creative Commons license.

During the coronavirus pandemic, Seigal gave away many of his books online, stating: “This is an incredibly difficult, scary time. However, my job is based on sharing joy, and I am determined that I will keep doing this, in whatever form it takes.” Seigal maintains a website, where he continues to share much of his material.

Seigal is a mental health advocate and has suffered from anxiety.

== Awards ==
- Poetry Wales Award (2026) – Highly Commended
- UKLA Book Award (2025) – Longlisted
- Reading Rocks Book Award (2024) – Winner
- Laugh Out Loud Book Award (2023) – Winner
- Caterpillar Poetry Prize (2023) – Runner-Up
- The People's Book Prize (2022) – Winner
- Laugh Out Loud Book Award (2020) – Winner
- Laugh Out Loud Book Award (2017) – Shortlisted

== Books ==
=== for adults ===
- The Relationship Expert (Internet Archive, 2026)

=== for children ===
- I Tell Myself I'm Awesome (Bloomsbury, 2026) (illustrated by Chris Piascik)
- I Am (Collins, 2024) (illustrated by Evelline Andrya)
- Poetry Is Not for Me (Collins, 2023) (illustrated by Rebecca Burgess)
- Who Let the Words Out? (Bloomsbury, 2023) (illustrated by Chris Piascik)
- Yapping Away (Bloomsbury, 2021) (illustrated by Sarah Horne)
- Welcome to My Crazy Life (Bloomsbury, 2020) (illustrated by Chris Piascik)
- I Bet I Can Make You Laugh (Bloomsbury, 2018) (illustrated by Tim Wesson)
- Yuck and Yum (Troika, 2018) with Neal Zetter (illustrated by Scoular Anderson)
- Just Like Me! (Flying Eye Books, 2017) (illustrated by Amélie Faliere)
- Morris Wants More (Flying Eye Books, 2017) (illustrated by Amélie Faliere)
- Little Lemur Laughing (Bloomsbury, 2017) (illustrated by Chris Piascik)
- I Don't Like Poetry (Bloomsbury, 2016) (illustrated by Chris Piascik)

== See also ==
- List of British comedians
- List of children's literature writers
- List of English poets
- List of people associated with Goldsmiths, University of London
- List of people from London
- List of stand-up comedians
