= Strickson =

Strickson is a surname. Notable people with the surname include:

- Mark Strickson (born 1959), British TV producer and actor
- Rebecca Strickson (fl. from 2002), British illustrator and designer
