= Shay Kun =

Israeli-American painter (born 1974)

Shay Kun (Hebrew: שי קון; born 1974) is an Israeli-American painter known for post-modern interpretation of the Hudson River School movement. He is the son of Israeli painter Zeev Kun.

== Biography ==
Shay Kun was born in Tel Aviv, Israel, to Hungarian parents that survived the Holocaust, Ze'ev and Heddy Kun, both artists. Kun's first solo exhibition has been in Tel Aviv at age 18. He later studied at Bezalel Academy of Art and Design in Jerusalem (1998) and received his masters at Goldsmiths, University of London (2000). Since then, he has been living and working in New York City.

His works has been exhibited worldwide, including solo shows at Linda Warren projects in Chicago, Benrimon Contemporary in New York, Bill Lowe Gallery in Atlanta, Michael Schultz Gallery in Berlin, LaMontagne Gallery in Boston and at Hezi Cohen Gallery in Tel Aviv as well as numerous group shows, including at The 51st Venice Biennale, Shanghai Contemporary Art Museum, Untitled gallery in New York, Fortes Vilaca Gallery in São Paulo, Leslie Smith in Amsterdam, and at Lehmann Maupin Gallery, New York.

Kun infuses traditional Hudson River School images of nature, particularly Thomas Cole, Frederic Edwin Church and Albert Bierstadt. His painstaking attention to detail and composition of fantasy landscapes on canvas are updated with contemporary mass production Pop art motifs, out of scale and perspective. Kun's hyperreality and postmodernism style creates a jarring utopia. In that respect, he inherited The Holocaust influence on his parents' art. His mother paintings are utopian landscapes of an ideal world, while the paintings of his father, shows a dark world falling apart.

The New York Observer wrote: "Elements that he incorporates into his brilliantly colored, sometimes gaudy canvases including brittle, biscuit-tin landscapes of the sort mass-produced in factories in Taiwan...The show,'Exfoliations', is further proof, like Mark Ryden's recent show at Paul Kasmin, that the huge world of kitsch has become fair game for fine art".

== Selected solo exhibitions ==
- 2006 Melting Midlands, BUIA Gallery, New York
- 2007 Old Flames Don't Die Out They Build New Fires, Tavi Dresdner Gallery, Tel Aviv
- 2007 Perversion Is The Love We Feel When Others Feel Love. SEVENTEEN Gallery, London
- 2009 Opportunities multiply as they are seized. David Castillo Gallery, Miami
- 2010 Exfoliations, Benrimon Contemporary, New York
- 2010 Slack Tide, Lamontagne Gallery, Boston
- 2012 Domestic Sticky Wildlife, Martine Chaisson Gallery, New Orleans
- 2012 Be First, Be Smarter or Cheat, Benrimon Contemporary, New York
- 2013 An Extra, Hezi Cohen Gallery, Tel Aviv
- 2013 Feast and Famine. Linda Warren Gallery, Chicago
- 2014 Disambiguation. Bill Lowe Gallery, Atlanta
- 2014 Uproar. Michael Schultz Gallery, Berlin
- 2015 Nature Does Not Know Extinction Only Transformation, JBD Gallery, New York

== Selected group exhibitions ==
- 2001 Hi Falutin’, Hi Kickin’. VTO Gallery, London
- 2001 Egotripping, Anthony. Wilkinson Gallery, London
- 2001 Cream, Rosenfeld Gallery, Tel Aviv
- 2002 PoT, Joint Exhibition, Liverpool Biennale, Liverpool
- 2002 Artists Respond, Joint Exhibition, Somerville Museum of Art, Massachusetts
- 2003 Puppy Love, Pelham Art Center, Westchester County, New York
- 2004 Primo, BUIA Gallery, New York
- 2004 Feast or Famine: Artists and Food. DNA Gallery, Provincetown, Massachusetts
- 2004 Raid Projects. The Armory Show, New York
- 2005 Children of the Grave, The Agency Gallery, London
- 2005 Poles Apart / Poles Together, 51st Venice Biennale, Venice
- 2005 In the Ring, BUIA Gallery, New York
- 2006 Shifting Landscapes, Aftermodern Gallery, San Francisco
- 2006 Breezer, BUIA Gallery, New York
- 2007 ...A Landscape Show, Samson Projects, Boston
- 2007 Subreality, Aftermodern Gallery, San Francisco
- 2008 In Your Face, BUIA Gallery, New York
- 2008 Pole Shift, Project Gentili, Berlin
- 2008 Somewhere To Elsewhere, Linda Warren Gallery, Chicago
- 2008 Artfutures, Bloomberg Space, London
- 2009 Animamix, The Shanghai Contemporary Art Museum, Shanghai
- 2009 Golden Record: Sounds of Earth, The Collection, Lincoln, England
- 2009 Three Painters, BUIA Gallery, New York
- 2010 The Law of the Jungle, Lehmann Maupin Gallery, New York
- 2010 Interrupted Landscape, Champion Contemporary, Austin, Texas
- 2010 Generations, DNA Gallery, Provincetown, Massachusetts
- 2010 Fresh Apples, Hezi Cohen Gallery, Tel Aviv
- 2010 The Artist's Guide to the L.A. Galaxy, West Los Angeles College Art Gallery, Los Angeles
- 2011 Update your Reality, Alexander Ochs Galleries, Berlin
- 2012 Figuration Y?, Galerie Favardin & De Verneuil, Paris
- 2012 Good Intentions, Hezi Cohen Gallery, Tel Aviv
- 2013 Rothfeld Collection, American University Museum, Washington, D.C.
- 2013 PAN Amsterdam, Leslie Smith Gallery, Amsterdam
- 2013 I Love Shanghai, Art Labor Gallery, Shanghai
- 2013 Jew York, Untitled Gallery, New York
- 2013 100 Little Deaths, BravinLee programs, New York
- 2014 Contemporary Painting, University of Saint Francis, Fort Wayne, Indiana
- 2014 Cirrus, Dorfman Projects, New York
- 2014 Black and White, Lamontagne Gallery, Boston
