= Yvonne Ndege =

British international journalist

- Education: London School of Economics, Goldsmiths College
- Occupations: International Journalist & Media Professional
- Years active: 1999-Present

Yvonne Ndege is an international journalist, and media and communications professional. She started her career at the British Broadcasting Corporation, as a graduate trainee in London, United Kingdom.

== Early life ==
Ndege's parents emigrated to the UK from Kenya in the early 1970s. Her father was a journalist and mother a business owner. Ndege grew up and was educated at primary and secondary school level in London Borough of Bexley. She holds two degrees from the University of London's Goldsmiths College and London School of Economics.

== Career ==
Ndege's journalism career began at the British Broadcasting Corporation (BBC) as a 14 year old intern. After university she worked as a BBC graduate trainee, then landed her first job as a Researcher on BBC Panorama and worked her way up to become a Producer and Senior Producer on various news and current affairs programmes such as BBC Newsnight and on BBC Radio 4. Ndege was then talented spotted by BBC managers to be one of the corporation's on air faces. Ndege worked as an on-air Correspondent on BBC News, Breakfast, World and various other programmes covering the UK, Europe, and US in hard news and current affairs for close to 10 years. In 2007 she was headhunted by Al Jazeera English television to be one of the launch faces of the channel's East Africa bureau in Nairobi, Kenya. Less than two years later Ndege set up Al Jazeera's West Africa operation in Nigeria, where she led operations for over 7 years as Bureau Chief & Correspondent for the region. Ndege made her name as a journalist covering major stories such as the post election violence in Kenya. Ndege was the first international journalist to report on the Boko Haram Islamic extremist uprising in northern Nigeria Boko Haram, the Chibok schoolgirls kidnapping outrage in the country Chibok schoolgirls kidnapping and violence and oil pollution in Nigeria's oil rich Niger Delta region Conflict in the Niger Delta .

Ndege has delivered exclusive interviews with national leaders across Africa, including the Presidents and leaders of Nigeria, South Africa, Kenya and other nations. During her time at Al Jazeera Ndege reported from and anchored programmes from over 40 countries in Africa. In 2010, Ndege was a joint-recipient of the UN Correspondent's Association Prize for Journalism for her exclusive reports on the conflict in Democratic Republic of Congo.

In 2017 Ndege was headhunted to join the United Nations as Head of Communications & Spokesperson for UNHCR, the UN Refugee Agency in Nairobi, Kenya, where she is currently working and based. Ndege is also a media trainer, adviser, MC and moderator, for organisations such as the World Bank, IMF, African Development Bank, and African Union.
