= Clare Woods =

British painter

Clare Woods RA
- Born: 1972 (age 53–54); Southampton, UK
- Education: Bath College of Art; Goldsmiths College
- Website: www.clare-woods.com

Clare Woods RA is a British painter who lives and works in Hereford in the Welsh borders in the UK. Originally trained as a sculptor, Woods career as a painter spans 30 years. Painting initially with gloss paint, the artist now works predominantly with oil based paint on aluminium, and creates smaller works on paper. Woods is well known for her large scale abstracts landscapes, more recently exploring themes with reference to historical art practice, including flowers in the tradition of memento mori, and increasingly figurative subjects, including her first self-portrait.

Woods completed an MA in Fine Art at Goldsmiths College, London in 1999, following a BA in Fine Art at Bath College of Art in 1994.

== Collections ==
Woods’ paintings are held in many major national and international collections including the Arts Council Collection, London, British Council Collection, London, Southampton City Art Gallery, Amgueddfa Cymru - Museum Wales Collection, Arken Museum of Modern Art, Denmark, and the Albright-Knox Art Museum, Buffalo, US, also CCA Andratx, Mallorca in Spain, Serlachius Collection, Finland, University of Warwick, Mead Gallery, Towner Eastbourne and Tullie House in Carlisle.

== Exhibitions ==
Exhibition view of Clare Woods: Garden Without Seasons at Pitzhanger Manor & Gallery, London UK 2026

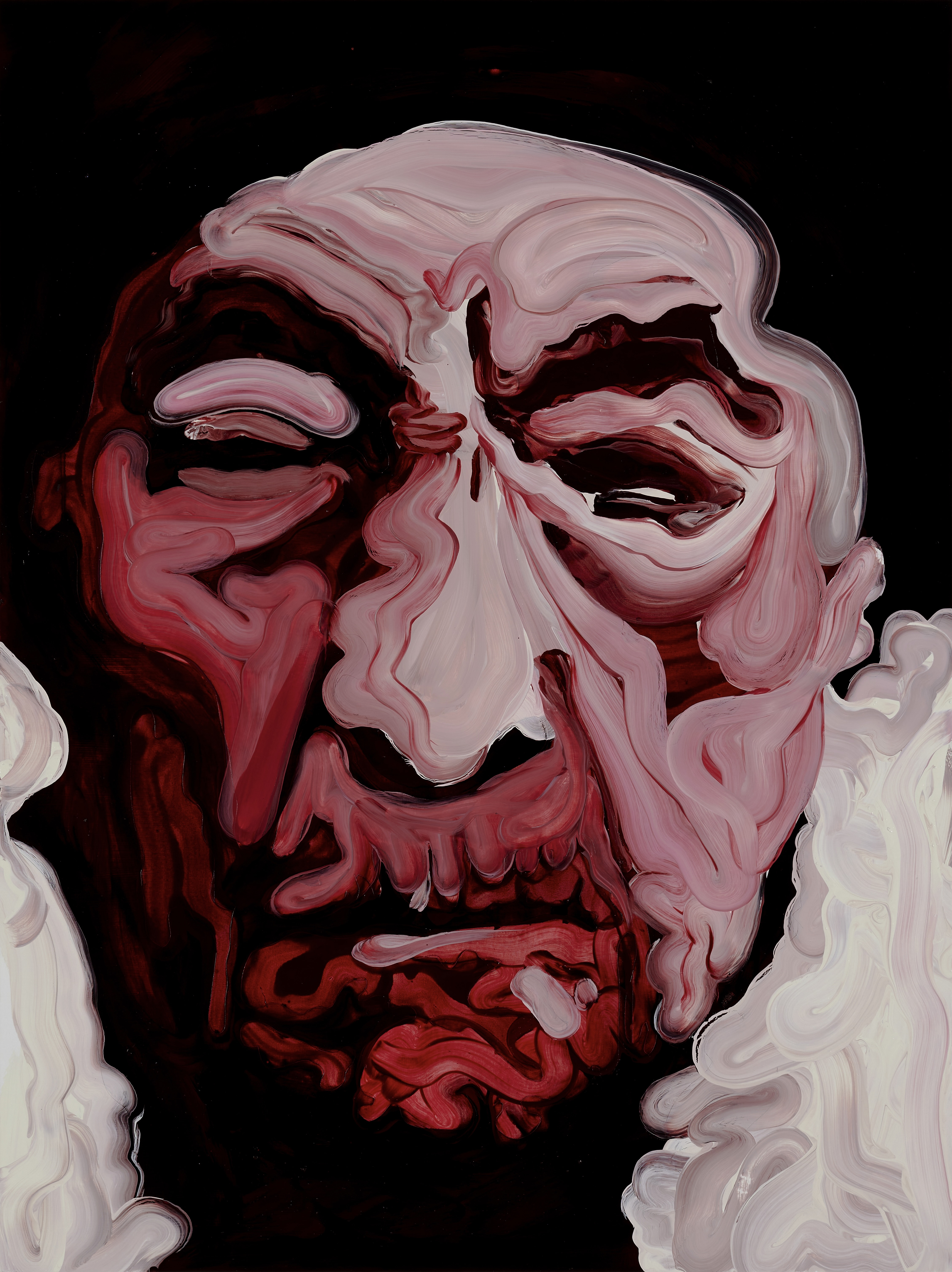
Clare Woods, Lou, 2023, Oil on aluminium, 80 x 60 cm

Woods’ work has been the subject of solo exhibitions including,

- Threads of Ascent, Garden Museum, London (2026)
- Garden Without Seasons, Pitzhanger Manor & Gallery, London (2026)
- Lines and Locating, Galerie Maximillian, Aspen (2025)
- A Kinder Time, Stephen Friedman Gallery, New York (2025)
- An Unwatched Voice, Martin Asbæk Gallery, Copenhagen (2025)
- Between Before and After, Norrtälje Kunsthal, Sweden (2024)
- I Blame Nature, Night Gallery, LA (2024)
- Soft Knock, Cristea Roberts Gallery, London (2024)
- Silent Spring, Buchmann Galerie, Berlin (2023)
- Still Here, Print display, Royal Academy of Arts, London (2023)
- Between Before and After, CCA Museum, Andratx, Spain (2023)
- Between These Words, Simon Lee Gallery, Hong Kong (2022)
- After Limbo, Night Gallery, LA (2022)
- Between Before and After, Serlachius Museum, Finland (2022)
- What Difference Does It Make, Martin Asbaek Gallery, Copenhagen (2021)
- The Great Unknown, Cristea Roberts Gallery, London (2021)
- If Not Now Then When, Buchmann Galerie, Berlin (2020)
- Doublethink, Simon Lee Gallery, London (2019)
- Solo Presentation at The Dallas Art fair, Dallas, USA (2019)
- Password Revolt, Simon Lee Gallery, New York, USA (2018)
- English Habits, Martin Asbaek Gallery, Copenhagen (2018)
- Rehumanised, Simon Lee Gallery, Hong Kong (2018)
- Reality Dimmed, Mead Gallery, Warwick Arts Centre, Coventry (2018)
- Victim of Geography, Dundee Contemporary Arts, Scotland, UK (2017)
- Lady Midnight, Pallant House, stair commission (2016)
- Clean Heart, A Landscape Retrospective, Hestercombe Gallery (2016)
- The Sleepers, Pallant House Gallery, joint show with Des Hughes (2016)
- A Tree A Rock A Cloud, (On tour) Oriel Plas Glyn-y-Weddw, Wales (2015)
- The Drama Triangle, Martin Asbaek Gallery, Copenhagen (2015)
- A Tree A Rock A Cloud, Oriel Plas Glyn-y-Weddw, Wales (2014)
- Hanging Hollow and Holes, Buchmann Galerie, Berlin (2014)
- New Works, Rebecca Camhi Gallery, Athens (2014)
- New Works, Martin Asbaek Gallery, Copenhagen (2013)
- Eva Rothschild / Clare Woods, New Works, The New Art Centre, Salisbury (2013)
- Dark Matter, Southampton City Art Gallery, Southampton (2012)
- The Bad Neighbour, Modern Art, London (2012)
- Dark Matter, Martin Asbaek Gallery, Copenhagen (2012)
- Carpenter's Curve and Brick Fields, permanent commissions for London 2012 Olympic Park (2011–2012)
- The Unquiet Head, The Hepworth Wakefield, UK (2011)
- Watercolours, Buchmann Galerie, Berlin (2009)
- The Prospect, The New Art Centre, Salisbury (2008)
- Monster Field, Stuart Shave / Modern Art, London (2008)
- The Dancing Mania, Buchmann Galerie, Berlin (2008)
- Deaf Man's House, The Chisenhale Gallery, lONDON (2006)
- The Walls Have Eyes, Eva Rothschild / Clare Woods, Modern Art, London, (2003)
- New Paintings, Southampton City Art Gallery, Southampton (1997)

== Commissions ==
Woods received a major commission from Contemporary Art Society/ Olympic Delivery Authority to create two permanent pieces of work, Carpenter's Curve and Brick Field, for the Olympic Park, London in 2012.

Other major commissions include, Future City/Make Architects commission for a building, London (2005–07), Transport for London, Permanent Commission for Hampstead Heath Train Station London (2010–11), Worcester University/ Worcester County Council, Large Scale painting for the new Hive building (2012) Art on the Underground, River Services commission two new paintings for a poster commission (2014), Large Scale Painting Commission, VIA University College, Denmark (2015) and wallpaper commission for the UCLH NHS Trust (2019). Woods most recent commission was a site-specific work title River Bend in Dallas USA (2019).

Woods also works in print and has had print commissions from Habitat, Counter Editions, Sidney Nolan Trust / The Hepworth Wakefield, Edition Copenhagen, Harewood House and Cristea Roberts Gallery, London. In 2014 Woods produced a poster design, Cranky, part of a series commissioned by Art on the Underground for London River Services.
