= Rebecca Strickson =

- Education: Goldsmiths, University of London
- Occupation: designer

Rebecca Strickson is an illustrator and designer. Previously from Grantham, she is now based in Margate, Kent. Strickson was selected to appear in the AOI’s Images 36 Best of British Illustration book in 2012, and was shortlisted twice for the AOI Illustration Awards. She was also a member of the all-woman choir Gaggle from inception until 2014.

== Education ==
Strickson attended Kesteven and Grantham Girls' School, before going on to study Fine Art and History of Art at Goldsmiths, University of London (2002).

== Illustration and design ==
Strickson works across a range of different media. She was the only woman artist included in the Phantasmagoria group show at Forman's Smokehouse Gallery in London in 2012. ELLE magazine, Columbia Records, Agent Provocateur, Kenco, O2 (UK), Artsy, the Garden Museum and Channel 4 have all commissioned her work.

Building on her commission to create a pack of tarot cards for Agent Provocateur, Strickson created an intricately patterned typeface that draws on Renaissance, medieval and Celtic imagery.

Strickson has designed a series of special stamps for the Royal Mail, depicting life in Ancient Britain, that was released on 17 January 2017.

Strickson has drawn parts of the comic book series Metroland, written by Ricky Miller and illustrated by Julia Scheele, and published by Avery Hill Publishing.

Strickson is signed to the Design and Animation division of RSA Films, part of Ridley Scott Associates.

== Other activities ==
Strickson was a member of all-girl alternative choir Gaggle from inception to 2014.

Strickson is interested in artists' rights management, and is signed up to a collective licensing service for visual artists, known as Payback, launched by the Design and Artists Copyright Society.

On the impact that new digital display formats like packshots have made on album artwork, Strickson comments:

"Packshots have really made an impact – 1500px squared work is not just shrinking down your album artwork, it's an entirely different way of communicating your visual ideas across. You need different designs, colours, fonts. You have to grab attention with a lot less to deal with and it can really sucks sometimes. But then we're all in an age of commodification and faster, quicker, more – so it's not worth fighting it when you can turn to your round to your advantage with creativity."

— Rebecca Strickson, CreativeBloq
