= Rachel Aldred =

British academic specialising in active mobility

- Born: June 1976
- Education: Goldsmiths, University of London; University of Manchester
- Awards: ESRC Outstanding Impact in Public Policy Prize; Westminster University Price for Research Excellence
- Scientific career
- Fields: Transportation planning and management
- Institutions: University of Westminster (2012–); University of East London (2007–2012)
- Website: http://rachelaldred.org

Rachel Aldred (born 1976) is a British academic specialising in active mobility. She is a Professor in Transport at the University of Westminster and has published over 25 peer-reviewed papers. She was awarded the Economic and Social Research Council's award for Outstanding Impact in Public Policy (2016) for her work on The Near Miss Project, the first UK study calculating a per-mile collision risk for cycling, and is one of the co-investigators of the Propensity to Cycle Tool, an online system for transport planners using census data to model the potential benefits of cycling infrastructure schemes in England, funded by the Department for Transport. Aldred presented to the Transport Select Committee in 2018 as an expert witness during the enquiry into active travel.

== Early life and education ==
Aldred studied BA Sociology and Social Policy at the University of Manchester, receiving a first class honours degree, and completed her PhD in Sociology (Doctor of Psychology) at Goldsmiths, University of London. She was the senior lecturer in sociology at the University of East London from 2007 to 2012 when she joined the University of Westminster as the Senior Lecturer in Transport and Course Leader of the MSc Transport Planning and Management programme.

== Career ==
In 2014 Aldred was part of the team awarded a grant from the Creative Exchange (AHRC) for the Near-Miss project, which looked at over 5000 near-misses reported by over 1500 individuals. The study was the first to calculate a per-mile rate for cycling near misses within the UK and in conclusion found that gender had affected how frequently people experiences near misses, with women experiencing a significantly greater number of near-miss incidents than men.

Aldred's work on the Near-Miss project resulted in her being named 'one of the most influential people in transport' in the Evening Standard's Progress 100 Award in 2016, one of Bike Biz's 100 Women of the Year 2015 and the project was named Cycling Initiative of the Year 2015 by Total Women's Cycling.

Since 2015, she has worked as a co-investigator on the Propensity to Cycle tool team and as a researcher on projects looking at cycling and active travel as a matter of social justice, including a co-authoring a report into how transport planning accounts for disabled cyclists in London and leading the impact evaluation of the Mini-Holland active travel schemes in London.

Her 2017 study into inequalities in self-report road injury risk in London was the first to use National Travel Survey data to analyse risk for those walking, finding that disabled and low-income pedestrians were far more likely to injured. In 2018 the new schools layer of the Propensity to Cycle tool calculated that children in England would be twenty times more likely to cycle to school with better transport planning.

Between 2012 and 2018 she was an elected trustee of the London Cycling Campaign and in 2016 was awarded the Economic and Social Research Council (ERSC) award for outstanding impact in public policy. She is a trustee of the Road Safety Trust and was a guest speaker on an episode of Ed Miliband's Reasons to be Cheerful podcast.

== Selected works ==
=== Book chapters ===
- Aldred, R. (2016) Stakeholders, Politics and the Media In Edward Elgar Handbook of Transport and Urban Planning in the Developed World, edited by Michiel C.J. Bliemer, Corinne Mulley and Claudine Moutou.
- Aldred, R. The New Mobilities Paradigm and Sustainable Transport: Finding Synergies and Creating New Methods. In Routledge International Handbook of Social and Environmental Change, ed. Lockie et al. (2014).
- Aldred, R. The Commute, in Routledge Handbook of Mobilities, ed. Peter Adey et al. (2013).
- Aldred, R. The role of advocacy and activism in shaping cycling policy and politics, Cycling and Sustainability (Emerald, Bingley, 2012, ed. John Parkin).

=== Reports ===
- Road Injuries in the National Travel Survey: Under-reporting and Inequalities in Injury Risk (2018)
- The Near Miss Project: First Year Report (2015)
- Benefits of Investing in Cycling for British Cycling (2014)
- Gobuff, L. & Aldred. R. Cycling Policy in the UK: a historical and thematic overview (2011) (London: University of East London)
