= List of member institutions of the University of London =

Federation of colleges and universities

Member institutions of the University of London are colleges and universities that are members of the federal University of London.

The University of London was initially configured as an examining board for affiliated colleges, but was reconfigured as a teaching university for London, with many London colleges becoming schools of the university, in 1900. Since the 1990s it has trended towards much greater autonomy for its colleges. Common assessment standards by subject no longer exist across the university nor is shared teaching or cross-registration commonplace.

== List of member institutions ==
The member institutions of the University of London are currently divided as follows, in alphabetical order:

=== Colleges ===
Arms	University	Established	Joined University of London	Total students (2024/25)	Notes
	Birkbeck, University of London	1823	1920	7,720	A university in its own right since 2023, with degree awarding powers since 2012.
	Brunel University of London	1798	2024	12,705	A university since 1966, became a member institution of the University of London in 2024.
	City St George's, University of London	1834	2016	27,230	Formed in 2024 by merger of City, University of London and St George's, University of London. City became a member institution of the University of London in 2016, and became a university in its own right again in 2023.
None	Royal Central School of Speech and Drama	1906	2005	1,015	Degree awarding powers since 2005.
None	Courtauld Institute of Art	1932	2002	630	
	Goldsmiths, University of London	1891	1905	7,910	Became an institution owned by the university in 1905 and a school of the university in 1988. A university in its own right since 2024, with degree awarding powers since 2013.
None	Institute of Cancer Research	1909	2003	370	
	King's College London	1829	1900	40,870	Along with University College London, one of the two colleges named in the 1836 charter as having the right to submit students for examination and an original school of the university in 1900. Since 2023 a university in its own right.
None	London Business School	1964	1964	2,275	
	London School of Economics	1895	1900	12,950	Original school of the university in 1900. Since 2023 a university in its own right.
None	London School of Hygiene & Tropical Medicine	1899	1900	945	Original school of the university in 1900. Degree awarding powers since 2013. Approved for university status and applying for supplemental charter in 2024/5.
	Queen Mary University of London	1785	1907	24,640	A university in its own right since 2023, which awarded its own degrees since 2014.
	Royal Academy of Music	1822	1999	775	Degree awarding powers since 2012.
	Royal Holloway, University of London	1879	1900	13,115	Original school of the university in 1900. Since 2022 a university in its own right.
	Royal Veterinary College	1791	1949	2,575	A university in its own right since 2023, with degree awarding powers since 2009.
	SOAS University of London	1916	1916	6,400	A university in its own right since 2023, with degree awarding powers since 2013.
None	University College London	1826	1900	51,315	Along with King's College London, one of the two colleges named in the 1836 charter as having the right to submit students for examination and an original school of the university in 1900. A university in its own right since 2023, with degree awarding powers since 2005.

=== Former colleges ===
- Bedford College [entered in 1900; merged with Royal Holloway College in 1985]
- Chelsea College [entered in 1966; merged with King's College in 1985]
- City, University of London [affiliated in 2016; merged into City St George's in 2024]
- Hackney College [entered 1900; merged with New College London in 1924]
- Heythrop College, University of London [entered in 1971; closed in 2018]
- Imperial College London [entered in 1908; left the University of London in 2007]
- Institute of Archaeology [established in 1937; merged into UCL in 1986]
- Institute of Education [merged into UCL in 2014]
- London School of Medicine for Women [merged into UCL in 1998]
- New College London [entered in 1900; closed in 1966]
- Queen Elizabeth College [entered in 1956; merged with King's College in 1985]
- Regent's Park College [entered in 1901; moved to Oxford in 1927; permanent private hall of University of Oxford from 1957]
- Richmond Theological College [entered in 1902; closed in 1972]
- St George's, University of London [affiliated in the 19th century; merged into City St George's in 2024]
- School of Pharmacy, University of London [entered in 1949; merged into UCL in 2012]
- School of Slavonic and East European Studies [entered in 1932; merged into UCL in 1999]
- Westfield College [merged with Queen Mary College in 1989]
- Wye College [entered in 1900; merged into Imperial College in 2000]

== History ==
The institutions that make up the university of London have been referred to by a number of different terms historically. From federation in 1900 until the passing of the University of London Act 1994 they were formally "schools of the university" or (until 1978) "colleges incorporated into the university", from 1994 until the passing of the University of London Act 2018 they were "colleges", and from 2018 they have been "member institutions". A member institution is defined in the 2018 act as "an educational, academic or research institution which is a constituent member of the University and has for the time being — (a) the status of a college under the statutes; or (b) the status of a university". This had the effect of allowing institutions to change their status from colleges to universities in their own right while still remaining part of the University of London. These institutions, including the London School of Economics and University College London, achieved university status in their own right within the University of London in 2022 and 2023.

Students from University of London colleges who wish to take a course at another college within the collegiate public university as part of their degree can register as intercollegiate students.

Until the year 2008, all colleges within the federal collegiate system solely awarded a University of London degree. From 2003 onwards some colleges received their own degree-awarding powers. However, these were held in abeyance until 2008, when a number of colleges began to award their own degrees.

== Gallery ==
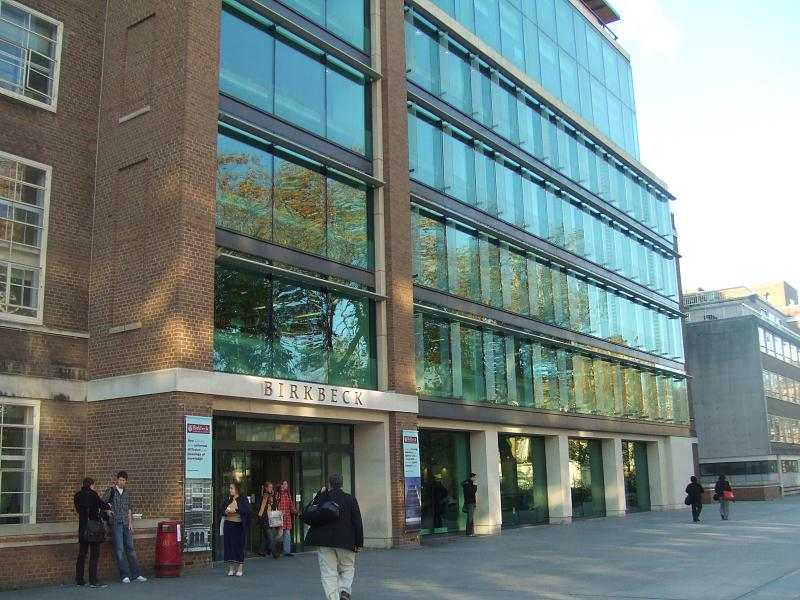
Birkbeck

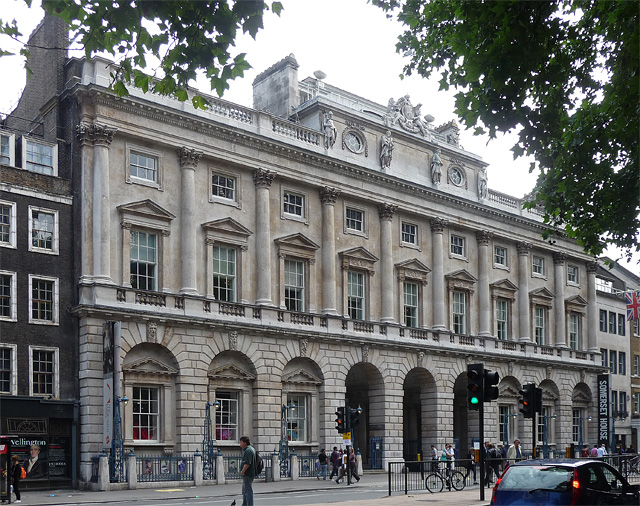
Courtauld Institute of Art

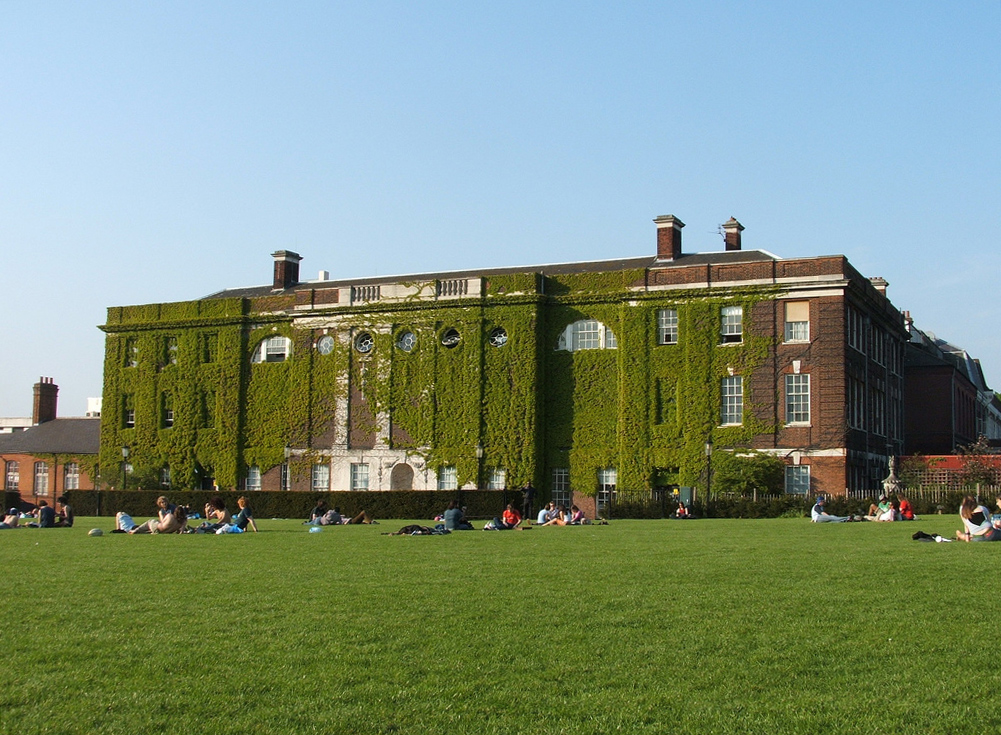
Goldsmiths

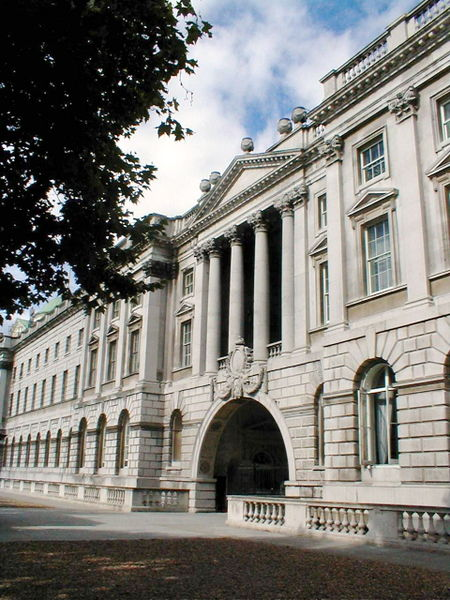
King's College London

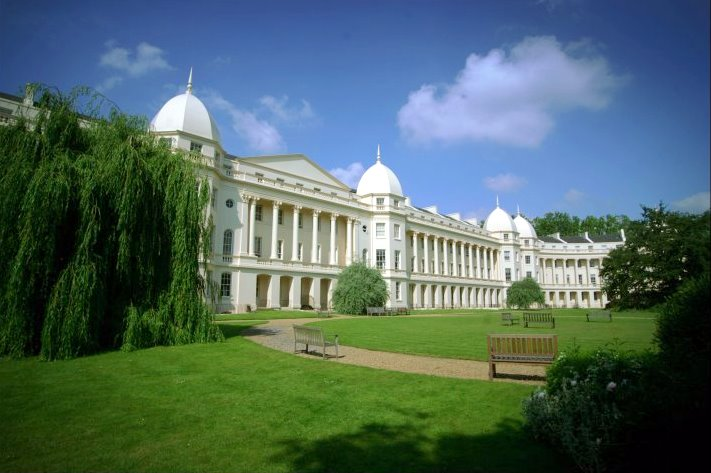
London Business School

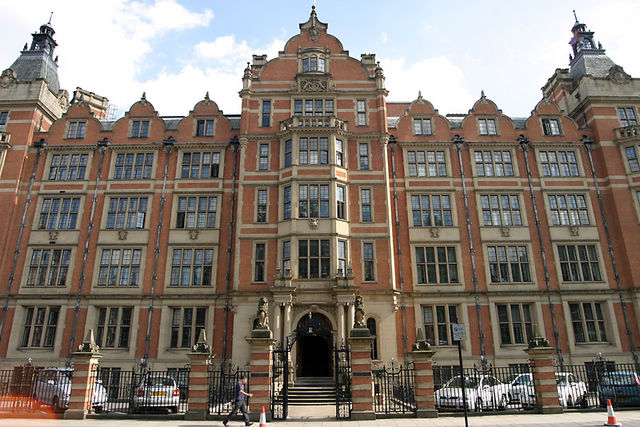
London School of Economics and Political Science
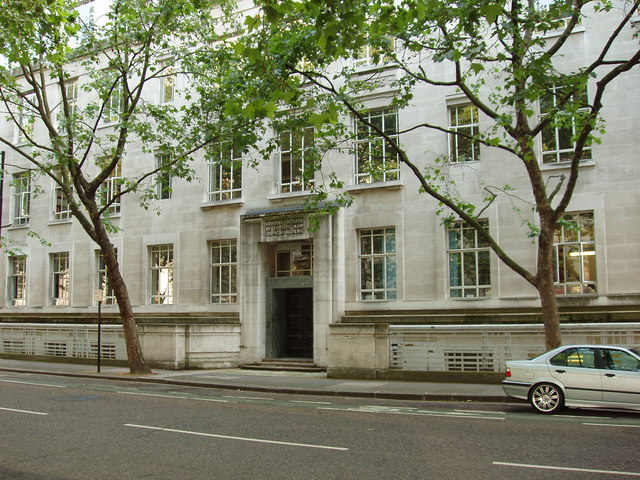
London School of Hygiene and Tropical Medicine

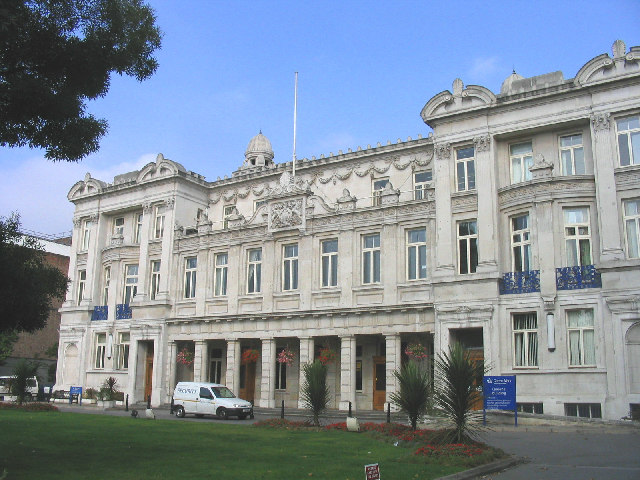
Queen Mary

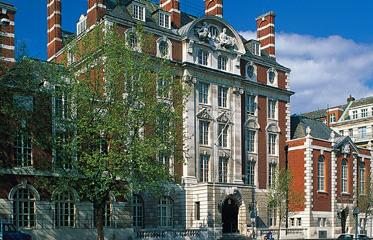
Royal Academy of Music

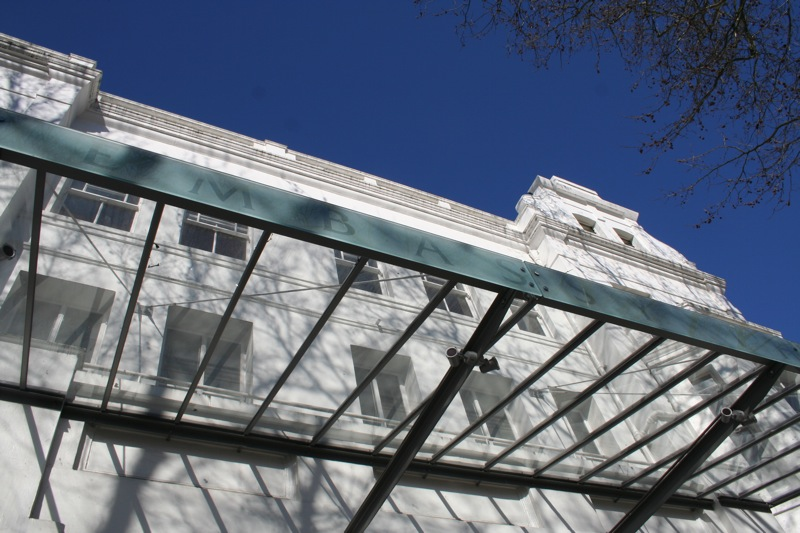
Royal Central School of Speech and Drama

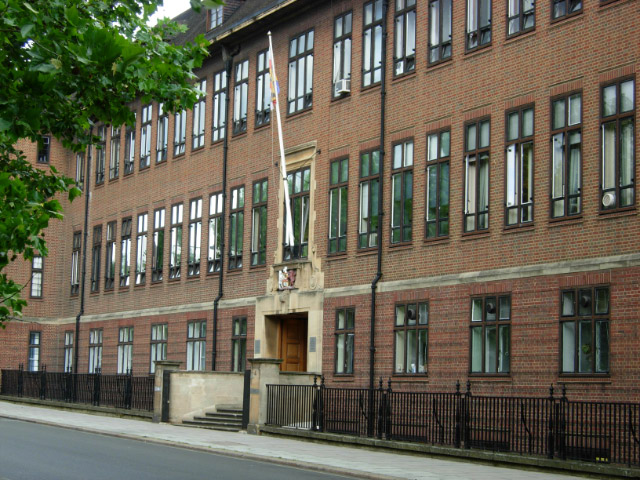
Royal Veterinary College

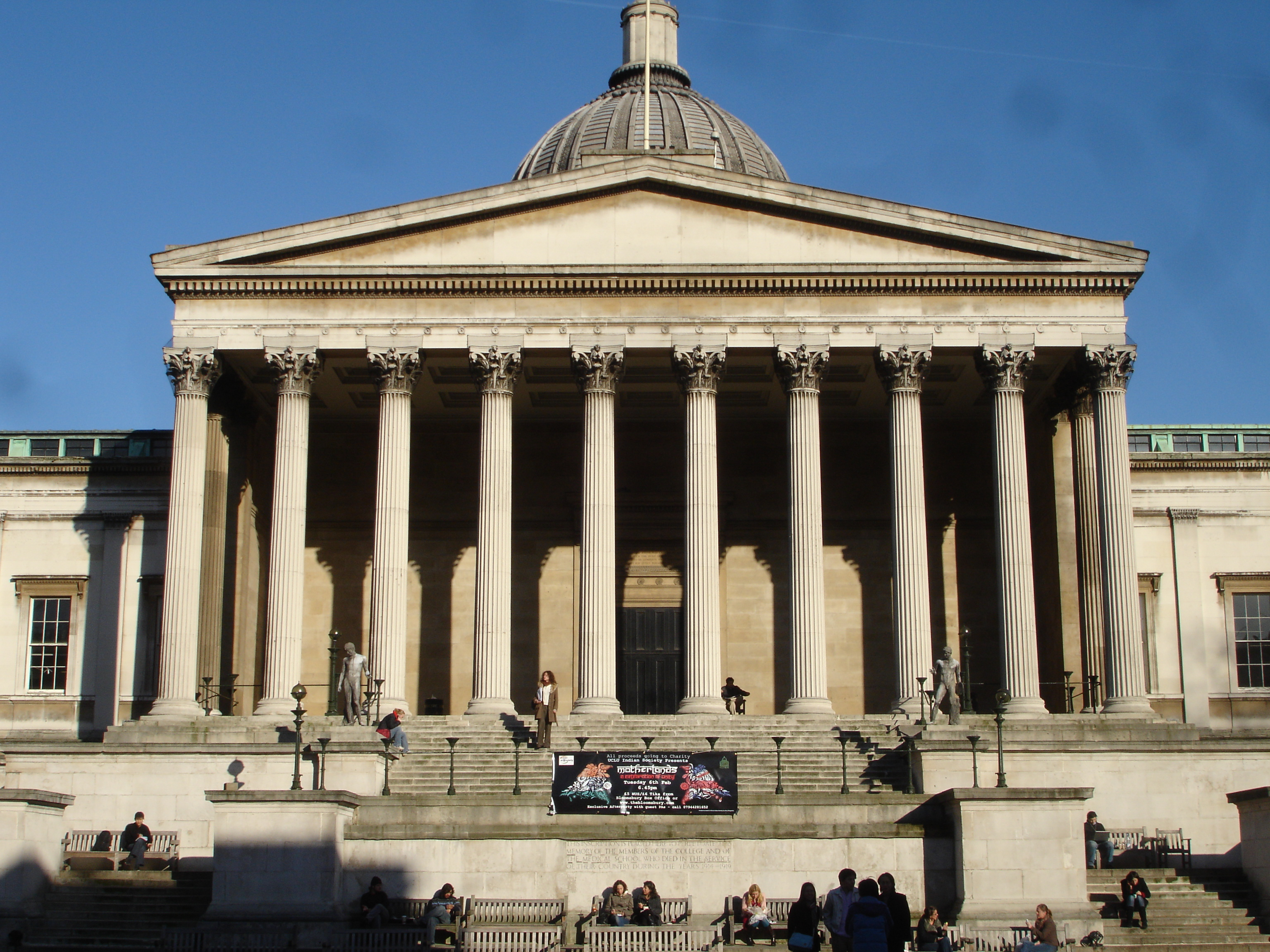
University College London
