= Stephen Robson (artist) =

British artist and printmaker (born 1956)

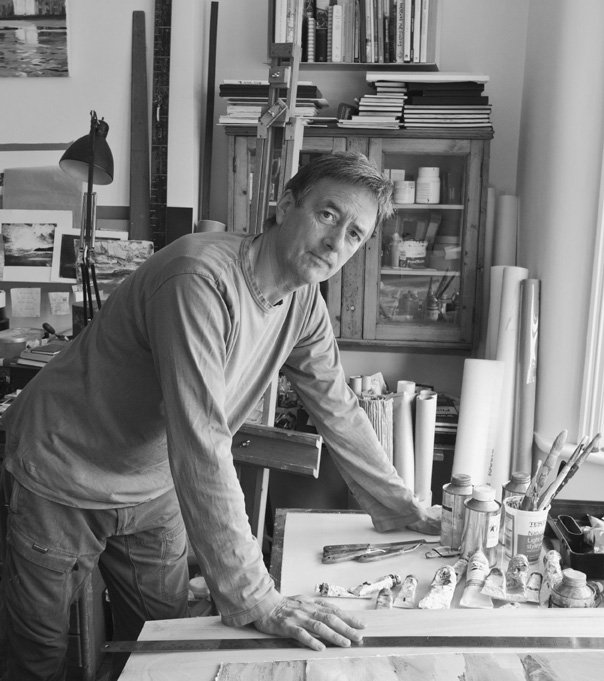
- Born: Stephen John Edward Robson; 19 June 1956 (age 69); Cambridgeshire, England
- Education: University of London
- Known for: Printmaking, Drawing, Photography, Painting
- Website: www.stephenrobson.co.uk

Stephen Robson is a British artist and printmaker.

== Life and career ==
Stephen Robson was born in Cambridgeshire, England on 19 June 1956, where he lived until he went to study fine art at Goldsmiths College. After a successful career in photography, Stephen returned to drawing and printmaking, and studied printmaking. He is best known for his abstract depictions of English landscapes.
