= The Last Girl =

2003 novel by Stephan Collishaw

- First edition
- Author: Stephan Collishaw
- Language: English
- Genre: Fiction; Historical fiction
- Publisher: Sceptre
- Publication date: March 2003 (UK)
- Publication place: United Kingdom
- Media type: Print (Hardcover and paperback)
- Pages: 310
- ISBN: 0-340-82692-4

The Last Girl is the first novel of English author Stephan Collishaw. It tells the story of an elderly poet living in Vilnius in the 1990s, who is troubled by a guilty secret from his youth. The novel is set partly in 1990s Vilnius and partly in war time Wilno and deals with the holocaust in Lithuania.

== Plot ==
=== Jolanta, mid-1990s ===
Steponas Daumantas, an elderly poet, walks the streets of Vilnius photographing young women with their babies. He becomes obsessed with one particular woman, Jolanta, and strikes up a friendship with her. Jolanta gives him a manuscript that her husband has written, and Daumantas promises to look at it and possibly show his publisher, but loses it when he gets drunk. As his friendship with the young woman deepens he can no longer hold back the memories that have been bubbling up for years.

=== Svetlana, mid-1990s ===
Svetlana is an ethnic Russian living in poverty in the back streets of Vilnius's Old Town. She does bits of washing for Daumantas and, when she encounters him drunk one night, saves a manuscript he leaves behind. Svetlana struggles to earn some money to send her son to England to work, while trying to survive with her brutal husband Ivan. She befriends a young prostitute, Ruta, and has memories of her own she does not wish to recall.

=== Rachael, Poland 1938 ===
Daumantas grows up in a small village close to Wilno and has early ambitions of being a poet. He falls in love with a local Jewish girl, Rachael. When Rachael rejects him he goes to university in Wilno. Some years later he sees Rachael again on the streets of Wilno with her Jewish husband. In 1939 the Communists invade Poland and hand back Wilno to the Lithuanians. Lithuanian thugs roam the streets; but that is nothing compared to what happens when the Germans invade. As the life is slowly choked from the Jewish population in the Vilna Ghetto Rachael makes a desperate demand of Daumantas: take her child and save it.

== Critical reception ==
The Last Girl was critically acclaimed, being named by Alan Sillitoe in The Independent as one of his books of the year; "Wonderful ... that rare novel which no-one, having once read, will be able to forget". Julie Myerson wrote in The Guardian, "astoundingly complex for a first novel ... [it] successfully encompasses passion, morality, history and art." Publishers Weekly called it "an absorbing debut". The Lithuanian Quarterly Journal of Arts and Sciences, Booklist, and The Washington Times also reviewed the book.
