= Zeev Kun =

Hungarian-born Israeli painter (1930–2024)

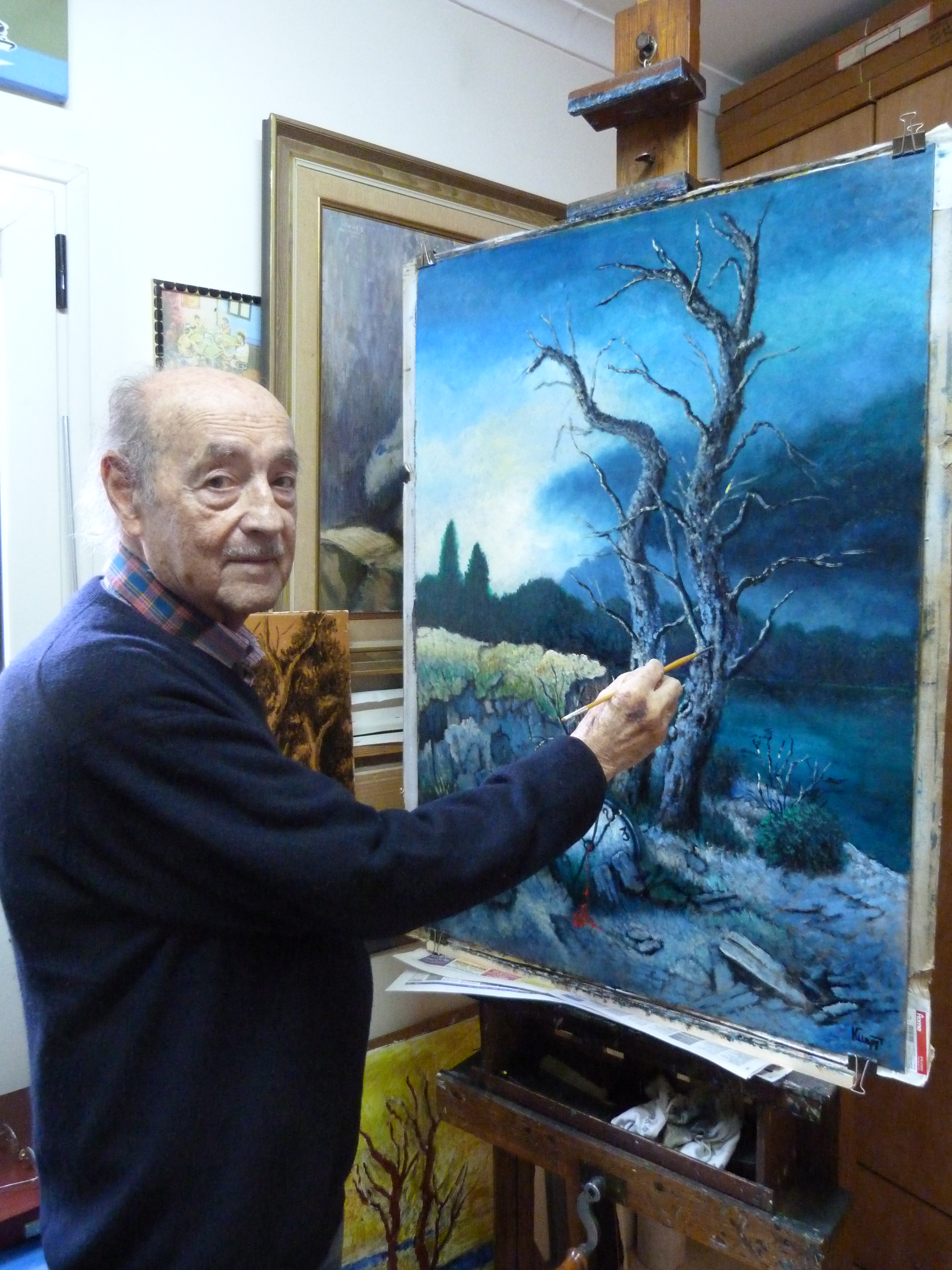
Zeev Kun (2015)

Zeev Kun (Hebrew: זאב קון; 16 April 1930 – 20 June 2024) was an Israeli painter of Hungarian origin. He is the father of the artist Shay Kun.

== Life ==
Zeev Kun was born in the city of Nyíregyháza in northeastern Hungary. As a teenager, he worked at an art supply store owned by his parents, Blanka and Sandor. After the deportation of Hungarian Jews began in March–April 1944, 14-year-old Zeev Kun was first sent to Auschwitz concentration camp, then to Jaworzno concentration camp, located 23 kilometers away from Auschwitz and used as its outer branch, and from January to April 1945 he was imprisoned at the camps of Gross-Rosen, Buchenwald and Flossenbürg; on 23 April 1945, the prisoners of the camp Flossenbürg were freed by American troops. In late August 1945, Zeev Kun came back to Hungary, and with the Auschwitz concentration camp tattoo still visible on his arm, he resumed school. Later, he entered the Magyar Képzőművészeti Főiskola in Budapest (nowadays called Hungarian University of Fine Arts) in the fall of 1947, where he studied for over a year and a half. In 1949, as the new pro-communist political regime was growing more and more repressive, Zeev Kun joined a group of thirty Jews from the leftist Zionist organization "Hashomer Hatzair" and managed to secretly cross the Czech border, and later he arrived to Italy via Austria. In the city of Bari, the group boarded a ship that brought them to Israel.

Once in Israel, Zeev Kun first settled at the kibbutz Givat-Haim near Hadera. He did not stay there for long, though, as in 1951 he became a student at the Akademie der bildenden Künste Wien Academy of Fine Arts in Vienna, as the city had just witnessed the birth of the so-called Vienna School of Fantastic Realism. Students and young professors of the academy sought to reflect upon the tragedy of World War II, still maintaining a dialog with the masters of German Renaissance (such as Hieronymus Bosch and Pieter Bruegel the Elder), as well as the pioneers of surrealism of 1920s and 1930s, first of all Max Ernst (1891–1976). At the academy, Zeev Kun was close to Anton Lehmden (born in 1929) and Ernst Fuchs (1930–2015). In his art, the latter focused on the images of Apocalypse, creating paintings shot through with dread and fear of death. It is no wonder that Zeev Kun, who himself survived the nightmare of Auschwitz and Buchenwald, was so overwhelmed by the works of Fuchs, who happened to be his peer. Upon his return to Israel, Zeev Kun joined the Israeli Painters and Sculptors Association. In 1973 he was awarded the Max Nordau Prize for Arts and in 2023 – the Moshe Castel Prize for the outstanding contribution to the Israeli art. His paintings have gained acclaim from art lovers in the Israeli non-Jewish sector, as well; they have been sold by their Alkara Art Gallery in Daliyat al-Karmel, Israel's largest Druze town. Kun died on 20 June 2024, at the age of 94.

== Exhibitions and works ==
His perfectly mastered technique allowed him to accomplish a wide range of artistic goals, as he came up with philosophic and allegoric interpretations of the Holocaust and its ever-present memory, never to be overshadowed by the Jewish national revival in Israel and in a number of countries hosting Jewish diasporas. He exhibited in many Israeli cities (e.g. Jerusalem, 1954, Tel Aviv, 1959, 1961, 1963, 1964, 1968, 2014), and Nahariya (1988), as well as in Brussels (1960), Paris (1962, 1972, 1994), London (1965), Sydney (1967), New York City (1968), Los Angeles (1968), Detroit (1970), Amsterdam (1972), Stockholm (1975), Antwerp (1976) and Berlin (1987). For many years, the painter worked in Safed, where he held his own gallery, but later he returned to Tel Aviv, where he lived until his death.

Zeev Kun's works have been successfully sold by leading Israeli auction houses on many occasions, including "Tiroche", "Matsart", "Montefiore", "Egozi" and others. According to art critic professor G.Recanat, Zeev Kun's paintings have always been highly appreciated and valued by art collectors and art lovers.
