= Stephan Collishaw =

- Born: Stephan Collishaw; 1968 (age 57–58); Nottingham, England
- Occupations: Author, teacher
- Writing career
- Genre: Historical Fiction
- Notable works: The Last Girl; Amber; The Song of the Stork; A Child Called Happiness

Stephan Collishaw is an author from Nottinghamshire.

Collishaw was born at Nottingham City Hospital. He studied at Goldsmiths, University of London, where he wrote several other substantial unpublished works, and based on an interest in history and literature, decided to become a teacher in 1991. On a whim, he relocated to Vilnius in 1995, where he met and married a Lithuanian woman named Marija, who had been teaching him Lithuanian. Marija already had two daughters: Kristina and Gabriele. The family lived in Palma de Mallorca for two years, where Marija gave birth to Collishaw's son Lukas, and then the family relocated to Nottinghamshire in 1999. By this time, he had written a total of three unpublished novels, and at his wife's urging, began taking his writing more seriously and took an MA in creative writing at Nottingham Trent University.

His first novel, The Last Girl, about an elderly and impoverished poet in Vilnius, was completed in 2001 and published in 2003. In a favourable review for The Guardian, Julie Myerson described it as "astoundingly complex for a first novel", and also commented favourably on the reserved and un-flashy tone of Collishaw's prose. He followed with a second novel, Amber, in 2004. Also set in Vilnius, it was inspired in part by (and contained numerous references to) Christopher Marlowe's play Tamburlaine, which had been a favorite of Collishaw's as a young man.

Collishaw's third novel, The Song of the Stork was published by Legend Press. The Song of the Stork is set in Lithuania during the Second World War and tells the story of the brittle, unlikely relationship between a 15-year-old girl, Yael, and the mute outcast Aleksei against the background of the Jewish partisan resistance. The novel is a love story and a coming-of-age tale. It is about a young woman finding her voice as around her the voices of her community are extinguished.

In 2018 Legend Press published Collishaw's fourth novel, A Child Called Happiness. Rosie Garthwaite wrote that it was, 'An incredibly timely book about the human upheaval in all its emotional forms', whilst Celeste Hicks wrote that 'Collishaw's characters are delicately created and endearingly human'. Set in Zimbabwe, the story explores two stories of struggle over a farm in the Bindura valley. In 2010 a young British girl goes to stay with her uncle on his family farm as tensions with the local authorities and the War Veterans reach boiling point. 115 years earlier, village chief Tafara struggles to keep control of his land as white settlers move into the area. Collishaw 'Deftly weaves together two stories set in different periods of Zimbabwe's history, always taking the reader with him. The vexed issue of land in Zimbabwe and who it belongs to is the common thread. Collishaw creates atmosphere and a sense of place, bringing to life the characters, the history and the politics' Mary Harper.

Stephan also edited Any Place But Home which contains personal histories of seven Lithuanians who settled in England's East Midlands in the 1940s.

His brother is Mat Collishaw the artist.
