= Nick Jordan (artist) =

British artist (born 1967)

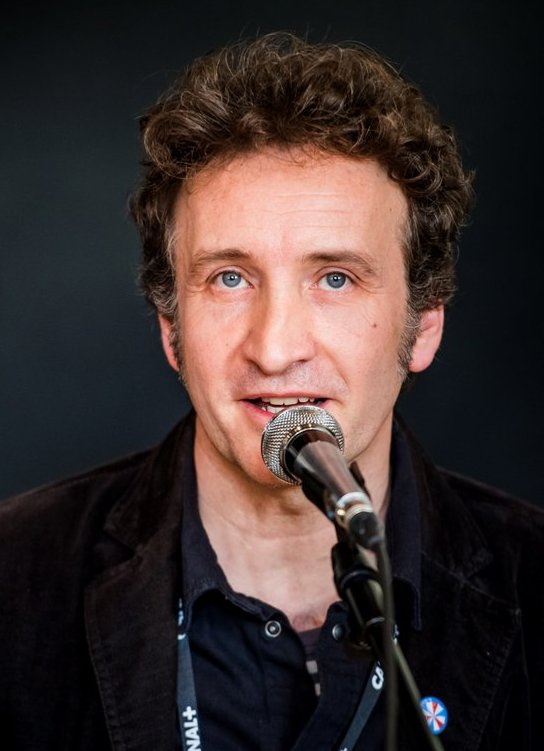
- Jordan in 2017
- Born: 28 July 1967 (age 59); Chigwell, Essex, England
- Education: Manchester Metropolitan University; Nottingham Trent University
- Occupation: Artist
- Website: nickjordan.info

Nick Jordan (born 1967) is a British visual artist and experimental filmmaker based in Manchester, UK. The artist's work explores connections between social, cultural, and natural ecologies.

Jordan's documentaries feature practitioners working in life sciences, such as ecology and botany, as well as from the fields of anthropology and healthcare.

== Work ==
Jordan's short films include The Atom Station, made in Iceland, featuring environmental activist Ómar Ragnarsson; Thought Broadcasting;The Entangled Forest, featuring ecologist Suzanne Simard; and Concrete Forms of Resistance.

Jordan's work has been shown at international galleries, museums and film festivals. International film festivals include CPH:DOX, Clermont-Ferrand International Short Film Festival, and Tampere Film Festival.

Jordan has also collaborated with artist Jacob Cartwright.

Jordan is the festival curator of Braziers International Film Festival, an annual three-day event held at Braziers Park.

== Publications ==
The artist's publications include Alien Invaders, published by Book Works, which takes the form of a guidebook to non-native species found in Britain, and the effects on native wildlife.

Other publications include Larksong chapbook and vinyl soundtrack album (British Textile Biennial/Folklore Tapes, 2023); Some Mild Peril (Castlefield Gallery, 2004);The Audubon Trilogy (Dedecus, 2010), a chapbook and series of short films drawn from the writings of 19th-century artist and frontiersman John James Audubon, following his escapades along the Ohio River and Mississippi River; and Heaven, Hell and Other Places, a documentary on Emanuel Swedenborg, commissioned by The Swedenborg Society.
