= Nobuko Tsuchiya =

Nobuko Tsuchiya (土屋 信子, Tsuchiya Nobuko) is an artist based in London.

Tsuchiya was born in 1972 in Yokohama, Japan. She studied art at Accademia di Belle Arti Firenze and the Goldsmiths, University of London. She makes sculptures out of found scraps of household objects. Nobuko begins her work by collecting items she's intuitively attracted to; then combines them into a polymer like structure, which are then cast. Her work was included in the 50th Venice Biennale in 2003.
