= Heddy Kun =

Israeli painter (born 1936)

- הדי קון
- Born: 1936 (age 89–90); Zagreb, Kingdom of Yugoslavia, (now Croatia)

Heddy Kun (Hebrew: הדי קון; born 1936) is an Israeli painter.

== Biography ==
Heddy Kun was born in Zagreb. Her parents and younger brother, Eliezer, were murdered in the Holocaust. They were all sent to the gas chambers in Auschwitz concentration camp. Kun escaped from the Nazis and hid in Budapest with her grandmother and her older brother, Shalom. After studying in the Budapest Academy of Art, she immigrated to Israel in 1956. Her son is the Israeli-American painter Shay Kun.

== Art career ==
Kun has had many exhibitions in Israel and in New York, and also in London, Budapest, Sydney, Amsterdam, Paris, Berlin, Toronto, Rome and Brussels.
