= Gaggle (band) =

- Origin: London
- Genres: alternative
- Years active: 2009–present
- Label: Transgressive Records
- Website: www.gaggle.tv

Gaggle is an all-girl alternative choir based in London. They were formed in 2009 and released their first album From the Mouth of the Cave in 2012. The group currently has 22 members, each of whom goes by a single-name pseudonym. The main songwriters are Deborah Coughlin and her former 586 bandmate, Simon Dempsey.

== History ==
Gaggle was founded by Deborah Coughlin in 2009. Within months Gaggle received recognition from NME in their "The fifty most forward-thinking people in music", and were featured in the Evening Standard as leaders in a movement described as "Choir Mania".

The group released their first single "I Hear Flies" in 2010 on Transgressive Records and won Camden Crawl's Best New Act for the Emerging Talent Awards, sponsored by Gibson.

In 2011, they released a limited EP called The Brilliant and the Dark on Record Store Day with a performance at Rough Trade East. This was a reworking of a forgotten 1969 Women's Institute opera found by artists Open Music Archive. Gaggle debuted the new show in 2010 at the Women's Library, then took it to the ICA where the record was recorded live, the B-Side compiled of live samples to be remixed by fans on a copyleft licence. Later, in 2011, they took "The Brilliant and the Dark" back to its original home The Royal Albert Hall, in the Elgar Room. This gained the attention of The Guardian who described it as "vivacious, visceral, spectacularly indignant wall of sound" in a 4 star review.

In 2012, they released their debut album From the Mouth of the Cave: two singles of which, Army of Birds and Power of Money, both received videos, respectively. The cost for second single "Power of Money" was £3000. The reason for the price was explained thus:

The Power of Generosity, Inventiveness, Courage. The Power of Flirting, Improvising, Blagging, Hard Work and Being Nice and Polite. The Power of Friendship, Faith, Obligation, Ambition, Anxiety…..Dreams. Without these Powers this track would not have been made. This song is precious. And yet, we’re told that ‘a single’ is almost valueless. And that pisses us off. So we have done a budget of how much this single ‘cost’. The many hours it took to write, arrange, compose, master; the expertise of all the musicians, technicians, designers, producers involved; the combination of all the Powers described above and more – we’ve totted it all up as best we can and… …we are putting this tune to market for the sum of £3000. The power of money? Let’s see.

Gaggle's music was included in the opening ceremony for the London 2012 Paralympic Games.

In 2013, Gaggle opened a three-week Pop Up Adventure in Lifestyle, Craft & Noise with gallery, shop and workshops. It took place in at abandoned shop in New Cross. They also released a free app on iTunes.

== Discography ==
=== Albums ===
- From the Mouth of the Cave (2012)

=== EPs ===
- "The Brilliant and the Dark" (2011)

=== Singles ===
- "I Hear Flies" (2010)
- "Army of Birds" (2012)
- "Power Of Money" (2012)
