= Martin Guarino =

Argentine footballer (born 1990)

Personal information
- Date of birth: 14 April 1990 (age 36)
- Place of birth: Buenos Aires, Argentina
- Height: 1.80 m (5 ft 11 in)
- Position: Left-back

Youth career
- –2009: Boca Juniors

Senior career*
Years	Team	Apps	(Gls)
2009–2011	Zwolle	12	(0)
2011–2013	Defensa y Justicia	18	(2)
2013–2015	Instituto	0	(0)
- * Club domestic league appearances and goals

Martin Guarino (born 24 October 1990) is an Argentine former professional footballer who played as a left-back.

== Career ==
Guarino was born in Buenos Aires, Argentina on 14 April 1990. He progressed through Boca Juniors' youth academy, before signing with Dutch Eerste Divisie club FC Zwolle in July 2009. Guarino made his professional and league debut for the club on 7 August 2009, in an away match against AGOVV Apeldoorn, which ended in a 2–0 defeat for Zwolle. At the end of the 2009–10 season, Guarino and teammate Dennis van der Wal were informed they could leave if they found a new club. However, neither player secured a move, and both remained at the club for the 2010–11 season.

In 2011, Guarino returned to Argentina to play for Defensa y Justicia, before joining Instituto in 2013.
