= Joanna Newman =

British academic, journalist and administrator

Dr Joanna Newman
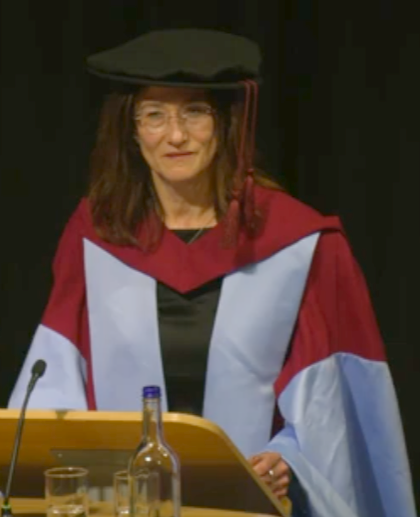
- At the SOAS Inaugural Lecture Series in 2025
- Education: Middlesex University; University College London; University of Southampton
- Occupations: Academic, journalist and administrator
- Title: Secretary general, Association of Commonwealth Universities

Joanna Newman MBE is a British academic, journalist and administrator. She was provost at SOAS University of London, and secretary general of the Association of Commonwealth Universities (ACU). in 2026 she was appointed Vice Chancellor of Goldsmiths, University of London.

Prior to joining the ACU, Newman was vice-principal (international) of King's College London. Her previous positions include director of the UK Higher Education International Unit (now known as Universities UK International) and head of higher education at the British Library. Newman is a faculty member in the Department of History at King's College London, and has taught history at University College London and the University of Warwick.

== Honours ==
- Member of the Order of the British Empire (2014)

== Selected publications ==
- Newman, Joanna, Nearly the New World: The British West Indies and the Escape from Nazism, 1933–1945, Berghahn Books, October 2019
- Refugees from Nazism in the British Caribbean, in J.Gerber (Ed.), The Jews in the Caribbean, Littman, Oxford, 2013
- The changing role of library and information services, in R. Andrews, E. Borg, S. Davis, M Domingo, & J. England (Eds.), The SAGE handbook of digital dissertations and theses, SAGE Publications, London, 2012.
- Postgraduate Education in the United Kingdom, (Ed), Higher Education Policy Institute and the British Library, January 2010
- Jews of Jamaica, Jewish Renaissance Magazine, Volume 6, Issue 2, January 2007
- Representations of the Holocaust in Film and Television from 1933, Eds., Joanna Newman & Toby Haggith, Wallflower Press, September 2005
- The Colonial Office and British Refugee Policy in the 1930s, in Administering Empire: The British Colonial Service in Retrospect, University of London Press, 1999.
- Articles for Encyclopaedia of the Holocaust, The Jerusalem Publishing House, Jerusalem, 1997
