= Nirmal Puwar =

British professor of sociology

Nirmal Puwar is a professor in the School of Media, Communications and Cultural Studies at Goldsmiths College, University of London and Co-Director of Methods Lab. She is a member of the Feminist Review editorial collective since 2000. Puwar has co-edited 17 Collections, including: Post-colonial Bourdieu; Orientalism and Fashion; Intimacy in Research; Live Methods and, South Asian Women in the Diaspora.

Puwar has written about and researches postcolonialism; institutions, race and gender & critical methodologies and has written two books; Space Invaders: race, gender and bodies out of place (2004), in which she argues that that diversity is about perceptions of whiteness rather than how whiteness operates, and Fashion and Orientalism (2003). In 2007, she directed the film Coventry Ritz which emphasizes "the haunting remnants of emptied out architecture and unused space."
