= Claudio Guarino =

Italian artist (1966–2004)

- Born: January 1966; Cesa, Italy
- Died: February 2004 (aged 38); Fitzrovia, London, England
- Education: Accademia di Belle Arti di Napoli; Goldsmiths College; Royal College of Art
- Partner: Steve Childs

Claudio Guarino (January 1966 – February 2004) was an Italian multimedia visual artist and musician based in London. He worked with video, performance, film and photography. His works were operatic performances in gallery spaces emphasising on visual rather than musical aspects.

Guarino studied at Goldsmiths College and the Royal College of Art in London. At Goldsmiths, he was awarded the Hamad Butt Award in 1997. In 1998 he was selected for the 'New Contemporaries' exhibition curated by Sacha Craddock.

== Solo shows ==
- Lost: The Unmovable Desire, Palazzo Ducale, Genoa, 2002.
- The Kiss of Tosca, performance opera at Galleria Artra, Milan, 2000.
- Aria, performance opera at Galleria Artra, Milan, 1998.
- Viene, performance opera at Chiesa di Sant'Angelo, Pisa, 1998.
- House of Injection, performance opera at Institute of Contemporary Arts, London, 1997. Music composed by Hayden Parsey.
- Mater Dolorosa, performance opera at Victoria Miro Gallery, London, 1997. Music composed by Hayden Parsey.
- Suspicion, performance opera at Victoria Miro Gallery, London, 1996. Music composed by Hayden Parsey.

== Group shows ==
- Limit: Video Invitational, fa projects, London, 2003
- Meant Me, Royal College of Art, London, 2002
- Sledge, The Jam Factory, London, 2002
- I giochi e le fiabe, Museo Laboratorio d'Arte Contemporanea, Citta Sant'Angelo, Italy, 2000
- Eurostar, Westland Palace, London, 2000
- Soggettivita e narrazione, Museo d'Arte Contemporanea, Caste of Rivoli, Turin, 1999
- New Contemporaries, Tea Factory, Liverpool, 1998
- Corto Circuito, Palazzo Reale, Naples, 1998

== Bibliography ==
- Steve Child, Giorgio Verzotti and Francesco Bernadelli (2008) Claudio Guarino, Charta Art Books, Milan ISBN 978-88-8158-671-4
- Maria Rosa Sossai (2002), Artevideo: Storie e culture del video d'artista in Italia, Silvana Editoriale, Milan ISBN 978-88-8215-387-8
- Giorgio Verzotti, "Claudio Guarino: The Kiss of Tosca", Artforum, November 2000
- Sacha Craddock, Phyllida Barlow, Eddie Berg, Adrian Searle and Christine Hohenbuchler (1998), New Contemporaries, New Contemporaries, London ISBN 978-88-8215-387-8
