= Tungsten Network =

Global electronic invoicing firm

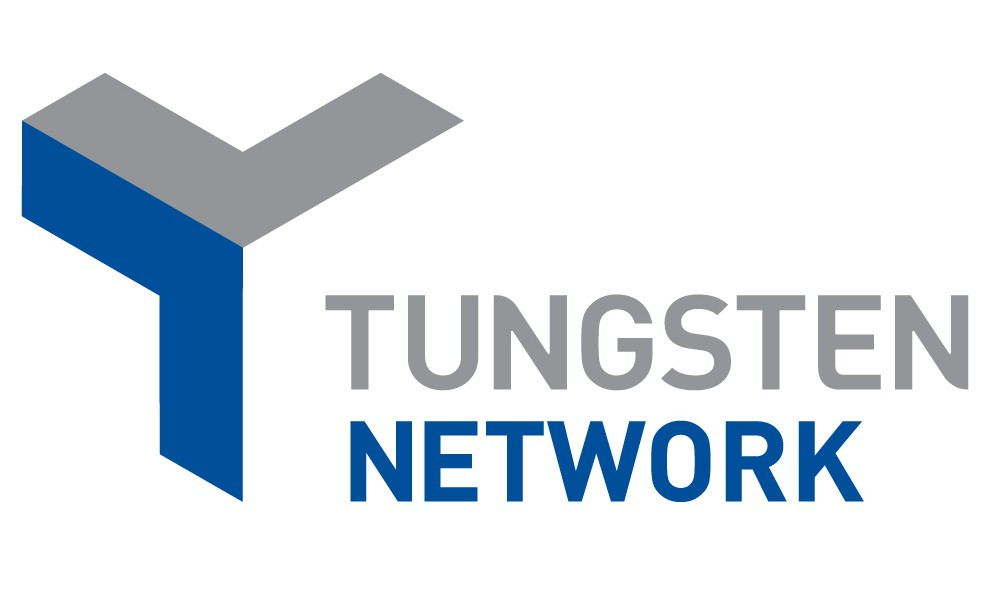
- Type: Public
- Traded as: AIM: TUNG
- Industry: Electronic invoicing
- Founded: 2000
- Founder: Edmund "Eddie" Truell, Danny Truell, Stefan Foryszewski, Chris Lowrie, Alain Falys and John Jermy
- Headquarters: London, England, UK
- Key people: Paul Cooper, CEO
- Revenue: GBP £36.0 million (FY2019)
- Number of employees: 227 (FY2022)

Tungsten Network is a global electronic invoicing firm that provides supply chain financing services from international offices in the United Kingdom, United States, Bulgaria, Germany, and Malaysia. Tungsten Corporation Plc (TUNG) is reported to trade regularly on the London Stock Exchange.

Peter Hantman is CEO.

== History ==
Tungsten Network was founded in 2000 as OB10 in London, England. The company was founded by Stefan Foryszewski, Chris Lowrie, Alain Falys and John Jermy. OB10 was acquired by Tungsten Corp. in late 2013 and renamed the Tungsten Network. Tungsten purchased OB10 for £99 million. Tungsten Network provides a global cloud-based trading network built on OB10's e-invoicing platform. The service integrates client billing and accounting systems with their suppliers' invoicing and accounting systems.

Founded from Open Business Exchange, or OB10, Tungsten Network's electronic invoicing and payment services are partnered with companies including Alliance Data, IBM, Kellogg's, General Motors, and the US Federal Government.

In September 2014, Tungsten acquired DocuSphere – a US-based provider of invoice-automation services. The purchase was funded by a share placing, rather than an open offer.

In September 2019, Andrew Lemonofides took over as chief executive officer of Tungsten Corporation plc from Richard Hurwitz.

On 9 July 2021 Paul Cooper was appointed as the new CEO.

On June 20, 2022, the company was acquired by Kofax. Two years later, in January 2024, Kofax was renamed to Tungsten Automation.

The company has offices in San Francisco and Atlanta in the United States, as well as Sofia, Bulgaria and Kuala Lumpur, Malaysia.

== Products ==
The company was one of the first vendors to push an “open network” concept, along with Basware. In the fall of 2017, Tungsten released its inaugural Friction Index report to showcase the amount of time that is being spent on inefficient practices.

=== Tungsten Network ===
Tungsten Network is Tungsten's core business, a worldwide buyer-supplier community that processed over £133 billion in transactions in fiscal year 2016. The network processes invoices and purchase order transactions through Tungsten Network's online portal, with the aim to reduce human touch points to deliver secure transactions.

=== Tungsten Network Workflow ===
Tungsten Network Workflow is a software suite that automates accounts payable processes and includes a document repository and reporting. The suite offers end-to-end visibility of invoices from initial receipt until payment by monitoring payment processing in an ERP system and pulling back the associated payment data.

=== Tungsten Network Analytics ===
This product analyzes procurement spending based on invoice data. The software provides line-level product information, analyzes campaigns, and matches prices for competing products. Tungsten Network Analytics is fully compliant with US federal requirements as of April 2014.
