= Tom Ingleby =

UK music composer, producer and painter (born 1967)

Tom Ingleby is a UK music composer, producer and painter born in Leamington Spa, 1967. He subsequently lived in America, (1971) Surrey and Mid Wales. His interest in music started at an early age in the US. Eventually moving to rural Mid-Wales aged 12 he met Cat Stevens' guitarist Alun Davis and also Yardbirds member/record producer Paul Samwell-Smith, who were both neighbours and they deeply influenced and encouraged his interest in music.

After living in Florence, Italy Tom did a Foundation course at Byam Shaw School of Painting and Drawing (1987-1989), then completed a BA in Fine Art (Painting) at Chelsea School of Art (1989-1992). Studied under Noel Forster and Clyde Hopkins and was contemporary of Chris Ofili. Also studied Music Theory at Goldsmiths college. Signed first songwriting publishing deal with Warner Chappell Music in 1997.

Went on to compose the music for the acclaimed British film Everything-(Dir-Richard Hawkins), which won a BAFTA nomination in 2004 and starred Ray Winstone, and The Spirit directed by Joseph Fiennes. Also worked on the film Crimson Wing alongside Cinematic Orchestra. Scored the Hyundai i20, i30, i40 and ix35 'Think Again' campaigns and the music for a global campaign for Russian Standard Vodka amongst many others. Works with a variety of artists and musicians: currently classical violinist Diana Yukawa, who he co writes and produces. Other artists Tom has collaborated with are Ed Sheeran, Jason Cooper, (of The Cure), Neneh Cherry, Sophie Barker from Zero 7. Writes on a piano given to him by the late composer John Barry who was Grandfather to Tom’s first two children, Phoebe and Florence. Married to Sophie (Rena) and has four children, Milo, Harriet, Phoebe and Florence and lives and works in London.
