= Guarinus =

Guarinus is a given name. Notable people with the name include:

- Guarinus of Sitten (1065–1150), Bishop of Sion and saint
- Guarinus of Palestrina (c. 1080–1158), Bishop of Palestrina and saint
