= Jacob Cartwright and Nick Jordan =

Visual artists, film makers

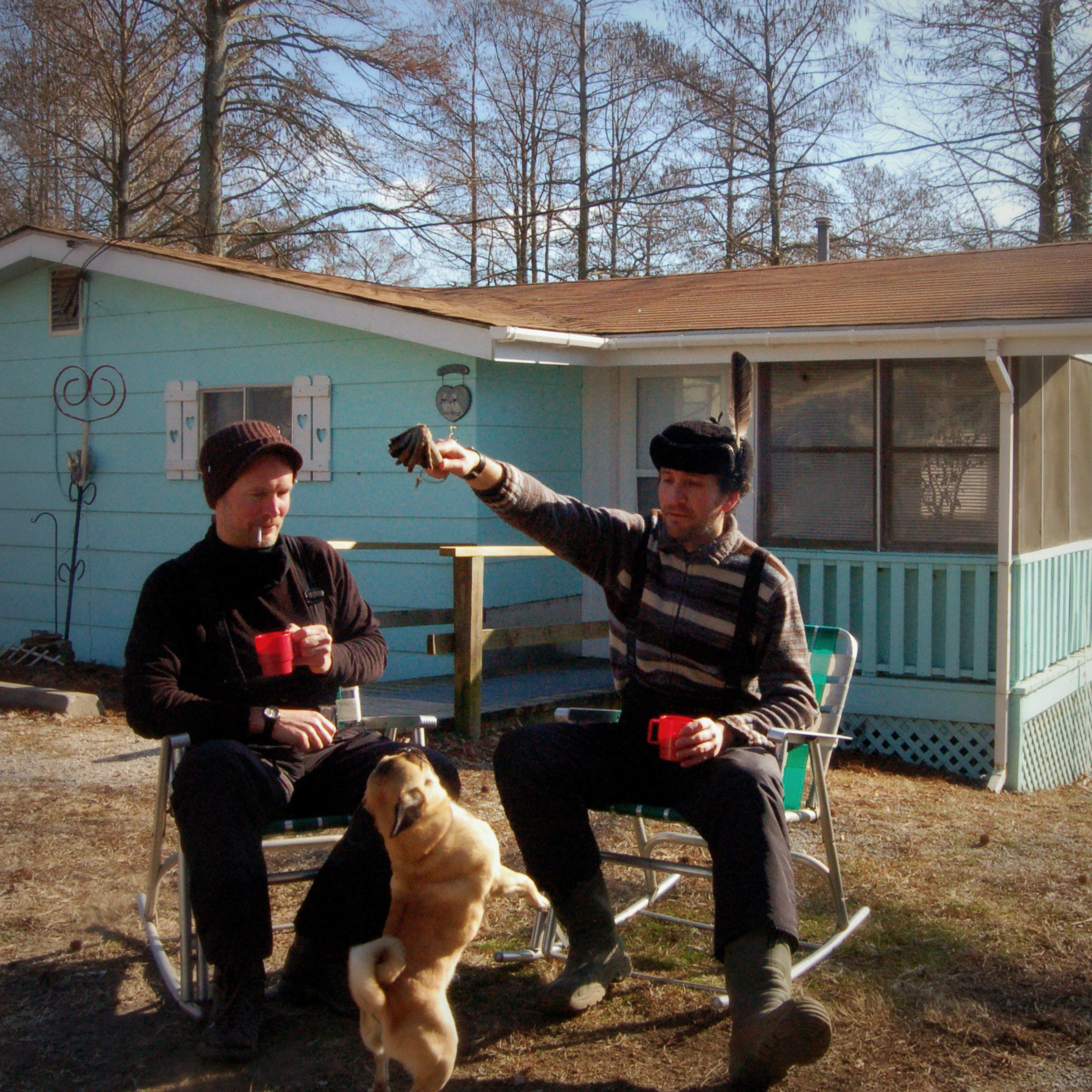
Jacob Cartwright and Nick Jordan, Horseshoe Lake, Illinois

Jacob Cartwright and Nick Jordan (artist) are visual artists and film-makers based in Manchester, UK. They have been collaborating since 2003. Their work has been exhibited internationally, including at Innsbruck International Biennale; Kunstmuseum Bonn; Documenta (Madrid); Whitstable Biennale; Haus der Kulturen, Berlin; The New York Film Festival; State Darwin Museum (Moscow); Musée du quai Branly, (Paris).

The artists' practice is cross-disciplinary, encompassing video, drawing, painting, photography, found objects, publications and events, and often explores the relationship between the natural world and social or cultural histories.

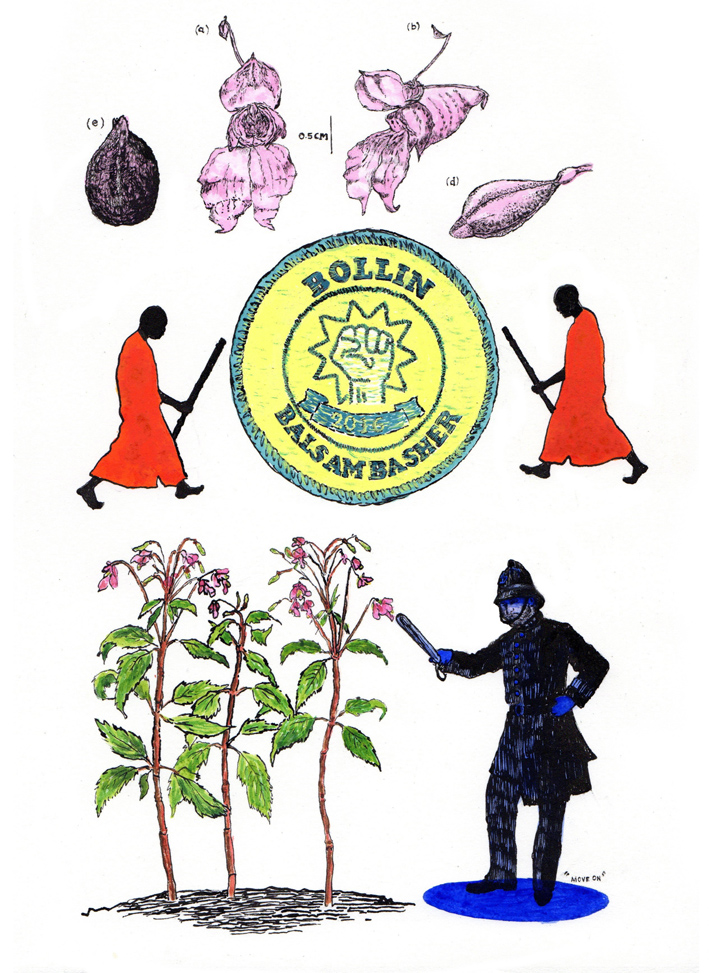
Himalayan Balsam drawing for 'Exotic Guests & Alien Invaders', The National Trust, 2016

Cartwright and Jordan are the authors of Alien Invaders, published by Book Works, which takes the form of a guidebook to non-native species found in Britain, and the effects on native wildlife. Drawing on both scientific fact and cultural anecdote, and offset by the artists' interventions, ten invasive species are categorised and illustrated, including the American bullfrog, giant hogweed, pharaoh ant and wels catfish.

Other published works include The Audubon Trilogy, a series of short films drawn from the writings of 19th-century artist and frontiersman John James Audubon, following his escapades along the Ohio River and Mississippi River. The first film in the trilogy,West Point, features Audubon's account of large flocks of the now extinct passenger pigeons in the woods of Kentucky. New Madrid, the second film, includes Audubon's experience of the New Madrid earthquake, and won the Wall Flower Press award for Best Experimental Film at the 2009 London Short Film Festival. The third film in the trilogy, Cairo, was featured in a joint solo exhibition of their work at Cornerhouse, Manchester: Cairo: The Breaking up of the Ice.

Jacob Cartwright and Nick Jordan are the directors of Between Two Rivers (2012) – a feature-length documentary about the town of Cairo, Illinois. The film was awarded the Audience Choice Award at the Big Muddy Film Festival, 2012, and won Best Film at River's Edge International Film Festival, 2012.

In 2023, the artists were selected to make new work for the British Textile Biennial and English Heritage. The resulting work, Larksong, was presented as a film and installation at the 18th century nonconformist Goodshaw Chapel, Rossendale.

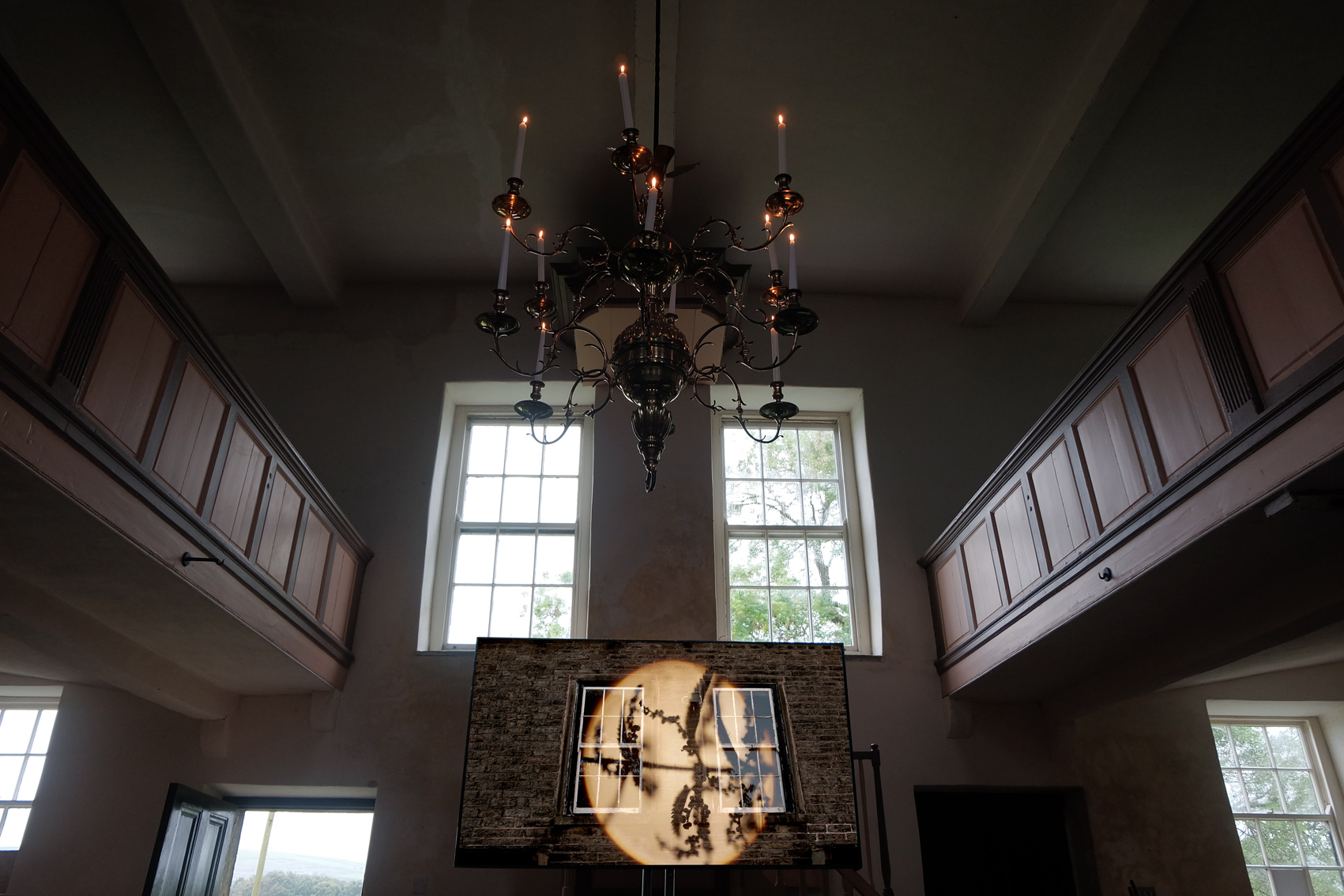
Larksong installation, Goodshaw Chapel, British Textile Biennial 2023

The artists have undertaken residences and commissions from a variety of institutions and organisations, including for the British Textile Biennial, English Heritage, National Trust; Arts & Heritage; Forma; Book Works; ICA; The University of Manchester; Art Gene; British Society of Aesthetics (UK); The Swedenborg Society; Cornerhouse; Manchester Museum; Headlands Center for the Arts; Stasi Archives.

== Selected works ==
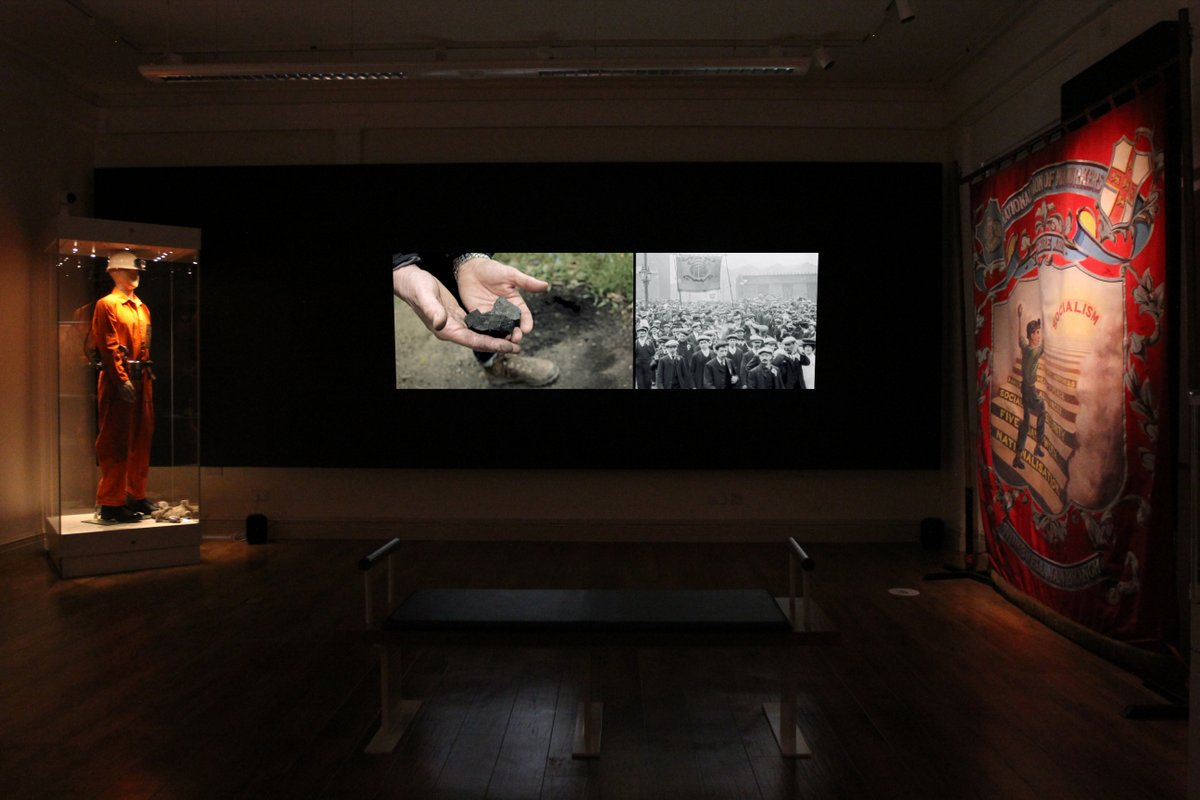
STRATA: Structures, Transformation, Solidarity; Barnsley Museum, 2018

- 2023 Larksong (short film, chapbook and exhibition)
- 2022 The Open Secret (short film)
- 2022 Swalesong (short film)
- 2021 The Unofficial Countryside (short film)
- 2021 The Wild Enclosed (short film)
- 2020 Welcome to Metropolis, 2020 (short film)
- 2018 'Stratum', (short film)
- 2018 'STRATA: Structures, Transformation, Solidarity', (solo exhibition and two-screen film)
- 2016 'Exotic Guests & Alien Invaders' (solo exhibition)
- 2016 'Last Acre', (short film)
- 2015 The Emotions of Others, (short film)
- 2015 Off the Trail, (short film)
- 2014 Headlands Lookout, (short film)
- 2012 Between Two Rivers, (documentary feature film)
- 2011 American Water, (short film)
- 2010 'Cairo: The breaking up of the ice', (solo exhibition) Cornerhouse, Manchester
- 2010 'The Audubon Trilogy: Cairo, West Point, New Madrid', (publication/DVD) Cornerhouse, Manchester
- 2010 'Heaven, Hell and Other Places' (documentary)
- 2010 'Fourteen Interventions' (exhibition)
- 2009 The Reapers (short film)
- 2009 'Practical Truths' (exhibition installation)
- 2009 'MoNO, The Museum of Native Oaks' (solo exhibition)
- 2007 'Rub-a-dub-dub' (solo exhibition, with Stephen McNeilly)
- 2006 'Alien Invaders' (publication)
- 2006 'Godwottery' (solo exhibition)
- 2004 'Some Mild Peril' (publication)
- 2004 'The Goose Fair' (solo exhibition)
