= Bridget Smith =

Bridget Smith (born 1966) is a visual artist working with photography and video.

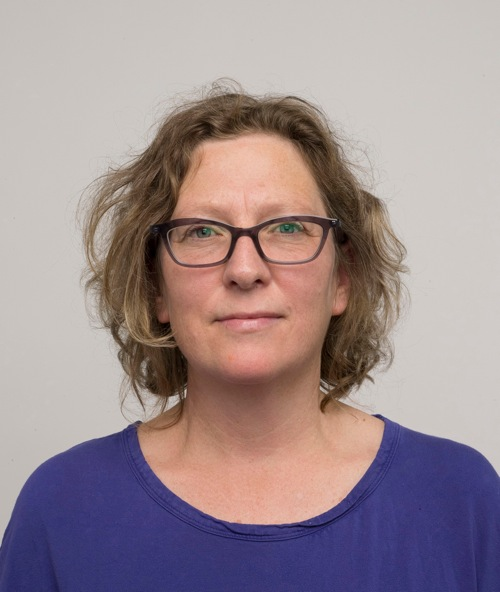
Bridget Smith (artist)

Smith works within the documentary genre but she photographs places of fantasy and escapism. Smith is interested in the places where people go to seek refuge from the outside world: to escape boredom, to be diverted, transported, absorbed – places to lose oneself, where pretence and reality are often confused.

Smith's photographs have documented the construction of fantasy and the architecture of entertainment, the function of which is to disconnect people from their everyday lives and concerns. Since 2005 her practice has expanded to include both still and moving images which address our struggle to feel connected: within society, the landscape and the wider universe. The photographs and videos often point to the gap between one's imagination and reality and the interplay between the two. The work flits between objectivity and subjectivity, the real and the fake.

== Education ==
Smith graduated from Goldsmiths College, University of London in 1988 with a BA (Hons) in Fine Art. In 1995 she completed an MA in Fine Art at Goldsmiths College.

== Selected works ==
We Must Live!, 2011

- Stationary Engine Club, Whangarei 2006, 2010
- Southwark Sea Cadets, Walworth, 2007
- William Morris Community Centre Users Association, Walthamstow, 2007
- Mountain and Sky (Rangi and Papa), 2006–2008
- Dome, 2005
- Airport, Las Vegas, 1999
- Glamour Studio (Chaise Longue), 1999
- Austrian Suite, 1997
- Premier, 1995
- Odeon (Blue), 1995

== Selected exhibitions ==
The Occupants: Contemporary Perspectives on the Picker House, a group exhibition at Stanley Picker Gallery, Kingston, 2012
We Must Live! a solo exhibition Frith Street Gallery, London, 2011
Government Art Collection: Selected by Cornelia Parker: Richard of York Gave Battle In Vain, a group exhibition at Whitechapel Gallery, London, 2011
Nobody Else Even Knows, a solo exhibition at Peer, London, 2010
Killing Time, a solo exhibition at Two Rooms Gallery, Auckland, New Zealand, 2008
Stardust or the Last Frontier, a group exhibition at Musée D’art Contemporain, Val de Marne, 2007
Rebuild, a solo exhibition at De La Warr Pavilion, Bexhill on Sea, 2006
Cosmos, a solo exhibition at Frith Street Gallery, London, 2005 – 2006

== Selected bibliography ==
Society (Published by SteidlMACK and General Public Agency, 2007)
Bridget Smith (Published by De La Warr Pavilion, 2006)
Bridget Smith (Published by Centro de Art de Salamanca, 2002)
