= Goldsmiths, University of London =

Constituent university in London, England

- Coat of arms
- Former names: The Goldsmiths' Technical and Recreative Institute (1891–1904)
- Type: Public constituent college
- Established: 1891 – Tertiary college 1904 – Constituent college
- Parent institution: University of London
- Affiliations: University of London; Association of Commonwealth Universities; Universities UK
- Endowment: £18.2 million (2025)
- Budget: £139.7 million (2024/25)
- Chancellor: Anne, Princess Royal (as Chancellor of the University of London)
- Vice-Chancellor: Joanna Newman
- Students: 7,910 (2024/25)
- Undergraduates: 4,490 (2024/25)
- Postgraduates: 3,420 (2024/25)
- Location: 8 Lewisham Way, London, England; 51.4739°N 0.0354°W
- Campus: Urban
Scarf
- Colours: Purple; Black; Gold
- Website: gold.ac.uk

Goldsmiths, University of London, (Note: Officially rendered as the possessive "Goldsmiths', University of London" but normally as "Goldsmiths, University of London" in everyday use) formerly Goldsmiths' College, University of London, is a constituent research university of the University of London. It was originally founded in 1891 as The Goldsmiths' Technical and Recreative Institute by the Worshipful Company of Goldsmiths in New Cross, London. It was renamed Goldsmiths' College after being acquired by the University of London in 1904, and specialises in the arts, design, computing, humanities and social sciences. The main building on campus, known as the Richard Hoggart Building, was originally opened in 1844 and is the site of the former Royal Naval School.

According to Quacquarelli Symonds (2021), Goldsmiths ranks 12th in the world in Communication and Media Studies, 15th in Art & Design and is ranked in the top 50 in the areas of Anthropology, Sociology and the Performing Arts. In 2020, the university enrolled over 10,000 students at undergraduate and postgraduate levels. 37% of students come from outside the United Kingdom and 52% of all undergraduates are mature students (aged 21 or over at the start of their studies). Additionally, around a third of students at Goldsmiths are postgraduate students.

== History ==
=== Founding ===
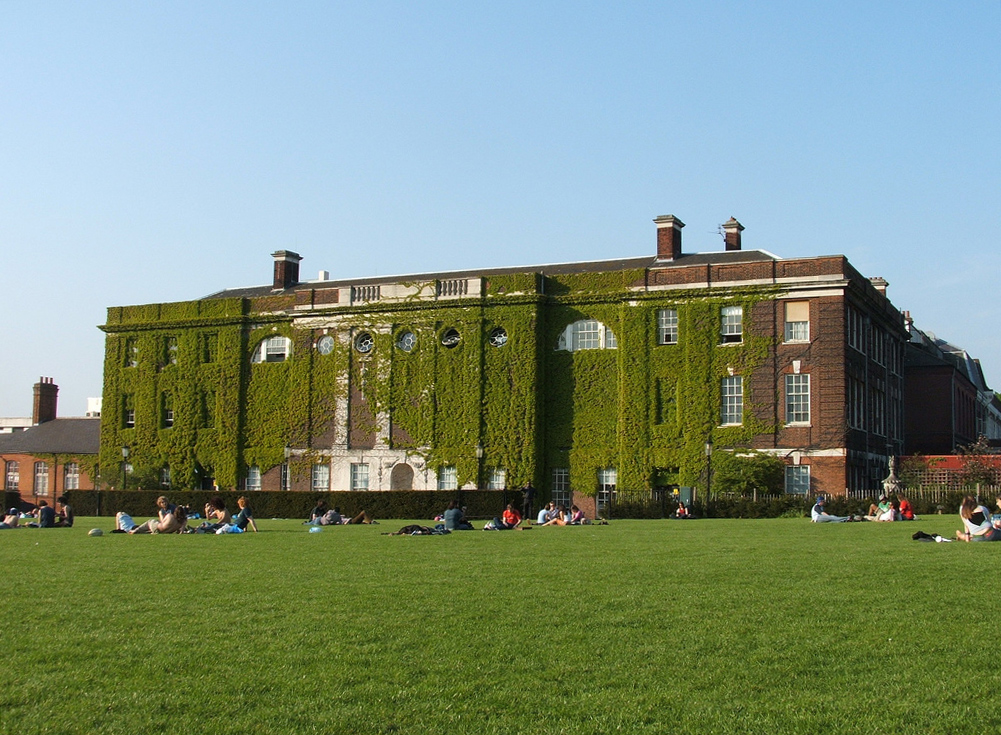
The Richard Hoggart Building

In 1891, the Worshipful Company of Goldsmiths, one of the Livery Companies of the City of London, founded The Goldsmiths' Technical and Recreative Institute (more commonly referred to simply as the "Goldsmiths' Institute"). The Goldsmiths' Company was established in the 12th century as a medieval guild for goldsmiths, silversmiths, and jewellers. It dedicated the foundation of its new Institute to "the promotion of technical skill, knowledge, health and general well-being among men and women of the industrial, working and artisan classes". The original Institute was based in New Cross at the site of the former Royal Naval School; the building, now known as the Richard Hoggart Building, remains the main building of the campus today.

=== 21st century ===
In 2018, the former boiler house and public laundry of Laurie Grove Baths was refurbished and opened as Goldsmiths CCA.

In August 2019, Goldsmiths announced that it would be removing all beef products from sale and would be charging a 10p levy on bottled water and single-use plastic cups. The changes were introduced as part of the university's efforts to become carbon neutral by 2025.

=== Financial difficulties and restructuring ===
Goldsmiths reported a deficit in 2019 and appointed Frances Corner as warden. In January 2020, Goldsmiths proposed to cut costs by 15% over two years in the "Evolving Goldsmiths" plan by reducing faculty and centralizing administration. According to the Goldsmiths University and College Union (UCU), the plan did not address the causes of the deficit, which it attributed in part to overoptimistic enrolment forecasts and excessive capital expenditures. Furthermore, UCU warned that cuts to faculty would increase the deficit by reducing the income stream of tuition fees, which accounted for 77% of the college's revenue in the 2019–2020 fiscal year. "Evolving Goldsmiths" was closed in April 2022. While the UCU proposed selling underused property to build cash reserves in summer 2020, this option was not taken up by management. Goldsmiths consolidated and refinanced its loans through NatWest and Lloyds Bank; as part of this, the banks required the college to consult KPMG to discover cost saving opportunities.

The 2021 recovery plan included elimination of 52 faculty and staff positions. In addition to the underlying deficit, Goldsmiths identified costs from COVID-19, government cuts, and falling student numbers caused by increased competition following the removal of the government cap and lower numbers studying subjects at A-level. According to the UCU in March 2022, the college refused to stop layoffs although savings from voluntary resignations and maintaining vacancies exceeded the requirements of the banks. Administrative staff were concentrated into a central hub in 2021–2022 in order to streamline operations, but the disruption led to offer letters being sent too late for international students to get visas. This contributed to a reduction in the number of enrolments by international students, who are a critical revenue steam.

Following the recovery plan, a "transformation programme" was announced in early 2024. This included the elimination of 132 full-time- equivalent positions, or 17% of all staff, with some departments being reduced by 50%. The plan was expected to be completed by September. According to The Guardian, the extent of the cuts would radically change the university's culture.

In August 2024, the UCU announced that it had prevented compulsory redundancies for the 2024/25 academic year.

Frances Corner stepped down as vice-chancellor on 1 October 2025, with the deputy vice-chancellor, David Oswell, becoming interim vice-chancellor.

In 2026 a third restructuring in five years was proposed, resulting in a strike.

== Campus and location ==
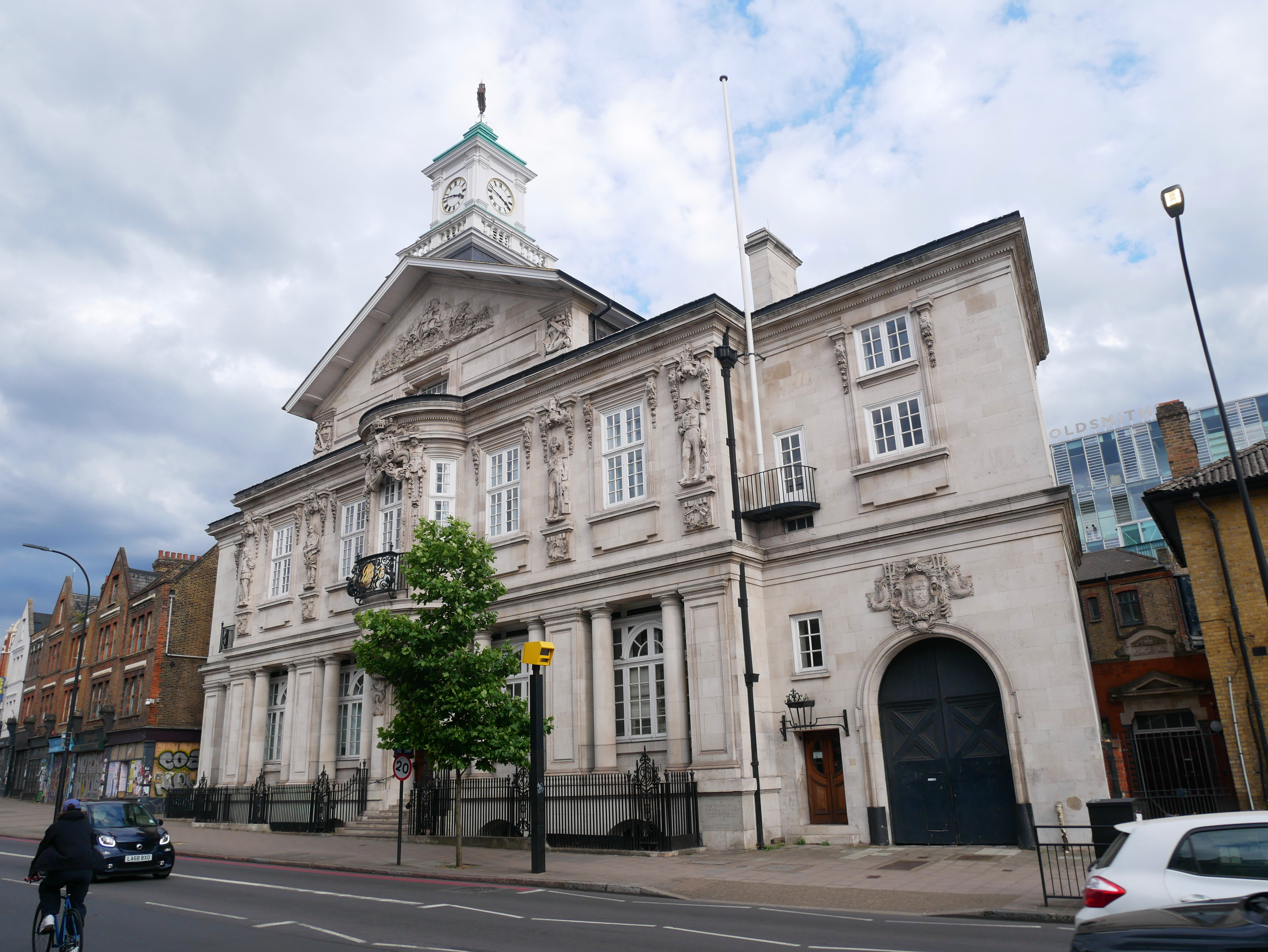
Deptford Town Hall building

Goldsmiths is situated in New Cross, a densely populated area of south-east London.

The main building, the Richard Hoggart Building, was originally designed as a school (opened in 1844) by the architect John Shaw, Jr (1803–1870). The former Deptford Town Hall building, designed by Henry Vaughan Lanchester and Edwin Alfred Rickards, acquired in 1998, is used for academic seminars and conferences. In addition to this Goldsmiths has built several more modern buildings to develop the campus, including the RIBA award-winning Rutherford Building completed in 1997, the Ben Pimlott Building designed by Will Alsop and completed in 2005, and the Professor Stuart Hall Building (formerly the New Academic Building), which was completed in 2010.

The library, or the Rutherford Building', has three floors and gives students access to an extensive range of printed and electronic resources. Goldsmiths' students, like all other students in the University of London, have full access to the collections at Senate House Library at Bloomsbury in central London.

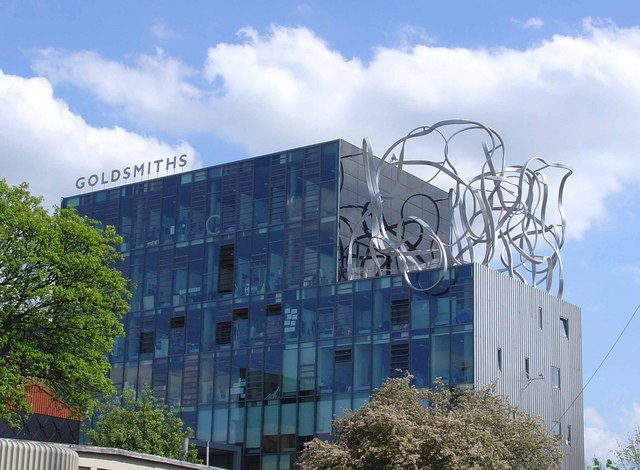
The Ben Pimlott Building

The seven-storey Ben Pimlott Building on New Cross Road, complete with its distinctive "scribble in the sky" (made from 229 separate pieces of metal) has become a signature of modern Goldsmiths. It contains studio and teaching space for the Department of Art, as well as housing the Goldsmiths Digital Studios and the Centre for Cognition, Computation and Culture.

The Professor Stuart Hall Building, situated next to the green, is home to the Media and Communications Department and the Institute for Creative and Cultural Entrepreneurship (ICCE). Formerly the New Academic Building), in 2014 it was renamed after cultural theorist Stuart Hall. Facilities include a 250-seat lecture theatre, seminar and teaching rooms, as well as a cafe with outdoor seating.

In January 2026, Goldsmiths announced that it would open a campus at the site of the Old Town Hall in Catford, an area of Lewisham. In October 2026, Goldsmiths announced that the plan was cancelled.

== Academic profile ==
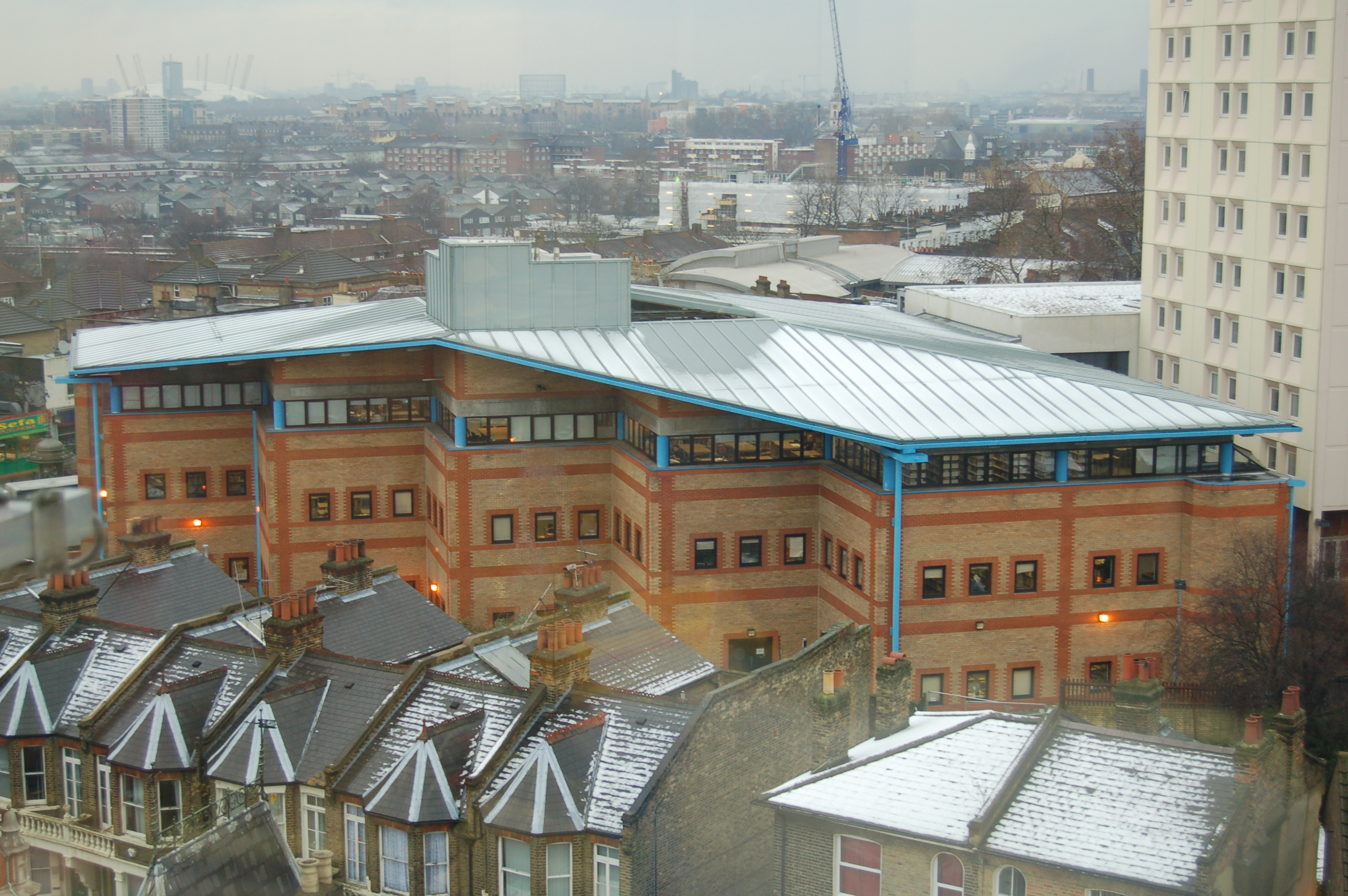
The Library

=== Faculties and departments ===
==== Art ====
The Head of Department is Richard Noble. Notable alumni include Damien Hirst, Sarah Lucas, Steve McQueen, Gillian Wearing, Fiona Banner, Angela Bulloch, Hamad Butt, Graham Coxon, and Graham Sutherland. The university is also a member of the Screen Studies Group, London.

==== Design ====
The Department of Design's approach to design practice grew from a concern for ethical and environmentalist design. This developed alongside research by John Wood, Julia Lockheart, and others, which informs their research into metadesign. TERU, the Technology Education Research Unit, has been instrumental in understanding how design and technology work in schools, how to encourage learners towards creative interventions that improve the made world, and how to help teachers to support that process. The Writing Purposefully in Art and Design Network (Writing-PAD) has its main Centre at Goldsmiths. The Network now spans about 70 institutions across the art and design sector with 6 national and 2 International Writing PAD Centres.

==== Computing ====
The Department of Computing lets students attend programs focused on Computer Science, Computer Games Art & Design, Computational Technology, Computational Cognitive Neuroscience, Computer Games Programming, Computational Linguistics, Data Science, User Experience Engineering, and Virtual & Augmented Reality.

==== Sociology ====
The Sociology Department includes Nirmal Puwar, and David Hirsh.

==== Cultural studies ====
The Media and Communications Department, as well as the Centre for Cultural Studies, include Matthew Fuller, Scott Lash, Angela McRobbie, Nirmal Puwar and (formerly) Sara Ahmed.

==== Institute for Creative and Cultural Entrepreneurship ====
The Institute for Creative and Cultural Entrepreneurship delivers entrepreneurship, cultural management and policy education to the creative and cultural sectors.

==== Anthropology ====
The Department of Anthropology teaching staff included Keith Hart and David Graeber. The department is known for its focus on visual anthropology. The realm of continental philosophy is represented with academics such as Saul Newman, as well as Visiting Professors Andrew Benjamin and Bernard Stiegler. In the area of Psychology there is Chris French who specialises in the psychology of paranormal beliefs and experiences, cognition and emotion. Saul Newman – notable for developing the concept of post-anarchism – is currently leading the department of politics.

==== English and comparative literature ====
The English & Comparative Literature Department covers English, comparative literature, American literature, creative writing and linguistics. Current academics include Blake Morrison and Chris Baldick.

==== Music ====
The Research Centre for Russian Music, convened by Alexander Ivashkin until his death in 2014, is internationally renowned for its archives devoted to Prokofiev and Schnittke, and unique collections including of music by Stravinsky, and first editions of Russian Piano Music.

Other research centres at the department include the Unit for Sound Practice Research co-founded and co-directed by John Levack Drever, Contemporary Music Research Group, Asian Music Unit, Afghanistan Music Unit, Fringe and Underground Music Group, and the Centre for Music and Ethnographic Film. The Sonic Scope Journal of Audiovisual Studies is based in the department.

The department curates the annual PureGold festival, which takes place during May and June in venues across South-East London including the Albany Theatre, Deptford. It continues with PureGold [REDUX], which showcases postgraduate students in September, with a final MMus show in November, with work from Creative Practice, Composition, Sonic Arts, Performance & Related Studies and Popular Music students. The department houses two recording studios: Goldsmiths Music Studios, and the Stanley Glasser Electronic Music Studios, established in 1968 by the composer, instrument maker, and musicologist Hugh Davies.

NX Records, an independent record label, is a collaboration between Matthew Herbert's Accidental Records and the Department of Music.

==== Educational studies ====
The Department of Educational Studies teaches undergraduate, masters and doctoral courses, and is home to a large programme of initial teacher education (primary and secondary), based on partnership arrangements with over 1500 schools and colleges.

==== Additional academic programmes ====
Goldsmiths paired with Tungsten Network in 2015 to develop a research programme that explores advanced artificial intelligence techniques for Big Data and business practices. Known as Tungsten Centre for Intelligent Data Analytics, the programme is based in the company's London office.

=== Rankings ===
Rankings
National rankings
- Complete (2027): 61
- Guardian (2027): 88
- Times / Sunday Times (2027): 82

Global rankings
- QS (2027): 701–710
- THE (2026): 501–600

QS World University Rankings ranked Goldsmiths' media and communications offerings as second in the UK and eighth worldwide in 2017, and second and eleventh respectively in 2023.

=== Open access to research by Goldsmiths academics ===
Goldsmiths Research Online (GRO) is a repository of research publications and other research outputs conducted by academics at Goldsmiths. The repository also holds Goldsmiths' collection of doctoral theses. GRO is part of Goldsmiths Online Research Collections (ORC) which also includes Goldsmiths Journals Online (GOJO), a hosting platform for open access journals and conference proceedings.

== Student life ==
=== Sports, clubs and traditions ===
Sports teams and societies are organised by the Goldsmiths Students' Union. The Union runs multiple sports clubs which compete in BUCS leagues. The Students' Union also runs numerous societies.

=== Student media ===
Goldsmiths has a long history of student-led media platforms, including Smiths Magazine, The Leopard newspaper, and Wired radio. The student media is run independently by students at the college.

=== Student housing ===
Accommodation Services offers accommodation across:

- Loring Hall
- Ewen Henderson Court
- Surrey House
- Chesterman House
- Raymont Hall

Electricity, internet and gas bills are included in the rent.

=== Students' Union ===
The Goldsmiths Students' Union (GSU) is the union of student representatives from the Goldsmiths University of London. It is a registered charity independent of the university which advocates for students in academic, social, and welfare dimensions. The GSU is also responsible for organizing social events, workshops, and lobbying for improvement to campus facilities. Elected officers run the GSU. Elections typically occur in the spring when students vote for their representatives. Officer positions include four full-time remunerated, and fourteen part-time positions. The elections are independently verified by a returning officer from the National Union of Students of the United Kingdom. Each year the GSU publishes its Annual Impact Report which outlines the organization's work, campaigns, and achievements. The document is designed in-house, presented to the college management board, then made available to students. The union provides academic representation for students through elected sabbatical officers. It also provides an advice service on academic issues and a provision of sports clubs and societies.

== See also ==
- Armorial of UK universities
- E-scape
- Forensic Architecture
- Goldsmiths CCA
- List of Goldsmiths College people
- List of universities in the UK
