= List of compositions by Alfred Schnittke =

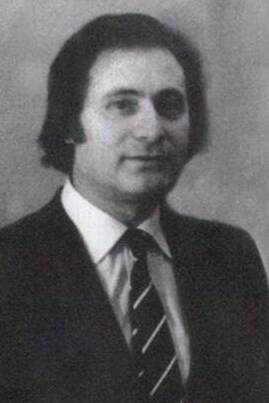
Composer Alfred Schnittke

This is a list of compositions by Alfred Schnittke.

== Orchestral ==
=== Symphonies ===
- Symphony No. 0 (1956–57)
- Symphony No. 1 (1969–74)
- Symphony No. 2 "St. Florian" (1979)
- Symphony No. 3 (1981)
- Symphony No. 4 (1983)
- Symphony No. 5 [Concerto Grosso No. 4] (1988)
- Symphony No. 6 (1992)
- Symphony No. 7 (1993)
- Symphony No. 8 (1994)
- Symphony No. 9 (1996–97; reconstructed by Alexander Raskatov)

=== Other orchestral ===
- Pianissimo (1968)
- In Memoriam ... (1978; orchestration of the Piano Quintet)
- Gogol Suite (arr. 1980 by Rozhdestvensky from Music for The Census List, 1978)
- Passacaglia (1980)
- Ritual (1985)
- (K)ein Sommernachtstraum (1985)
- Symphonic Prelude (1994)
- For Liverpool (1994)

== Concertos and concertante pieces ==
=== Violin and orchestra ===
- Concerto No. 1 for violin and orchestra (1957, revised 1963)
- Concerto No. 2 for violin and chamber orchestra (1966)
- Concerto No. 3 for violin and chamber orchestra (1978)
- Concerto No. 4 for violin and orchestra (1984)

=== Piano and orchestra ===
- Poème for piano and orchestra (1953)
- Concerto for piano and orchestra (1960)
- Music for piano and chamber orchestra (1964)
- Concerto for Piano and String Orchestra (1979)
- Concerto for piano four hands and chamber orchestra (1988) "to Viktoria Postnikova and Irina Schnittke"

=== Cello and orchestra ===
- Concerto No. 1 for cello and orchestra (1985/1986)
- Concerto No. 2 for cello and orchestra (1990) "to M.Rostropovich"

=== Viola and orchestra ===
- Concerto for viola and orchestra (1985)
- Monologue for viola and strings (1989)
- Concerto for viola and small orchestra (1997)

=== Other instruments and orchestra ===
- Accordion Concerto (1949), lost work
- Double Concerto for oboe, harp, and string orchestra (Lento) "to Heinz Holliger, Ursula Holliger and the Zagreb Soloists" (1971)
- Concerto Grosso No. 1 for two violins, prepared piano, harpsichord and 21 strings (1977)
- Moz-Art à la Haydn for two violins and string orchestra (1977)
- Concerto Grosso No. 1 for flute, oboe, harpsichord, prepared piano and string orchestra (1988 version)
- Concerto Grosso No. 2 for violin, cello and triple symphony orchestra (1981–1982)
- Concerto Grosso No. 3 for two violins, harpsichord, celesta, piano and 14 strings (1985)
- Concerto Grosso No. 4 [Symphony No. 5] for violin, oboe, harpsichord and orchestra (1988)
- Concerto Grosso No. 5 for violin, [offstage] piano and orchestra (1990–1991)
- Concerto Grosso No. 6 for piano, violin and string orchestra (1993)
- Triple Concerto for violin, viola, cello and string orchestra "Concerto for Three" (1994)
- Five Fragments to Pictures of Hieronymus Bosch for tenor, violin, trombone, harpsichord, timpani and string orchestra (On texts by Aeschylus) "to Vladimir Spivakov" (1994)

== Choral music ==
- Nagasaki, oratorio (1958)
- Songs of War and Peace, cantata (Russian: Кантата «Песни войны и мира», Kantata Pesni voyny i mira)
- Voices of Nature (1972)
- Requiem (1974–75)
- Minnesang for 52 voices (1981)
- Seid nüchtern und wachet... (Faust Cantata) (1983)
- Three Sacred Hymns (1983–84)
- Concerto for Mixed Choir (Концерт для смешанного хора, 1984–85)
- Psalms of Repentance (1988)

== Chamber music ==
- Sonata No. 1 for violin and piano (1963; orchestrated, 1968; In 2004 Stephen Baynes choreographed a ballet, Unspoken Dialogues, on this music (premiered at The Australian Ballet).
- Dialogue for cello and 7 instruments (1965)
- String Quartet No. 1 (1966)
- Serenade for violin, clarinet, double-bass, piano and percussion (1968)
- Sonata No. 2 for violin and piano "Quasi una sonata" (1968; orchestrated, 1987)
- Canon in Memoriam Igor Stravinsky for string quartet (1971)
- Suite in the Old Style for violin and piano or harpsichord (1972)
- Gratulationsrondo for violin and piano (1973)
- Hymn I for cello, harp and timpani (1974)
- Hymn II for cello and double-bass (1974)
- Hymn III for cello, bassoon, harpsichord and bells or timpani (1974)
- Hymn IV for cello, bassoon, double-bass, harpsichord, harp, timpani and bells (1974–1979)
- Prelude in Memoriam Dmitri Shostakovich for 2 violins (1975)
- Cantus Perpetuus for keyboard instrument and percussion (1975)
- Piano Quintet (1972–76)
- Stille Nacht, arr. for violin and piano (1978)
- Sonata No. 1 for cello and piano (1978)
- Stille Musik for violin and cello (1979)
- Hommage to Stravinsky, Prokofiev and Shostakovich for piano six hands (1979) [Based on "Chinese March" from The Nightingale, Humoresque Scherzo and Polka from The Golden Age.]
- Three Madrigals for soprano, violin, viola, double bass, vibraphone, and harpsichord (1981)
- String Quartet No. 2 (1981)
- Septet for flute, two clarinets, violin, viola, cello and harpsichord or organ (1981–1982)
- Course of life (Lebenslauf) for four metronomes, piano and three percussionists (1982) "to Wilfried Brennecke and John Cage"

String Quartet No. 3
Performed by the Canto String Quartet (Eduardo Canto Arce and Guillem Cabre Salagre – violins, Marton Vineter – viola, Teodora Nedyalkova – cello) at Lutherse Kerk, Groningen, Netherlands, 16 December 2013

- String Quartet No. 3 (1983)
- Sound and Echo (Schall und Hall) for trombone and organ (1983)
- String Trio (1985, also arranged as Piano Trio, 1992) – shares a theme with the Cello Concerto No. 1 from 1986
- Quartet for piano and strings (1988)
- String Quartet No. 4 (1989)
- Madrigal in Memoriam Oleg Kagan for solo violin or cello (1990)
- Musica nostalgica for cello and piano (1992)
- Peer Gynt: Epiloque for cello, piano and tape (1993)
- Sonata No. 2 for cello and piano (1994)
- Sonata No. 3 for violin and piano (1994)
- Variations for string quartet (1997)

== Solo instrumental ==
- Fuga for solo violin (1953)
- Six Preludes for piano (1953–1954)
- Variations for piano (1954–1955)
- Prelude and Fugue for piano (1963)
- Improvisation and Fugue for piano (1965)
- Variations on one chord for piano (1965)
- Potok (Stream), electronic composition (1969)
- Eight Pieces for piano (1971) Dedicated to his son Andrei
- Cadenza to Mozart's Piano Concerto in C minor, K. 491 (first movement) (1975)
- Two Cadenzas to Beethoven's Violin Concerto in D major, Op. 61 for solo violin, 10 violins and timpani (1975–1977)
- Two Short Pieces for organ (1980)
- Cadenzas to Mozart's Piano Concerto in C, K. 467 (first and second movements) (1980)
- A Paganini for solo violin (1982)
- Cadenza to Mozart's Piano Concerto in C major, K. 503 (first movement) (1983)
- Two Cadenzas to Mozart's Bassoon Concerto in B♭ major, K. 191 (1983)
- Piano Sonata No. 1 (1987–88)
- Klingende Buchstaben for solo cello (1988)
- Madrigal in Memoriam Oleg Kagan, first version for violin solo (1990)
- Madrigal in Memoriam Oleg Kagan, second version for cello solo (1990)
- Three Fragments for harpsichord (1990)
- Five Aphorisms for piano (1990)
- Piano Sonata No. 2 (1990)
- Cadenzas to Mozart's Piano Concerto in B♭ major, K. 39 (first and third movements) (1990)
- For the 90th Birthday of Alfred Schlee for viola solo (1991)
- Piano Sonata No. 3 (1992)
- Improvisation for solo cello (1993)
- Sonatina for piano four hands (1995)

== Operas ==
- Life with an Idiot, opera in 2 acts, libretto by Viktor Yerofeyev (1992)
- Historia von D. Johann Fausten, opera in 3 acts and an epilogue, libretto by Jörg Morgener (Jürgen Köchel) and Alfred Schnittke (1991–1994)
- Gesualdo, opera in 7 tableaux, a prologue and an epilogue, libretto by Richard Bletschacher (1993)

== Ballets ==
- Labyrinths (1971), ballet in five episodes for chamber orchestra, libretto by Vladimir Vasilyev.
1. Moderato – Allegretto Scherzando – Meno Mosso – Adagio
2. Moderato
3. Allegretto
4. Agitato
5. Cadenza – Andante – Maestoso
- Der Gelbe Klang (The Yellow Sound) (1973), libretto by Wassily Kandinsky translated into Russian by Schnittke.
- Sketches (1985), ballet in one act. Choreographic fantasia by Andrey Petrov after the themes by Nikolai Gogol.
- Peer Gynt (1988), ballet in three acts by John Neumeier based on Henrik Ibsen's drama.

== Soundtracks ==
- Adventures of a Dentist, film directed by Elem Klimov (1965, material reused in Suite in the Old Style and Symphony No. 1)
- The Stars of the Day, film directed by Igor Talankin (1966)
- Commissar, film directed by Aleksandr Askoldov (1967, released 1988), based on one of Vasily Grossman's first short stories, "In the Town of Berdichev"
- The Glass Harmonica, animated film directed by Andrei Khrzhanovsky (1968, much material reused in second violin sonata)
- The Waltz, TV film directed by Viktor Titow (1969)
- The Seagull, film directed by Yuli Karasik (1970)
- Belorussian Station, film directed by Andrei Smirnov (1970)
- Sport, Sport, Sport, film directed by Elem Klimov (1971)
- You and Me, film directed by Larisa Shepitko (1971)
- Butterfly, animated film directed by Andrei Khrzhanovsky (1973)
- My Past and Thoughts, TV Movie (1973)
- Agony, two-part film directed by Elem Klimov (1974, main theme reused in the finale of the Second Cello Concerto)
- Rikki-Tikki-Tavi, live action film directed by Aleksandr Zguridi and Nana Kldiashvili (1975)
- Clowns and Children (Clowns und Kinder), short film directed by Alexander Mitta (1976)
- How Czar Peter the Great Married Off His Moor, film directed by Alexander Mitta (1976)
- The Ascent, film directed by Larisa Shepitko (1977)
- Story of an Unknown Actor, film directed by Aleksandr Zarkhi (1977)
- Father Sergius (1978)
- Little Tragedies, three-part TV film directed by Mikhail Schweitzer (1979)
- Air Crew, film directed by Alexander Mitta (1979)
- The Story of Voyages, also known as The Fairytale of the Wanderings, film directed by Alexander Mitta (1982)
- Dead Souls, five-part TV miniseries directed by Mikhail Schweitzer (1984)
- The Last Days of Saint Petersburg (1992, new score for 1927 film The End of St. Petersburg, co-written with the composer's son Andrey)
- The Master and Margarita, film directed by Yuri Kara (1994)
