= Piano Quintet (Schnittke) =

1976/1979 piano quintet/orchestration by Alfred Schnittke

- by Alfred Schnittke
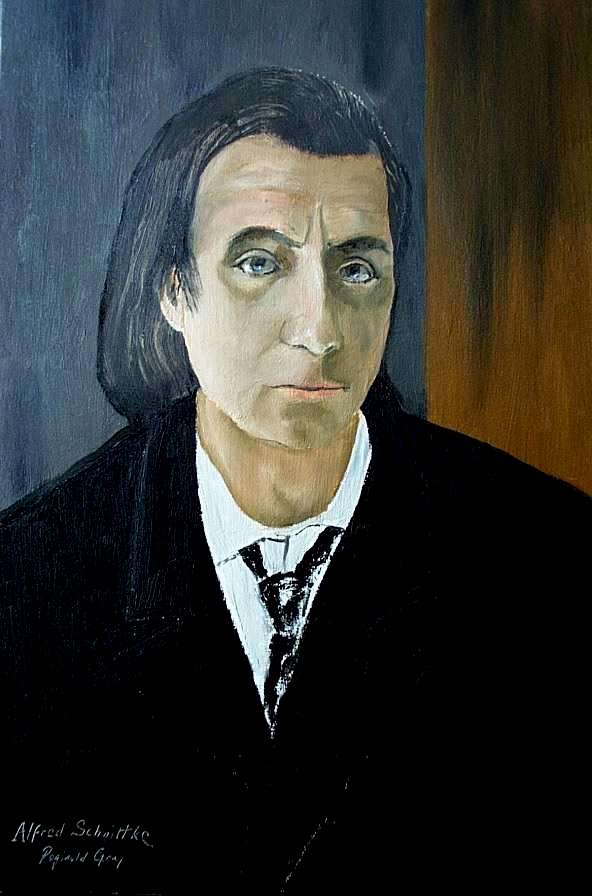
- Portrait of Alfred Schnittke by Reginald Gray (1972)
- Composed: 1972–1976
- Dedication: In memory of my mother Mariya Iosifovna Vogel
- Publisher: Edition Peters; Sovietsky kompozitor; Hans Sikorski Musikverlage
- Duration: 25–29 minutes
- Movements: 5
- Scoring: Piano; string quartet

Premiere
- Date: September 1976
- Location: Tbilisi, Georgian SSR
- Performers: Nodar Gabunia; Georgian String Quartet

In Memoriam...
- by Alfred Schnittke
- Composed: 1977–1978
- Publisher: Edition Peters
- Duration: 25–29 minutes
- Movements: 5
- Scoring: Symphony orchestra

Premiere
- Date: December 20, 1979
- Location: Large Hall of the Moscow Conservatory; Moscow, Russian SFSR
- Conductor: Gennady Rozhdestvensky
- Performers: Moscow Philharmonic Orchestra

The Piano Quintet by Alfred Schnittke is a five-movement work for piano and string quartet composed 1972–1976. It was later arranged for symphony orchestra at the request of Gennady Rozhdestvensky and retitled In Memoriam...

When Schnittke's mother died in 1972, he decided to compose a work in her memory. Initially he devised a number of ideas, many of which were either later used in his Requiem, which he had been working on concurrently with the Piano Quintet, or were discarded. Progress on the quintet's first movement moved along rapidly, but soon reached an impasse after its completion. He did not resume work on the Piano Quintet until 1975, by which point his music had changed significantly. He completed and premiered it in 1976.

Rozhdestvensky later heard a recording of the Piano Quintet, which he felt needed to be transcribed for orchestra in order to fully realize its potential. Schnittke at first responded noncommittally to his suggestion, but eventually agreed to make an orchestral version, which he completed in 1979. The premiere of In Memoriam... followed on December 20, 1979.

The Piano Quintet and In Memoriam... are both considered among the pivotal works in Schnittke's career.

== History ==
=== Background ===
Mariya Iosifovna Schnittke (née Vogel), Alfred Schnittke's mother, was born to a family descended from Volga German peasantry that arrived in the Russian Empire during the reign of Catherine the Great. Vogel's father, Josef, was a woodworker; her mother, Pauline, was a devout Catholic who only spoke German. Mariya worked as a German language teacher and as a proofreader for Neues Leben, a newspaper serving the German community in Engels, Saratov Oblast. She met journalist, translator, and CPSU member Harry Viktorovich Schnittke, the composer's father, in 1932. Mariya continued working at the newspaper until the mass deportation of Germans from Engels in 1941.

Mariya Schnittke's death from a stroke on September 17, 1972, left the composer distraught. She was buried at Vvedenskoye Cemetery.

=== Composition ===
Soon after his mother's death, Alfred Schnittke began to sketch out the work that eventually became his Piano Quintet. In an interview the composer gave in 1980, he said that his desire to write a "simple, but earnest" musical memorial for his mother posed "an almost insoluble problem" to him. He said that the first movement had been composed "almost without effort", but further work was impeded:

I was unable to continue because I had to take what I wrote from imaginary spaces defined in terms of sound and put it into psychological space as defined by life, where excruciating pain seems almost unserious, and one must fight for the right to use dissonance, consonance, and assonance.

By the time Schnittke resumed work on the quintet's subsequent movements in autumn 1975, he had already completed and premiered his First Symphony; his attitude towards composition had altered significantly in the interim. "Something in the air had changed", he later said.

During the composition of the Piano Quintet, Schnittke began turning to Catholicism for comfort; he eventually converted on June 18, 1983. His mother had been baptized a Catholic at birth, but was an atheist. Nevertheless, Schnittke later said he became a Catholic because of her, adding that he "had to continue where he belong[ed]". He also became a believer in predestination. He said that he had received "help from above" when completing the Piano Quintet's finale.

According to the sketches, he initially conceived of the work as "an instrumental requiem", with each of its five movements corresponding to the Introit, Kyrie eleison, Dies irae, Benedictus, and Agnus Dei of the Requiem Mass. In addition, they contain various references to events and dates in the life of Schnittke's mother, as well as unrealized ideas that would have incorporated the musical monograms of Dmitri Shostakovich and Arnold Schoenberg within the quintet. Some of the Piano Quintet's themes were originally intended for his Requiem, which was sketched out together with the Piano Quintet. Schnittke called the Requiem an "offshoot" or the "waste matter" of the Piano Quintet and that the latter work turned out "rather different" than he had anticipated. He completed it in spring 1976.

The Piano Quintet was first published by Edition Peters in 1976, followed by Sovietsky kompozitor in 1979. For a time, it was one of the few of Schnittke's works permitted to be published in the Eastern Bloc.

Schnittke disdained having his music encored in concert. After a 1990s performance of the Piano Quintet played by his wife, Irina, and violinist Mark Lubotsky, they played its finale as an encore to satisfy audience demand. "Why did you do that?", he asked Lubotsky angrily. "No encores whatsoever. Especially in this music. After all, you only die once."

=== Orchestration ===
In an interview with Alexander Ivashkin, Gennady Rozhdestvensky talked about the first time he heard the Piano Quintet:

I recall the striking impression I had of listening to a recording of [Schnittke]'s Piano Quintet at a meeting of the Melodiya Studio Artistic Board. The impact of the music was so powerful that I immediately phoned [Schnittke] at home and told him that, in my opinion, the work required a symphonic solution. He told me that for the moment he had no idea about that, but that he would try to do so. And he did so rather quickly. I conducted In Memoriam... and then recorded it.

Originally, Schnittke had attempted to arrange the Piano Quintet into a piano concerto. Unable to realize this conception, he instead arranged it for orchestra, with the piano part scored for winds and percussion. The string parts were transferred to a string orchestra, but otherwise left unchanged.

== Music ==
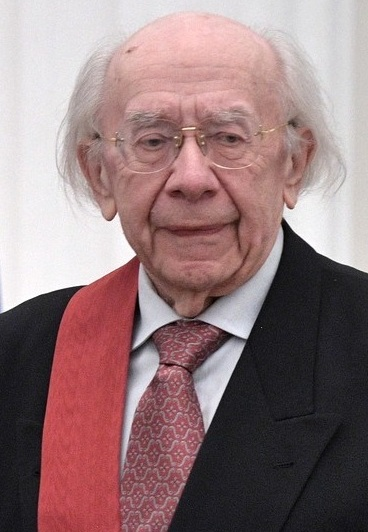
Gennady Rozhdestvensky (pictured here in 2017) suggested to Schnittke an orchestral realization of the Piano Quintet

The Piano Quintet and In Memoriam... both comprise the same five movements:

1. Moderato (attacca)
2. Tempo di Valse (attacca)
3. Andante (attacca)
4. Lento (attacca)
5. Moderato pastorale

A thirty-measure pianissimo opens the first movement, which leads to a crescendo that grows out of tone clusters over a throbbing pedal point. Alexander Demchenko described the second movement as sounding like a "frankly sentimental and old-fashioned 'waltz' ... conjur[ing] up a haze of fragile memories from the days of 78 RPM gramophone records and touchingly heartfelt outpourings, spiritualized in this instance by the tracing of the BACH motif." Schnittke said that the third and fourth movements were "based on real experiences of grief", but declined to explain further. He said the finale was a "mirror passacaglia" with a theme that is repeated fourteen times while other musical events occur as "only ... fading shadows of a tragic sensation that has already fled".

A typical performance of the Piano Quintet and In Memoriam... takes approximately 25–29 minutes.

=== Instrumentation ===
For In Memoriam..., the orchestra consists of the following instruments:

Woodwinds
3 flutes (3rd doubling piccolo and alto flute)
3 oboes (3rd doubling English horn)
3 clarinets (3rd doubling bass clarinet)
3 bassoons (3rd doubling contrabassoon)
Brass
4 French horns
4 trumpets
4 trombones
1 tuba

Percussion
timpani
2 tam-tams
tubular bells
snare drum
glockenspiel
vibraphone
marimba
Keyboards
2 pianos
celesta
harpsichord
organ

Strings
harp
electric guitar
1st violins
2nd violins
violas
cellos
double basses

== Premieres ==
The Piano Quintet was premiered in Tbilisi, Georgian SSR, by Nodar Gabunia and the Georgian String Quartet in September 1976. The orchestral version, In Memoriam..., was premiered on December 20, 1979, at the Large Hall of the Moscow Conservatory by the Moscow Philharmonic Orchestra conducted by Gennady Rozhdestvensky.

== Reception ==
The Piano Quintet has been called the "best of [Schnittke's] memorial works" and a defining point of his career. A critic for the Star Tribune said the work was full of "striking touches" and that its "heavy wit" were indebted to the music of Shostakovich and Gustav Mahler.

Some of Schnittke's friends and colleagues disapproved of the Piano Quintet, including Sofia Gubaidulina and Edison Denisov. The latter referred to it as a "bad work" that allowed Schnittke to obtain official support, although he maintained that he was "still a very good composer". Ralph Evans of the Fine Arts Quartet called it "one of the most depressing pieces ever written".
