= Viola Concerto (Schnittke) =

1985 concerto by Alfred Schnittke

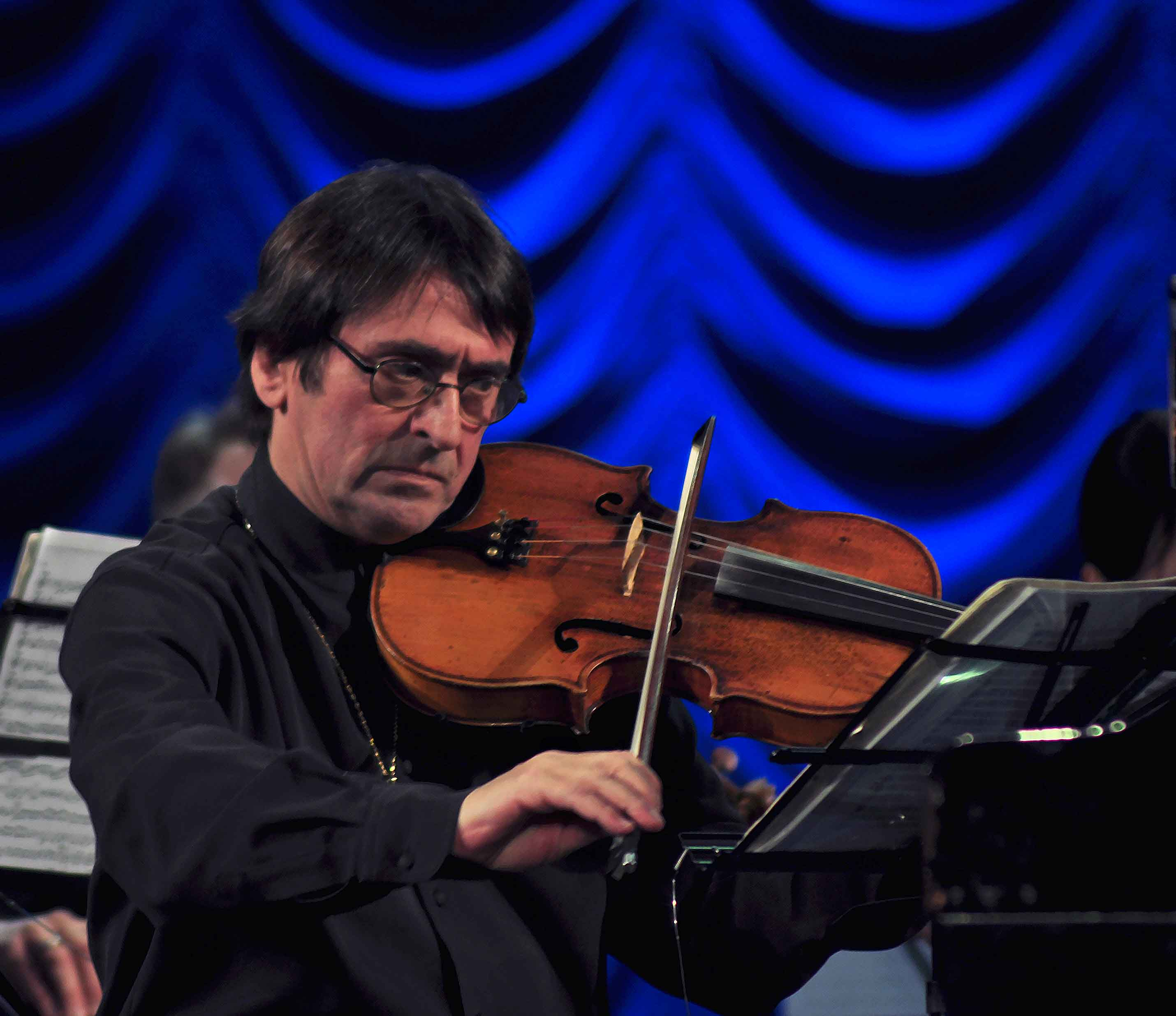
Dedicatee of the Viola Concerto, Yuri Bashmet

The Concerto for Viola and Orchestra is a viola concerto by Soviet and German composer Alfred Schnittke. It was written in the summer of 1985 (Schnittke's final work on it was on 11 July 1985, just ten days before he suffered his first stroke). Its dedicatee is viola player Yuri Bashmet, who gave the work its world premiere with the Royal Concertgebouw Orchestra conducted by Lukas Vis at the Concertgebouw in Amsterdam on 9 January 1986.

== Structure and style ==
The concerto is scored for solo viola and an orchestra of:

3 flutes (no. 2 doubling piccolo, no. 3 doubling alto flute), 3 oboes (no. 3 doubling cor anglais), 3 clarinets in B♭ (no. 2 doubling clarinet in E♭, no. 3 doubling bass clarinet), 3 bassoons (no. 3 doubling contrabassoon), 4 horns, 4 trumpets, 4 trombones, tuba, timpani, percussion (6 players), harp, celesta, harpsichord, piano, and 8 each of violas, cellos and double basses. Note that violins are absent.

The movements are as follows:

1. Largo
2. Allegro molto
3. Largo

Depending on the precise tempi chosen a performance typically lasts between 35 and 40 minutes.

Almost the entire structure of the concerto is based on a 6 note motif derived from the first 6 letters of the German spelling of Yuri Bashmet's surname (Baschmet). In German and French music letter notation the note names B–A–Es–C–H–Mi correspond to the notes B♭–A– E♭–C–B(♮)–E(♮) in the more familiar Anglo-Saxon notation.

Each movement is longer than its predecessor, with the final movement being almost as long as the previous two together. The first commences with a declamation from the soloist, echoed by the orchestra, in which the "Bashmet motif" is first heard. This is followed by an extended version of the declamation culminating in a fortissimo chord from the orchestra. The movement closes with a delicate cadence. The second movement begins with frenetic arpeggios, including multiple double stopping, from the viola. During the movement Schnittke interweaves ideas from the first movement with an array of other musical references - dance-band music, film music, Soviet military marches - typical of Schnittke's brand of polystylism. Further iterations of the opening music lead to the viola's cadenza and, finally, a march-like theme which slowly fades out. The final movement returns to the slow tempo of the first. Its mood has been described as "bleak" and "funereal", the music formed of disjointed fragments from the first two movements.

Schnittke himself commented on the music's structure as follows:

"Like a premonition of what was to come," (referring to his stroke soon after finishing the Concerto), "the music took on the character of a restless chase through life (in the second movement) and that of a slow and sad overview of life on the threshold of death (in the third movement)."

== Discography ==
- Alto - Yuri Bashmet, USSR Ministry of Culture Orchestra, Gennady Rozhdestvensky (conductor)
- Ambroisie - Antoine Tamestit, Warsaw Philharmonic, Dmitrij Kitajenko (cond.)
- BIS - Nobuko Imai, Malmö Symphony Orchestra, Lev Markiz (cond.)
- ECM - Kim Kashkashian, Bonn Beethovenhalle Orchestra, Dennis Russell Davies (cond.)
- Ondine - David Aaron Carpenter, Philharmonia Orchestra, Christoph Eschenbach (cond.)
- RCA - Yuri Bashmet, London Symphony Orchestra, Mstislav Rostropovich (cond.)
- Warner Classics - Tabea Zimmermann, Jerusalem Symphony Orchestra, David Shallon
