= Symphony No. 3 (Schnittke) =

Symphony by Alfred Schnittke

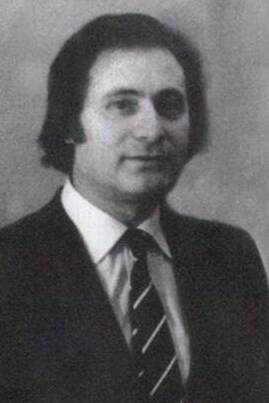
Alfred Schnittke

Alfred Schnittke's Symphony No. 3 is his fourth composition in the symphonic form, completed in 1981. The work was premiered in Leipzig on 5 November 1981, with Kurt Masur conducting the Leipzig Gewandhausorchester in Schnittke's presence.

It was first recorded in 1984 by Gennadi Rozhdestvensky with the USSR Ministry of Culture Symphony Orchestra. Further recordings appeared in the 1990s with the Royal Stockholm Philharmonic Orchestra under Eri Klas and in 2015 with the Rundfunk-Sinfonieorchester Berlin under Vladimir Jurowski (PENTATONE PTC 5186485).

== Movements ==
The symphony is in four movements: an opening Moderato, followed by an Allegro and a relatively brief movement marked Allegro pesante, with the lengthy finale marked Adagio.

1. Moderato
2. Allegro
3. Allegro pesante
4. Adagio

At around 50 minutes, it is Schnittke's third longest symphony, after the First and Second Symphonies. It shares an intensity similar to the First Symphony, but unlike that work has a more traditional form, and contains no direct quotations. Nonetheless, the influence of many composers hangs over the piece (Richard Taruskin called the opening of the work "Wagner's Rheingold prelude, cubed and cubed again."), not merely stylistically but in Schnittke's repeated use of composers' initials. These include Bach, Handel, Mozart, Schoenberg, Stockhausen and Hans Werner Henze.

Further use is made of transposed words later in the work: in the third movement the word "das Böse" ("the Evil") appears as an eight-note tone row (D, A, E♭, A♭, B♭, E, E♭, E), with the B–A–C–H monogram dominating the final movement.

== Instrumentation ==
The symphony is scored for a large orchestra consisting of the following instruments:

Woodwinds

3 flutes (all doubling piccolo)
4 oboes (4th doubling cor anglais)
4 clarinets (3rd doubling E♭ clarinet, 4th doubling bass clarinet)
4 bassoons (4th doubling contrabassoon)

Brass

6 horns
4 trumpets
4 trombones (4th doubling contrabass trombone)
1 tuba

Percussion (6 players)

timpani

3 tom toms
drums
bass drum
suspended cymbal
2 tam tams
tubular bells

Keyboards

vibraphone
marimba
glockenspiel
piano
harpsichord
organ
celesta

Strings

electric guitar
bass guitar
2 harps

16 violins I
16 violins II
12 violas
12 cellos
10 double basses
