= Symphony No. 7 (Schnittke) =

1993 symphony by Alfred Schnittke

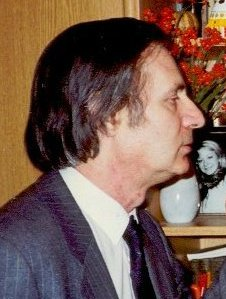
Alfred Schnittke in 1989

Russian composer Alfred Schnittke's Symphony No. 7 was composed in 1993. It is dedicated to conductor Kurt Masur who gave its world premiere performance in New York with the New York Philharmonic Orchestra on 10 February 1994.

== Movements ==
The movements are as follows:

1. Andante – attacca –
2. Largo
3. Allegro

The playing time is approximately 23 minutes.

The symphony opens with an extended (42 bars) violin solo. This is eventually joined by the other string instruments in an expansive, open, chorale-like structure which, nevertheless, maintains a mysterious and dissonant atmosphere throughout. Towards the end of the movement the solo violin theme reappears, this time for the first violins together. The theme is accompanied by a sustained chord from the second violins which continues through to the beginning of the second movement which is played without a break (i.e. attacca).

In contrast to the string-focused first movement, the brief second movement (just two and a half minutes in the recording by the BBC National Orchestra of Wales) concentrates on woodwind and brass. The mood is very different from that of the first movement: blocks of cluster chords are interspersed with sharp interjections from the woodwind and brass, and long periods of silence.

The final movement is nearly as long as the first two combined. The woodwind figurations from the second movement become increasingly significant before the music breaks down in a similar way to the music of the first movement and finale of the previous year's sixth symphony. A melody in the horns, invoking Bruckner, suddenly breaks through in an attempt to give the movement some direction, but the music soon breaks down again, becoming stuttering and texturally thinner. Finally, the Bruckner-like horn theme returns on tuba, contrabassoon and double bass but this time in the guise of a funereal waltz and the symphony comes to a close.

== Instrumentation ==
The symphony is scored for an orchestra of:

Woodwinds

3 flutes (2nd doubling piccolo, 3rd doubling alto flute)
3 oboes (3rd doubling English horn)
3 clarinets (2nd doubling E♭ clarinet, 3rd doubling bass clarinet)
3 bassoons (3rd doubling contrabassoon)

Brass

4 horns
3 trumpets
3 trombones
1 tuba

Percussion (3 players)

timpani

3 triangles
bongos
tom toms
snare drum
2 bass drums
3 cymbals
gong
tam tams
tubular bells

Keyboards

harpsichord
piano

Strings

harp
solo violin

12 violins I
12 violins II
9 violas
8 cellos
6 double basses

== Recordings ==
The symphony has had three recordings:

- The BBC National Orchestra of Wales conducted by Tadaaki Otaka for the BIS label
- The Russian State Symphony Orchestra conducted by Valery Polyansky for the Chandos label
- The NDR Symphony Orchestra conducted by Gennady Rozhdestvensky (recording of the live performance in 1999)
