= Symphony No. 8 (Schnittke) =

1994 symphony by Alfred Schnittke

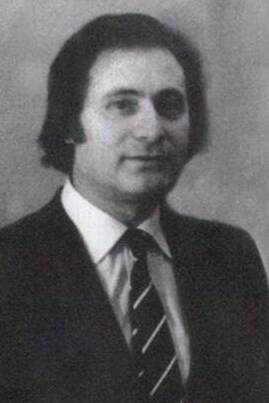
Alfred Schnittke

Russian composer Alfred Schnittke's Symphony No. 8 was composed in 1994. Its dedicatee Gennady Rozhdestvensky conducted the Royal Stockholm Philharmonic Orchestra in the symphony's premiere in Stockholm on 10 November 1994.

== Movements ==
The movements are as follows:

1. Moderato
2. Allegro moderato
3. Lento
4. Allegro moderato
5. Lento

The playing time is approximately 35 minutes.

The first movement begins with a simple 8-bar melody played on the horns. The movement is based on an ostinato of twenty-two transposed repetitions of this melody passed backwards and forwards between different groups of instruments.

The first Allegro moderato acts as an intermezzo. Initially it seems to be a continuation of the ostinato from the first movement but fast crotchets, flourishes, dissonant chords and increasingly dense tone clusters intrude.

The dominating movement of the symphony is the central Lento which takes up nearly half the length of the entire work. Its slow theme, initially heard on the strings, evokes the music of various other composers important to Schnittke, including Bruckner, Mahler, Wagner and Shostakovich.

The second Allegro moderato commences with fanfares and, in contrast with the mood of much of the rest of the symphony, attempts at being sprightly but ultimately descends into echoes of Shostakovich-like bleakness.

The final Lento (very short at just two minutes) is effectively a coda dedicated solely to the gradual building of a tone cluster of all of the notes of the C major scale spread across more than three octaves which gradually fades.

== Instrumentation ==
The symphony is scored for an orchestra of:

Woodwinds

3 flutes (3rd doubling piccolo)
3 oboes (3rd doubling English horn)
3 clarinets (2nd doubling E♭ clarinet, 3rd doubling bass clarinet)
3 bassoons (3rd doubling contrabassoon)

Brass

4 horns
4 trumpets
3 trombones
1 tuba

Percussion (3 players)

timpani

bass drum
3 suspended cymbal
3 tam-tam
tubular bells

Keyboards

glockenspiel
vibraphone
celesta
harpsichord
piano

Strings

2 harps

12 violins I
12 violins II
10 violas
8 cellos
6 double basses

== Recordings ==
- BIS – Norrköping Symphony Orchestra, Lü Jia (conductor)
- Chandos – The Russian State Symphony Orchestra, Valery Polyansky (cond.)
- Chandos – The Royal Stockholm Philharmonic Orchestra, Gennady Rozhdestvensky (cond.)
