= Symphony No. 6 (Schnittke) =

1992 symphony by Alfred Schnittke

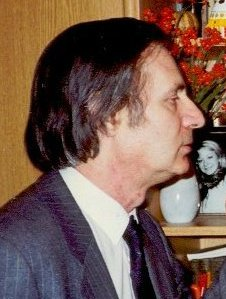
Alfred Schnittke in 1989

Symphony No. 6 by Russian composer Alfred Schnittke was composed in 1992. It was commissioned by cellist and conductor Mstislav Rostropovich and the National Symphony Orchestra of Washington, who together gave its first performance in Moscow on 25 September 1993.

The playing time is approximately 35 minutes.

== Movements ==
The movements are as follows:

1. Allegro moderato
2. Presto
3. Adagio – attacca –
4. Allegro vivace

The composition of the symphony coincided with Schnittke's work on the orchestration of the first two acts of his opera Historia von D. Johann Fausten. Hence there are similarities between the instrumentation and thematic material of both. Following performances in the United States in 1994, Schnittke made changes to the score, reducing the number of silent bars and making minor alterations to the orchestration.

The first movement opens with a built up chord which shatters into fragments from which themes on viola and then on trombones emerge, the latter stating a chorale-like theme reminiscent of Bruckner. The fragments gradually come together before collapsing again. Stabbing motifs intervene which become more agitated until the opening chord returns to bring the movement to a close.

The second movement is effectively a scherzo. Beginning with echoes of the stabbing motif from the first movement it features prominent roles for the four trumpets and contains references to Shostakovich's Fourth and Sixth Symphonies.

The Adagio is based on a 12-note tone row, first heard on the strings, whose harmony consists in permutations of itself. The bass clarinet, supported by two bassoons, picks out four notes from the tone row in a reference to the overture to Wagner's Tristan and Isolde. As the movement comes to a conclusion one of the more sombre permutations of the tone row becomes prominent and the movement concludes in an atmosphere of pathos.

The final movement continues on from the third without a break (i.e. attacca). As with other pieces by Schnittke (for instance the fourth violin concerto) the finale draws upon the previous three movements for much of its material. It begins with a persistent four note motif to which previous themes, less fragmented than previously, are joined suggesting the unity of the symphony as a whole. The stabbing motif from the second movement returns. It is joined by a more urgent version of the four note motif from the beginning of the finale, together driving the music towards a climax in which the themes again shatter into fragments from which the tolling of a bell emerges to end the symphony.

== Instrumentation ==
The symphony is scored for an orchestra of:

Woodwinds

3 flutes (2nd and 3rd doubling piccolo)
3 oboes (3rd doubling English horn)
3 clarinets (2nd doubling E♭ clarinet, 3rd doubling bass clarinet)
3 bassoons (3rd doubling contrabassoon)

Brass

4 horns
4 trumpets
4 trombones
1 tuba

Percussion (3 players)

timpani

triangles
snare drum
bass drums
suspended cymbals
tam tams
tubular bells

Keyboards

piano

Strings

harp

12 violins I
12 violins II
10 violas
8 cellos
6 double basses

== Recordings ==
The symphony has had two recordings:

- The BBC National Orchestra of Wales conducted by Tadaaki Otaka for the BIS label
- The Russian State Symphony Orchestra conducted by Valery Polyansky for the Chandos label
