= Symphony No. 0 (Schnittke) =

1957 student symphony by Alfred Schnittke

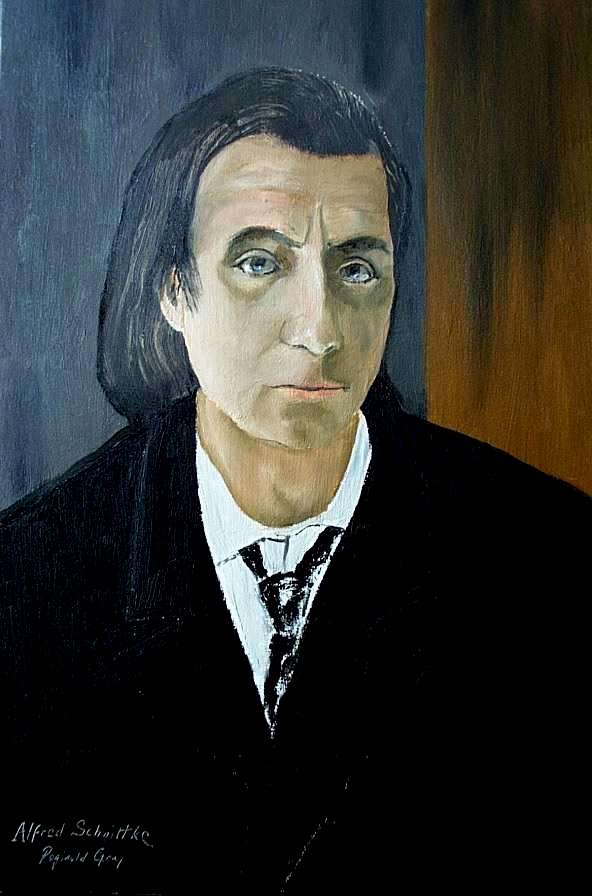
Portrait of Alfred Schnittke by Reginald Gray (1972)

Symphony No. 0 by Russian composer Alfred Schnittke was composed in 1956–57 whilst Schnittke was a student at the Moscow Conservatory. It was given its first performance in 1957 by the Moscow Conservatory Symphony Orchestra conducted by Algis Zhiuratis. Dmitri Shostakovich and Dmitry Kabalevsky were both present at the premiere.

== Music ==
The symphony is scored for an orchestra of 3 flutes (third doubling piccolo), 2 oboes (second doubling cor anglais), 3 clarinets, 2 bassoons, 4 horns, 3 trumpets, 3 trombones, tuba, percussion, harpsichord, piano, and strings.

The movements are as follows:

1. Allegro ma non troppo
2. Allegro vivace
3. Andante
4. Allegro

The playing time is approximately 40 minutes.

The compositional style has been likened to that of Nikolai Myaskovsky, who was the teacher of Schnittke's composition teacher Evgeny Golubev, and to that of Shostakovich, Paul Hindemith and Carl Orff.

Apart from the innovative use of the harpsichord in the orchestra, which was to become a signature of Schnittke's later music, the symphony has been criticised for its lack of originality, including "imitation" of Shostakovich and "borrowed gestures".

== Recordings ==
The symphony has been recorded by the Cape Philharmonic Orchestra conducted by Owain Arwel Hughes for the BIS record label.
