= Symphony No. 1 (Schnittke) =

1974 symphony by Alfred Schnittke

- by Alfred Schnittke
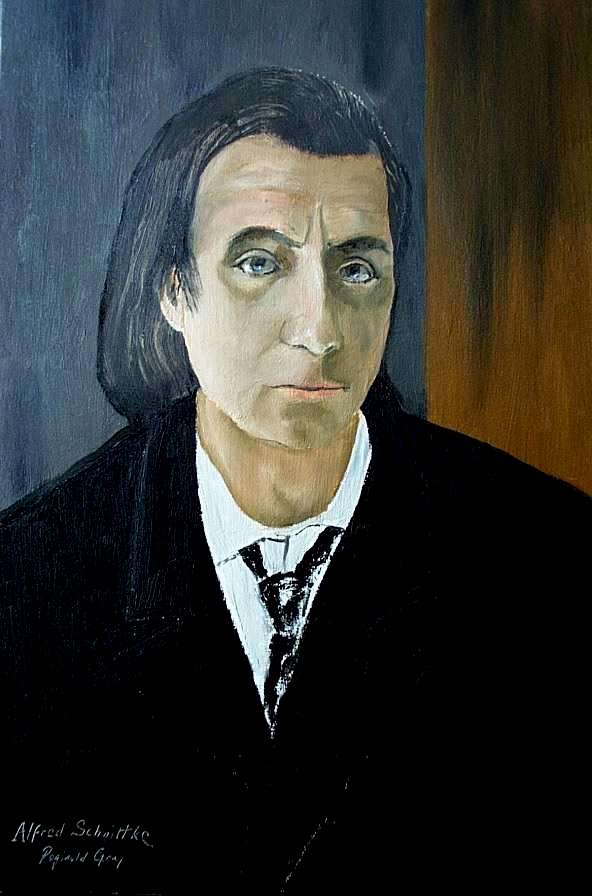
- Portrait of Alfred Schnittke by Reginald Gray (1972)
- Genre: Polystylism
- Composed: 1969–1974
- Duration: approx. 60 minutes
- Movements: Four
- Scoring: Large orchestra

Premiere
- Date: 9 February 1974
- Location: Gorky
- Conductor: Gennady Rozhdestvensky
- Performers: Gorky Philharmonic Orchestra

The Symphony No. 1 by Alfred Schnittke was composed between 1969 and 1974. It is scored for a large orchestra. The symphony is recognised as one of Schnittke's most extreme essays in aleatoric music. From the outset the piece is loud, brash, and chaotic, and it quotes motifs from all parts of the Western classical tradition.

Schnittke includes a choreography for the musicians themselves, and in a manner similar to Haydn's Farewell Symphony, they leave and re-enter the stage at points marked in the score.

== Music ==
The symphony is in four movements:

1. Senza tempo. Moderato
2. Allegretto
3. Lento
4. Lento. Allegro

The second movement opens with a faux-Baroque rondo which is soon usurped by a Mahlerian intervention on clarinet. This too is soon eclipsed by a sleazy percussive theme. There are also direct quotations from Tchaikovsky's B♭-minor Piano Concerto, Johann Strauss Jr's 'Vienna Woods' waltz, Chopin's Second Piano Sonata amongst many others. Often the material collides in a manner similar to Charles Ives' music, but as the critic Alex Ross notes, taken to a much greater extreme. Schnittke also includes an extended jazz improvisation sequence for violin and piano in the second movement.

Ross regards it as surprising that the work was ever passed by the Soviet authorities, even though by the 1970s the regime had become less hardline. Schnittke himself noted:

While composing the symphony for four years, I simultaneously worked on the music to M. Romm's film I Believe…. Together with the shooting crew I looked through thousands of meters of documentary film. Gradually they formed in my mind a seemingly chaotic but inwardly orderly chronicle of the 20th century.

Somehow, Ross notes, the authorities saw this as an endorsement of the Soviet regime. He argues that in this piece:

Western musical history is re-created as a barrage of garbled transmissions, a radio receiving many stations on one channel. Despite its veneer of goofiness, this triumph of planned anarchy has a simple and serious effect. It produces the sound of music, rather than music itself—what is overheard by a society that no longer knows how to listen. The society in question need not be Soviet.

The symphony was premiered on 9 February 1974, in Gorky (Nizhny Novgorod). The Gorky Philharmonic Orchestra was conducted by Gennady Rozhdestvensky. The work was published (at least for rental) in 1978. Rozhdestvensky recorded the work in 1987 with the USSR Ministry of Culture Symphony Orchestra for Melodiya Records. A further recording with the Royal Stockholm Philharmonic Orchestra under Leif Segerstam was released in 1994 on BIS Records, and Rozhdestvensky re-recorded the work in 1988 with the Russian State Symphony Orchestra, available on Chandos Records.

Schnittke's score was used by John Neumeier in his 1983 ballet Endstation Sehnsucht (A Streetcar Named Desire, based on the Tennessee Williams play of the same name). Given the resources required to perform the music, a tape recording was used instead of a live orchestra.

== Instrumentation ==
The symphony is scored for a large orchestra:

Woodwinds

4 flute
4 oboes
4 clarinets
3 saxophones
4 bassoons

Brass

4 horns
4 trumpets
4 trombones
1 tuba

Percussion

timpani
xylophone
vibraphone
marimbaphone
tubular bells
bass drum
snare drum
tom-toms
glockenspiel
tam-tam

Keyboards

celesta
piano
harpsichord
organ

Strings

electric guitar
bass guitar
2 harps

strings
