= Derry O'Sullivan =

Irish poet (1944–2025)

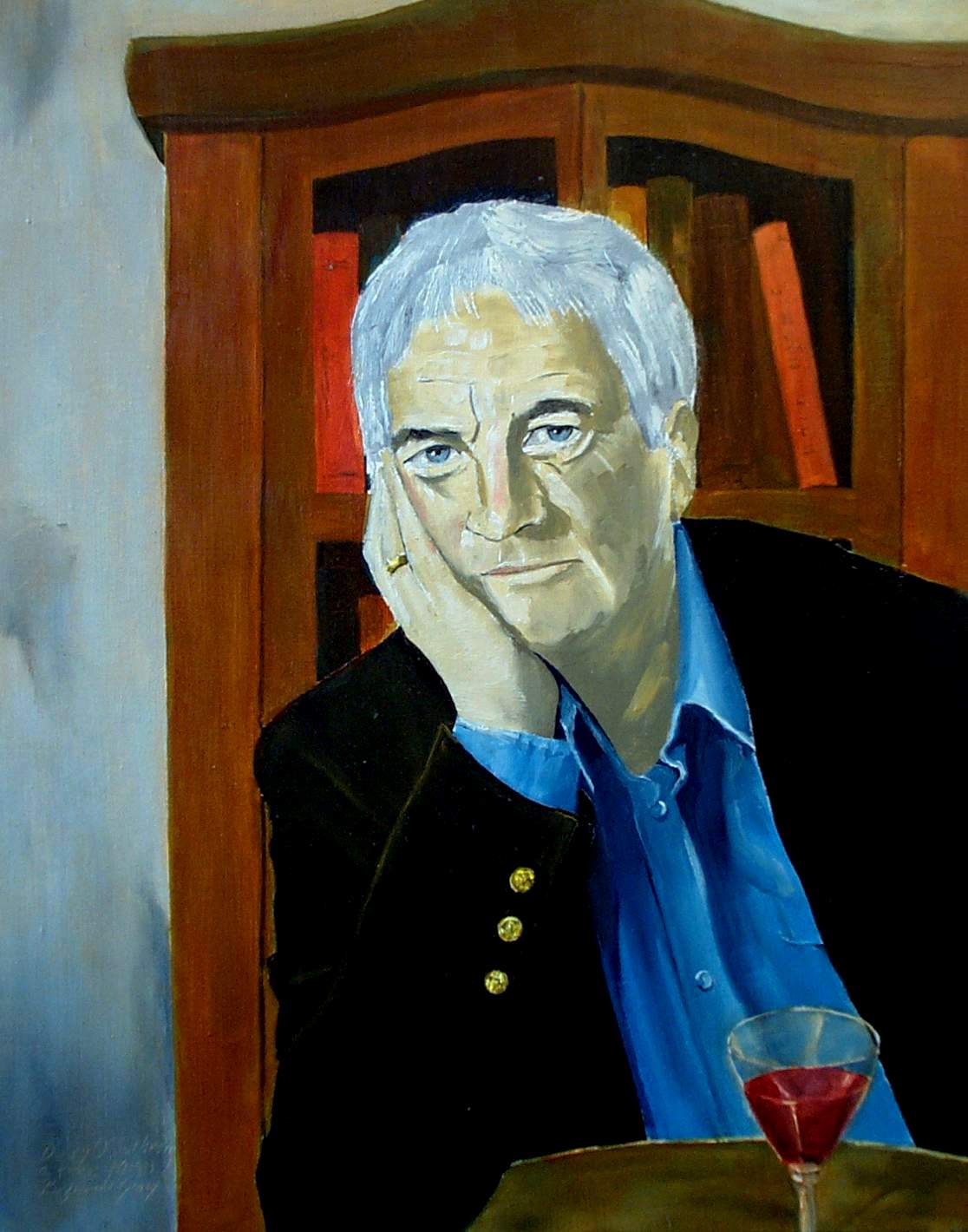
- Portrait of Derry O`Sullivan by Reginald Gray, Paris, 2002
- Born: 1944; Bantry, County Cork, Ireland
- Died: August 2025 (aged 81); Paris, France
- Occupations: Poet, professor
- Writing career
- Language: Irish, French, English

Derry O'Sullivan (1944 – August 2025) was an Irish poet living in Paris, France.

His poetry collections in the Irish language are: "Cá bhfuil do Iudás?" (Dublin, Coiscéim, 1987) - winner of four Oireachtas Literary prizes and the Seán Ó Ríordáin Memorial Prize; "Cá bhfuil Tiarna Talún l'Univers?" (Dublin, Coiscéim, 1994); "An Lá go dTáinig Siad" (Dublin, Coiscéim, 2005), a long poem about the Nazi occupation of Paris, and "An bhfuil cead agam dul amach, más é do thoil é?" (Dublin, Coiscéim, 2009). He has participated in literary festivals in Ireland, France, the US and Canada and his work has been published in numerous literary reviews and anthologies.

== Life and work ==
O'Sullivan was born in 1944 in Bantry, County Cork, Ireland.

His poems have been translated into English and French and several of them can be consulted in Harvard University Library. His work appears in English translation in "The King's English" (Paris, First Impressions, 1987). "En Mal de Fleurs" (Québec, Lèvres Urbaines 30 1988) is a suite of poems written directly in French.

An English translation by Kaarina Hollo of O'Sullivan's poem "Marbhghin 1943: Glaoch ar Liombo" ("Stillborn 1943: Calling Limbo") won the 2012 Times Stephen Spender Prize for poetry translation, a competition open to poems in all languages and from all periods of history.

O'Sullivan's poem 'Blip' was incorporated into the fabric of the Gaelscoil (Irish-medium primary school) in Bantry, County Cork, as part of a public art project in 2014, in collaboration with the artists Cleary&Connolly.

O'Sullivan made the first direct translation of the 10th-Century Irish poem "Cailleach Béara" ("The Lament of the Old Woman of Beare") into French, in collaboration with Jean-Yves Bériou and Martine Joulia, as "Lamentations de la vieille femme de Beare", published in a hand-printed Irish/French bilingual edition (Paris, 1992, 1995) and revised in 2006 (Éditions de l'Escampette).

A former priest, O'Sullivan was married with three children. He taught English at the Sorbonne (University of Paris), the Institut Catholique de Paris (The Catholic University of Paris) and the Institut Supérieur d'Electronique de Paris. He was a senior examiner for the International Baccalaureate. Among other projects he co-founded the Festival Franco-Anglais de Poésie.

The late Reginald Gray, O'Sullivan's friend, provided the cover art of three of his poetry collections, as well the portrait on the right. Other collaborations with visual artists include "Ceamara/Camera", a bilingual Irish/English poem, reply to Jean-Max Albert's French poem La camera sans film, in a hand-printed, limited-edition art book by Kate Van Houten (Estepa Editions, Paris 2010) and "Saorganach/En affranchi à faux", a bilingual French/Irish poem illustrated by Valerie Vahey in a hand-printed, limited-edition boxed set, "Poésie et Gravure" (Ateliers Bo Halbirk, 2012). O'Sullivan was commissioned by the PayneShurvell gallery to write an interpretation of Rudolf Reiber's Suspiria (2012) as part of the first solo exhibition in London of the German artist. He also collaborated (in Latin) with the Mexican artist Guillermo Arizta.

O'Sullivan died in Paris in August 2025, at the age of 81.

== Sources ==
- "The Cambridge History of Irish Literature", Volume 2, page 349. published 2006: "A shortlist of the most notable among the (re)emergent voices (in contemporary Irish language poetry) might include... Derry O'Sullivan. O'Sullivan's technical ingenuity and agitated intelligence are such that they constantly threaten to outrun his linguistic ability; his elegy for a stillborn child, 'Marbhghin: Glaoch ar Liombo', is one of the most achingly beautiful Irish poems of the twentieth century."
- Poetry Ireland Review, Number 102: "O'Sullivan's language has tremendous range and one would suspect that if Irish were to become a language of Paris it might be spoken as O'Sullivan writes it."
