= Yuri Ahronovitch =

Israeli conductor

Yuri Mikhaylovich Ahronovitch Юрий Михайлович Аронович
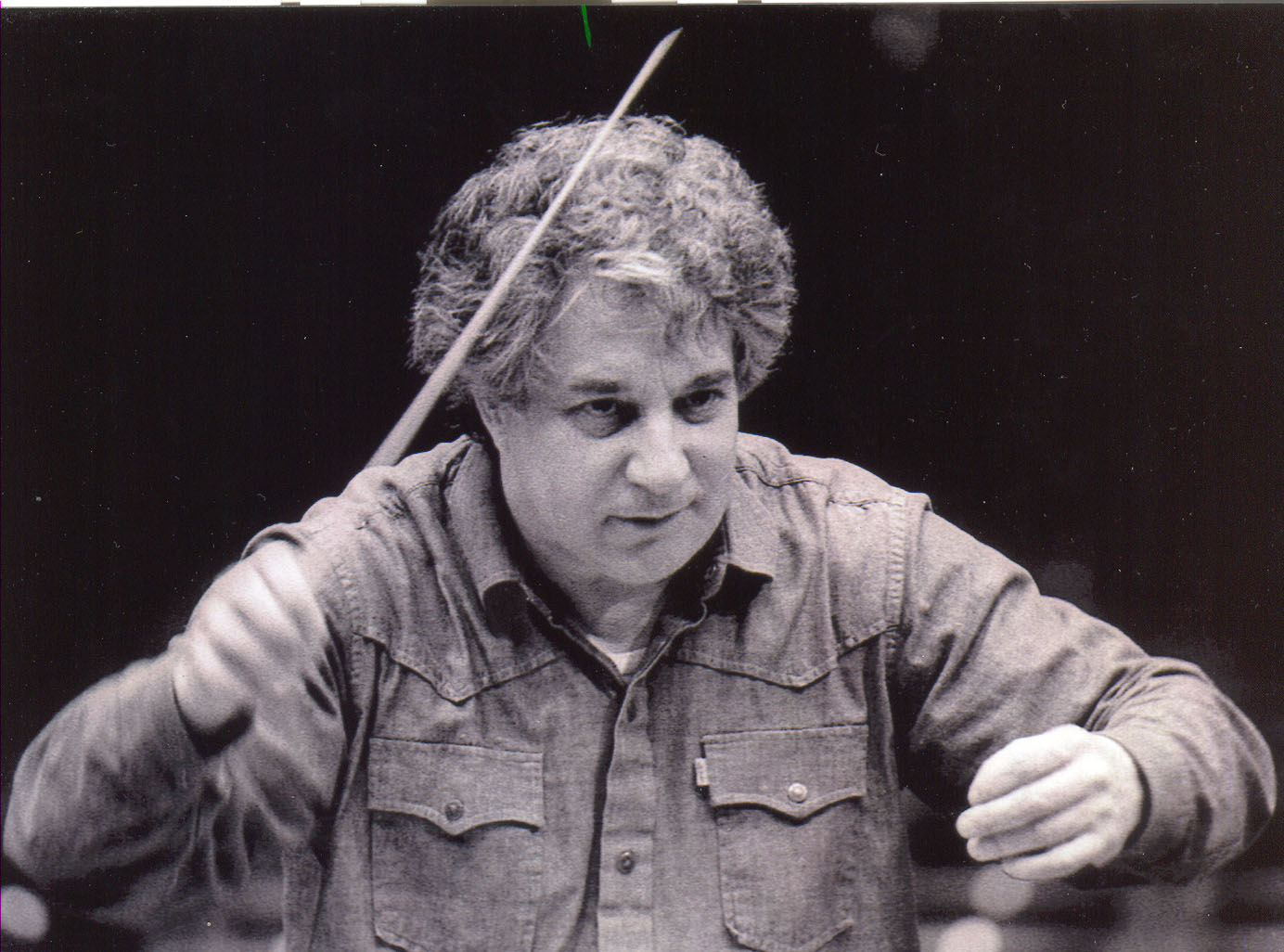
- Yuri Ahronovitch (1986)

Background information
- Born: May 13, 1932 (age 93); Leningrad, Soviet Union
- Died: October 31, 2002 (aged 70)
- Occupation: Conductor
- Years active: 1956–2002

Yuri Mikhaylovich Ahronovitch (Russian: Юрий Михайлович Аронович; 13 May 1932 – 31 October 2002) was a Soviet-born Israeli conductor.

Born in Leningrad, he studied music and the violin from the age of 4. In 1954 he graduated as conductor from the Leningrad Conservatory. He studied with Nathan Rachlin and Kurt Sanderling. Invitations to conduct leading Russian orchestras followed, including the Leningrad Philharmonic and the Bolshoi Theatre.

After conducting in Petrozavodsk and Saratov, he was assigned to the Yaroslavl Symphony Orchestra 1956–1964, performing symphonic cycles by Beethoven and Tchaikovsky alongside Soviet music such as the works of Aram Khachaturian and Tikhon Khrennikov.

In 1964 he was appointed Chief Conductor of the USSR Ministry of Culture Symphony Orchestra and worked there until emigrating to Israel in 1972.

His recordings for Melodiya, notably Shostakovich's First Symphony, were well received in the West.

Immediate invitations followed to conduct and tour with major orchestras: the London Symphony Orchestra, Israel Philharmonic, Vienna Symphony Orchestra, Yomiuri Nippon Symphony Orchestra, Teatro Alla Scala and others.

From 1975 to 1986 he was Chief Conductor of the Cologne Philharmonic Orchestra (Gürzenich Orchestra Cologne) and from 1982 to 1987 Chief Conductor of the Stockholm Philharmonic Orchestra. Simultaneously Yuri Ahronovitch was also an opera conductor. He conducted at the Royal Opera House in London's Covent Garden, the Lyric Opera in Chicago, important Italian opera houses and Symphony Orchestra (Orchestra Sinfonica Siciliana), the Royal Opera in Stockholm, Cologne Opera, the Bavarian State Opera in Munich. He made a number of premiere recordings, mainly with the London Symphony, the Stockholm Philharmonic and the Vienna Symphony Orchestra.

Yuri Ahronovitch was a member of the Royal Swedish Academy of Music from 1984, and in 1987 he was decorated by the King of Sweden as "Commander of the Royal Order of the Polar Star".

In 1988 in Jerusalem he was awarded the "Ettinger Prize for the Arts". In Italy Yuri Ahronovitch was awarded the prize "Arca d'Oro 1991" by the leading Italian newspaper La Stampa and the University of Turin. Yuri Ahronovitch conducted at numerous international music festivals, such as Bergen, Bregenz, Canary Islands, Florida, Israel, Locarno, Luzern, Munich, Savonnlina, Spoleto, Stresa, and Verona. He conducted his last concert with the Orchestre de Paris in October 2002.

== Discography ==
Full Yuri Aronovitch discography:

- Bruckner - Symphony No. 7, Gürzenich-Orchester Köln
- De Frumerie - Singoalla, Stockholms Philharmonic Orchestra
- Dvorak - Symphony no. 6, Stuttgart Radio Symphony Orchestra
- Franck - Symphony D minor, Vienna Symphony Orchestra
- Glazunov - Symphony Nr. 5, Symphonieorchester des Bayerischen Rundfunks
- Listz - Les Preludes, Vienna Symphony Orchestra
- Listz - Symphony to Dante's Divina Commedia, Frankfurt Radio Symphony
- Mussorgsky - Night on The Bare Mountain, London Symphony Orchestra
- Rachmaninov - The Piano Concertos & Paganini Rhapsody
- Sibelius - Symphony No. 2, Gürzenich-Orchester Köln
- Shostakovich - Katarina Ismalova, Orchestra Sinfonica della RAI di Milano
- Shostakovich - Symphony No.1,
- Shostakovich - Symphony No. 5., Stockholm Philharmonic Orchestra
- Shostakovich - Symphony No. 7, "Leningrad", Stuttgart Radio Symphony Orchestra
- Shostakovich - Sinfonia No 14, Orchestra Sinfonica della RAI di Milano
- Khachaturian - Orchestra dell'Accademia di Santa Cecilia
- Tchaikovsky - 1812 Overture, Marche Slav, Romeo & Julie
- Tchaikovsky - Suite nr. 3, Symphonieorchester des Bayerischen Rundfunks
- Tchaikovsky - Swan Lake suite op. 20, SWR Sinfonieorchester Baden-Baden und Freiburg
- Tchaikovsky - Manfred, London Symphony Orchestra
- Weinberg - Symphony No. 6, Jerusalem Symphony Orchestra

Cultural offices
Preceded by Samuil Samosud	Principal Conductor, USSR Ministry of Culture Symphony Orchestra; 1964–1971	Succeeded by Maxim Shostakovich
Preceded by Günter Wand	Kapellmeister, Gürzenich Orchestra Cologne; 1975–1986	Succeeded by Marek Janowski
Preceded by Gennady Rozhdestvensky	Principal Conductor, Royal Stockholm Philharmonic Orchestra; 1982–1987	Succeeded by Paavo Berglund
