= Violin Concerto No. 4 (Schnittke) =

1984 concerto by Alfred Schnittke

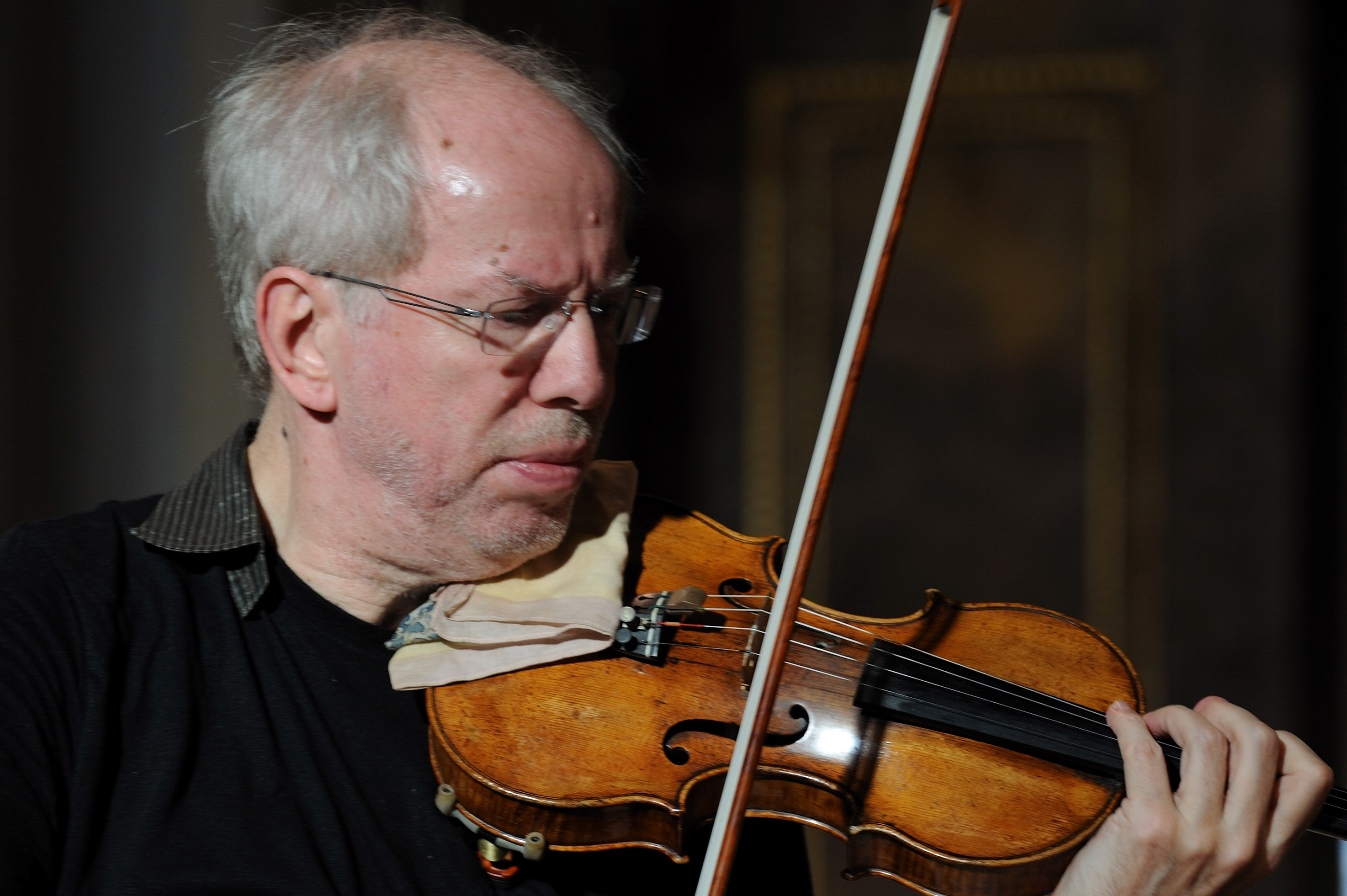
Dedicatee of Schnittke's fourth Violin Concerto, Gidon Kremer

The Concerto no. 4 for Violin and Orchestra is a violin concerto by Soviet and German composer Alfred Schnittke. It was commissioned by the 34th Berlin Festival and written in 1984. Its first performance was given in Berlin on 11 September 1984 with dedicatee Gidon Kremer as soloist and the Berlin Philharmonic Orchestra conducted by Christoph von Dohnányi.

== Structure and style ==
The concerto is scored for solo violin and an orchestra consisting of 3 flutes (3rd doubling alto flute), 2 oboes, cor anglais, 3 clarinets in B♭ (3rd doubling bass clarinet in B♭), alto saxophone in E♭, 3 bassoons (3rd doubling contrabassoon), 4 horns in F, 4 trumpets in B♭, 4 trombones, contrabass tuba, percussion (6 players), harp, celesta, harpsichord, prepared piano, and strings.

The movements are as follows:

1. Andante
2. Vivo
3. Adagio
4. Lento

A performance typically lasts approximately 35 minutes.

The concerto focuses its musical material on a monogram derived from the name of its dedicatee.

Thus, in the opening movement, the first four notes (bars 1 and 2) on bells and prepared piano spell out, in Anglo-Saxon and Tonic sol-fa music letter notation the note names G – C (Do in Tonic sol-fa) – D (Re in Tonic sol-fa) – E, corresponding to G i Do n K Re m E r. The next four notes (bars 4 and 5), on the same instruments, spell out Gidon Kremer in a different way, using Anglo-Saxon letter notation only, thus G - D - E - E (an octave lower) for G i D on Kr E m E r. These eight notes provide the principle theme ("Kremer theme") for the first movement and re-appear elsewhere in the concerto, particularly the final movement. Schnittke uses a similar technique to include a musical monogram of his own name: A – F – E – D – S – C – H – E (in German notation S corresponds to E♭ and H corresponds to B♮) in the music of this movement.

The first movement is largely based on alternations between the Kremer theme and another warmer theme, introduced immediately after the Kremer theme's first appearance by woodwinds and horn, played initially in A♭ major before shifting towards a darker C♯ minor.

The second movement, marked Vivo (lively), contrasts strongly with the first. It begins with the solo violin playing a moto perpetuo theme and then taking up a more lyrical melody. The soloist's role gradually thins out until Schnittke instructs them to perform a cadenza visuale, a "visual cadenza" in which they mime playing a cadenza but without actually producing any sound.

The third movement begins in almost Baroque territory with the solo violin being accompanied by a chamber music group including harpsichord. This is soon and repeatedly interrupted by strident repetitions of themes from movements one and two.

The finale consists of recollections of music from the previous three movements, as if summarising and commenting on what has preceded. Schnittke also weaves in musical monograms of fellow composers Edison Denisov, Sofia Gubaidulina and Arvo Pärt. At the climax of the movement there is a second cadenza visuale before the concerto closes quietly with a repetition of the Kremer theme.

== Discography ==
- BIS - Oleh Krysa, Malmö Symphony Orchestra, Eri Klas (conductor)
- Melodiya - Gidon Kremer, Moscow Conservatory Symphony Orchestra, Gennady Rozhdestvensky (cond.)
- Teldec - Gidon Kremer, Philharmonia Orchestra, Christoph Eschenbach (cond.)
