= Concerto for Piano and String Orchestra =

1979 composition by Alfred Schnittke

- by Alfred Schnittke
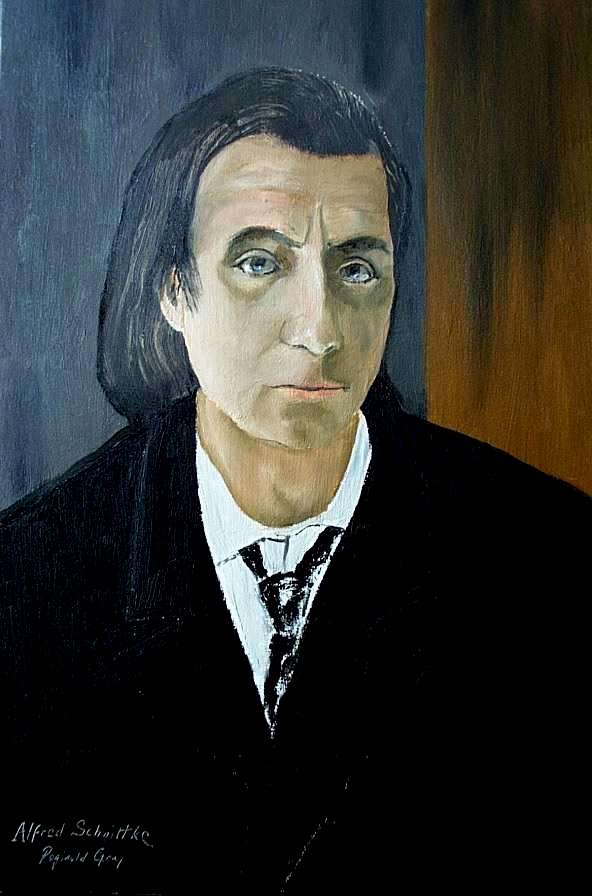
- Portrait of Alfred Schnittke by Reginald Gray (1972)
- Dedication: Vladimir Krainev
- Duration: 28 minutes

Premiere
- Date: 19 December 1979
- Location: Great Hall of the Leningrad Philharmonia; Leningrad, Russian SFSR
- Conductor: Alexander Dmitriev
- Performers: Vladimir Krainev; Leningrad Philharmonic

The Concerto for Piano and String Orchestra is a piano concerto composed by Alfred Schnittke in 1979, and premiered in Leningrad that year. The unconventional work is in a single movement with contrasting sections. It is one of Schnittke's most often performed works. It is also known as Schnittke's Piano Concerto. (Note: Schnittke composed three concertos for piano and instruments, the Concerto for Piano and String Orchestra being the second in chronology.)

== History ==
In 1979, the year of the Concerto's creation, Schnittke developed interests in yoga, Kabbalah, the I Ching, and anthroposophy. According to Alexander Demchenko, Schnittke also continued his use of Christian motifs throughout his works from the 1970s, including the Concerto for Piano and String Orchestra. Initially, he contemplated subtitling it "Variations Not On a Theme."

Schnittke described the concerto in conversation with Alexander Ivashkin:

I found the desired somnambulistic security in the approach to triteness in form and dynamics—and in the immediate avoidance of the same, [...] where everything—unable to create the balance between "sunshine" and "storm clouds"—shatters finally into a thousand pieces. The Coda consists of dream-like soft recollections of all that came before. Only at the end does a new uncertainty arise—maybe not without hope?

Elsewhere, he explained that his twin intentions in the Concerto were to "avoid" and "approach banality in form and dynamics." In the context of this work, banality did not imply connections to pop music, but to "a certain flow of monotonous rhythms [...], passive succession of repeated chords," and an overall feeling of "excess," particularly in dramatically vital moments. Schnittke also described various points of the Concerto as sounding like "shadowy webs of polyphonic canons," "false burst of Prokofievian energy," "surrealistic shreds of sunrise from Orthodox church music," and a "blues nightmare".

Schnittke composed the concerto for the pianist Vladimir Krainev, who was also its dedicatee. Krainev premiered the work in Leningrad on 10 December 1979 in a concert by the Philharmonic Society, with members of the Leningrad Philharmonic conducted by Alexander Dmitriev.

It was published in 1982 by Sovietsky kompozitor and 2009 by Sikorski. Each edition is based on different manuscript scores, resulting in minor differences. Both texts are considered canonical and are up to the performer to choose.

== Music ==
While Schnittke's earlier piano concerto from 1960 and a later one for piano four-hands from 1988 adhere to the traditional concerto structure in different contrasting movements, the composer wrote this concerto as a continuous single movement, with sections marked Moderato · Andante · Maestoso · Allegro · Tempo di valse · Moderato · Maestoso · Moderato · Tempo primo. The duration is given as 23 minutes.

A solitary piano begins in a pensive mood, followed by note clusters, "grinding" unison passages and jazzy elements, among others, often coming as a surprise. The end offers soft lyrical piano playing and "ghostly murmurings" from the strings. The climax quotes a Russian Orthodox chant.

According to Peter J. Schmelz, the work's use of blues music parallels similar usage in Bernd Alois Zimmermann's Concerto for Cello and Orchestra en forme de pas de trois.

A typical performance takes approximately 28 minutes.

== Recordings ==
In a 1997 recording, the Concerto appears with a violin concerto and a violin sonata by Schnittke, played by Ralf Gothóni and the Virtuosi di Kuhmo. The Concerto was recorded, combined with Shostakovich's First Piano Concerto, played by Yakov Kasman and the Chamber Orchestra of the Kaliningrad Philharmonic, conducted by Emmanuel Leducq-Barome. A reviewer noted: "Even in its most lyrical, expansive moments, there’s nothing pretty about Schnittke’s Concerto for Piano and String Orchestra, with its seasick microtonal lurches, pounding non-minimalist repetitions, and tortured baroque allusions". A collection of three piano concertos by Schnittke was released in 2006, played by Ewa Kupiec and the Rundfunk-Sinfonieorchester Berlin conducted by Frank Strobel. A reviewer summarised that the music "overturns conventions and expectations with astonishing facility". A 2008 recording combined the Concerto with piano music, played by Victoria Lyubitskaya with the Russian State Academy Symphonic Orchestra conducted by Mark Gorenstein.

== Sources ==
- Ivashkin, Alexander, ed. (2002). An Alfred Schnittke Reader. Bloomington, Indiana: Indiana University Press. ISBN 0-253-33818-2.
- Ivashkin, Alexander (2014). "Каталог сочинений". Беседы с Альфредом Шнитке (in Russian). Moscow: Классика-ХХI. ISBN 978-5-89817-385-2.
- Demchenko, Alexander (2015). "Три взгляда из XXI столетия". Приношение Альфреду Гарриевичу Шнитке: Сборник статей по материалам Всероссийских научных чтений, посвященных 80-летию со дня рождения композитора (in Russian). Saratov: Саратовская государственная консерватория имени Л.В. Собинова. ISBN 978-5-94841-198-9.
- Kislitsyna, Anna (May 2018). "Alfred Schnittke's Concerto for Piano and Strings within the Context of his Piano Works" (PDF) (dissertation). Temple University. Archived from the original (PDF) on 28 October 2022.
- Schmelz, Peter J. (2020). Sonic Overload: Alfred Schnittke, Valentin Silvestrov, and Polystylism in the Late USSR. Oxford University Press. ISBN 978-0-19-754125-8.
