= Concerto for Mixed Choir =

1985 concerto by Alfred Schnittke

The Concerto for Mixed Choir (Russian: Концерт для смешанного хора) is a choral work by Soviet composer Alfred Schnittke. Composed in 1985 and premiered on 9 June 1986, at a time where the composer tried to find his own religious identity (he converted to Catholicism in 1982, although he converted to the Orthodox Church shortly before his death in 1998).

== Structure ==
The piece is scored for very large a cappella SATB chorus with each voice singing multiple divisi, 16 in total. Approximately 40 minutes long, and demanding vocal virtuosity, the work is in 4 movements, set to a translation by Naum Isaevich Grebnev (1921–1988) of the third chapter from the Book of Lamentations by Armenian poet Gregory of Narek (951–1003), whose work intrigued Schnittke during his time of composing the work.

The movements are as follows:

1. O, povelitel' sushchego vsego, bestsennymi darami nas daryashchiy (O, Lord of all that exists, who bestows upon us priceless gifts) (Russian: О, повелитель сущего всего, бесценными дарами нас дарящий)
2. Sobran'ye pesen sikh, gde kazhdyy stikh napolnen skorb'yu (Collected songs where every verse is full of grief / "I, the expert on human souls") (Russian: Собранье песен сих, где каждый стих наполнен скорбью)
3. Vsem tem, kto vniknet v sushchnost' skorbnykh slov (To all those who will delve into the essence of these sorrowful words / "God grant deliverance from sin") (Russian: Всем тем, кто вникнет в сущность скорбных слов)
4. Sey trud, chto nachinal ya s upovan'yem i s imenem Tvoim (This work that I began with hope and with Your name) (Russian: Сей труд, что начинал я с упованьем и с именем Твоим)
