= Viktoria Postnikova =

Russian musician

Viktoria Valentinovna Postnikova (Russian: Виктория Валентиновна Постникова; born 12 January 1944) is a Russian pianist.

== Biography ==
Postnikova was born in Moscow into a family of musicians. She entered the Central Music School of the Moscow Conservatory at age six, studying with E.B. Musaelian. She graduated in 1967, having studied there and in postgraduate courses with Professor Yakov Flier. In 1965, she received an honorable mention at the VII International Chopin Piano Competition. She subsequently also won prizes at the Leeds International Piano Competition in England, the Vianna da Motta International Music Competition in Lisbon, and the Fourth International Tchaikovsky Competition in Moscow.

Her repertoire is extremely broad. She took part in concerts, recordings and recitals at home and abroad with her conductor husband Gennady Rozhdestvensky, whom she married in 1969. He died in June 2018. Their son, Sasha Rozhdestvensky, is a violinist.

== Recordings ==
Postnikova has recorded all three Tchaikovsky concertos for Decca; the Busoni Piano Concerto along with the complete piano music of Tchaikovsky, Janáček, and Glinka for Erato; violin sonatas by Richard Strauss and Busoni for Chandos; and the complete piano concertos of Brahms, Chopin, and Prokofiev among many other recordings for Melodiya.
