= Symphony No. 9 (Schnittke) =

1996 unfinished symphony by Alfred Schnittke

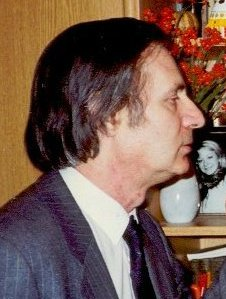
Alfred Schnittke in 1989

The Symphony No. 9 by Alfred Schnittke was written two years before his death in 1998. As a result of paralysis following a series of strokes, the manuscript was barely readable, and a performing edition was made by Gennady Rozhdestvensky.

Schnittke was dissatisfied with Rozhdestvensky's edition, and following his death his widow Irina Schnittke sought to have a reconstruction made that was more faithful to the manuscript. Nikolai Korndorf was first engaged to perform the task, and following his early death, the manuscript was passed to Alexander Raskatov. Raskatov not only reconstructed Schnittke's Ninth but also wrote his own composition: Nunc dimittis – In memoriam Alfred Schnittke, which was performed after the symphony in the premiere recording conducted by Dennis Russell Davies.

== Music ==
Schnittke employs a large orchestra, including triple woodwinds, four horns, three trumpets, three trombones, tuba, strings, three percussionists and harpsichord.

The symphony is in three movements, each faster than the one before it:

1. [Andante]
2. Moderato
3. Presto

The opening movement originally had no tempo marking: Raskatov added one following Irina Schnittke's suggestion that the composer's idea was to escalate from a slow movement at the beginning to a faster one in the middle and a very fast movement at the end.

== Commentary ==
The Andante begins with the strings followed by the clarinet and the trombone. Raskatov called that section: “voice from beyond”. Consecutive events are interrupted by violent brass. The clarinet plays the leading role, gradually dominating the woodwind section.

The Moderato central movement begins with the strings followed by the wind instruments and harpsichord. The horn plays a delusive solo and the drum beats out a rhythm announcing a fast finale. That movement is a transformation from the first movement's lamentation into the third movement's impetus.

The Presto begins with the strings playing against the beat and the wind instruments building the wall of the sound. The strings and the piccolo carry on the dialogue. The harpsichord comes back for a while. A short wind chorale increases and collapses and dissonant pianissimo chords close the work.

== Critical reactions ==
Schnittke's Symphony No. 9 in the version prepared by Raskatov as well as its world premiere recording conducted by Davies have given rise to diverse and conflicting opinions.

James Leonard from allmusic.com writes: "Schnittke’s Ninth may or may not be judged the equal or even the superior of his Eighth, but it is vastly better than Raskatov’s own Nunc dimittis that accompanies it here". He adds, "But after hearing it [[Nunc dimittis]], the listener can be certain that its composer added nothing of his own music to the score of Schnittke's Ninth".

Robert Carl from ArkivMusic.com writes: "I can’t help [in my interpretation of Symphony No. 9] but feel making a piece out of the most basic, even banal, material may be something of a didactic point, or a dark joke in the spirit of Soviet era humor (even though the piece postdates the fall of that empire)". On Nunc dimittis, he said, "No matter what my reservations about the Schnittke, however, the Raskatov is a revelation".

== Discography ==
- Alfred Schnittke, Symphony No. 9; Alexander Raskatov, Nunc Dimittis, Dresdner Philharmonie, The Hilliard Ensemble, Elena Vassilieva (mez.), Dennis Russell Davies (cond.), ECM, 2009, ECM New Series 2025, 476 6994.
- Alfred Schnittke, Concerto grosso No. 1; Symphony No. 9, Cape Philharmonic Orchestra, Owain Arwel Hughes, BIS, 2009, CD-1727.
- Alfred Schnittke, The Ten Symphonies: Symphony No. 0, Cape Philharmonic Orchestra, Owain Arwel Hughes; Symphony No. 1, Royal Stockholm Philharmonic Orchestra, Leif Segerstam; Symphony No. 2 "St. Florian", Mikaeli Chamber Choir, Royal Stockholm Philharmonic Orchestra, Leif Segerstam; Symphony No. 3, Royal Stockholm Philharmonic Orchestra, Eri Klas; Symphony No. 4, Stockholm Sinfonietta, Uppsala Academic Chamber Choir, Okko Kamu; Symphony No. 5 – Concerto grosso No. 4, Gothenburg Symphony Orchestra, Neeme Järvi; Symphony No. 6, BBC National Orchestra of Wales, Tadaaki Otaka; Symphony No. 7, BBC National Orchestra of Wales, Tadaaki Otaka; Symphony No. 8, Norrköping Symphony Orchestra, Lü Jia; Symphony No. 9, Cape Philharmonic Orchestra, Owain Arwel Hughes, BIS, 2009, CD-1767-68.

== Bibliography ==
- The conversation of Helmut Peters with Alexander Raskatov, in:, liner note for Symphony No. 9; Nunc dimittis, ECM, 2009 (see: discography).
- Helmut Peters, The Story of an Autograph, in:, liner note for Symphony No. 9; Nunc dimittis, ECM, 2009 (see: discography).
