= Symphony No. 5 (Schnittke) =

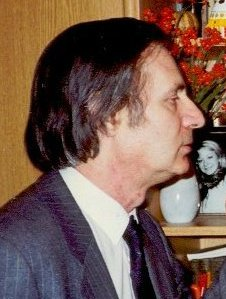
Alfred Schnittke in 1989

The Symphony No. 5 by the Russian composer Alfred Schnittke, which is also his Concerto Grosso No. 4, was composed in 1988. Schnittke wrote the piece to a commission by the Royal Concertgebouw Orchestra for its centenary in 1988, when it was premiered under Riccardo Chailly, the same forces recording it soon after. The work itself lasts for around 37 minutes.

== Music ==
Written for a very large orchestra, as the dual nature of the work's titles suggest, the composition represents a synthesis of ideas from Schnittke's earlier works. There are four movements:

1. Allegro
2. Allegretto
3. Lento - Allegro
4. Lento

The first movement of the symphony is the Concerto Grosso, with solos for violin, oboe and harpsichord. However unlike the traditional form of the concerto grosso, the sheer weight of the orchestral forces remains ever present, reminding the listener of the overarching (romantic) symphonic structure.

The second movement is an elaboration of a piece of juvenilia by Gustav Mahler: an unfinished piano quartet, which the teenage Mahler started in 1876. However unlike a traditional 'theme and variations' approach, Schnittke begins with his own worked-out realisation of Mahler's idea, and unwinds it so that the movement concludes with the original material.

The third movement is violent and climactic, which having reached a thunderous apex then moves purposefully into an allegro which, although it has a powerful sense of forward movement, breaks off suddenly and inconclusively.

The fourth movement is a Mahlerian funeral march which does not dispel the unsettling atmosphere of what has gone before.
