= Mark Lubotsky =

Russian violinist (1931–2021)

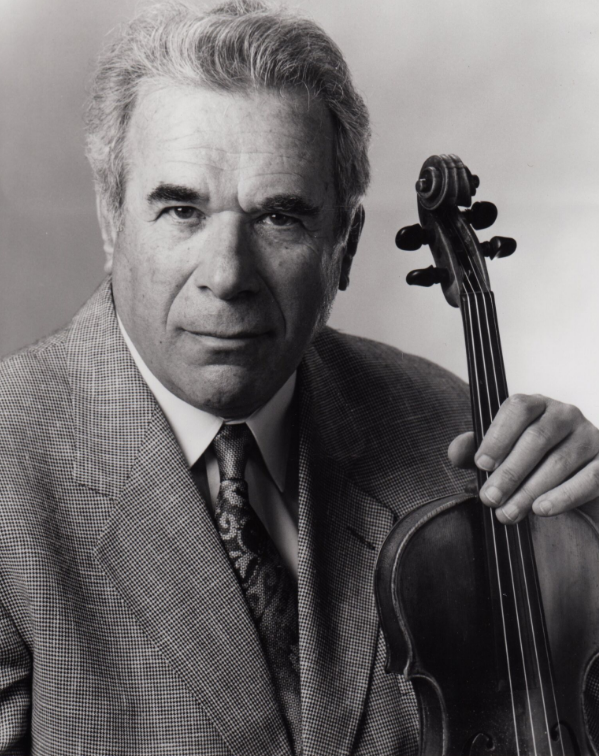
Mark Lubotsky

Mark Davidovich Lubotsky (Russian: Марк Давыдович Лубоцкий; 18 May 1931 – 13 March 2021) was a Russian violinist and music teacher.

== Biography ==
Born in Leningrad, the son of surgeon David Naumovich Lubotsky (1899–1967), Lubotsky began violin studies at age 7, in 1938, at the Moscow Central Music School. He continued his music studies at the Moscow Conservatory, where his teachers included Abram Yampolsky and David Oistrakh. In 1951, Lubotsky was a prize winner at the World Festival of Youth and Students in Berlin. He later became a teacher at the Gnesin Institute in Moscow.

Lubotsky emigrated to the Netherlands in 1976, where he taught at the Sweelinck Conservatorium in Amsterdam and the Rotterdam Conservatory. He later settled in Germany, where he taught at the Hochschule für Musik und Theater Hamburg. Lubotsky was a champion of the music of Alfred Schnittke, who dedicated several of his works to Lubotsky.

He had two sons, Alexander Markovich Lubotsky and David Markovich Lubotsky. Lubotsky died in Hamburg.
