= Polystylism =

Artistic technique

Polystylism is the use of multiple styles or techniques in literature, art, film, or, especially, music.

Some prominent contemporary polystylist composers include Peter Maxwell Davies, Alfred Schnittke, and John Zorn. Polystylist composers from earlier in the twentieth century include Charles Ives and Erik Satie. Among literary figures, James Joyce has been referred to as a polystylist. On the other hand, composers including Sofia Gubaidulina have rejected the term as not applicable to their work.

Though perhaps not the original source of the term, the first important discussion of the subject is Alfred Schnittke's essay "Polystylistic Tendencies in Modern Music (1971)". The composers cited by Schnittke as those who make use of polystylism are Alban Berg, Luciano Berio, Pierre Boulez, Edison Denisov, Hans Werner Henze, Mauricio Kagel, Jan Klusák, György Ligeti, Carl Orff, Arvo Pärt, Krzysztof Penderecki, Henri Pousseur, Rodion Shchedrin, Dmitri Shostakovich, Sergei Slonimsky, Karlheinz Stockhausen, Igor Stravinsky, Boris Tishchenko, Anton Webern, and Bernd Alois Zimmermann.

== See also ==
- 21st-century classical music
- Bricolage
- Collage
- Eclecticism
- Eclecticism in music
- Gesamtkunstwerk
- Postmodern music
