= Historia von D. Johann Fausten (opera) =

1995 opera by Alfred Schnittke

- Opera by Alfred Schnittke
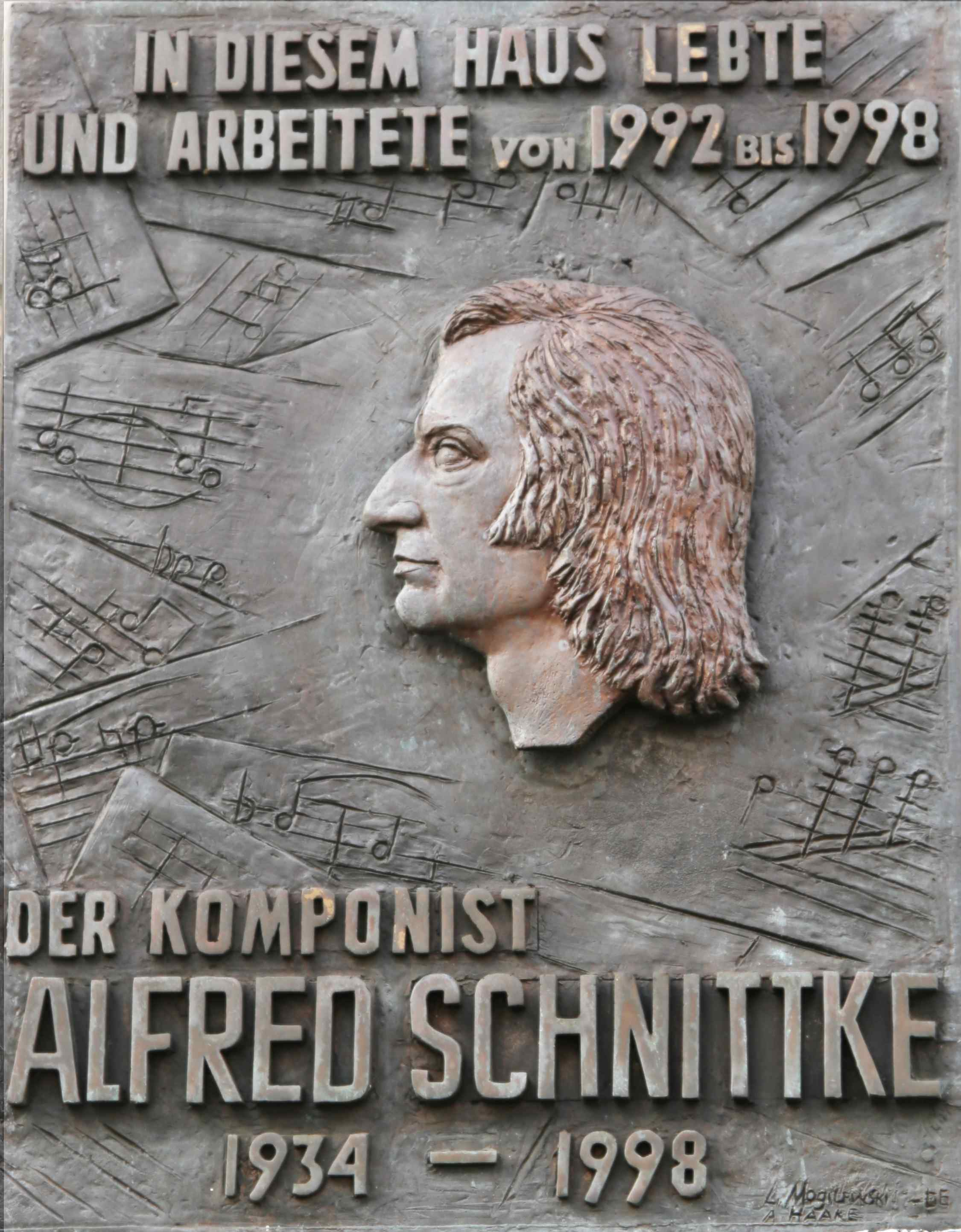
- Plaque in Hamburg where Schnittke lived from 1992 until 1998
- Librettist: Jörg Morgener; Schnittke
- Language: German
- Based on: Historia von D. Johann Fausten
- Premiere: 22 June 1995; Hamburg State Opera

Historia von D. Johann Fausten is an opera by the Russian composer Alfred Schnittke (1934–1998) in three acts, with introduction and epilogue to the German libretto by Jörg Morgener (Jürgen Köchel) and Alfred Schnittke after the anonymous prose book of the same name (published by Johannes Spies in 1587).

== History of creation ==
Schnittke worked on this opera for twelve years (1983–1994). The work was twice interrupted by his work on another opera Life with an Idiot (1990) and by his second stroke in 1991. His Faust Cantata (1983), famous for its tango sung through the microphone by the Devil with the mocking comments on the cruel death of Faust, became the third act of the opera. When premiered in 1995, the opera was performed in an abridged version; it has never been performed or recorded complete.

== Premiere ==
The opera premiered at the Hamburg State Opera on 22 June 1995. The production was directed by John Dew and conducted by Gerd Albrecht. The score was published by Hans Sikorski.

== Roles ==
- Doctor Johann Faustus (bass)
- Narrator (tenor)
- Mephistopheles (countertenor)
- Mephistophila / Helen of Troy (contralto)
- The Old Man (tenor)
- Three Students (three baritones)

also mixed chorus; silent roles; ballet; orchestra 3.3.3.3/4.4.4.1/, 5 percussion players, organ, 2 synthesisers, electric guitar, bass guitar, and also old instruments such as Zwerchpfeif (long military flute), crumhorn, lute and zither.

== Synopsis ==
Time and Place: Early 16th century, Germany

Act 1. The chorus and narrator introduce the audience to Dr. Johann Faustus, ‘the widely famed magician and necromancer’. The scene shows his first meeting with the devil, Mephistopheles. Faustus agrees to sign with his blood the contract to gain knowledge and power and to give in return his soul to the devil after some years.

Act 2. Faust asks the devil to find him a wife, but Mephistopheles offers him ‘a woman for the bed’ instead. Faust asks the devil to show him Hell and Paradise. During this journey Faust is mocked by two devils, Mephistopheles and Mephistophila. He is already ready to accept the help of an old Christian man. However Mephistopheles threatens to kill him and forces Faustus to sign a new contract, now with ‘the mighty God, Lucifer’. Only a beautiful vision of Helen of Troy calms his grief.

Act 3. Twenty four years later Faustus expects that the devil will take his soul. He informs his students, and they ask him to repent to be saved. The prayers of Faustus are in vain. Mephistopheles appears and singing the mocking couplets, fiercely destroys him into pieces. The students attend his room on the next morning and watch his remains. The chorus tells the audience to learn the moral of this story, to be sober and resist evil.

== Recordings ==
- (CD) RCA Red Seal 09026684132. Jürgen Freier, Eberhard Lorenz, Arno Raunig, Hanna Schwarz, Eberhard Büchner, Jonathan Barreto-Ramos, Christoph Johannes Wendel, Jürgen Fersch, Hamburg State Opera Chorus, Hamburg State Opera Orchestra, Gerd Albrecht
