= Valery Polyansky =

Russian conductor (born 1949)

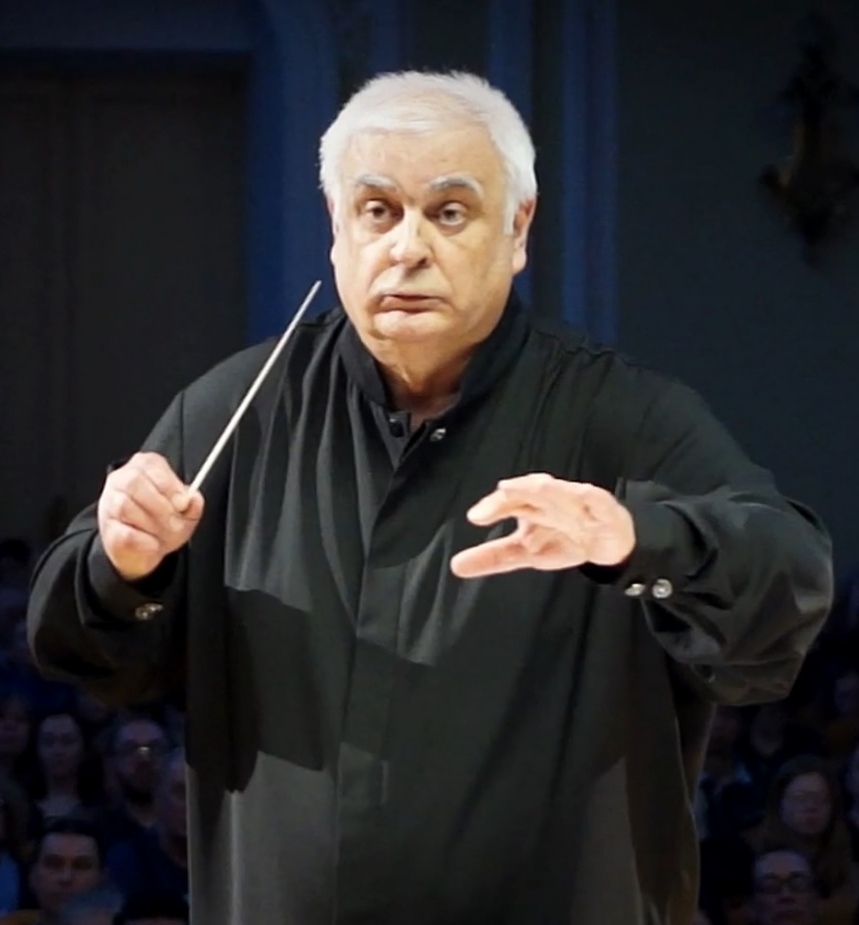
Valery Polyansky in May 2019

Valery Kuzmich Polyansky (Russian: Валерий Кузьмич Полянский; born April 19, 1949, in Moscow) is a Russian orchestral and choral conductor. He is a professor of the Moscow Conservatory, People's Artist of Russia (1996), artistic director, chief conductor and founder of the State Symphony Capella of Russia.

== Biography ==
Polyansky was born at April 19, 1949 in Moscow.

He studied at the Academic Music College at the Tchaikovsky Moscow State Conservatory, graduating in 1967. Then he studied at the Moscow Conservatory.

== Awards and honours ==
- Honored Artist of the RSFSR (1989)
- State Prize of the Russian Federation in the field of literature and the arts in 1995
- People's Artist of Russia (1996)
- Order of Honour (1999)
- Order "For Merit to the Fatherland", III and IV degrees (2019, 2007)
- Order of Saint Sergius of Radonezh

| Preceded by Gennady Rozhdestvensky | Principal Conductors, State Symphony Capella of Russia; 1992–present | Incumbent |
