= State Symphony Capella of Russia =

The State Symphony Capella of Russia (Государственная академическая симфоническая капелла России) comprises an orchestra and a choir, both based in Moscow, Russia. Its principal conductor is Valery Polyansky. It was formed in 1991 by merging the former USSR Ministry of Culture Symphony Orchestra (Симфонический оркестр Министерства культуры СССР) with the USSR State Chamber Choir (Государственный камерный хор СССР).

(It is not to be confused with the Russian State Symphony Orchestra, formerly the USSR State Symphony Orchestra.)

== Principal Conductors ==
- Valeri Polyansky (1992–present)
- Gennady Rozhdestvensky (1981–1992)
- Maxim Shostakovich (1971–1981)
- Yuri Ahronovich (1964–1971)
- Samuil Samosud (1957–1964)
