= Alfred Schnittke =

Soviet and Russian composer (1934–1998)

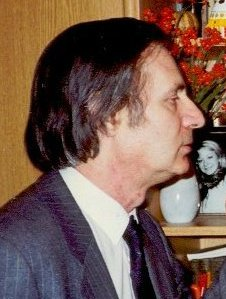
- Schnittke in 1989
- Born: Alfred Garrievich Schnittke; 24 November 1934; Engels, Russian SFSR, Soviet Union
- Died: 3 August 1998 (aged 63); Hamburg, Germany
- Citizenship: Soviet Union; Russia; Germany
- Works: List of compositions
- Awards: Praemium Imperiale (1992)

Alfred Garrievich Schnittke (Note: Russian: Альфред Гарриевич Шнитке, romanized: Alfred Garriyevich Shnitke.) (24 November 1934 – 3 August 1998) was a Soviet-era Russian composer. (Note: Schnittke is referred variously as a "Russian composer", a "composer of Jewish-German ancestry born in Russia", and "of part German descent, the Russian composer". On the complications of his nationality and ancestry, the musicologist Alexander Ivashkin reflected that he was "a Russian composer with a typically German name, born in Russia without a drop of Russian blood, in the town of Engels – once the capital of a German republic in the Soviet Union – of a Jewish (but German-speaking) father and German mother; a composer who has no home country, who is a foreigner everywhere".) Among the most performed and recorded composers of late 20th-century classical music, he is described by musicologist Ivan Moody as a "composer who was concerned in his music to depict the moral and spiritual struggles of contemporary man in [...] depth and detail."

Schnittke's early music shows the strong influence of Dmitri Shostakovich. He developed a polystylistic technique in works such as the epic Symphony No. 1 (1969–1972) and his first concerto grosso (1977). In the 1980s, Schnittke's music began to become more widely known abroad with the publication of his second (1980) and third (1983) string quartets and the String Trio (1985); the ballet Peer Gynt (1985–1987); the third (1981), fourth (1984), and fifth (1988) symphonies; and the viola concerto (1985) and first cello concerto (1985–1986). As his health deteriorated, Schnittke's music started to abandon much of the extroversion of his polystylism and retreated into a more withdrawn, bleak style.

== Biography ==
=== Early life ===
Schnittke's father, Harry Schnittke (1914–1975), was Jewish and born in Frankfurt. He moved to the Soviet Union in 1927 and worked as a journalist and translator from the Russian language into German. His mother, Maria Iosifovna Schnittke (née Vogel, 1910–1972), was a Volga German born in Russia. Schnittke's paternal grandmother, Tea Abramovna Katz (1889–1970), was a philologist, translator, and editor of German-language literature.

Alfred Schnittke was born in Engels in the Volga German ASSR of the Russian SFSR. He began his musical education in 1946 in Vienna, where his father had been posted. It was in Vienna, Schnittke's biographer Alexander Ivashkin writes, where "he fell in love with music which is part of life, part of history and culture, part of the past which is still alive." "I felt every moment there," the composer wrote, "to be a link of the historical chain: all was multi-dimensional; the past represented a world of ever-present ghosts, and I was not a barbarian without any connections, but the conscious bearer of the task in my life." Schnittke's experience in Vienna "gave him a certain spiritual experience and discipline for his future professional activities. It was Mozart and Schubert, not Tchaikovsky and Rachmaninoff, whom he kept in mind as a reference point in terms of taste, manner and style. This reference point was essentially Classical ... but never too blatant." In 1948, the family moved to Moscow.

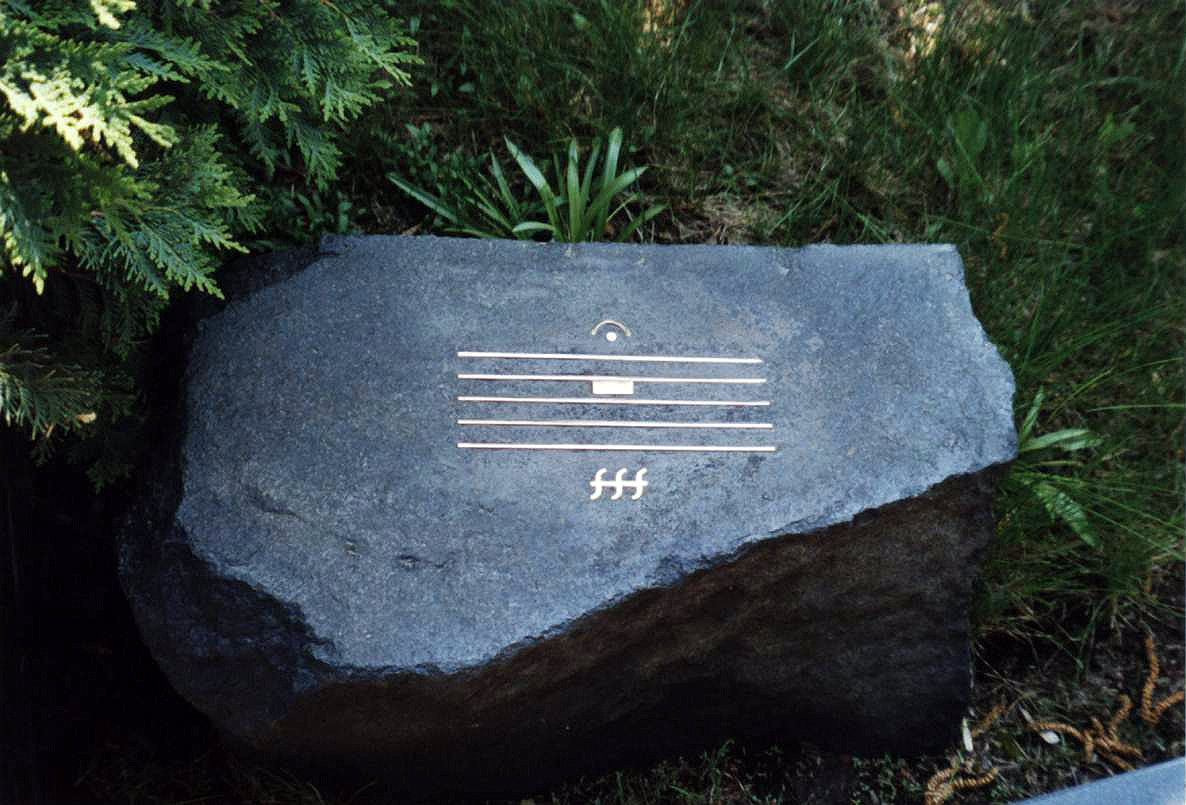
Schnittke's gravestone, showing a fermata over a whole rest marked fff

=== Career ===
In 1961, Schnittke completed his graduate work in composition at the Moscow Conservatory and taught there from 1962 to 1972. Evgeny Golubev was one of his composition teachers. He studied orchestration with Nikolai Rakov. Thereafter, he earned his living chiefly by composing film scores, producing nearly 70 scores in 30 years.

After his mother's death in 1972, he began to compose his Piano Quintet in her memory. During its composition, he began to seek solace in Catholicism; he converted on 18 June 1983. He possessed deeply held beliefs in predestination and mysticism which influenced his music.

Schnittke and his music were often viewed suspiciously by the Soviet bureaucracy. His First Symphony was effectively banned by the Composers' Union. After he abstained from a Composers' Union vote in 1980, he was banned from travelling outside the USSR.

=== Ill health and death ===
On 21 July 1985, Schnittke suffered a stroke, which left him in a coma. He was declared clinically dead on several occasions, but recovered and continued to compose. In 1990, Schnittke left the Soviet Union and settled in Hamburg, Germany. He continued to hold dual German-Russian citizenship. However, his health remained poor. He suffered several more strokes before his death on 3 August 1998, in Hamburg, at the age of 63. He was buried, with state honors, at Novodevichy Cemetery in Moscow.

== Music ==
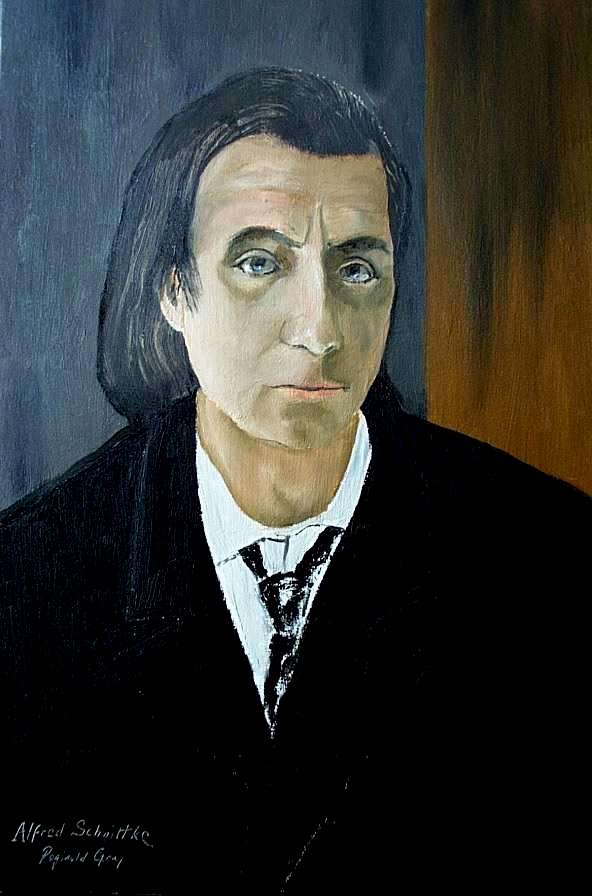
Portrait of Alfred Schnittke by Reginald Gray (1972)

Schnittke's early music shows the strong influence of Dmitri Shostakovich, but after the visit of the Italian composer Luigi Nono to the USSR, he took up the serial technique in works such as Music for Piano and Chamber Orchestra (1964). However, Schnittke soon became dissatisfied with what he termed the "puberty rites of serial self-denial." He created a new style which has been called "polystylism", where he juxtaposed and combined music of various styles past and present. He once wrote, "The goal of my life is to unify serious music and light music, even if I break my neck in doing so." His first concert work to use the polystylistic technique was the second violin sonata, Quasi una sonata (1967–1968). He experimented with techniques in his film work, as shown by much of the sonata appearing first in his score for the 1968 animation short The Glass Harmonica. He wrote the music for Aleksandr Askoldov's Commissar, combining and juxtaposing European, ethnic Russian and Jewish musical patterns. He continued to develop the polystylistic technique in works such as the epic First Symphony (1969–1972) and First Concerto Grosso (1977). Other works were more stylistically unified, such as his Piano Quintet (1972–1976, later orchestrated and retitled as In Memoriam…), written in memory of his mother, who had died in 1972. During the late 1970s, Schnittke developed a darker and more fragmented chamber style, exemplified by the Cello Sonata No. 1 (1978).

In the 1980s, Schnittke's music began to become more widely known abroad, thanks in part to the work of émigré Soviet artists such as the violinists Gidon Kremer and Mark Lubotsky, the cellist and conductor Mstislav Rostropovich, but also by the conductor Gennady Rozhdestvensky. Despite constant illness, he produced a large amount of music, including important works such as the Second (1980) and Third (1983) String Quartets and the String Trio (1985); the Faust Cantata (1983), which he later incorporated in his opera Historia von D. Johann Fausten; the ballet Peer Gynt (1985–1987); the Third (1981), Fourth (1984) and Fifth (1988) Symphonies (the last of which is also known as the Fourth Concerto Grosso), the Concerto for Piano and String Orchestra (1979) and the Viola (1985) and First Cello (1985–1986) Concertos. This period was also marked by a turn in Schnittke and his music to Christian themes, exemplified in his deeply spiritual unaccompanied choral works, the Concerto for Mixed Chorus (1984–1985) and the Penitential Psalms (1988), and alluded to in various other works, including the Fourth Symphony and the Faust Cantata.

As his health deteriorated from the late 1980s, Schnittke started to abandon much of the extroversion of his earlier polystylism and retreated into a more withdrawn, bleak style, quite accessible to the lay listener. The Fourth Quartet (1989) and Sixth (1992), Seventh (1993) and Eighth (1994) symphonies are good examples of this. Some Schnittke scholars, such as Gerard McBurney, have argued that it is the late works that will ultimately be the most influential parts of Schnittke's output. After a stroke in 1994 left him almost completely paralysed, Schnittke largely ceased to compose. He did complete some short works in 1997 and also a Ninth Symphony; its score was almost unreadable because he had written it with great difficulty with his left hand due to his strokes.

The Ninth Symphony was first performed on 19 June 1998 in Moscow in a version deciphered – but also 'arranged' – by Gennady Rozhdestvensky, who conducted the premiere. After hearing a tape of the performance, Schnittke indicated he wanted it withdrawn. After he died, though, others worked to decipher the score. Nikolai Korndorf died before he could complete the task, which was continued and completed by Alexander Raskatov. In Raskatov's version, the three orchestral movements of Schnittke's symphony may be followed by a choral fourth, which is Raskatov's own Nunc Dimittis (in memoriam Alfred Schnittke). This version was premiered in Dresden, Germany, on 16 June 2007. Andrei Boreyko also has a version of the symphony.
