= Reginald Gray (artist) =

Irish painter (1930–2013)

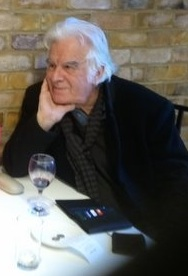
- Gray in 2011
- Born: 1930; Dublin, Ireland
- Died: 29 March 2013 (aged 82–83); Paris, France
- Education: Cecil ffrench Salkeld. ARHA (1953–57)
- Known for: Portrait painter and theatre set designer
- Awards: Sandro Botticelli Prize. Florence, Italy (2004)
- Website: http://www.artmajeur.com/grayportraits

Reginald Gray (1930 – 29 March 2013) was an Irish portrait artist. He studied at The National College of Art (1953) and then moved to London, becoming part of the School of London led by Francis Bacon, Lucian Freud and Frank Auerbach. In 1960, he painted a portrait of Bacon which is in the collection of the National Portrait Gallery in London. He subsequently painted portraits from life of writers, musicians and artists such as Samuel Beckett, Harold Pinter, the French songwriter Barbara, Brendan Behan, Garech Browne, Derry O'Sullivan, Alfred Schnittke, Ted Hughes, Rupert Everett and Yves Saint Laurent. In 1993 Gray had a retrospective exhibition at UNESCO Paris and in 2006, his portrait "The White Blouse" won the Sandro Botticelli Prize in Florence, Italy.

== Life ==
Born in Dublin, Gray grew up on Grove Avenue in Blackrock. His father worked for the Guinness company. Gray studied at All Saints, Blackrock, the Blackrock Technical Institute and the National College of Art and Design, Dublin.

After a short period he left to study under Cecil Ffrench Salkeld ARHA. At the age of nineteen Gray joined The Dublin Atelier, a small group of painters who exhibited at The Dublin Painters Gallery. During this period Gray was inspired by the early works of the French painter Bernard Buffet who had won the Prix de la critique, in Paris in 1948 at the age of 20.

Gray had a studio on Leeson Street in the early 1950s. There he made a wash drawing of the artist Patrick Swift which he used as a base for a large canvas homage to the painter some years later. Gray's first paid work was a commission by University College Dublin to design the setting and costumes for their production of The King's Threshold by W. B. Yeats. The lead in the play was given to the young actor-poet John Jordan. During the preparations and rehearsals Gray painted a portrait of Jordan which now hangs in the collection of The Dublin Writers Museum. At this point the artist Cecil Ffrench Salkeld ARHA (Associate of the Royal Hibernian Academy) took an interest in Gray, and gave him a room in his Dublin home where Gray studied old master techniques. Salkeld was visited by writers, painters and musicians, such as Brian O'Nolan, Arland Ussher, Francis Stuart, Marten Cumberland and John Beckett, cousin of Samuel. Gray painted John Beckett during this period and the portrait now hangs in St. Columba's College, Dublin, where Beckett had his first music lessons. Gray became a close friend of Brendan Behan and was asked to be best man at Behan's wedding. Gray designed many settings for The Pike Theatre including the production of The Rose Tattoo by Tennessee Williams. After the success in Dublin, the play was transferred to The Grand Opera House, Belfast and Gray travelled there to redesign and create the much larger settings need for the bigger stage. Look Back in Anger by John Osborne was at the same time running at the Opera House and Gray befriended and sketched the leading actress Jocelyn Britton. Later he designed the sets for Nekrassov by Jean-Paul Sartre which was mounted at The Gate Theatre. Gray later went on a tour of Ireland with The Dublin Repertory Theatre Company designing their productions, including The Wood of the Whispering by M. J. Molloy.

== London ==
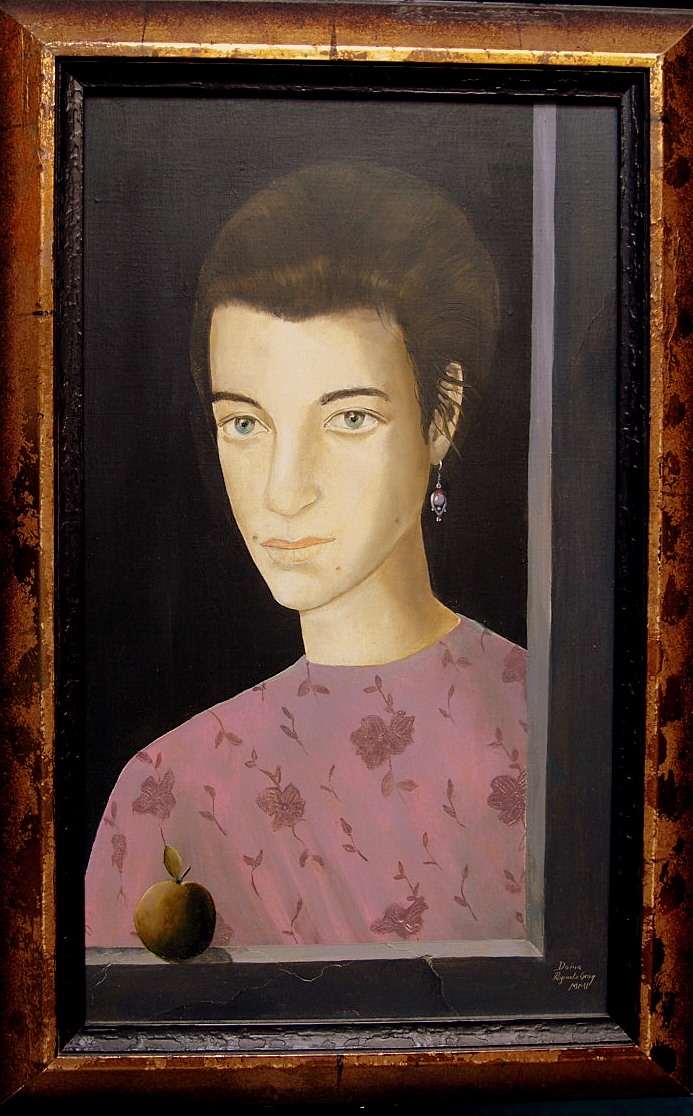
Portrait of Doina by Reginald Gray. Paris, 2001. (egg tempera on canvas)

Gray moved to London in 1957 and lived near the Portobello market, sharing a flat with three Irish actors Donal Donnelly, Brian Phelan and Charles Roberts. Needing more solitude to paint, Gray moved to Bayswater. He got a job in the display department at Whiteleys department store designing and dressing their windows but still painting. In the same year he made a gouache drawing of the Barkers of Kensington department store on Kensington High Street, showing the workmen refreshing the façade of the store. This work is now in the collection of The Museum of London.

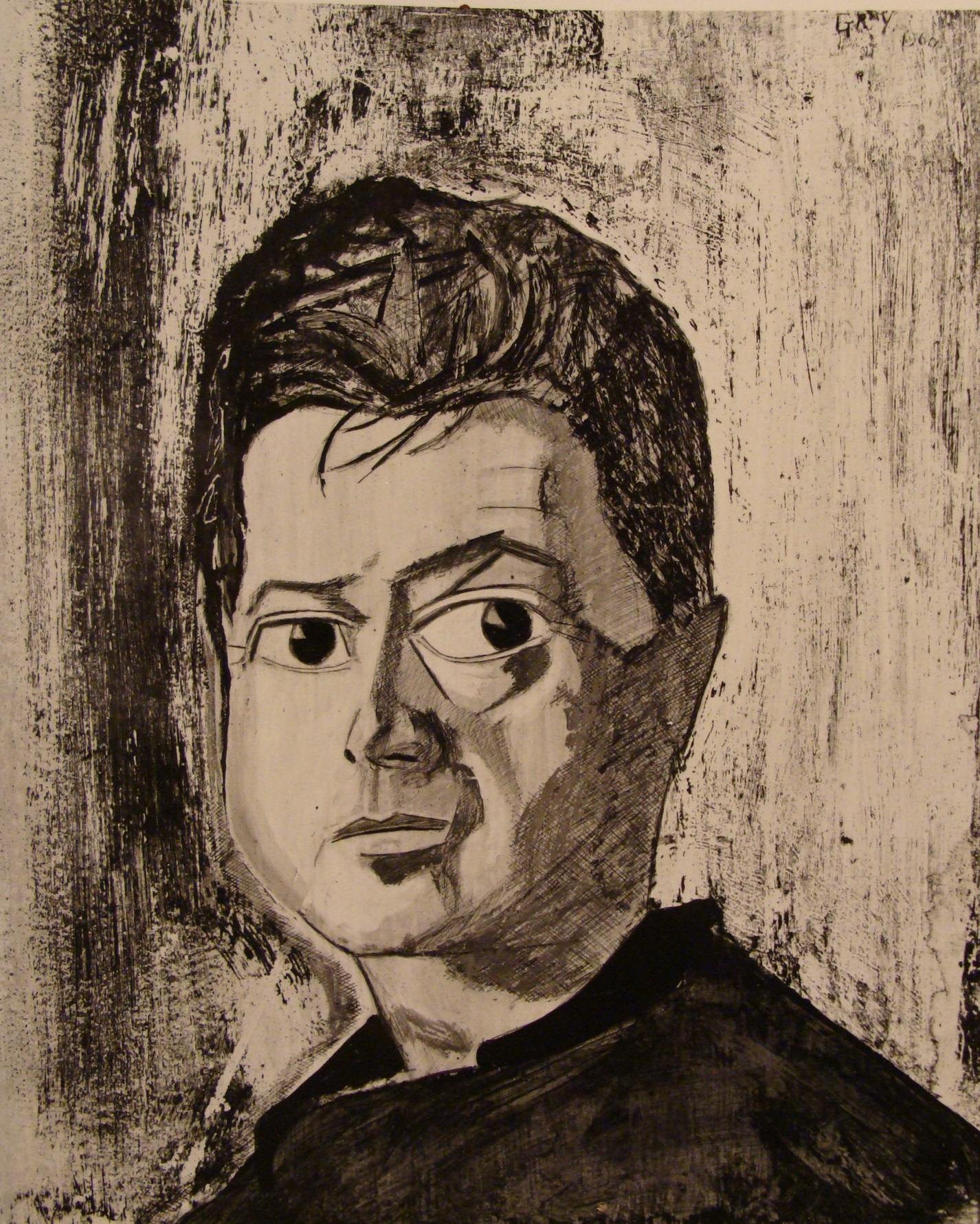
Portrait from life of Francis Bacon by Reginald Gray (National Portrait Gallery, London)

Gray met Catherine Hall in November 1958 and they were married a month later in Caxton Hall, London. In 1960, Eric Holder, owner and director of the gallery Abbott and Holder, invited Gray to hold a solo exhibition. This exhibition received favourable reviews especially from The Arts Review, London. The English film actor Patrick Waddington bought a number of Gray's works and arranged an exhibition for Gray and Aubrey Williams, the painter from Guyana at The Caravan Gallery, New York. Another exhibition for Gray at Abbott and Holder was programmed for the following year which had a further good reception. Alan Simpson, the Pike Theatre director, came to this exhibition and suggested that Gray should paint a portrait of Samuel Beckett.

Gray flew to Paris and worked on the portrait which was then exhibited at The Royal Hibernian Academy, Dublin and is now in a private Dublin collection. In the same year Gray met Francis Bacon in a Bayswater pub. Bacon was curious to see Gray's studio and while they were there Gray made a drawing of Bacon which he later turned into an egg tempera on wood portrait. The portrait was bought by the collector Aubrey Beese, who donated it to the National Portrait Gallery, London in 1975, where it remains today. By 1963 Gray's marriage was failing, and he moved to Paris.

== Rouen ==
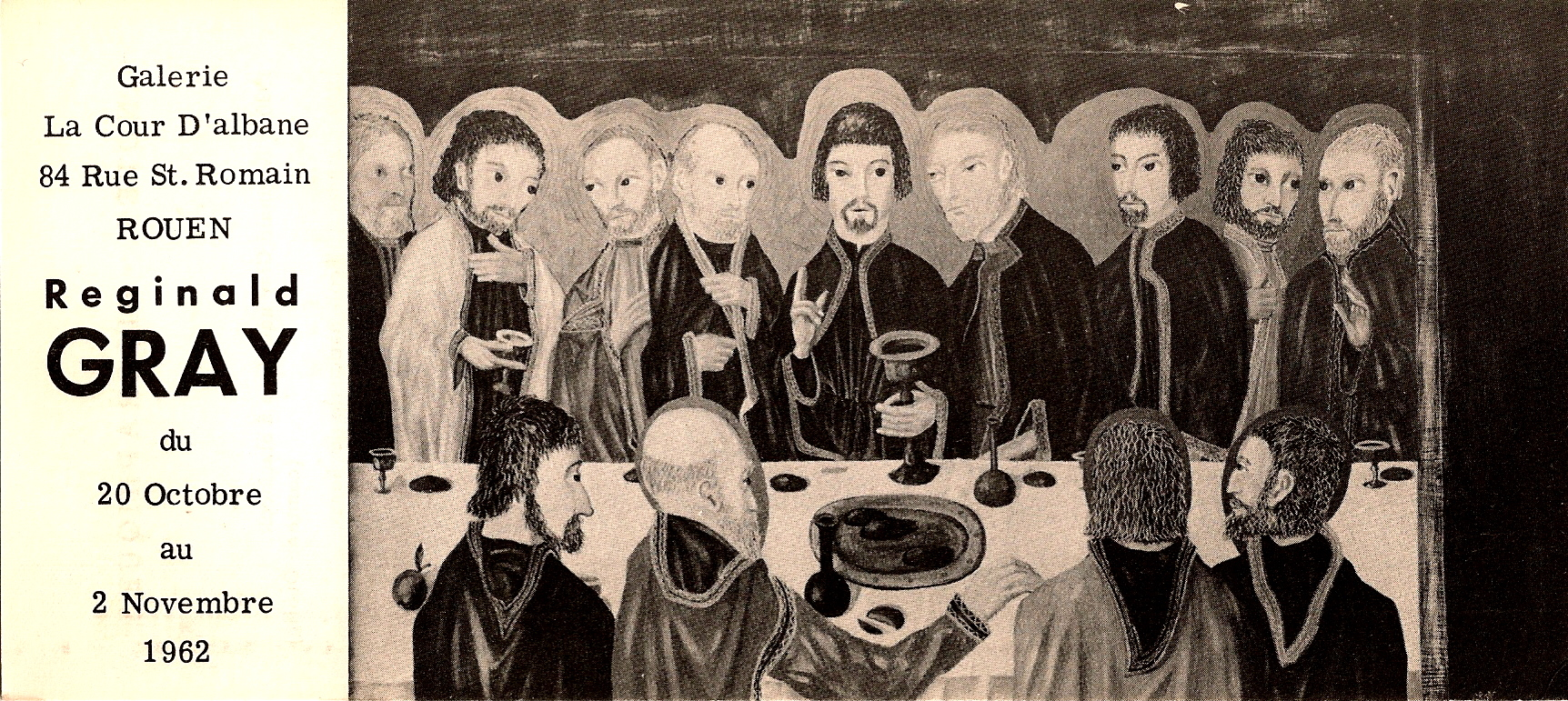
The Last Supper by Reginald Gray. Rouen, 1962.

On his way from London to Paris, Gray stopped in Rouen and came across Le Cour d'Albane, a small art gallery near the cathedral. The director of the gallery Andre Goupil suggested that Gray should hold an exhibition and bring works over from London. Gray agreed and a month later had his first French exhibition. In spite of good reviews, sales were not as good as they had been in London. He found a cheap room on the Rue des Fosses Louis VIII and passed a severe winter there. He became a pavement artist, copying Raphael, Domenico Ghirlandaio, and other Florentine masters on the ground. A year later conditions improved when he got long periods of work as an extra in the Théâtre des Arts de Rouen, mostly in Opera. In spite of the rough life, Gray exhibited at the Salon des Artistes Normands at the Musée des Beaux-Arts for three successive years before he eventually moved on to Paris.

== Paris and Ravenel ==
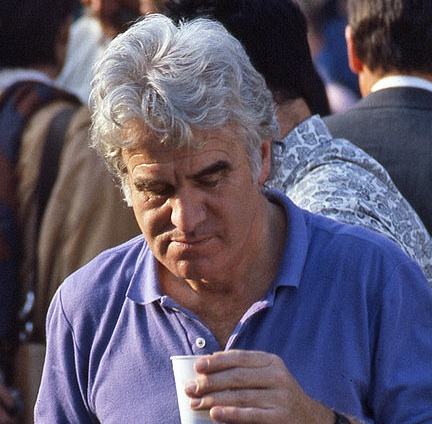
Reginald Gray in Paris in 1986

Having felt that "he had exhausted Rouen and that Rouen had exhausted him", Gray arrived in Paris with little money, in mid 1964, where he would live for the last 50 years of his life. In this year his eldest daughter Eleonore was born. Gray came to live at l'Académie de Feu on the rue Delambre, run by the Hungarian sculptor, László Szabó. About 15 young sculpture students lived and worked there under the supervision of the master. The sculptor with the aid of six of his students built Gray a small room in the studio from wood, plaster and resin with running water and electricity.

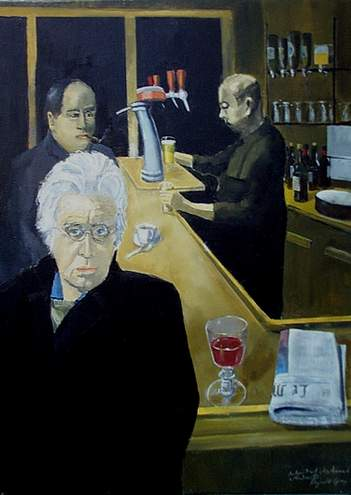
Self-portrait of Gray in a Paris bistro (2008)

In the second year that Gray lived at the academy, Szabó mounted Le Monde apres les Buildings, a large exhibition of Sculpture and Painting, named for the modern high-rise blocks that Szabó hated. The English sculptor Henry Moore and the Italian Marini also exhibited at the exhibition. During this period Gray exhibited at the Daniel Casanova Gallery at the Palais Royale. After three years at the Academy Gray moved from time to time to small ateliers on the left bank such as Rue Descartes and Rue des Saints Pères.

Gray worked as a copy editor at the Paris edition of The New York Times and later drew portraits of people being interviewed by the paper's writers. The subjects included philosopher Jean-Paul Sartre, singer Jacques Brel, and sculptor Alberto Giacometti. During the 1968 student revolution in Paris Gray met the young Australian writer Jill Neville and painted her portrait (National Portrait Gallery, Australia). Gray went on to work at Fairchild Publications and as a fashion photographer for over five years, covering collections in Paris, Milan, Rome and London.

Gray worked as cameraman filming the fashion collections for German Vogue and Swedish Television. Gray directed his first full-length feature Jeu (game, also known as Le Passant) starring Laurent Terzieff, Dirk Kinnane, Pascale de Boysson and Bibi Hure. Gray then lived in the Chateau de Ravenel, 50 miles north of Paris and raised his second daughter Deirdre and son Terence there during a stay that lasted ten years.

== Last years ==
From 1993, Gray taught painting at the Irish College in Paris. In 1996, Gray directed and designed the setting for Letters from Ireland by Belgian playwright Philippe Alkemade, opening at the Wexford Festival and touring Ireland. In this later period he had many one-man exhibitions in Paris galleries such as Galerie Marie de Holmsky, Galerie de la Grande Chaumière, the Galerie Atelier Visconti, and the Salon de Montparnasse, also exhibiting with the American artist Gregory Masurovsky. UNESCO Paris mounted a large retrospective of Gray's works in 1994. Gray's works since that point include a portraits of poet Ted Hughes (at the Bankfield Museum, Halifax), Russian composer Alfred Schnittke, (The Royal College of Music and the Russian Academy of Music, London), and Harold Pinter (1998) not long before Pinter's death.

In 1995, Gray's 1960 portrait of Francis Bacon was hung in the National Portrait Gallery, London. in 2006, Gray's portrait "The White Blouse" won the Sandro Botticelli Prize in Florence, Italy.

== Death ==
Gray died on 29 March 2013 in Paris from stomach cancer, aged 82.

== Collections ==
Some of the public collections in which Gray's work appears are:

- Bankfield Museum, Halifax
- Brunei royal family
- Dublin Writers Museum, Dublin
- Holy Cross church, St Pancras, London
- Museum of London
- National Portrait Gallery, Canberra
- National Portrait Gallery, London
- Royal College of Music, London
- Saint Columba's College, Dublin
