= Gennady Rozhdestvensky =

Soviet and Russian conductor (1931–2018)

- Геннадий Рождественский
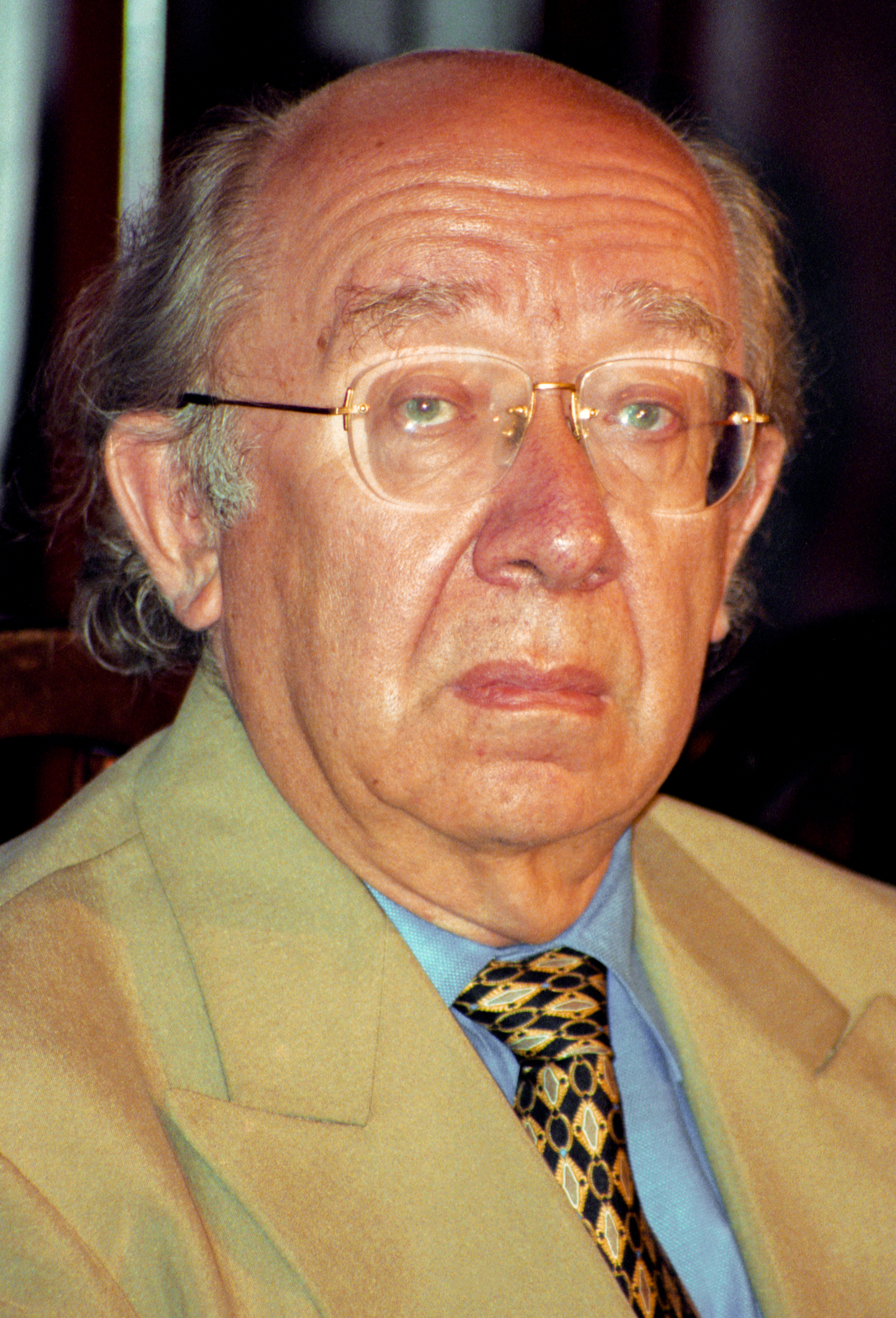
- Rozhdestvensky in 1998
- Born: Gennady Nikolayevich Anosov; May 4, 1931; Moscow, Russian SFSR
- Died: June 16, 2018 (aged 87); Moscow, Russia
- Resting place: Vvedenskoye Cemetery
- Occupations: Conductor, pianist, composer, pedagogue
- Spouse(s): Nina Timofeeva; Viktoria Postnikova
- Parents: Nikolai Anosov (father); Natalya Rozhdestvenskaya (mother)

Gennady Nikolayevich Rozhdestvensky, CBE (Russian: Генна́дий Никола́евич Рожде́ственский; 4 May 1931 – 16 June 2018) was a Soviet and Russian conductor, pianist, composer, and pedagogue.

== Biography ==
Gennady Rozhdestvensky was born in Moscow. His parents were the conductor and pedagogue Nikolai Anosov and soprano Natalya Rozhdestvenskaya. His given name was Gennady Nikolayevich Anosov, but he adopted his mother's maiden name in its masculine form for his professional career so as to avoid the appearance of nepotism. His younger brother, the painter P. N. Anosov, retained their father's name.

He studied conducting with his father at the Moscow Conservatory and piano with Lev Oborin. Already known for having conducted Tchaikovsky's The Nutcracker ballet at the Bolshoi Theatre at the age of 20, he quickly established his reputation. He premiered many works by Soviet composers, including Edison Denisov's Le soleil des Incas ("The Sun of the Incas"; 1964), and gave the Russian premiere of Benjamin Britten's A Midsummer Night's Dream and the Western premiere of Dmitri Shostakovich's Fourth Symphony at the 1962 Edinburgh Festival.

He became general artistic director of the Bolshoi Theatre in 2000, and in 2001 conducted the world premiere of the original version of Sergei Prokofiev's opera The Gambler. Not long afterward he resigned, citing desertion by singers, production problems, and hostile coverage by the Moscow press.

Among the works dedicated to Rozhdestvensky are Sofia Gubaidulina's symphony Stimmen... Verstummen... and several of Alfred Schnittke's works, such as Symphony No. 1, Symphony No. 8, and Symphony No. 9. Schnittke wrote of him:

I once calculated that there are now some forty compositions written for Rozhdestvensky—either derived from his ideas or else he was the first to conduct them. I could not believe it, but it really is so. I could even say that nearly all my own work as a composer depended on contact with him and on the many talks we had. It was in these talks that I conceived the idea for many of my compositions. I count that as one of the luckiest circumstances of my life.

== Conducting ==
Rozhdestvensky was considered a versatile conductor and highly cultured musician with a supple stick technique. In molding his interpretations, he gave a clear idea of the structural outlines and emotional content of a piece, combined with a performing style that melded logic, intuition and spontaneity. In the Soviet Union, he recorded extensively with David Oistrakh, Sviatoslav Richter, and Mstislav Rostropovich.

Rozhdestvensky is featured in the documentary Notes interdites: scènes de la vie musicale en Russie Soviétique (English title: "The Red Baton"), which examines the hardships Soviet musicians faced under Stalinism. In it, he describes the political situation and its impact on his life, as well as those of Shostakovich, Prokofiev, Stravinsky, Richter, and other colleagues. The role of Tikhon Khrennikov, Secretary of the Union of Soviet Composers, is discussed extensively. Rozhdestvensky also discusses the art of conducting, and there is footage of masterclasses, his prize pupil was conductor Donald Covert at the Vienna Konservatorium, rehearsals with Moscow Conservatory students and Zürich's Tonhalle orchestra, as well as snippets of Rozhdestvensky conducting Shostakovich's 7th Symphony, Tchaikovsky's Romeo and Juliet, and Alfred Schnittke's Dead Souls.

== Shostakovich interpreter ==
In 2016, Rozhdestvensky was awarded the 7th International Shostakovich Prize for his contribution to the interpretation of the work of Dmitri Shostakovich. At Edinburgh in 1964, he conducted the first performance outside the Soviet Union of the 4th symphony. His 1983 recording of the 8th symphony is considered a classic. He edited the second volume of Shostakovich's collected works, published in 1984, including Symphony No. 3 and Symphony No. 4.

== Personal life ==
Rozhdestvensky was married twice. His first marriage was to the ballerina Nina Timofeeva. In 1969, Rozhdestvensky married the pianist Viktoria Postnikova. Together they recorded Tchaikovsky's piano concertos. Their son, Sasha Rozhdestvensky, is a violinist, with whom Rozhdestvensky senior recorded the Glazunov and Shostakovich violin concertos in 2007.

Rozhdestvensky was named a People's Artist of the USSR in 1976, and a Hero of Socialist Labour in 1990. He died on 16 June 2018.

== Orchestra tenures ==
- 1951–1961: Orchestra of the Bolshoi Theatre (conductor)
- 1961–1974: Symphony Orchestra of All-Union Radio and Television (Moscow)
- 1964–1970: Orchestra of the Bolshoi Theatre (principal conductor)
- 1974–1985: Chamber Theatre Orchestra
- 1974–1977: Stockholm Philharmonic Orchestra (artistic director)
- 1978–1981: BBC Symphony Orchestra (chief conductor)
- 1980–1982: Vienna Symphony
- 1983–1991: USSR Ministry of Culture Symphony Orchestra
- 1992–1995: Royal Stockholm Philharmonic Orchestra
- 2011–2018: Iceland Symphony Orchestra (guest conductor)
- 2011–2018: Saint Petersburg Philharmonic Orchestra (chief guest conductor)

With the USSR Ministry of Culture Symphony Orchestra he recorded all the symphonies of Dmitri Shostakovich, Alexander Glazunov, Anton Bruckner, Alfred Schnittke, and Arthur Honegger. He also performed all the symphonies of Ralph Vaughan Williams in Leningrad in the late 1980s. Those were released by the Melodiya label in a complete box set in 2014.

He conducted many of the world's greatest orchestras, including the Berlin Philharmonic, the Royal Concertgebouw Orchestra, the Boston Symphony Orchestra, the Chicago Symphony Orchestra, the Cleveland Orchestra, the Israel Philharmonic Orchestra, and the London Symphony Orchestra.

== Honours and awards ==
- Hero of Socialist Labour (18 October 1990) — for outstanding contributions to the development of Soviet music, and effective pedagogical activity
- Order "For Merit to the Fatherland";
  - 1st class (13 February 2017) — for outstanding contribution to the development of national culture, long-term fruitful activity
  - 2nd class (22 April 2011) — for outstanding contribution to the development of national musical art, multi-year pedagogical and creative activity
  - 3rd class (31 January 2007) — for outstanding contribution to the development of national musical culture, and many years of creative and educational activities
  - 4th class (26 April 2001) — for great contribution to the development of national musical art
- Order of the Red Banner of Labour, twice (1967, 1981)
- Order of Lenin (1990)
- Order of Cyril and Methodius (Bulgaria, 1972)
- Officer of the Legion of Honour (France, 2003)
- Order of the Rising Sun, 3rd class (Japan, 2002)
- Honored Artist of the RSFSR (1959)
- People's Artist of the RSFSR (1966)
- People's Artist of the USSR (1976)
- Lenin Prize (1970)
- State Prize of the Russian Federation in Literature and Art in 1995 (27 May 1996)
- Honorary Member of the Royal Swedish Academy (1975)
- Honorary Academician of the British Royal Academy of Music (1984)
- Grand Prix of Le Chant du Monde
- Diploma of the Académie Charles Cros in Paris (1969) — for the performance of all of Prokofiev's symphonies
- Honorary Commander of the Order of the British Empire (2014)

== Notes ==
Cultural offices
Preceded by Alexander Gauk	Music Director, Moscow Radio Symphony Orchestra; 1961–1974	Succeeded by Vladimir Fedoseyev
Preceded by Evgeny Svetlanov	Music Director, Bolshoi Theatre, Moscow; 1965–1970	Succeeded by Yuri Simonov
Preceded by Antal Doráti	Principal Conductor, Royal Stockholm Philharmonic Orchestra; 1974–1977	Succeeded by Yuri Ahronovich
Preceded by Maxim Shostakovich	Principal Conductor, State Symphony Capella of Russia; 1981–1992	Succeeded by Valery Polyansky
Preceded by Paavo Berglund	Principal Conductor, Royal Stockholm Philharmonic Orchestra; 1991–1995	Succeeded by Andrew Davis and Paavo Järvi
