= List of choral symphonies =

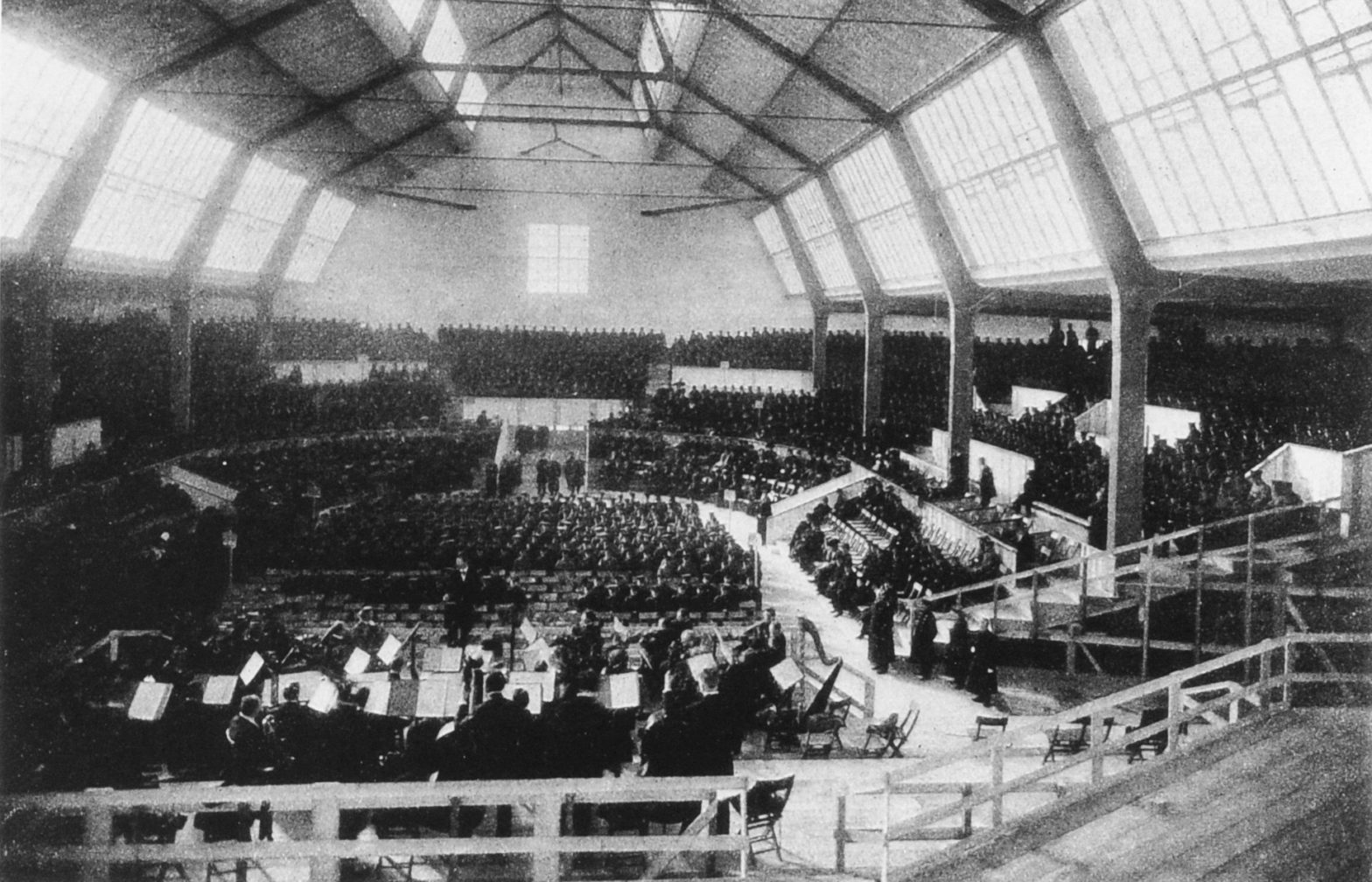
Dress rehearsal for the world premiere of the Mahler's Eighth Symphony

The following is a list of choral symphonies.

== Symphonies for chorus and orchestra ==
Works are listed in chronological order. Works with an asterisk (*) indicate that text is used throughout the entire composition.

=== 19th century ===
- Symphony No. 9, Op. 125, by Ludwig van Beethoven (1824), the "Choral Symphony"
- Roméo et Juliette, Op. 17, by Hector Berlioz (1839)
- Grande symphonie funèbre et triomphale, Op. 15, by Hector Berlioz (1840)
- Lobgesang (also called Symphony No. 2 in B♭ major), Op. 52, by Felix Mendelssohn (1840)
- Faust Symphony, by Franz Liszt (1854)
- Dante Symphony, by Franz Liszt (1856)
- Kullervo, Op. 7, by Jean Sibelius (1892); text from the Kalevala
- Symphony No. 2 in C minor, Resurrection, by Gustav Mahler (1894)
- Symphony No. 3 in D minor, by Gustav Mahler (1896)
- Symphony No. 7, Op. 40, Korsymfoni, by Asger Hamerik (1897, rev. 1901-1906)

=== 1900–1949 ===
- Symphony No. 1 in E major, Op. 26, by Alexander Scriabin (1900)
- Symphony No. 3, by Guy Ropartz (1905)
- Symphony No. 8 in E♭ major, by Gustav Mahler (1907) *
- A Sea Symphony (Symphony No. 1), by Ralph Vaughan Williams (1909) *
- Der 100. Psalm, by Max Reger (1910) *
- Natursymphonie, by Siegmund von Hausegger (1911)
- Symphony No. 4 in E♭ minor, Op. 55, by Joseph Ryelandt (1912)
- The Bells, Op. 35, by Sergei Rachmaninoff (1913) *
- Symphony No. 4, by Charles Ives (1916)
- Symphony No. 3, Op. 27, Song of the Night, by Karol Szymanowski (1916)
- Symphony No. 6, Op. 48, by Charles Tournemire (1917–18)
- A Symphony: New England Holidays, by Charles Ives (1919)
- Symphony No. 1 "The Gothic", by Havergal Brian (1919-1927)
- Symphony No. 3 in C major, Op. 21, by George Enescu (1921)
- Symphony No. 1, KSS30, by Kaikhosru Shapurji Sorabji (1921–22)
- Symphony No. 6, The Revolutionary, by Nikolai Myaskovsky (1921-1923)
- Choral Symphony, by Gustav Holst (1924)
- Symphony No. 5, Der Schnitter Tod, by Julius Röntgen (1926)
- Symphony No. 8, Minder ved Amalienborg, BVN. 193, by Rued Langgaard (1926-28, rev. 1929-1934)
- Symphony No. 2 in B major, Op. 14, To October, by Dmitri Shostakovich (1927)
- Symphony No. 6, Rijck God, wie sal ic claghen, by Julius Röntgen (1928) *
- Symphony No. 2, O Holy Lord, by Jan Maklakiewicz (1928)
- Symphony No. 3 in E♭ major, Op. 20, The First of May, by Dmitri Shostakovich (1929)
- Morning Heroes, by Arthur Bliss (1930) *
- Symphony of Psalms, by Igor Stravinsky (1930) *
- Symphony No. 4, Das Siegeslied, by Havergal Brian (1933) *
- Symphony No. 4, Poem for the Komsomol Fighters, by Lev Knipper (1933/1965)
- Symphony No. 3, The Muses, by Cyril Scott (1937)
- Symphony No. 15, Sørstormen, BVN. 375, by Rued Langgaard (1937, rev. 1949)
- Symphony No. 4, Folksong Symphony, by Roy Harris (1940)
- Symphony No. 4, The Revelation of Saint John, by Hilding Rosenberg (1940) *
- Symphony No. 6, by Erwin Schulhoff (1940)
- Symphony No. 9, Op. 93, Everlasting Times after J. Tuwim and V. Bronievsky, by Mieczyslaw Weinberg (1940-67)
- Symphony No. 4, Op. 29, Sinfonia Sacra, by Vagn Holmboe (1941) *
- Symphony No. 2, KSS72, Jāmī, by Kaikhosru Shapurji Sorabji (1942–51)
- Symphony No. 1, Proti Simfonia, by Mikis Theodorakis (1943-45)
- The Airborne Symphony, by Marc Blitzstein (1943–46)
- Den judiska sången, by Moses Pergament (1944)
- Symphony No. 6, In Memoriam, by Alexandre Tansman (1944)
- Symphony No. 5, The Keeper of the Garden, by Hilding Rosenberg (1945)
- Odysseus (Symphony No. 2), by Armstrong Gibbs (first performed 1946)
- Symphony No. 3, Te Deum, by Darius Milhaud (1946)
- Spring Symphony, by Benjamin Britten (1947) *
- Symphony No. 5, by Dimitrie Cuclin (1947)
- Suite (Symphony no. 14), Morgenen, BVN. 336, by Rued Langgaard (1947-48, rev. 1951)
- Symphony No. 4, The Cycle, by Peter Mennin (1948)
- Symphony No. 10, by Dimitrie Cuclin (1949)

=== 1950–1999 ===
- Symphony No. 12, by Dimitrie Cuclin (1951)
- Symphony No. 8, by Henry Cowell (1952) *
- Symphony No. 10, Amerindia, by Heitor Villa-Lobos (1952-1953)
- Symphony No. 4, da Paz, by Cláudio Santoro (1953)
- Symphony No. 9, Op. 54, Sinfonia Visionaria, by Kurt Atterberg (1956) *
- Deutsche Sinfonie, by Hanns Eisler (1957) *
- Nirvana Symphony, by Toshiro Mayuzumi (1958)
- Symphony No. 12, Op. 188, Choral, by Alan Hovhaness (1960)
- Symphony No. 13 in B♭ minor, Op. 113, Babi Yar, by Dmitri Shostakovich (1962) *
- Symphony No. 6, Op. 79, after Leib Kvitko, Shmuel Halkin and M. Lukonin, by Mieczyslaw Weinberg (1962-63)
- Symphony No. 3, Kaddish, by Leonard Bernstein (1963)
- Symphony No. 8, Op. 83, Flowers of Poland after J. Tuwim, by Mieczyslaw Weinberg (1964) *
- Symphony No. 2, Op. 28, Marina, after Marina Tsvetaeva by Boris Tishchenko (1964) *
- Symphony No. 10, Abraham Lincoln, by Roy Harris (1965)
- Vocal Symphony, by Ivana Loudová (1965)
- Choral Symphony, by Jean Coulthard (1967)
- Sinfonia by Luciano Berio (1969)
- Symphony No. 1, Die Heimat, by Kurt Graunke (1969)
- Symphony No. 11, Op. 101, Festive Symphony after various revolutionary poets, by Mieczyslaw Weinberg (1969)
- Symphony No. 2, Op. 31, Copernicus, by Henryk Górecki (1972) *
- Symphony No. 9, Sinfonia Sacra, Op. 140, The Resurrection, by Edmund Rubbra (1972) *
- Symphony No. 3, The Icy Mirror, by Malcolm Williamson (1972) *
- Symphony No. 2, by Avet Terterian (1972)
- Symphony No. 24, Op. 273, Majnun, by Alan Hovhaness (1973)
- Symphony No. 12 De döda på torget (The Dead of the Square), by Allan Pettersson (1973–1974) *
- Symphony No. 2, Sinfonia mistica, by Kenneth Leighton (1974)
- Symphony No. 13, Bicentennial Symphony, by Roy Harris (1976)
- Symphony No. 3, by Wolfgang Rihm (1976-77)
- Symphony No. 5, by Camargo Guarnieri (1977)
- Symphony No. 7, A Sea Symphony, by Howard Hanson (1977) *
- Sinfonia fidei, Op. 95, by Alun Hoddinott (1977)
- Symphony No. 15, Op. 119, I Believe in This Earth after M. Dudin, by Mieczyslaw Weinberg (1977)
- Symphony No. 2, Saint Florian, by Alfred Schnittke (1979)
- Symphony No. 2, The Song of the Earth, by Mikis Theodorakis (1980-81)
- Symphony No. 3, by Mikis Theodorakis (1981-2) *
- Harmonium, by John Adams (1981) *
- Symphony No. 6, by Avet Terterian (1981) *
- Symphony No. 7, Spring-Symphony, by Mikis Theodorakis (1982) *
- Symphony No. 3, Sinfonia da Requiem, by József Soproni (1983)
- Symphony No. 6, Aphorisms, by Einar Englund (1984)
- Symphony No. 4, by Alfred Schnittke (1984)
- Symphony No. 5, by Anatol Vieru (1984-85) *
- Symphony No. 58, Sinfonia Sacra, Op. 389, by Alan Hovhaness (1985)
- Symphony No. 18, Op. 138, War, there is no word more cruel after S. Orlov and A. Tvardovsky, by Mieczyslaw Weinberg (1986)
- Symphony No. 4, Symphony of Choirs, by Mikis Theodorakis (1986-87) *
- Symphony No. 7, Pietas by Erkki-Sven Tüür (1987)
- The Dawn Is at Hand, by Malcolm Williamson (1987–89) *
- Symphony No. 3, Journey without Distance, by Richard Danielpour (1989) *
- Symphony No. 7, Op. 116, The Keys of the Kingdom, by Jan Hanuš (1990)
- Leaves of Grass: A Choral Symphony, by Robert Strassburg (1992)
- Mythodea, by Vangelis (1993) *
- Lili'uokalani Symphony by Lalo Schifrin (1993)
- Symphony No. 2, by Philip Bračanin (1995/1997)
- Symphony No. 7, Seven Gates of Jerusalem, by Krzysztof Penderecki (1996)
- Symphony No. 6, Choral, by Carl Vine (1996) *
- Symphony No. 9, by Hans Werner Henze (1997) *
- Symphony 1997: Heaven - Earth - Mankind, by Tan Dun (1997)
- Symphony No. 5, Choral, by Philip Glass (1999) *
- Symphony No. 4, The Gardens, by Ellen Taaffe Zwilich (1999)
- River Symphony, by Sean O'Boyle (1999)
- Symphony No. 2, by Lowell Liebermann (1999)
- 2000 Today: A World Symphony for the Millenium, by Tan Dun (1999) *

=== 21st century ===
- Symphony No. 9, The Spirit of Time, by Robert Kyr (2000)
- Symphony No. 4, Star Chant, by Ross Edwards (2001)
- Dante Symphony No. 4, Purgatory, from choreo-symphonic cycle Beatrice, by Boris Tishchenko (2003)
- Symphony No. 7, Toltec, by Philip Glass (2005) *
- Symphony No. 8, Songs of Transitoriness, by Krzysztof Penderecki (2005)
- Symphony No. 2, Festinemus amare homines, by Pawel Lukaszewski (2005)
- Symphony No. 3, Planet Earth, by Johan de Meij (2006)
- Symphony No. 1, Symphony of Providence, by Pawel Lukaszewski (2008)
- Symphony No. 3, Poems and Prayers, by Mohammed Fairouz (2010)
- Symphony No. 3, Symphony of Angels, by Pawel Lukaszewski (2010)
- Dreams of the Fallen, by Jake Runestad, a choral symphony-concerto for solo piano, chorus, and orchestra set to texts of the poet Brian Turner (2013)
- Symphony No. 10, Alla ricerca di Borromini, Op. 327, by Peter Maxwell Davies (2013)
- Unfinished Remembering by Paul Spicer (2014), a choral symphony for baritone and soprano soloists, orchestra, semi-chorus, and chorus set to a text by Euan Tait.
- Symphony No. 11, Hillsborough Memorial, by Michael Nyman (2014)
- KUNE, by Arnaud Fillion "Arnito" (2018), multi-language symphony for peace (for choir, soloists and orchestra).
- The Legend of Bijan and Manijeh by Farhad Poupel (2020), a choral symphony-concerto for solo piano, chorus, and orchestra.
- The Joyful Mysteries by Daniel Knaggs, a choral symphony for soloists, orchestra, and chorus. (2023)
- TEARFLOODS (HOMAGE TO MIYAZAKI) by Robin Haigh (2025)

== Symphonies for unaccompanied chorus ==
Works are listed in chronological order. These works are scored without orchestra, but the composers nevertheless titled or sub-titled them as symphonies.

- Atalanta in Calydon, by Granville Bantock (1911)
- Vanity of Vanities, by Granville Bantock (1913)
- A Pageant of Human Life, by Granville Bantock (1913)
- Symphony for Voices, by Roy Harris (1935)
- Symphony for Voices, by Malcolm Williamson (1962)
- Know Yourself - Symphony for Mixed Choir a cappella, by Alexander Shchetynsky (2003)

== Notes ==
Sources

- Kennedy, Michael (1985). The Oxford Dictionary of Music. Oxford and New York: Oxford University Press. ISBN 0-19-311333-3.
