= Choral symphony (disambiguation) =

A choral symphony is a large musical composition including an orchestra, a choir, and soloists.

Choral symphony may also refer to:

- Symphony No. 9 (Beethoven) or the "Choral" Symphony, 1824
- Choral Symphony (Dyson), a 1910 composition, rediscovered in 2014, by George Dyson
- Choral Symphony (Holst), a 1925 composition by Gustav Holst

== See also ==
- List of choral symphonies
- Category:Choral symphonies
