= Symphony No. 4 (Schnittke) =

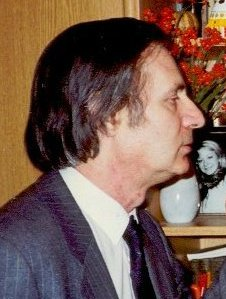
Alfred Schnittke in 1989

Russian composer Alfred Schnittke wrote his Symphony No. 4 in 1983. It is a choral symphony, written for tenor, countertenor, chorus, and orchestra. It was first performed on April 12, 1984, in Moscow.

== Structure ==
The symphony is written in a single movement of 22 variations and is approximately 45 minutes in length. Ronald Weitzman writes, "The form of Schnittke's Fourth Symphony [is] at once cross-shaped and spherical.... The composer draws musically on the three main strands of Christianity—Orthodox, Catholic, Protestant—while underlying this is a three-note semitone interval motif representing synagogue chant, thus symbolizing the Jewish source of Christianity." The result, Ivan Moody writes, is that Schnittke "attempts to reconcile elements of znamennïy and Gregorian chant, the Lutheran chorale and Synagogue cantillation ... within a dense, polyphonic orchestral texture"

A tenor and a countertenor also sing wordlessly at two points in the symphony. Words are saved for a finale in which all four types of church music are used contrapuntally as a four-part choir sings the Ave Maria. The choir can choose whether to sing the Ave Maria in Russian or Latin. The programmatic intent of using these different types of music, Schnittke biographer Alexander Ivashkin writes, is an insistence by the composer "on the idea ... of the unity of humanity, a synthesis and harmony among various manifestations of belief."

== Overview ==
While in Vienna in 1980, Schnittke decided to embrace Christianity and be baptized but was not sure what church to join. His father had been born Jewish but was an atheist and both his parents had been devoted to Communist ideals. He was drawn to Catholicism but felt that, as a Russian, a move toward Russian Orthodoxy might be more appropriate. Schnittke decided to be baptized as a Catholic but made his confessions twice yearly afterwards to a Russian Orthodox priest who would visit his Moscow apartment.

The Fourth Symphony reflects Schnittke's religious dilemma. The symphony is based on the traditional 15 Mysteries of the Rosary of the Roman Catholic Church, which retrace the life of Jesus through the eyes of his mother Mary. In the 22 variations that make up the symphony's single movement, (Note: The actual number of variations in the Schnittke Fourth Symphony is "a subtle non-synchronicity," of the piece, considering the "3 by 5 scheme" of the Rosary upon which these variations are reportedly based. Weitzman, notes for Chandos 9463, 5.) Schnittke "follows the canons of the Passions of Jesus Christ," depicting "decisive moments in Christ's life" and, as in the Second Symphony, giving a detailed musical commentary on what is being portrayed.

Alexander Ivashkin writes that when the symphony received its first performance in Paris, "Schnittke was generally pleased with the European precision of the playing. He nevertheless felt it should be sung by a Russian Choir. A Western performance might be brilliant, but it would inevitably lack the Russian intensity of extreme religious sensation."

== Instrumentation ==
The symphony is scored for solo tenor, counter-tenor, a chamber choir and a chamber orchestra comprising the following instruments:

Woodwinds

1 flutes (doubling alto flute)
1 oboe
1 clarinet
1 bassoon

Brass

1 horns
1 trumpets
1 trombones

Percussion

timpani

gong
tam tam
tubular bells

Keyboards

glockenspiel
vibraphone
celesta
harpsichord
piano

Strings

1 violin I
1 violin II
1 viola
1 cello
1 double bass

It was published by Sovetsky kompozitor in 1986.
