= Centre for Russian Music =

Research centre based at Goldsmiths, University of London

The Centre for Russian Music is a research centre based at Goldsmiths, University of London. The main purpose of the centre is to promote research, publication and performance. It offers interdisciplinary activities focused on cultural, social, political and musical problems of Russian modern history and based on its archival collections. The Centre for Russian Music works in collaboration with the Serge Prokofiev Archive and the Alfred Schnittke Archive which contains manuscripts, facsimiles of all scores (including unfinished ones), private papers, sketches, photos, films, tapes of Schnittke's own performances and talks, all published scores, books and articles on Schnittke, and all existing recordings of his music. The Centre for Russian Music works under the supervision of an international board of advisors. Its director until 2014 was the cellist and musicologist Alexander Ivashkin. The centre is used by researchers and students from many countries, and makes its materials available to any interested scholar. Current researchers included Blanc Wan.

== Serge Prokofiev Archive ==
The Serge Prokofiev Archive is the only archive in the world wholly dedicated to this composer. Established at Goldsmiths College in 1994, the Archive was an initiative of Lina Prokofiev, the composer's first wife. After her death in 1989, the Foundation decided to set up and support an archive where all available materials relating to Prokofiev, including family papers, would be regrouped under one roof.

== Alfred Schnittke Archive ==
The Archive was founded in 1999 and contains facsimile copies of almost every score that Alfred Schnittke completed, many original and unfinished scores, sketches, documentary material relating to premieres/commissions and an extensive collection of secondary sources relating to Schnittke's work.

== Special collections ==
- Malcolm Henbury Ballan's collection of Russian Piano Music (including many rare first editions);
- Malcolm Henbury Ballan's collection of orchestral and chamber scores;
- Special collection of post-Soviet scores, recordings and document;
- Nikolai Korndorf's archive;
- Giles Roche's collection of the scores, recordings and books

== Partnership Institution ==
The Centre for Russian Music has collaborated with following research and educational institutions:

- Centre for Contemporary Music, Moscow, Russia;
- The Russian Music Academy, Moscow, Russia;
- The Alfred Schnittke Academy, Hamburg, Germany;
- The State Institute of Arts Studies, Moscow;
- The State Schnittke Institute, Moscow;
- The Rakhmaninov Institute, Tambov, Russia;
- The Rutgers University, USA;
- The Ohio State University, USA;
- The Yale University, USA (The Prokofiev Society of America);
- The University of California, USA;
- The University d’Evry, France;
- The Shostakovich Centre, Paris, France;
- The D.D.Shostakovich Archives, Moscow, Russia;
- The Rostropovich Archive, St Petersburg, Russia;
- The Saratov State Conservatoire (The Schnittke Centre), Saratov, Russia;
- The Russian State Archive for Literature and Arts (RGALI);
- The Russian Composers Union Library and Archives;
- The State Museum of Musical Culture Archive;
- The University of Canterbury, New Zealand;
- The University of Manchester;
- The University of Edinburgh (Slavic Languages Department);
- The SSEES, University of London;
- The British Film Institute;
- The Royal Musical Association;
- The Moscow Conservatory, Russia;
- The Glinka Conservatoire, Nizhni Novgorod, Russia;
- The Compozitor Publishers, St Petersburg, Russia;
- The Bolshoi Opera House and Archives, Moscow, Russia;
- The Birmingham University;
- The Trinity Laban Conservatoire of Music and Dance, London;
- The School of Advanced Studies, Institute of Musical Research, London
