= Symphony No. 7 (Hanson) =

Musical work; choral symphony in three movements composed by Howard Hanson

Symphony No. 7 by Howard Hanson, subtitled A Sea Symphony, is a choral symphony commissioned by the National Music Camp in 1974 to commemorate its fiftieth season at Interlochen, Michigan, in 1977. It was first performed at the 1977 Interlochen Summer Music Camp by the International Youth Orchestra with singers made up of other students, staff and faculty. It was conducted by the composer.

Dedicated to Joseph E. Maddy, founder of Interlochen and a close friend of Hanson, this was the last major symphonic work written by Hanson. Like Ralph Vaughan Williams's first symphony and the symphony for voices by Roy Harris, Hanson's symphony is set to texts from Leaves of Grass by Walt Whitman describing a voyage of ocean exploration as a metaphor of life transiting into death.

About composing the work, Hanson remarked, "I had wanted to write the piece all my life and when I finally got at it – I was eighty – I had no trouble. It came out just as if I were thirty or even twenty-five, and I had no inhibitions about it. I didn't work on it, I didn't go over it, I didn't redo it – whoosh – it came like that!"

The symphony is set in three movements:

1. "Lo! The Unbounded Sea" (largamente)
2. "The Untold Want" (Adagio)
3. "Joy! Shipmate, Joy!" (Allegretto molto)

== Recordings ==
- World Youth Symphony Orchestra, conducted by Hanson, released by Bay Cities (1989)
- Seattle Symphony, conducted by Gerard Schwarz, released by Delos International (1992, 1998, & 2008) and Naxos Records (2012)
