= Choral symphony =

Musical composition for orchestra and choir

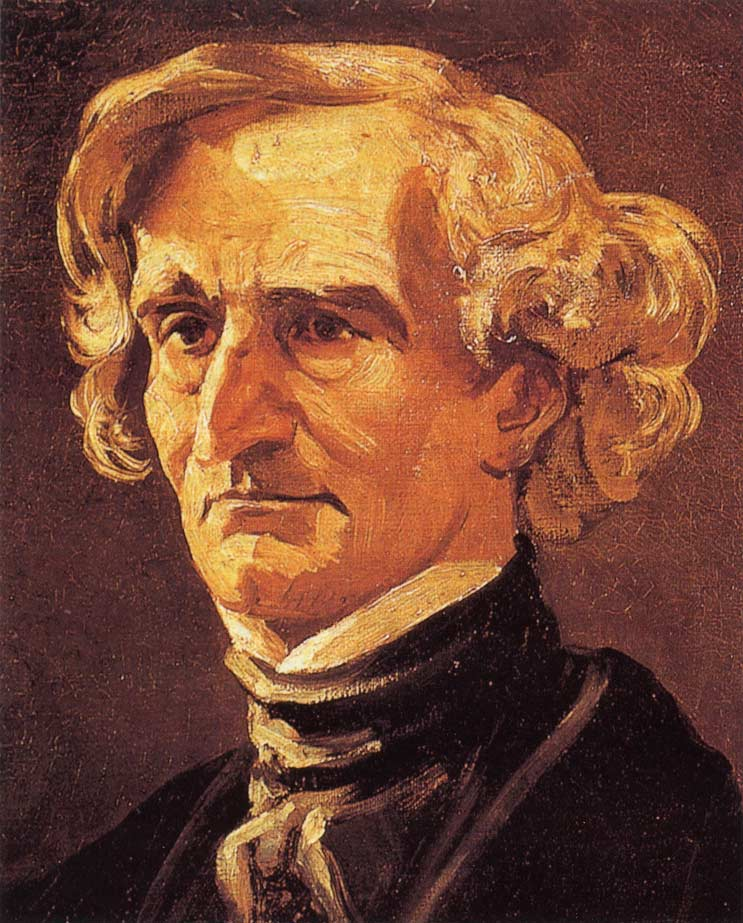
Hector Berlioz was the first to use the term "choral symphony" for a musical composition—his Roméo et Juliette.

A choral symphony is a musical composition for orchestra, choir, and sometimes solo vocalists that, in its internal workings and overall musical architecture, adheres broadly to symphonic musical form. The term "choral symphony" in this context was coined by Hector Berlioz when he described his Roméo et Juliette as such in his five-paragraph introduction to that work. The direct antecedent for the choral symphony is Ludwig van Beethoven's Ninth Symphony. Beethoven's Ninth incorporates part of the ode An die Freude ("Ode to Joy"), a poem by Friedrich Schiller, with text sung by soloists and chorus in the last movement. It is the first example of a major composer's use of the human voice on the same level as instruments in a symphony. (Note: Peter von Winter's Schlacht-Sinfonie also uses a concluding chorus. Written in 1814, it predates Beethoven's Ninth by a decade. However, as an occasional work written in one movement, the Schlacht-Sinfonie "stands outside the generic tradition of the symphony".)

A few 19th-century composers, notably Felix Mendelssohn and Franz Liszt, followed Beethoven in producing choral symphonic works. Notable works in the genre were produced in the 20th century by Gustav Mahler, Igor Stravinsky, Ralph Vaughan Williams, Benjamin Britten and Dmitri Shostakovich, among others. The final years of the 20th century and the opening of the 21st century have seen several new works in this genre, among them compositions by Mikis Theodorakis, Peter Maxwell Davies, Tan Dun, Philip Glass, Hans Werner Henze, Krzysztof Penderecki, William Bolcom and Robert Strassburg.

The term "choral symphony" indicates the composer's intention that the work be symphonic, even with its fusion of narrative or dramatic elements that stems from the inclusion of words. To this end, the words are often treated symphonically to pursue non-narrative ends, by use of frequent repetition of important words and phrases, and the transposing, reordering or omission of passages of the set text. The text often determines the basic symphonic outline, while the orchestra's role in conveying the musical ideas is similar in importance to that of the chorus and soloists. Even with a symphonic emphasis, a choral symphony is often influenced in musical form and content by an external narrative, even in parts where there is no singing.

== History ==
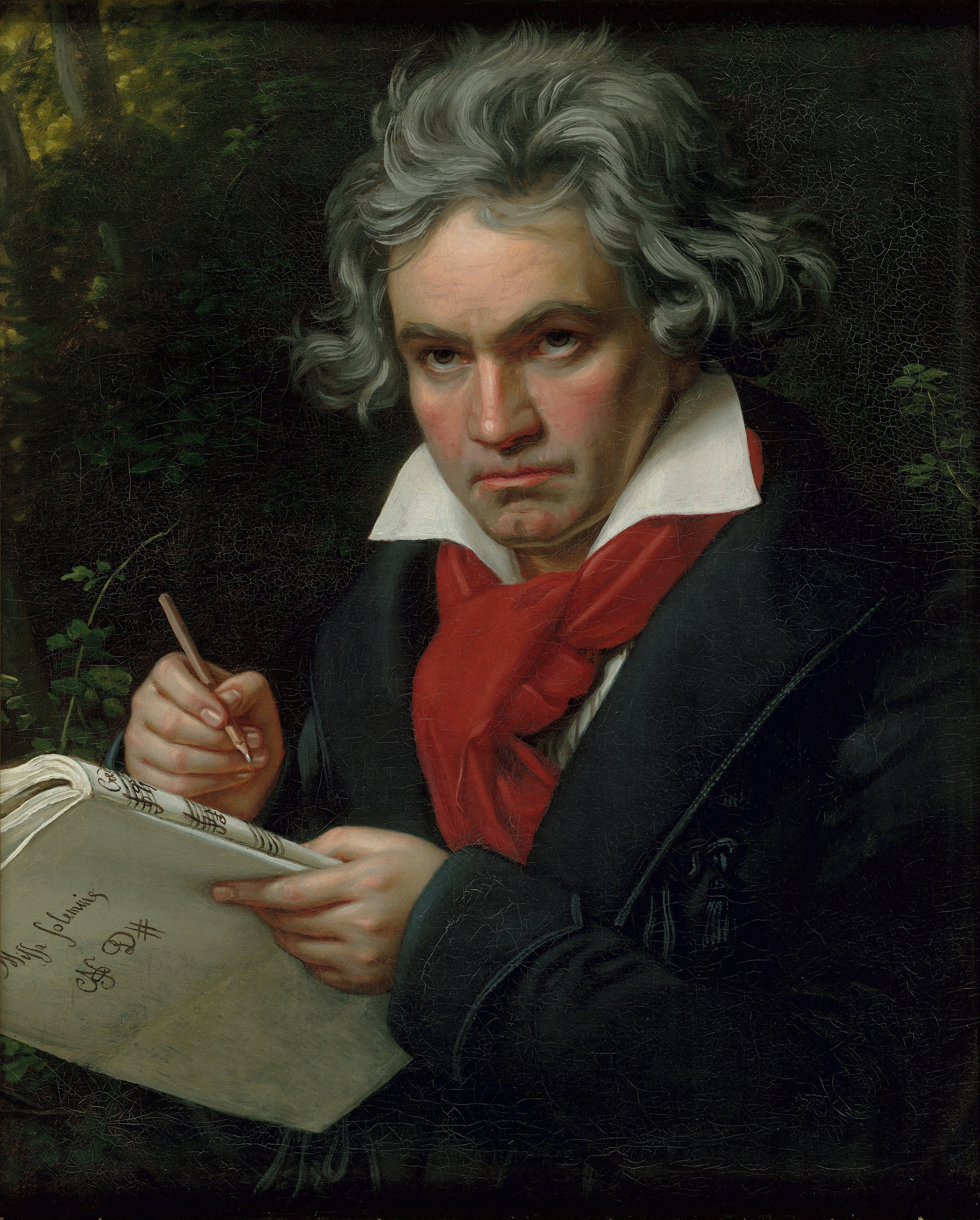
Ludwig van Beethoven redefined the symphony genre by introducing words and voices in his Ninth Symphony.

The symphony had established itself by the end of the 18th century as the most prestigious of instrumental genres. While the genre had been developed with considerable intensity throughout that century and appeared in a wide range of occasions, it was generally used as an opening or closing work; in between would be works that included vocal and instrumental soloists. Because of its lack of written text for focus, it was seen as a vehicle for entertainment rather than for social, moral or intellectual ideas. As the symphony grew in size and artistic significance, thanks in part to efforts in the form by Haydn, Mozart, Beethoven, and Schubert it also amassed greater prestige. A concurrent change in attitude toward instrumental music in general also took place, and the lack of text, once seen as a handicap, became considered a virtue.

In 1824, Beethoven redefined the symphony genre in his Ninth by introducing text and voice into a previously instrumental genre. His doing so sparked a debate on the future of the symphony itself. Beethoven's use of words, according to Richard Wagner, had shown "the limits of purely instrumental music" and marked "the end of the symphony as a vital genre". Others were not sure how to proceed—whether to emulate the Ninth by writing symphonies with choral finales, or to develop the symphony genre in a purely instrumental fashion. Eventually, musicologist Mark Evan Bonds writes, the symphony was seen "as an all-embracing, cosmic drama that transcended the realm of sound alone".

Some composers both emulated and expanded upon Beethoven's model. Berlioz showed in his choral symphony Roméo et Juliette a fresh approach to the epic nature of the symphony as he used voices to blend music and narrative but saved crucial moments of that narrative for the orchestra alone. In doing so, Bonds writes, Berlioz illustrates for subsequent composers "new approaches for addressing the metaphysical in the realm of the symphony". Mendelssohn wrote his Lobgesang as a work for chorus, soloists and orchestra. Labeling the work a "symphony-cantata", he expanded the choral finale to nine movements by including sections for vocal soloists, recitatives and sections for chorus; this made the vocal part longer than the three purely orchestral sections that preceded it. Liszt wrote two choral symphonies, following in these multi-movement forms the same compositional practices and programmatic goals he had established in his symphonic poems.

After Liszt, Mahler took on the legacy of Beethoven in his early symphonies, in what Bonds terms "their striving for a utopian finale". Towards this end Mahler used a chorus and soloists in the finale of his Second Symphony, the "Resurrection". In his Third, he wrote a purely instrumental finale following two vocal movements, and in his Fourth a vocal finale is sung by a solo soprano. After writing his Fifth, Sixth and Seventh Symphonies as purely instrumental works, Mahler returned to the vein of "festival-symphonic ceremonial" in his Eighth Symphony, which integrates text throughout the body of the work. After Mahler, the choral symphony became a more common genre, taking a number of compositional turns in the process. Some composers, such as Britten, Rachmaninoff, Shostakovich and Vaughan Williams, followed symphonic form strictly. Others, such as Havergal Brian, Alfred Schnittke and Karol Szymanowski, chose either to expand symphonic form or to use different symphonic structures altogether.

Throughout the history of the choral symphony, works have been composed for special occasions. One of the earliest was Mendelssohn's Lobgesang, commissioned by the city of Leipzig in 1840 to celebrate the 400th anniversary of Johannes Gutenberg's invention of movable type. More than a century later, Henryk Górecki's Second Symphony, subtitled "Copernican", was commissioned in 1973 by the Kosciuszko Foundation in New York to celebrate the 500th anniversary of the astronomer Nicolaus Copernicus. In between these two works, in 1930, conductor Serge Koussevitzky asked Stravinsky to write the Symphony of Psalms for the 50th anniversary of the Boston Symphony Orchestra and, in 1946, composer Henry Barraud, then head of Radiodiffusion Française, commissioned Darius Milhaud to write his Third Symphony, subtitled "Te Deum", to commemorate the end of World War II.

In the final years of the 20th century and the early years of the 21st, more such choral symphonies were written. Mikis Theodorakis's Symphony No. 4: Of the Chorals Odes was for the 150th anniversary of the University of Athens. Krzysztof Penderecki's Seventh Symphony was for the third millennium of the city of Jerusalem. Tan Dun's Symphony 1997: Heaven Earth Mankind commemorated the transfer of sovereignty over Hong Kong that year to the People's Republic of China. Philip Glass's Fifth Symphony was one of several pieces commissioned to celebrate the beginning of the 21st century.

== General features ==
Like an oratorio or an opera, a choral symphony is a musical work for orchestra, choir and (often) solo voices, although a few have been written for unaccompanied voices. Berlioz, who in 1858 first coined the term when describing his work Roméo et Juliette, explained the distinctive relationship he envisaged between voice and orchestra:

Even though voices are often used, it is neither a concert opera nor a cantata, but a choral symphony. If there is singing, almost from the beginning, it is to prepare the listener's mind for the dramatic scenes whose feelings and passions are to be expressed by the orchestra. It is also to introduce the choral masses gradually into the musical development, when their too sudden appearance would have damaged the compositions's unity....

Unlike oratorios or operas, which are generally structured dramaturgically into arias, recitatives and choruses, a choral symphony is structured like a symphony, in movements. It may employ the traditional four-movement scheme of a fast opening movement, slow movement, scherzo and finale, or as with many instrumental symphonies, it may use a different structure of movements. The written text in a choral symphony shares equal standing with the music, as in an oratorio, and the chorus and soloists share equality with the instruments. Over time the use of text allowed the choral symphony to evolve from an instrumental symphony with a choral finale, as in the Beethoven's Ninth, to a composition that can use voices and instruments throughout the entire composition, as in Stravinsky's Symphony of Psalms or Mahler's Eighth Symphony.

Sometimes the text can give a basic outline that correlates to the four-movement scheme of a symphony. For instance, the four-part structure of Edgar Allan Poe's The Bells, a progression from youth to marriage, maturity, and death, naturally suggested the four movements of a symphony to Sergei Rachmaninoff, which he followed in his choral symphony of the same name. The text can encourage a composer to expand a choral symphony past the normal bounds of the symphonic genre, as with Berlioz for his Roméo et Juliette, yet stay within the basic structural or aesthetic intent of symphonic form. It can also influence the musical content in parts where there is no singing, as in Roméo et Juliette. There, Berlioz allows the orchestra to express the majority of the drama in instrumental music and saves words for expository and narrative sections of the work.

== Relation of words and music ==
As in an oratorio, the written text in a choral symphony can be as important as the music, and the chorus and soloists can participate equally with the instruments in the exposition and development of musical ideas. The text can also help determine whether the composer follows symphonic form strictly, as in the case of Rachmaninoff, Britten and Shostakovich, or whether they expand symphonic form, as in the case of Berlioz, Mahler and Havergal Brian. Sometimes the choice of text has led the composer to different symphonic structures, as with Szymanowski, Schnittke and, again, Havergal Brian. The composer can also choose to treat the text fluidly, in a manner more like music than narrative. Such was the case with Vaughan Williams, Mahler and Philip Glass.

=== Musical treatment of text ===
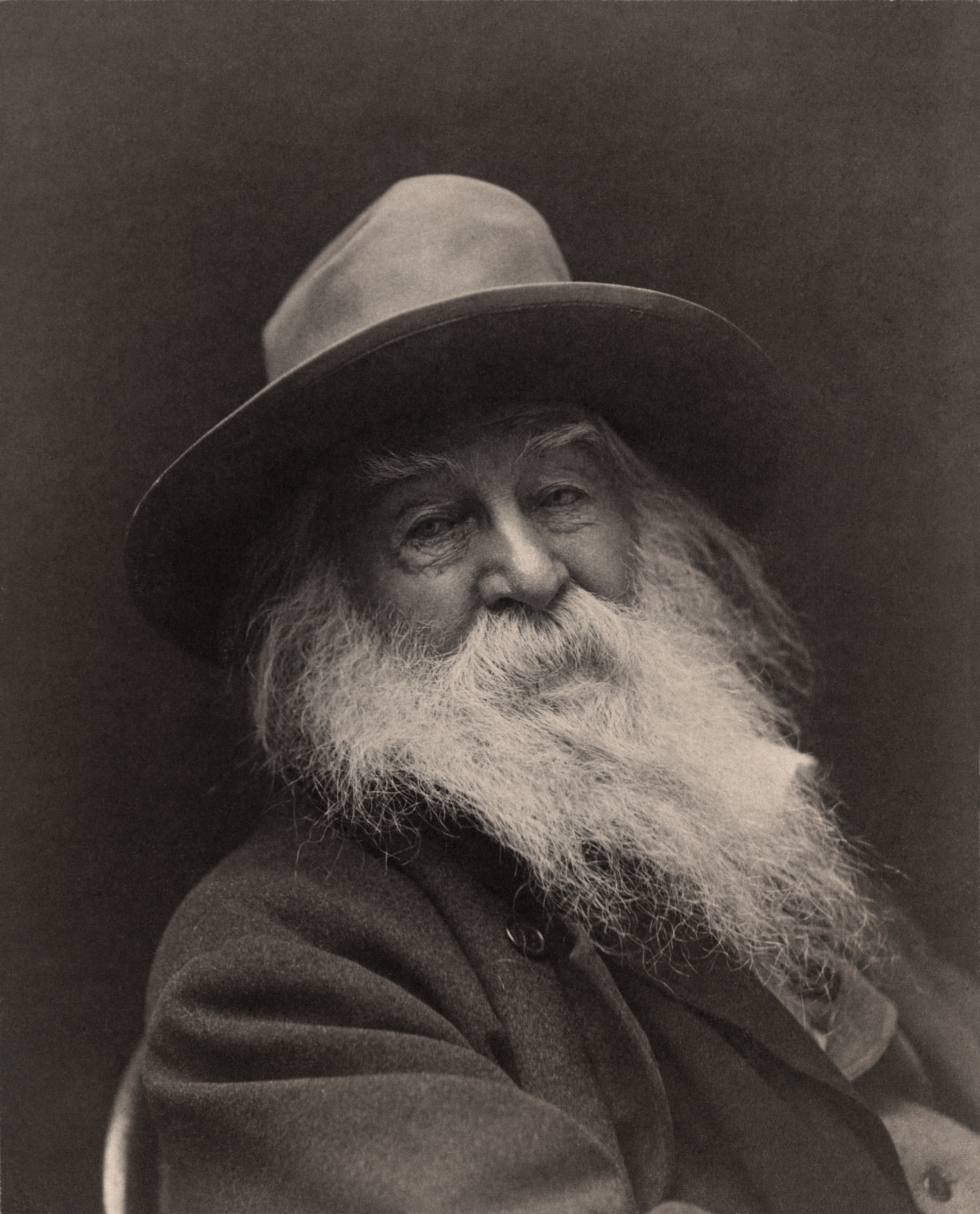
Walt Whitman's use of free verse became appreciated by composers seeking a more fluid approach to setting text.

Vaughan Williams' program note for A Sea Symphony discusses how the text was to be treated as music. The composer writes, "The plan of the work is symphonic rather than narrative or dramatic, and this may be held to justify the frequent repetition of important words and phrases which occur in the poem. The words as well as the music are thus treated symphonically." Walt Whitman's poems inspired him to write the symphony, and Whitman's use of free verse became appreciated at a time where fluidity of structure was becoming more attractive than traditional, metrical settings of text. This fluidity helped facilitate the non-narrative, symphonic treatment of text that Vaughan Williams had in mind. In the third movement in particular, the text is loosely descriptive and can be "pushed about by the music", some lines being repeated, some not consecutive in the written text immediately following one another in the music, and some left out entirely.

Vaughan Williams was not the only composer following a non-narrative approach to his text. Mahler took a similar, perhaps even more radical approach in his Eighth Symphony, presenting many lines of the first part, "Veni, Creator Spiritus", in what music writer and critic Michael Steinberg referred to as "an incredibly dense growth of repetitions, combinations, inversions, transpositions and conflations". He does the same with Goethe's text in Part Two of the symphony, making two substantial cuts and other changes.

Other works take the use of text as music still further. Vaughan Williams uses a chorus of women's voices wordlessly in his Sinfonia Antartica, based on his music for the film Scott of the Antarctic, to help set the bleakness of the overall atmosphere. While a chorus is used in the second and third movements of Glass's Seventh Symphony, also known as A Toltec Symphony, the text contains no actual words; the composer states that it is instead formed "from loose syllables that add to the evocative context of the overall orchestral texture".

=== Music and words as equals ===
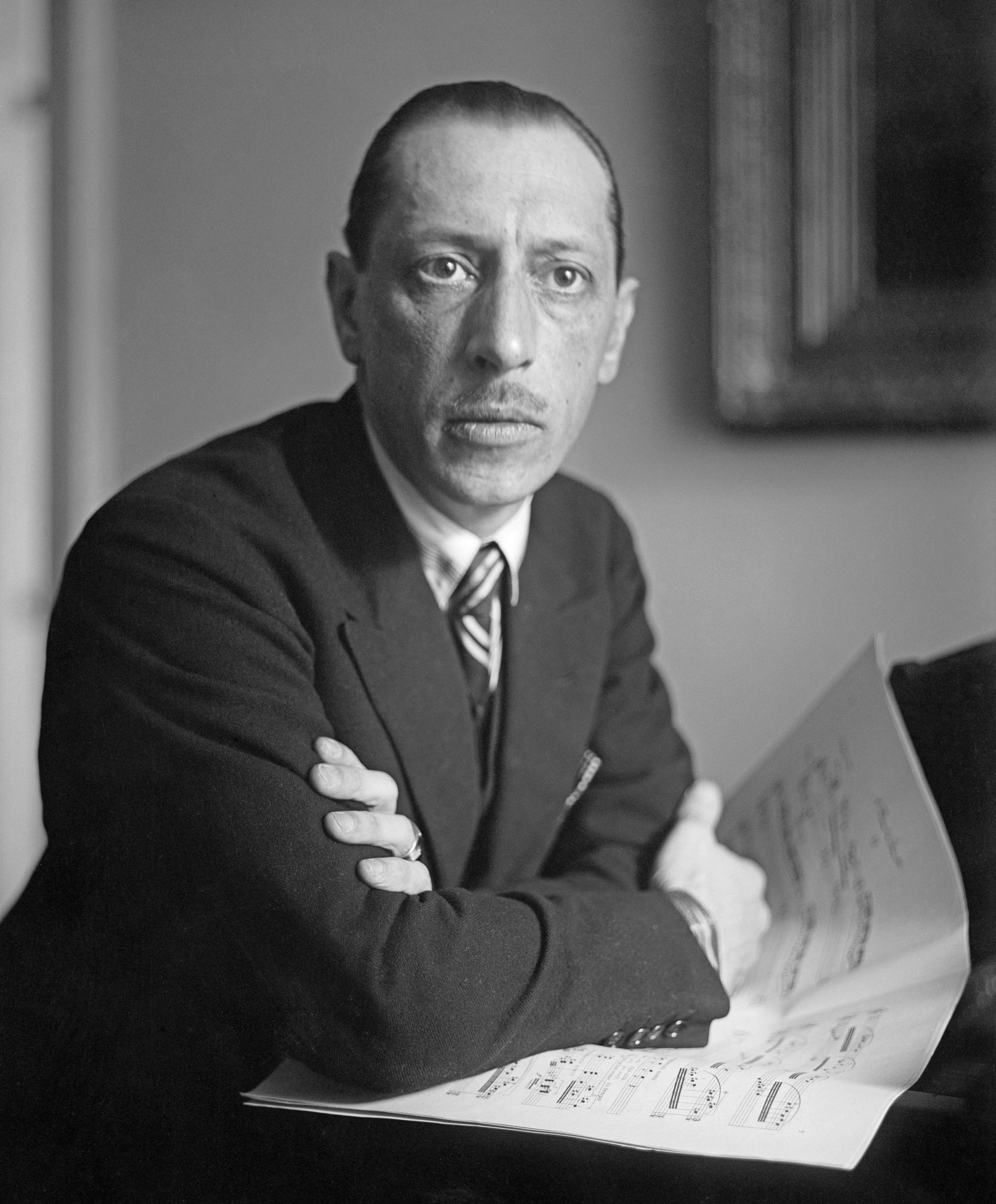
Igor Stravinsky used chorus and orchestra in his Symphony of Psalms "on an equal footing".

Stravinsky said about the texts of his Symphony of Psalms that "it is not a symphony in which I have included Psalms to be sung. On the contrary, it is the singing of the Psalms that I am symphonizing". This decision was as much musical as it was textual. Stravinsky's counterpoint required several musical voices to function simultaneously, independent melodically and rhythmically, yet interdependent harmonically. They would sound very different when heard separately, yet harmonious when heard together. To facilitate maximum clarity in this interplay of voices, Stravinsky used "a choral and instrumental ensemble in which the two elements should be on an equal footing, neither of them outweighing the other".

Mahler's intent in writing his Eighth Symphony for exceptionally large forces was a similar balance between vocal and instrumental forces. It was not simply an attempt at grandiose effect, though the composer's use of such forces earned the work the subtitle "Symphony of a Thousand" from his press agent (a name still applied to the symphony). Like Stravinsky, Mahler makes extensive and extended use of counterpoint, especially in the first part, "Veni Creator Spiritus". Throughout this section, according to music writer Michael Kennedy, Mahler displays considerable mastery in manipulating multiple independent melodic voices. Musicologist Deryck Cooke adds that Mahler handles his huge forces "with extraordinary clarity".

Vaughan Williams also insisted on a balance between words and music in A Sea Symphony, writing in his program note for the work, "It is also noticeable that the orchestra has an equal share with the chorus and soloists in carrying out the musical ideas". Music critic Samuel Langford, writing about the premiere of the work for The Manchester Guardian, concurred with the composer, writing, "It is the nearest approach we have to a real choral symphony, one in which the voices are used throughout just as freely as the orchestra."

In his Leaves of Grass: A Choral Symphony, Robert Strassburg composed a symphonic "musical setting" in ten movements for the poetry of Walt Whitman while balancing the contributions of a narrator, a chorus and an orchestra.

=== Words determining symphonic form ===
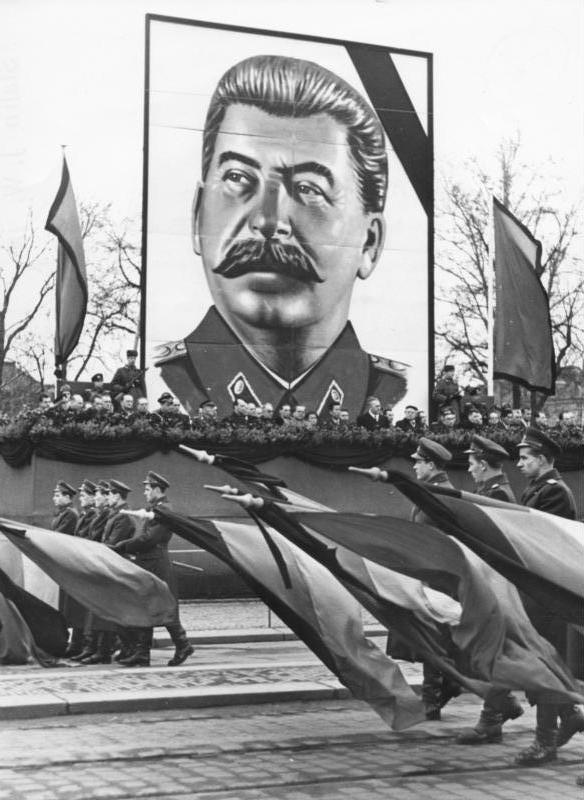
Yevtushenko's poems about the terror under Stalin (pictured) and other Soviet abuses inspired Shostakovich to write his Thirteenth Symphony

Rachmaninoff's choral symphony The Bells reflected the four-part progression from youth to marriage, maturity, and death in Poe's poem. Britten reversed the pattern for his Spring Symphony—the four sections of the symphony represent, in its composer's words, "the progress of Winter to Spring and the reawakening of the earth and life which that means.... It is in the traditional four movement shape of a symphony, but with the movements divided into shorter sections bound together by a similar mood or point of view."

The gestation of Shostakovich's Thirteenth Symphony, Babi Yar, was only slightly less straightforward. He set the poem Babi Yar by Yevgeny Yevtushenko almost immediately upon reading it, initially considering it a single-movement composition. Discovering three other Yevtushenko poems in the poet's collection Vzmakh ruki (A Wave of the Hand) prompted him to proceed to a full-length choral symphony, with "A Career" as the closing movement. Musicologist Francis Maes comments that Shostakovich did so by complementing Babi Yar's theme of Jewish suffering with Yevtushenko's verses about other Soviet abuses: "'At the Store' is a tribute to the women who have to stand in line for hours to buy the most basic foods,... 'Fears' evokes the terror under Stalin. 'A Career' is an attack on bureaucrats and a tribute to genuine creativity". Music historian Boris Schwarz adds that the poems, in the order Shostakovich places them, form a strongly dramatic opening movement, a scherzo, two slow movements and a finale.

In other cases, the choice of text has led the composer to different symphonic structures. Havergal Brian allowed the form of his Fourth Symphony, subtitled "Das Siegeslied" (Psalm of Victory), to be dictated by the three-part structure of his text, Psalm 68; the setting of Verses 13–18 for soprano solo and orchestra forms a quiet interlude between two wilder, highly chromatic martial ones set for massive choral and orchestral forces. Likewise, Szymanowski allowed the text by 13th-century Persian poet Rumi to dictate what Jim Samson calls the "single tripartite movement" and "overall arch structure" of his Third Symphony, subtitled "Song of the Night".

=== Words expanding symphonic form ===
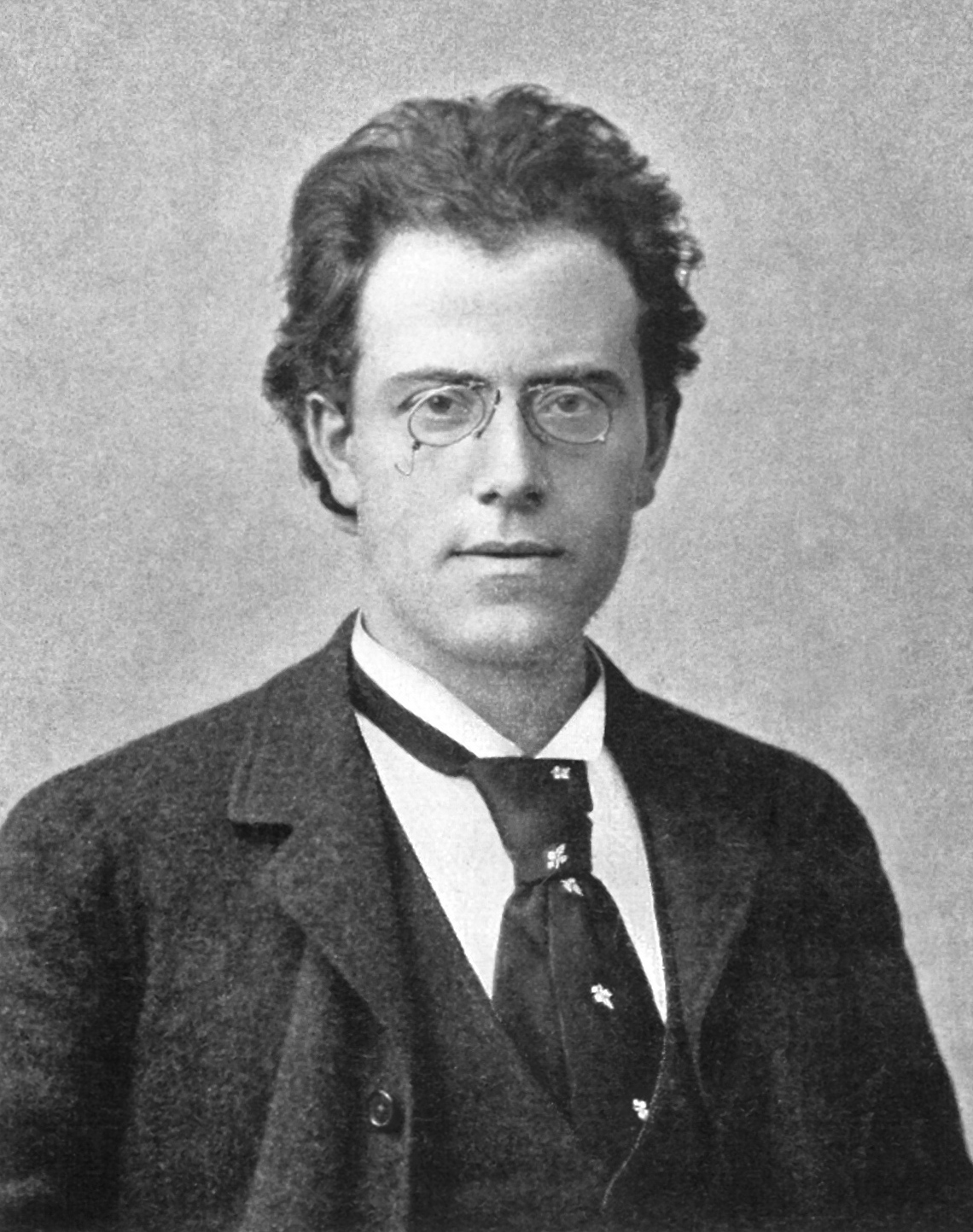
Mahler first expanded the model set by Beethoven's Ninth, then abandoned it.

A composer may also respond to a text by expanding a choral symphony beyond the normal bounds of the symphonic genre. This is evident in the unusual orchestration and stage directions Berlioz prepared for his Roméo et Juliette. This piece is actually in seven movements, and calls for an intermission after the fourth movement – the "Queen Mab Scherzo" – to remove the harps from the stage and bring on the chorus of Capulets for the funeral march that follows. Berlioz biographer D. Kern Holoman observed that, "as Berlioz saw it, the work is simply Beethovenian in design, with the narrative elements overlain. Its core approaches a five-movement symphony with the choral finale and, as in the [Symphonie] Fantastique, both a scherzo and a march.... The 'extra' movements are thus the introduction with its potpourri of subsections and the descriptive tomb scene [at the end of the work]."

Mahler expanded the Beethovenian model for programmatic as well as symphonic reasons in his Second Symphony, the "Resurrection", the vocal fourth movement, "Urlicht", bridging the childlike faith of the third movement with the ideological tension Mahler seeks to resolve in the finale. He then abandoned this pattern for his Third Symphony, as two movements for voices and orchestra follow three purely instrumental ones before the finale returns to instruments alone. Like Mahler, Havergal Brian expanded the Beethovenian model, but on a much larger scale and with far larger orchestral and choral forces, in his Symphony No. 1 "The Gothic". Written between 1919 and 1927, the symphony was inspired by Goethe's Faust and Gothic cathedral architecture. The Brian First is in two parts. The first consists of three instrumental movements; the second, also in three movements and over an hour in length, is a Latin setting of the Te Deum.

== Symphonies for unaccompanied chorus ==
A few composers have written symphonies for unaccompanied chorus, in which the choir performs both vocal and instrumental functions. Granville Bantock composed three such works—Atalanta in Calydon (1911), Vanity of Vanities (1913) and A Pageant of Human Life (1913). His Atalanta, called by musicologist Herbert Antcliffe "the most important [work of the three] alike in technical experiment and in inspiration", was written for a choir of at least 200, the composer specifying "'not less than 10 voices for each part,'" a work with 20 separate vocal parts. Using these forces, Bantock formed groups "of different weights and colors to get something of the varied play of tints and perspective [of an orchestra]". In addition, the choir is generally divided into three sections, approximating the timbres of woodwinds, brass and strings. Within these divisions, Antcliffe writes,

Almost every possible means of vocal expression is employed separately or in combination with others. To hear the different parts of the choir describing in word and tone "laughter" and "tears" respectively at the same time is to realize how little the possibilities of choral singing have as yet been grasped by the ordinary conductor and composer. Such combinations are extremely effective when properly achieved, but they are very difficult to achieve.

Roy Harris wrote his Symphony for Voices in 1935 for a cappella choir split into eight parts. Harris focused on harmony, rhythm and dynamics, allowing the text by Walt Whitman to dictate the choral writing. "In a real sense, the human strivings so vividly portrayed in Whitman's poetry find a musical analog to the trials to which the singers are subjected", John Profitt writes both of the music's difficulty for performers and of its highly evocative quality. Malcolm Williamson wrote his Symphony for Voices between 1960 and 1962, setting texts by Australian poet James McAuley. Lewis Mitchell writes that the work is not a symphony in any true sense, but rather a four-movement work preceded by an invocation for solo contralto. The text is a combination of poems celebrating the Australian wilderness and visionary Christianity, its jagged lines and rhythms matched by the music. Mitchell writes, "Of all his choral works, with the possible exception of the Requiem for a Tribe Brother, the Symphony is the most Australian in feeling".

== Programmatic intent ==
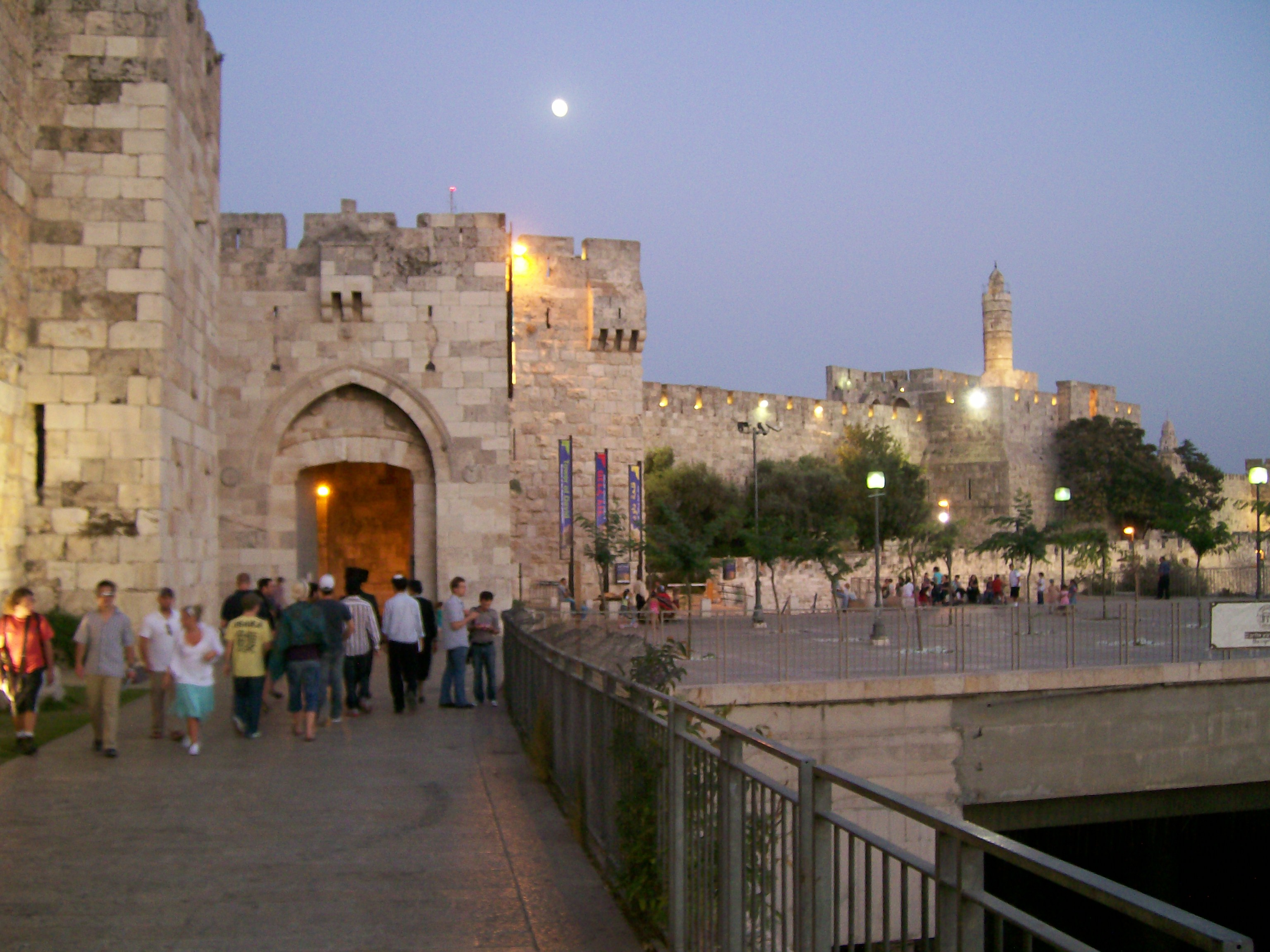
Jaffa Gate in Jerusalem. Penderecki's Seventh Symphony, subtitled "Seven Gates of Jerusalem", is "pervaded by the number 'seven' at various levels".

Some efforts from the end of the twentieth century paid less attention to symphonic form and more to programmatic intent. Hans Werner Henze wrote his 1997 Ninth Symphony in seven movements, basing the structure of the symphony on the novel The Seventh Cross by Anna Seghers. The novel recounts the flight of seven fugitives from a Nazi prison camp, the seven crosses symbolizing the seven death sentences; the ordeal of the one prisoner who makes it to freedom becomes the crux of the text. Penderecki's Seventh Symphony of 1996, subtitled "Seven Gates of Jerusalem" and originally conceived as an oratorio, is not only written in seven movements but, musicologist Richard Whitehouse writes, is "pervaded by the number 'seven' at various levels." An extensive system of seven-note phrases binds the work together, as well as the frequent use of seven notes repeated at a single pitch. Seven chords played fortissimo bring the work to a close.

Philip Glass's Fifth Symphony, completed in 1999 and subtitled "Requiem, Bardo and Nirmanakaya", is written in 12 movements to fulfill its programmatic intent. Glass writes, "My plan has been for the symphony to represent a broad spectrum of many of the world's great 'wisdom' traditions", synthesizing "a vocal text that begins before the world's creation, passes through earthly life and paradise, and closes with a future dedication". Glass writes that he considered the millennium at the beginning of the 21st century to be a symbolic bridge between past, present and spiritual rebirth.

More recently, Glass based the philosophical and musical structure for his Seventh Symphony (2005) on the Wirrarika sacred trinity. Glass wrote about the work's respective movement headings and their relation to the overall structure of the symphony, "'The Corn' represents a direct link between Mother Earth and the well-being of human beings.... 'The Sacred Root' is found in the high deserts of north and central Mexico, and is understood to be the doorway to the world of the Spirit. 'The Blue Deer' is considered the holder of the Book of Knowledge. Any man or woman who aspires to be a 'Person of Knowledge' will, through arduous training and effort, have to encounter the Blue Deer...."

=== Words changing programmatic intent ===
Addition of a text can effectively change the programmatic intent of a composition, as with the two choral symphonies of Franz Liszt. Both the Faust and Dante symphonies were conceived as purely instrumental works and only later became choral symphonies. However, while Liszt authority Humphrey Searle asserts that Liszt's later inclusion of a chorus effectively sums up Faust and makes it complete, another Liszt expert, Reeves Shulstad, suggests that Liszt changed the work's dramatic focus to the point of meriting a different interpretation of the work itself. According to Shulstad, "Liszt's original version of 1854 ended with a last fleeting reference to Gretchen and an ... orchestral peroration in C major, based on the most majestic of themes from the opening movement. One might say that this conclusion remains within the persona of Faust and his imagination". When Liszt rethought the piece three years later, he added a "Chorus mysticus", the male chorus singing the final words from Goethe's Faust. The tenor soloist, accompanied by the chorus, sings the last two lines of the text. "With the addition of the 'Chorus Mysticus' text", Shulstad writes, "the Gretchen theme has been transformed and she no longer appears as a masked Faust. With this direct association to the final scene of the drama we have escaped Faust's imaginings and are hearing another voice commenting on his striving and redemption".

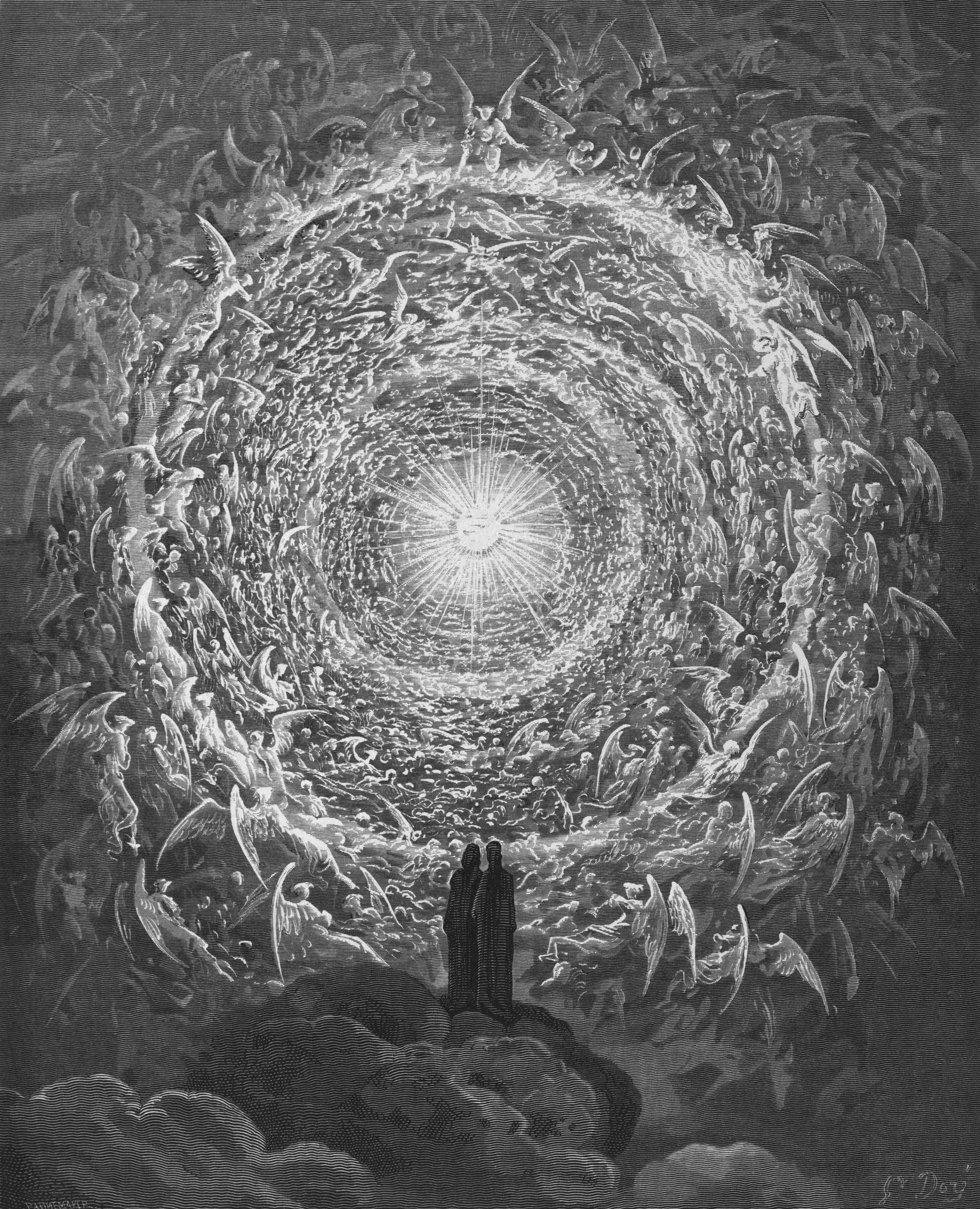
From Paradiso Canto 31 by Dante Alighieri. Illustration by Gustave Doré. Dante's hearing the music of Heaven from afar.

Likewise, Liszt's inclusion of a choral finale in his Dante Symphony changed both the structural and programmatic intent of the work. Liszt's intent was to follow the structure of the Divine Comedy and compose Dante in three movements—one each for the Inferno, Purgatorio and Paradiso. However, Liszt's son-in-law Richard Wagner persuaded him that no earthly composer could faithfully express the joys of Paradise. Liszt dropped the third movement but added a choral element, a Magnificat, at the end of the second. This action, Searle claims, effectively destroyed the work's formal balance and left the listener, like Dante, to gaze upward at the heights of Heaven and hear its music from afar. Shulstad suggests that the choral finale actually helps complete the work's programmatic trajectory from struggle to paradise.

Conversely, a text can also spark the birth of a choral symphony, only for that work to become a purely instrumental one when the programmatic focus of the work changes. Shostakovich originally planned his Seventh Symphony as a single-movement choral symphony much like his Second and Third Symphonies. Shostakovich reportedly intended to set a text for the Seventh from the Ninth Psalm, on the theme of vengeance for the shedding of innocent blood. In doing this he was influenced by Stravinsky; he had been deeply impressed with the latter's Symphony of Psalms, which he wanted to emulate in this work. While the Ninth Psalm's theme conveyed Shostakovich's outrage over Stalin's oppression, a public performance of a work with such a text would have been impossible before the German invasion. Hitler's aggression made the performance of such a work feasible, at least in theory; the reference to "blood" could then be associated at least officially with Hitler. With Stalin appealing to the Soviets' patriotic and religious sentiments, the authorities were no longer suppressing Orthodox themes or images. Nevertheless, Shostakovich eventually realized that the work encompassed far more than this symbology. He expanded the symphony to the traditional four movements and made it purely instrumental.

=== Supplanting text wordlessly ===
While Berlioz allowed the programmatic aspects of his text to shape the symphonic form of Roméo and to guide its content, he also showed how an orchestra could supplant such a text wordlessly to further illustrate it. He wrote in his preface to Roméo:

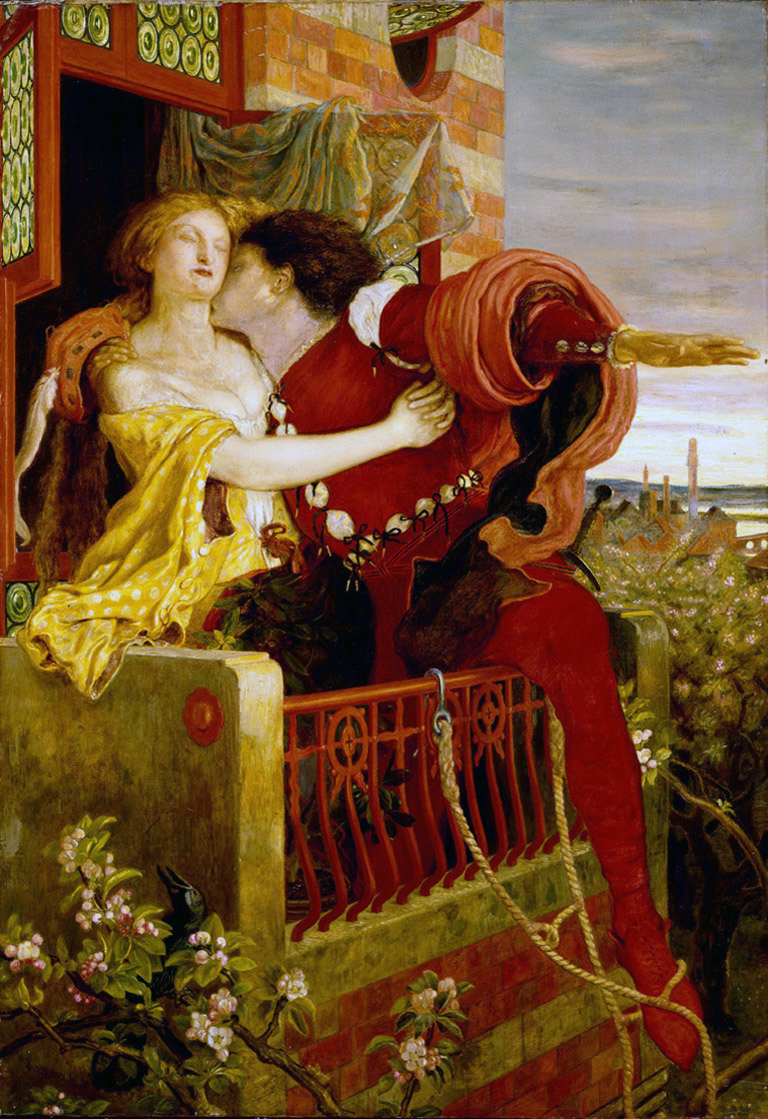
Berlioz allowed text to dictate symphonic form in Roméo but allowed the music to supplant the text wordlessly.

If, in the famous garden and cemetery scenes the dialogue of the two lovers, Juliet's asides, and Romeo's passionate outbursts are not sung, if the duets of love and despair are given to the orchestra, the reasons are numerous and easy to comprehend. First, and this alone would be sufficient, it is a symphony and not an opera. Second, since duets of this nature have been handled vocally a thousand times by the greatest masters, it was wise as well as unusual to attempt another means of expression. It is also because the very sublimity of this love made its depiction so dangerous for the musician that he had to give his imagination a latitude that the positive sense of the sung words would not have given him, resorting instead to instrumental language, which is richer, more varied, less precise, and by its very indefiniteness incomparably more powerful in such a case.

As a manifesto, this paragraph became significant for the amalgamation of symphonic and dramatic elements in the same musical composition. Musicologist Hugh Macdonald writes that as Berlioz kept the idea of symphonic construction closely in mind, he allowed the orchestra to express the majority of the drama in instrumental music and set expository and narrative sections in words. Fellow musicologist Nicholas Temperley suggests that, in Roméo, Berlioz created a model for how a dramatic text could guide the structure of a choral symphony without circumventing that work from being recognizably a symphony. In this sense, musicologist Mark Evans Bonds writes, the symphonies of Liszt and Mahler owe a debt of influence to Berlioz.

More recently, Alfred Schnittke allowed the programmatic aspects of his texts to dictate the course of both his choral symphonies even when no words were being sung. Schnittke's six-movement Second Symphony, following the Ordinary of the Mass of the Roman Catholic Church, works programmatically on two levels simultaneously. While soloists and chorus briefly perform the mass, set to chorales taken from the Gradual, the orchestra provides an extended running commentary that can continue much longer than the section of the mass being performed. Sometimes the commentary follows a particular chorale but more often is freer and wider ranging in style. Despite the resulting stylistic disparity, biographer Alexander Ivashkin comments, "musically almost all these sections blend the choral [sic] tune and subsequent extensive orchestral 'commentary.'" The work becomes what Schnittke called an "Invisible Mass", and Alexander Ivashkin termed "a symphony against a chorale backdrop".

The program in Schnittke's Fourth Symphony, reflecting the composer's own religious dilemma at the time it was written, is more complex in execution, with the majority of it expressed wordlessly. In the 22 variations that make up the symphony's single movement, (Note: The actual number of variations in the Schnittke Fourth Symphony is "a subtle non-synchronicity" of the piece, considering the "3 by 5 scheme" of the Rosary these variations are reportedly based on.) Schnittke enacts the 15 traditional Mysteries of the Rosary, which highlight important moments in the life of Christ. As he did in the Second Symphony, Schnittke simultaneously gives a detailed musical commentary on what is being portrayed. Schnittke does this while using church music from the Catholic, Protestant, Jewish and Orthodox faiths, the orchestral texture becoming extremely dense from the many musical strands progressing at the same time. A tenor and a countertenor also sing wordlessly at two points in the symphony. The composition saves words for a finale that uses all four types of church music contrapuntally as a four-part choir sings the Ave Maria. The choir can choose whether to sing the Ave Maria in Russian or Latin. The programmatic intent of using these different types of music, Ivashkin writes, is an insistence by the composer "on the idea ... of the unity of humanity, a synthesis and harmony among various manifestations of belief".

== See also ==
- List of choral symphonies
