= Choral Symphony (Holst) =

Composition by Gustav Holst

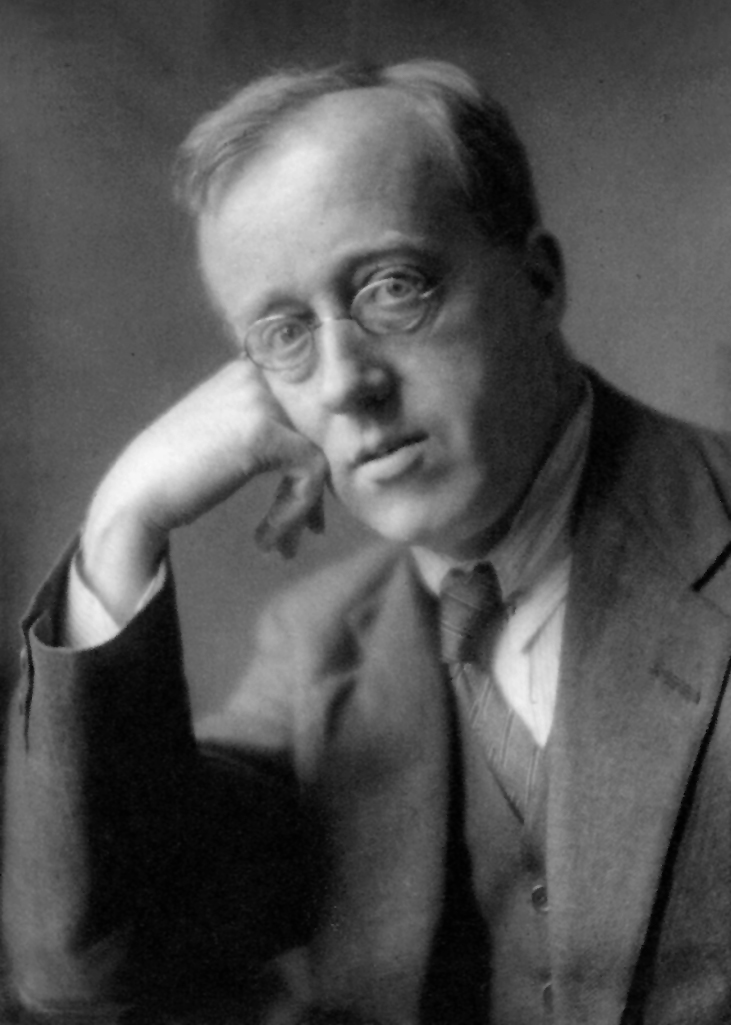
Gustav Holst ca. 1921

The Choral Symphony is a work by Gustav Holst for soprano soloist, chorus, and orchestra in a setting of verses by John Keats. Written in 1923–24, it was premiered in Leeds Town Hall on October 7, 1925, conducted by Albert Coates with Dorothy Silk as soloist. The same performers gave the work's second performance three weeks later in Queen's Hall, London. The work is sometimes known as the First Choral Symphony, although a planned 'second Choral Symphony' never progressed beyond some uncompleted sketches.

== Structure ==
The symphony is written in a traditional four-movement structure; nevertheless, the setting of the Ode on a Grecian Urn and the Scherzo can also be performed separately.

- Prelude: Invocation to Pan "O Thou, whose mighty palace roof doth hang"
- Movement 1
  - Part 1. Song and Bacchanal: Beneath my palm tree, by the river side ("Song of the Indian Maid")
  - Part 2. Chorus: Whence came ye, merry Damsels, whence came ye?
  - Part 3. Solo: Within his car, aloft, young Bacchus stood
  - Part 4. Chorus: Whence came ye, jolly Satyrs, whence came ye?
  - Part 5. Solo: Onward the tiger and the leopard pants
  - Part 6. Chorus: Bacchus, young Bacchus! good or ill betide
- Movement 2.
  - Chorus: Ode on a Grecian Urn "Thou still unravish'd bride of quietness"
- Movement 3
  - Part 1. Scherzo "Fancy" Chorus: Ever let the fancy roam ("Fancy")
  - Part 2. Folly's Song: When wedding fiddles are a-playing (Extracts from an Opera, FOLLY'S SONG)
- Movement 4
  - Part 1. Solo: Spirit here that reignest!
  - Part 2. Chorus: God of the golden bow
  - Part 3. Solo: Then, through thy Temple wide, melodious swells
  - Part 4. Chorus: 'Tis awful silence then again
  - Part 5. Solo: Next thy Tasso's ardent numbers
  - Part 6. Chorus: But when Thou joinest with the Nine
  - Part 7. Solo: Spirit here that reignest!

== Overview ==
=== Composition ===
By 1923, Holst enjoyed a substantial reputation as a choral composer. That year he was chosen by the organizers of the 1925 Leeds Triennial Festival to write a new work for that event. Holst accepted the commission. Turning to the poetry of John Keats for his text, Holst set various unrelated passages that stimulated his musical imagination. For the introduction and first movement he chose stanzas from the chorus of shepherds in Endymion and from the Roundelay in Book IV of the poem. The second movement became a setting of the Ode on a Grecian Urn. The Scherzo uses much of "Fancy and Folly's Song" a short piece published in Extracts from an Opera. For the finale Holst chose the lines "Spirit here that reignest" which the poet had written in a copy of Beaumont and Fletcher's plays; this was followed by extracts from the Hymn to Apollo, most of the Ode to Apollo and the ode Bards of Passion and of Mirth. The work thus became a four-movement choral symphony, with the vocal parts fully integrated in the overall musical texture instead of being added to the orchestra as an extra element.

=== Reception ===
Though it seems that the Leeds premiere was well-received, the London performance had a poor effect, due largely to an inadequate rehearsal of a demanding piece. The work never recovered from that disastrous outing, and there were plenty of pundits prepared to pour scorn on the work. Literary purists were offended by the juxtaposition of unrelated elements from Keats' poems. Music critics scorned the work, accusing Holst of not pouring enough debauchery into the Bacchanale. Singers found the work difficult. Audiences showed little enthusiasm. Even Holst's friend, composer Ralph Vaughan Williams, admitted that he felt only a "cold admiration" for it. After the initial performances the symphony fell into neglect. From this point Holst's popularity as a composer waned.

=== Planned second Choral Symphony ===
Holst began planning a 'second Choral Symphony', based on poems by George Meredith, but only made some initial fragmentary sketches. These sketches are now located at the British Museum in London.

== Bibliography ==
- Holst, Imogen, ed. Stanley Sadie, "Holst, Gustav(us Theodore von)," New Grove Dictionary of Music and Musicians, 20 vols. London: Macmillan, 1980. ISBN 0-333-23111-2.
- Holst, Imogen. The music of Gustav Holst (3rd revised ed.), printed with Holst's music reconsidered. Oxford University Press, 1986 ISBN 9780193154582
- Mitchell, Jon C. A Comprehensive Biography of Composer Gustav Holst with Correspondence and Diary Excerpts Including his American Years Lewiston: Edwin Mellen Press, 2001. ISBN 0-7734-7522-2.
- Short, Michael, Notes for Hyperion CDA66660, Holst: Choral Symphony; Choral Fantasia Hyperion Records Limited, London, 1993.
