= Lobgesang =

Choral symphony by Felix Mendelssohn

- Choral symphony by Felix Mendelssohn
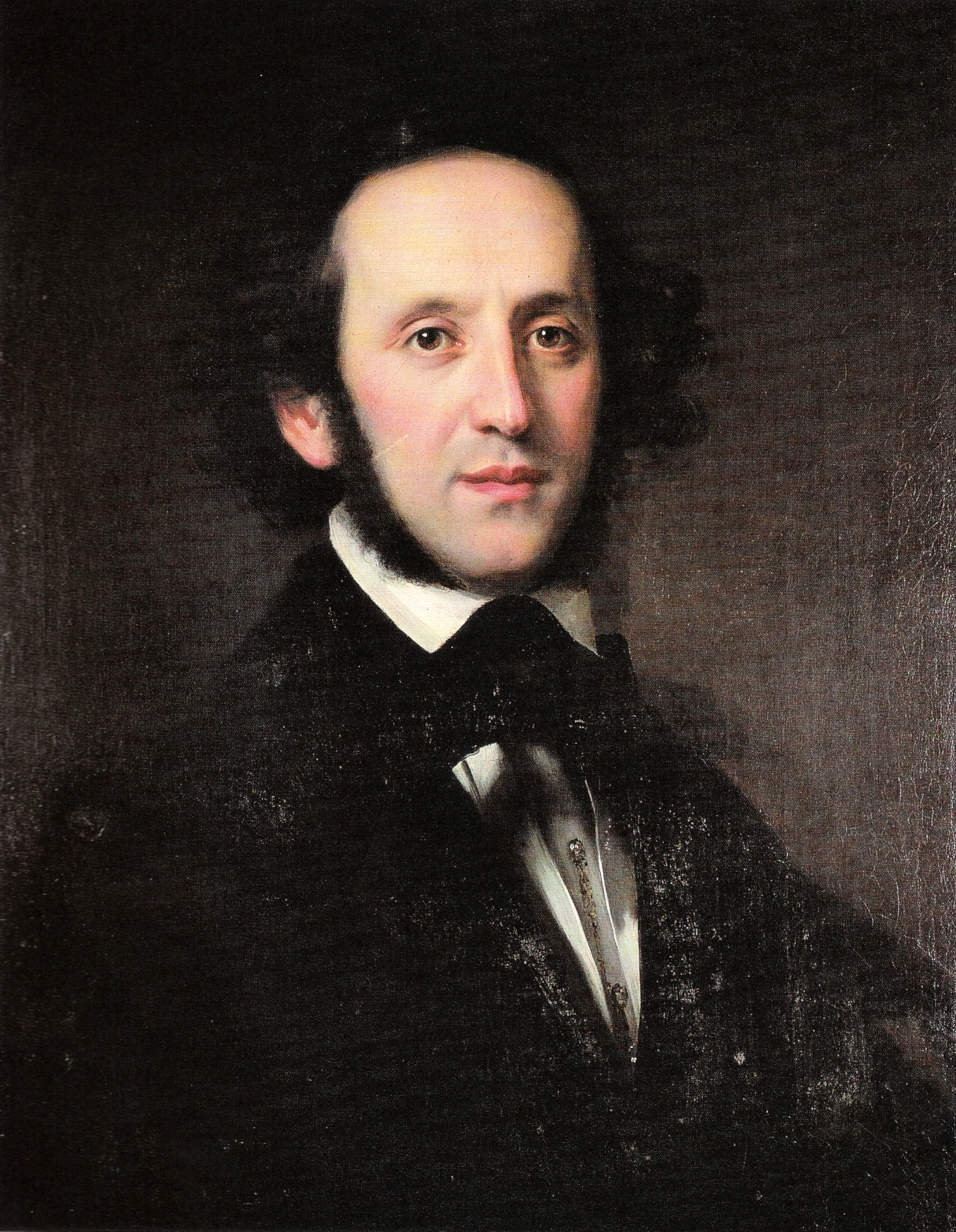
- Mendelssohn in 1846
- English: Hymn of Praise
- Other name: Symphony No. 2
- Key: B♭ major
- Catalogue: MWV A 18
- Opus: 52
- Occasion: 400th anniversary of printing
- Text: Psalms, other biblical verses, "Nun danket alle Gott"
- Language: German
- Composed: 1840
- Performed: 25 June 1840
- Movements: 10
- Scoring: 2 sopranos; tenor; choir; organ; orchestra

External audio
- You may hear Mendelssohn's Symphony No. 2 in B-flat major, Op. 52 Hymn of Praise performed by the Gewandhaus Orchestra led by Kurt Masur in 1990; Here on Archive.org

Lobgesang (Hymn of Praise), Op. 52 (MWV A 18), is an 11-movement "Symphony-Cantata on Words of the Holy Bible for Soloists, Choir and Orchestra" by Felix Mendelssohn. After the composer's death it was published as his Symphony No. 2 in B♭ major, a naming and a numbering that are not his. The required soloists are two sopranos and a tenor. The work lasts almost twice as long as any of Mendelssohn's purely instrumental symphonies.

== History ==
It was composed in 1840, along with the less-known Festgesang "Gutenberg Cantata", to celebrate the 400th anniversary of the invention of Johannes Gutenberg's movable type printing system.

In 1842 Mendelssohn had published his Scottish Symphony as "Symphony No. 3", however a "Symphony No. 2" had never been published during Mendelssohn's lifetime. Possibly the composer's intention was to spare this number for his earlier Italian Symphony, which he premiered in 1833, but afterwards withheld for a revision that was never completed. The Italian Symphony was published posthumously as "Symphony No. 4". Decades after Mendelssohn's death, the editors of the old Mendelssohn complete edition entered Lobgesang as "No. 2" in the sequence of the symphonies for editorial reasons. However, there is no indication that this represented the composer's intentions. The new Mendelssohn-Werkverzeichnis (MWV), published in 2009 by the Saxon Academy of Sciences and Humanities, no longer lists Lobgesang among the symphonies, but rather among the sacred vocal works.

== Structure ==
Structurally, it consists of three purely orchestral movements followed by 10 movements for chorus and/or soloists and orchestra, and lasts approximately 65–75 minutes in total. The English titles of the movements are:

1. Sinfonia:
  1. Maestoso con moto - Allegro
  2. Allegretto un poco agitato
  3. Adagio religioso
2. All men, all things, all that have life and breath (chorus)
3. Let everything that has breath praise the Lord (soprano and semi-chorus) (Note: This is sometimes printed as Movement 2½)
4. Sing ye Praise (tenor recitative and aria)
5. All ye that cried unto the Lord (chorus)
6. I waited for the Lord (soprano duet and chorus)
7. The sorrows of Death (tenor Aria)
8. The Night is Departing (chorus)
9. Let all men praise the Lord (chorale, "Nun danket alle Gott")
10. My song shall be always Thy Mercy (soprano and tenor duet)
11. Ye nations, offer to the Lord (chorus)

The now-standard harmonisation of "Nun danket alle Gott" by Martin Rinkart (1636) was devised by Felix Mendelssohn in 1840 when he adopted the hymn, sung in the now-standard key of G major and with its original German lyrics of stanzas 1 and three, as the chorale to Lobgesang.

== Instrumentation ==
The symphony is scored for two sopranos, tenor, chorus, two flutes, two oboes, two clarinets, two bassoons, four horns, two trumpets, three trombones, timpani, organ and strings.

== Text ==
1. Sinfonia

2. Chor und Sopran

Alles, was Odem hat, lobe den Herrn. (Psalm 150)

Lobt den Herrn mit Saitenspiel, lobt ihn mit eurem Lied. (Psalm 33)

Und alles Fleisch lobe seinen heiligen Namen. (Psalm 145)

Lobe den Herrn, meine Seele, und was in mir ist, seinen heiligen Namen.
Lobe den Herrn, meine Seele, und vergiß es nicht, was er dir Gutes getan. (Psalm 103)

3. Rezitativ und Arie

Saget es, die ihr erlöst seid durch den Herrn,
die er aus der Not errettet hat,
aus schwerer Trübsal, aus Schmach und Banden,
die ihr gefangen im Dunkel waret,
alle, die er erlöst hat aus der Not.
Saget es! Danket ihm und rühmet seine Güte! (Psalm 107)

Er zählet unsere Tränen in der Zeit der Not.
Er tröstet die Betrübten mit seinem Wort. (Psalm 56)

Saget es! Danket ihm und rühmet seine Güte.

4. Chor

Saget es, die ihr erlöset seid von dem Herrn aus aller Trübsal.
Er zählet unsere Tränen in der Zeit der Not.

5. Duett und Chor

Ich harrete des Herrn, und er neigte sich zu mir und hörte mein Flehn.
Wohl dem, der seine Hoffnung setzt auf den Herrn!
Wohl dem, der seine Hoffnung setzt auf ihn! (Psalm 40)

6. Tenor und Sopran

Stricke des Todes hatten uns umfangen,
und Angst der Hölle hatte uns getroffen,
wir wandelten in Finsternis. (Psalm 116)

Er aber spricht: Wache auf! Wache auf, der du schläfst,
stehe auf von den Toten, ich will dich erleuchten! (Ephesians 5:14)

Wir riefen in der Finsternis: Hüter, ist die Nacht bald hin?
Der Hüter aber sprach:
Wenn der Morgen schon kommt, so wird es doch Nacht sein;
wenn ihr schon fraget, so werdet ihr doch wiederkommen
und wieder fragen: Hüter, ist die Nacht bald hin? (Isaiah 21:11–12)

7. Chor

Die Nacht ist vergangen, der Tag aber herbei gekommen.
So laßt uns ablegen die Werke der Finsternis,
und anlegen die Waffen des Lichts,
und ergreifen die Waffen des Lichts. (Romans 13:12)

8. Choral

Nun danket alle Gott mit Herzen, Mund und Händen,
der sich in aller Not will gnädig zu uns wenden,
der so viel Gutes tut, von Kindesbeinen an
uns hielt in seiner Hut und allen wohlgetan.

Lob Ehr und Preis sei Gott, dem Vater und dem Sohne,
und seinem heilgen Geist im höchsten Himmelsthrone.
Lob dem dreiein'gen Gott, der Nacht und Dunkel schied
von Licht und Morgenrot, ihm danket unser Lied.

9. [Duett]

Drum sing ich mit meinem Liede ewig dein Lob, du treuer Gott!
Und danke dir für alles Gute, das du an mir getan.
Und wandl' ich in der Nacht und tiefem Dunkel
und die Feinde umher stellen mir nach,
so rufe ich an den Namen des Herrn,
und er errettet mich nach seiner Güte.

10. Chor

Ihr Völker! bringet her dem Herrn Ehre und Macht!
Ihr Könige! bringet her dem Herrn Ehre und Macht!
Der Himmel bringe her dem Herrn Ehre und Macht!
Die Erde bringe her dem Herrn Ehre und Macht! (Psalm 96)

Alles danke dem Herrn!
Danket dem Herrn und rühmt seinen Namen
und preiset seine Herrlichkeit. (I Chronicles 16:8–10)

Alles, was Odem hat, lobe den Herrn, Halleluja! (Psalm 150)

1. Sinfonia

2. Chorus and soprano

Everything that has breath praise the Lord. (Psalm 150)

Praise the Lord with the lyre, praise him with your song. (Psalm 33)

And let all flesh bless his holy name. (Psalm 145)

Bless the Lord, O my soul, and that is within me, bless his holy name.
Bless the Lord, O my soul, and forget not that he has done you good. (Psalm 103)

3. Recitative and aria

Say it that you are redeemed by the Lord,
he has delivered them out of trouble,
of severe tribulation, from shame and bondage
captives in the darkness,
all which he hath redeemed from distress
Say it! Give thanks to him and praise ye, His goodness! (Psalm 107)

He numbers our tears in our time of need,
he comforts the afflicted with his word. (Psalm 56)

Say it! Give thanks to him and praise ye his kindness.

4. Chorus

Say it that you are redeemed by the Lord out of all tribulation.
He numbers our tears in our time of need.

5. Duet and Chorus

I waited patiently for the Lord, and He inclined to me and heard my supplication. (Psalm 40:1)
Blessed is the man whose hope is in the Lord! (Psalm 40:4)
Blessed is the man whose hope is in him!

6. Tenor und Sopran

The sorrows of death encompassed us
and fear of hell had struck us,
We wandered in darkness. (Psalm 116)

He saith, Awake! you who sleep,
arise from the dead, I will enlighten you! (Ephesians 5:14)

We called in the darkness, Watchman, will the night soon pass?
But the Watchman said:
if the morning comes soon, it will yet again be night;
and if you ask, you will return
and ask again, Watchman, will the night soon pass? (Isaiah 21:11–12)

7. Chor

The night has passed, but the day has come.
So let us cast off the works of darkness,
and put on the armor of light,
and take up the armor of light. (Romans 13:12)

8. Chorale

Now let us all thank God with hearts and hands and voices,
who in all adversity will be merciful to us,
who does so much good, who from childhood
has kept us in his care and done good to all.

Praise, honor and glory be to God the Father, and the Son,
and his Holy Spirit on heaven's highest throne.
Praise to God, three in one, who separated night and darkness
from light and dawn, give thanks to him with our song.

9. [Duet]

So I sing your praises with my song forever, faithful God!
And thank you for all the good you have done to me.
Though I wander in night and deep darkness
and enemies beset me all around
I will call upon the name of the Lord,
and he saved me by His goodness.

10. Chorus

You peoples! give unto the Lord glory and strength!
You kings! give unto the Lord glory and strength!
The sky will bring forth the Lord glory and strength!
Let the earth bring forth the Lord glory and strength! (Psalm 96)

All thanks to the Lord!
Praise the Lord and exalt his name
and praise his glory. (I Chronicles 16:8–10)

Everything that has breath praise the Lord, Hallelujah! (Psalm 150)

== See also ==
- Sinfonia#Symphony with an alternative scope
- Lobgesang (Op. 76) (for SATB chorus and glockenspiel) by Henryk Górecki.
