= Blanc Wan =

Blanc Chun Pong Wan BEM FRSA (Chinese: 尹俊邦) is a Hong Kong born classical pianist and music educator. He is the Immediate Past President of The Oxford and Cambridge Society of Hong Kong, an Examiner of the HKSAR Government's Hong Kong Art Development Council, a Member of the HKSAR Government's Youth Development Commission, and was a Governor of the Royal Northern College of Music from 2014–2017.

== Biography ==
Wan graduated from the University of Oxford, and received his Doctor of Philosophy degree from King's College London. He was elected as a Young Steinway Artist in 2011, and Steinway Honorary Teacher in 2021.

Wan has broadcast on radio network RTHK and other overseas services, and has given recitals throughout Europe and Asia. As the former Editor-in-Chief of The Pianist magazine, he has published interviews with some of the world's pianists. He has been invited on the juries of many piano competitions including the Steinway International Piano Competition, Hong Kong International Piano Open Competition, as well as Asia Pacific Youth Piano Competition.

He was awarded a British Empire Medal (BEM) in the His Majesty The King's 2026 New Year Honours for services to UK Higher Education and Music Culture in Hong Kong.

== Publications ==
- "What is Practice? Am I practicing?" The Pianist Magazine No. 1 (Hong Kong: 2012), 25–26.
- "Performance Preparation" The Pianist Magazine No. 2 (Hong Kong: 2012), 14–17.
- "Performing from Memory" The Pianist Magazine No. 3 (Hong Kong: 2012), 30–33.
- "Does Piano Examination suit you or your pupil?" The Pianist Magazine No. 4 (Hong Kong: 2012), 22–23.
- "Movement and Gestures" The Pianist Magazine No. 5 (Hong Kong: 2013), 22–23.
- "Hand Position & Legato Playing" The Pianist Magazine No. 6 (Hong Kong: 2013), 20–23.
- "Piano Fingering" The Pianist Magazine No. 7 (Hong Kong: 2013), 20–23.
- "The Mind and The Body – Stage Presence of a Concert Pianist" The Pianist Magazine No. 8 (Hong Kong: 2013), 14–15.
- "Performing with Black and White: The Conception of Right or Wrong" The Pianist Magazine No. 9 (Hong Kong: 2014), 24–25.
- "Playing Octaves" The Pianist Magazine No. 10 (Hong Kong: 2014), 19–21.
- "Music Training: Quantity and Quality" The Pianist Magazine No. 11 (Hong Kong: 2014), 8–9.
- "Acton of the Wrist" The Pianist Magazine No. 12 (Hong Kong: 2014), 15–17.
- "Training the weak fingers" The Pianist Magazine No. 13 (Hong Kong: 2015), 14–17.
