= Symphony No. 2 (Schnittke) =

Symphony by Alfred Schnittke

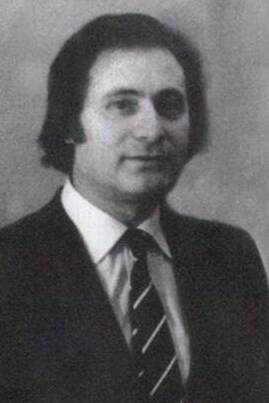
Alfred Schnittke

Russian composer Alfred Schnittke wrote his Symphony No. 2, subtitled "St. Florian" and "Invisible Mass" in 1979. It is a choral symphony, written for contralto, countertenor, tenor and bass, plus chorus and orchestra. The symphony was written in homage to 19th century Austrian composer and organist Anton Bruckner, who was closely associated with St. Florian's Priory in the town of Sankt Florian, Upper Austria, and who is buried under the organ there.

== Music ==
The symphony is written in six movements, structured after the Ordinary of the Mass of the Roman Catholic Church, and lasts approximately 60 minutes.

1. Kyrie
2. Gloria
3. Credo
4. Crucifixus
5. Sanctus—Benedictus
6. Agnus Dei

Schnittke biographer Alexander Ivashkin writes, "The Symphony is written for a large orchestra consisting of double the standard number of woodwinds, 4 French horns, 4 trumpets, 4 trombones, 1 tuba, an extensive range of percussion instruments, piano, harpsichord, organ, celesta, 2 harps, an electric guitar and a bass guitar. The mixed chorus is a chamber one, including four soloists of each voice."

== Overview ==
In 1977, Schnittke visited the West as a harpsichordist with the Lithuanian Chamber Orchestra. During this trip, he visited St. Florian's Monastery near Linz, where Bruckner had played the organ and was buried. Ivashkin writes, "Entering the cloister in the twilight [Schnittke] heard the sound of monks singing an evening 'invisible' mass. This made a vivid impression on him. Two years later when Gennady Rozhdestvensky commissioned a work from Schnittke for the BBC Symphony Orchestra, the composer was to write his Second Symphony or Invisible Mass."

Compared to the extroverted polystylism of the First Symphony, the Second displays a more "thoroughgoing absorption of [its] diverse musical sources." The symphony works on two levels almost simultaneously. While soloists and a choir perform the mass, set to chorales taken from the Gradual, the orchestra provides a running commentary that sometimes follows a particular chorale but more often is "rather free and extensive" in style. "Yet musically almost all these sections blend the choral [sic] tune and subsequent extensive orchestral 'commentary.'" The work becomes what Schnittke called an "Invisible Mass," something Alexander Ivashkin termed "a symphony against a chorale backdrop."

== Bibliography ==
- Ivashkin, Alexander, Alfred Schnittke (London: Phaidon Press Limited, 1996). ISBN 0-7148-3169-7.
- Ivashkin, Alexander, notes to Chandos 9519, Schnittke: Symphony No. 2, "St. Florian"; Marina Katsman, contralto; Yaroslav Zdorov, countertenor; Oleg Dorgov, tenor; Sergei Veprintsev, bass; Russian State Symphonic Capella and Russian State Symphony Orchestra conducted by Valery Polyansky (Colchester: Chandos Records Ltd., 1997).
- Sadie, Stanley (ed.). The New Grove Dictionary of Music and Musicians, Second Expanded Edition, 29 vols. London: Macmillan, 2001. ISBN 0-333-60800-3.
