= Symphony No. 7 (Glass) =

2005 symphony composed by Philip Glass

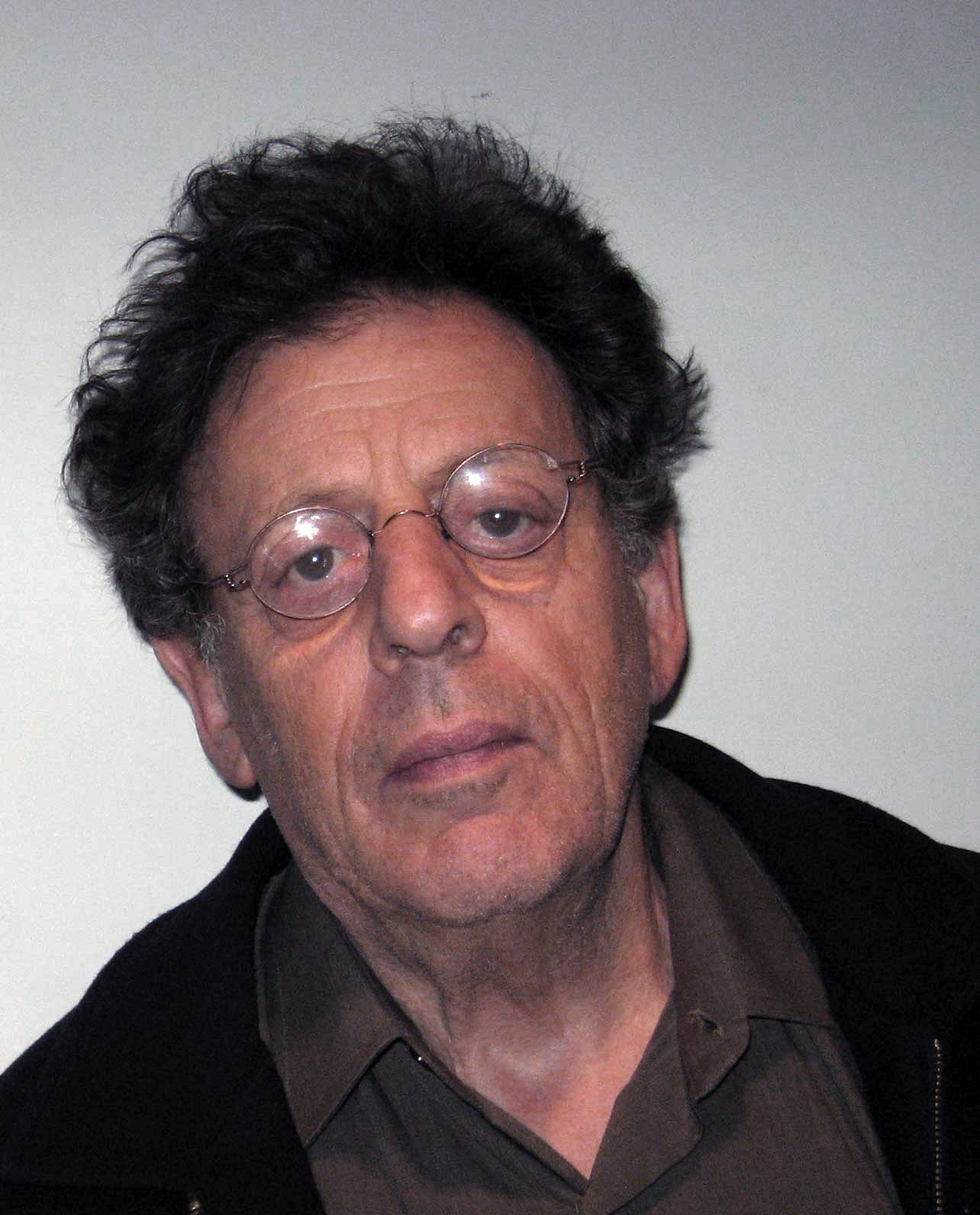
Philip Glass in 2007

Symphony No. 7 (also known as A Toltec Symphony) is a 2005 symphony by Philip Glass. The National Symphony Orchestra commissioned Glass to write it to commemorate the 60th birthday of conductor Leonard Slatkin. Slatkin conducted the debut concert on January 20, 2005, at the Kennedy Center, which Glass attended.

== Composition ==
The symphony is scored for piccolo, 2 flutes, 2 oboes, English horn, 2 B♭ clarinets, E♭ clarinet, 2 bassoons, 4 horns 3 trumpets, 3 trombones, tuba, timpani, rattle, tom-tom, wood block, glockenspiel, piano, celesta, harp, violins, violas, cellos, basses, organ, and chorus.

At 30 minutes long, it has three movements:

1. The Corn
2. The Hikuri (the Sacred Root)
3. The Blue Deer

== Inspiration ==
Glass said that he wrote the symphony about Mesoamerica and the life of Native Americans centuries before the arrival of European explorers. The first movement, "The Corn," focuses on the interplay between Mother Nature and those she provides for. "The Hikuri (the Sacred Root)" is not a root (it is a cactus) that grows in the northern and central Mexican deserts and is thought to be a gateway to the spiritual world, hikuri. Finally, the last movement is about "the holder of the Book of Knowledge," whom every truth-seeking person must face.

Glass has thus integrated three transcendental concepts of ancestral culture (Huichol) into the symphony: The first is corn, symbolizing the desire to return to the innocence of pre-adulthood and the connection with Mother Earth. The second is hikuri (peyote), a sacred cactus used in Huichol rituals to induce visions. Through these visions, the individual perceives deeper truths and is granted a sacred insight in which corn and the Blue Deer appear united, symbolizing the interconnectedness of life, sustenance, and spiritual awakening. The third is the Blue Deer, a divine messenger and guide. According to Huichol belief, encountering the Blue Deer marks the moment of transformation: the seeker is no longer ordinary but spiritually awakened, able to cross from the physical world into the spiritual realm.
