= Alexander Ivashkin =

Russian cellist and academic (1948–2014)

- Александр Васильевич Ивашкин
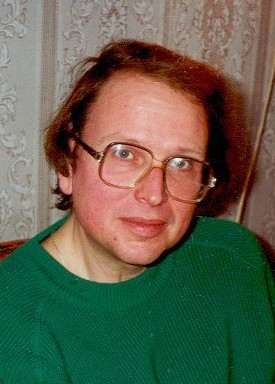
- Alexander Ivashkin, 1990, Moscow. Photo by D. Smirnov
- Born: 17 August 1948; Blagoveshchensk, Soviet Union
- Died: 31 January 2014 (aged 65); London, United Kingdom
- Occupations: Cellist, academic, writer
- Known for: Biographer of Alfred Schnittke
- Spouse: Natalia Pavlutskaya

Academic background
- Education: Russian Music Academy (M.Mus., D.M.A.)
- Alma mater: Russian State Institute for Arts Studies (Ph.D, D.Mus.)

Academic work
- Discipline: Historical musicology
- Institutions: Gnessin Institute; University of Canterbury; University of London
- Notable works: Alfred Schnittke (1996); A Schnittke Reader (2002) Musical career
- Instruments: Cello, piano
- Website: www.alexanderivashkin.com

Alexander Vasilievich Ivashkin (Russian: Александр Васильевич Ивашкин) (17 August 1948 – 31 January 2014) was a Russian cellist, writer, academic and conductor. He was a professor of music and the Chair of Performance Studies at Goldsmiths, University of London since 1999, the director of the Centre for Russian Music, and the curator of the Alfred Schnittke Archive. In 1996, he published the first English-language biography of the composer Alfred Schnittke.

== Early life and education ==
Ivashkin was born in Blagoveshchensk on 17 August 1948. At age 5, he was enrolled in the Gnessin School for Gifted Children in Moscow. He first played piano, and cello was a necessary part of his school curriculum. His education in cello and piano continued at the Gnessin Institute and Moscow Conservatory, where he was instructed by Boris Khaikin, Gennady Rozhdestvensky, and Valery Polyansky. Ivashkin first met Alfred Schnittke in the early 1960s, when they were neighbors in Moscow.

Ivashkin completed an M.Mus. in cello, piano, and historical musicology from the Russian Music Academy, a D.M.A. from the Russian Music Academy, a Ph.D. from the Russian State Institute for Arts Studies, and a D.Mus. from the Russian State Institute for Arts Studies.

== Career ==
In 1978, Ivashkin became co-principal cellist of the Bolshoi Theatre Orchestra and founded the Bolshoi Soloists, a new chamber orchestra. In the 1980s, he taught at the Gnessin Institute and then left the Soviet Union in 1990 for a teaching position at the University of Canterbury in New Zealand. He began his writing career as a music critic, and his first musicology book was about Charles Ives.

In 1995, Ivashkin and his wife, the cellist Natalia Pavlutskaya, founded the Adam International Cello Festival and Competition. In 1996, he published the first English-language biography of Alfred Schnittke.

In 1999, he became a professor of music at Goldsmiths, University of London. He was the director of the Centre for Russian Music at Goldsmiths, and he continued his career as a cellist. He became the curator of Alfred Schnittke Archive at Goldsmiths, which began when he arrived, and he was the editor-in-chief of the Schnittke Collected Works Critical Edition.

In 1999 he founded a series of research and performance seminars/symposia and international concert series at the Centre for Russian Music. He was also artistic director of annual festivals in London, including The VTB Capital Prize for Young Cellists.

As an author and editor, Ivashkin published more than twenty books, and more than 200 articles in Russia, Germany, Italy, the US, the UK and Japan.

Ivashkin collaborated with composers such as Krzysztof Penderecki, Edison Denisov, Sofia Gubaidulina, Giya Kancheli, Rodion Shchedrin, Nikolai Korndorf, Dmitri Smirnov, Elena Firsova, Alexander Raskatov, and Alfred Schnittke, as well as John Cage, George Crumb, Mauricio Kagel, Peter Sculthorpe, Brett Dean, Arvo Pärt, Vladimir Tarnopolsky, Augusta Read Thomas, James MacMillan, Lyell Cresswell, Roger Redgate, Gabriel Prokofiev and Gillian Whitehead.

Ivashkin made commercial recordings with a variety of labels, including Chandos, Naxos, Melodiya, RCA, Brilliant Classics, and Toccata Classics. His recorded work includes complete cello music composed by Sergei Rakhmaninov, Sergei Prokofiev, Dmitri Shostakovich, Nikolai Roslavets, Alexander Tcherepnin, Sofia Gubaidulina, Giya Kancheli, and Alfred Schnittke.

The instruments played by Ivashkin included a 1710 Giuseppe Guarneri 'filius Andrea' cello that was purchased by Chris Marshall from J & A Beare in London in 2000 and provided to Ivashkin as a permanent loan. After Ivashkin's death, the cello was named the 'Ivashkin Joseph Guarneri filius andreae of 1710' cello in honor of Ivashkin and provided to cellist Soo Bae as a five-year loan.

== Personal life ==
In 1969, Ivashkin married fellow musician Natalia Pavlutskaya, who survived her husband, who died of pancreatic cancer on 31 January 2014.

== Discography ==
1. "Russian Elegy". Original pieces for cello and piano written by Russian composers from the 18th to the 20th century. With Ingripd Wahlberg, piano. Ode Records MANU 1426, 1993.
2. "Music for cello solo". World premiere recordings. Melodyia SUCD 10–005566, 1994.
3. "Alfred Schnittke. Four Hymns for cello and ensemble". With the Bolshoi Soloists. [The Third Hymn is dedicated to A.Ivashkin.] Melodiya SUCD 00061 – Russia; Mobile Fidelity MFCD 915 – US). World premiere recording. New releases: VoxBox, US, 1994,1996. Diapason D’Or Award ( France)
4. "Alfred Schnittke, Music for Cello and Piano". World premiere recordings. With Tamas Vesmas. Ode Records MANU 1480, 1995.
5. "Sergei Prokofiev. Complete Music for Cello and Piano". With Tamas Vesmas. Ode Records MANU 1414, 1996.
6. "Bohiuslav Martinu. Chamber Music". Naxos, 8.553916, 1996.
7. "Alexander Gretchaninov. Cello Concerto, op. 8". World premiere recording. Chandos CHAN 9559, 1997.
8. "Dmitri Shostakovich. Cello Concertos Nos.1–2". BMG/Ode Records MANU 1542, 1997.
9. "Alfred Schnittke. Complete Music for Cello and Piano". With Irina Schnittke, piano. World premiere recording. Chandos, CHAN 9705, 1998. 'CD of the month', BBC Music Magazine, 1998.
10. "Alfred Schnittke. Cello Concerto No.2". With Russian State SO, Chandos CHAN 9722, 1999
11. "Alexander Tcherepnin. Complete Music for Cello and Piano". With Geoofrey Tozer, piano. Chandos, CHAN 9770, 1999.
12. "Unknown Shostakovich: Schumann – Shostakovich. Cello Concerto, op.129/126; Tishchenko-Shostakovich. Cello Concerto No.1". World premiere recording. With Russian State SO. Chandos, CHAN 9792 .
13. "Franz Schubert. String Quintet in C major D956, Dmitri Shostakovich. Piano Trio No 2". With Isabelle van Keulen, violin, Mark Lubotsky, violin, The Goldner Quartet, Boris Berman, piano. ABC Classics 465 841 -2, 2000.
14. "Under the Southern Cross. New music for solo cello from Australia and New Zealand". BMG, 1999. Recording Industry Award, 1999.
15. "Alfred Schnittke – Concerto No. 1". With Russian State Symphony Orchestra under Valery Poliansky. Chandos CHAN 9852, 2000. Best CD in last 5 years – 'Fanfare', US.
16. "Alfred Schnittke – Chamber Music". With Mark Lubotsky, violin, Irina Schnittke, piano, Theodore Kuchar, viola. Naxos 8-554728, 2000. Best CD of the year, BBC Music Magazine.
17. "Unknown Prokofiev -Concerto for cello &orchestra op.58, Concertino op 132, orchestrated by Vladimir Blok, Cadenza by Alfred Schnittke". With Russian State Symphony Orchestra under Valery Poliansky. Chandos, CHAN 9890, 2001.World premiere recording. The Strad Selection, July 2001.
18. "Nikolai Roslavets . Complete Music for cello and piano". With Tatyana Lazareva, piano. Chandos, CHAN 9881, 2001. CD of the month, BBC Music Magazine, April 2001.
19. "Sofia Gubaidulina. Works for Cello". With Natalia Pavlutskaya, cello, Rachel Johnston, cello, Miranda Wilson, cello, Malcolm Hicks, organ. Chandos, CHAN 9958, 2001. World premiere recording.
20. "Nikolai Korndorf. Passacaglia for cello solo" (dedicated to Alexander Ivashkin), String Trio, Piano Trio. With Patricia Kopachinskaya, violin, Daniel Raiskin, viola, Ivan Sokolov, piano. Megadisc 7817, 2001. World premiere recording.
21. "Dmitry Smirnov. (Introduction to Dmitri Smirnov) Piano Trio, Sonata for cello and piano, Elegy for cello solo (in memory of Edison Denisov)". With Patricia Kopachinskaya, violin, Ivan Sokolov, piano (and Alissa Firsova, piano). Megadisc 7818, 2001. World premiere recording.
22. "Sergei Prokofiev . Sinfonia-Concertante, op. 125". With Russian State Symphony Orchestra under Valery Poliansky.. Chandos, CHAN 9989, 2002 .
23. "Nikolai Myaskovsky. Cello Concerto". With Russian State Symphony Orchestra under Valery Poliansky. Chandos, CHAN 10025, 2002 .
24. "Sergei Prokofiev. Complete Cello/piano Music". With Tatyana Lazareva, piano. Chandos, CHAN 10045, 2003.
25. "Sergei Rakhmaninoiv. Complete Cello/piano Music". With Rustem Hayroudinoff, piano. Chandos CHAN 10095, 2004.
26. "Alfred Schnittke. Concerto Grosso No 2". With Tatyana Grindenko, violin, Russian State Symphony Orchestra under Valery Poliansky. Chandos, CHAN 10180, 2004.
27. "Giya Kancheli. Simi; Mourned by the wind for cello and orchestra". With Russian State Symphony Orchestra under Valery Poliansky Chandos 10297, 2005.
28. "Dmitri Shostakovich. Cello Concertos, Nos 1 and 2". With Russian State Symphony Orchestra under Valery Poliansky. Brilliant Classics 7620, 2006
29. "Alfred Schnittke. Concerto for Three, Dialogue". 'Chandos' (in preparation).
30. "Alexander Ivashkin plays Schnittke" (Double CD). Complete Cello Concertos and Sonatas. Chandos, CHAN 241–39, 2007. Best Re-issue of the month – Gramophone
31. "Due Celli (Music by Pergolesi, Vivaldi, Boccherini, Boismortier, Mozart, and Schnittke)". With Natalia Pavlutskaya, cello. Alma Classics 5031, 2007.
32. "Hommage a Anna Akhmatova." (includes Beethoven Sonata op 102, No 1; Bach – Solo cello BWV 1010; Britten – Solo Cello Suite No. 3; Kancheli – ' Nach dem Weinen' for solo cello', World premiere recording; Shostakovich – Cello Concerto No 2). Alma Classics 5022, 2008.
33. "Alexander Ivashkin plays Prokofiev" (Double CD). Complete Cello Concertos and Sonatas. Chandos, CHAN 241–41, 2008.
34. "Pacific Voyage". With Ora Barlow and Kim Halliday. Alma Classics 5028, 2009.
35. "Edison Denisov. The Blue Notebook". World premiere recording. With Elena Komarova, soprano, Vladimir Smekhov, reciter, Tigran Alikhanov, piano. Moscow: Moscow State Tchaikovsky Conservatoire SMC CD 0106, 2009.
36. "Alfred Schnittke: Discoveries. Yellow Sound, Dialogue for cello and instrumental ensemble, Variations for String Quartet". World premiere recording. Alexander Ivashkin, cello/voice. London: Toccata Classics TOCC 0091, 2010.
37. "Russian Cello Concertos 1960–2000. With various orchestras." Concertos by Denisov, Schnittke, Vustin, Shchedrin, including first recordings. Alma Classics, MANU 5029, 2010.
38. "Nikolay Korndorf. Complete Music for Cello." With Russian Philharmonic Orchestra, conducted by Konstantin Krimets. Anya Alexeev, piano. First recordings. London: Toccata Classics, TOCC 0128, 2012.
39. Ivashkin plays Gubaidulina, Tarnopolski and Redgate. Alma Classics 5032, 2013
40. Britten .Complete Music for Cello Solo and Cello and Piano. With Andrew Zolinsky (piano). Including world premiere recording of Britten's Sonata for cello and piano in A. Brilliant Classics 94729, 2013.

== Publications ==
Selected books

- Krzysztof Penderecki. Moscow: Sovetsky Kompozitor, 1983. 126 pp.
- Charl'z Aivz i muzyka XX vieka [Charles Ives and the 20th-century music]. Moscow: Sovetsky Kompozitor, 1991. 464 pp.
- Besedy s Alfredom Schnittke [Conversations with Alfred Schnittke ]. Moscow: The Culture Publishersg, 1994. 304 pp. Second, revised edition: Moscow: Klassica-XXI, 2003, 316 pp. German Edition: Munich: 1999. Japanese Edition: Tokyo, 2002.
- Alfred Schnittke. London: Phaidon Press, 1996, 240 pp.
- Rostrospective (On the Life and Achievement of Mstislav Rostropovich). Frankfurt-Schweinfurth: Reimund Maier Verlag, 1997. 142 pp.
- A Schnittke Reader. Bloomington /Indianapolis: Indiana University Press, 2002. 352pp.
- Alfred Schnittke: Stat'I o muzyke [Articles on music]. Edited by Alexander Ivashkin. Moscow: Kompozitor, 2003. 407 pp.
- Rostropovich. Tokyo: Shunjusha Publishing Company, 2007. 280 pp.
- Contemplating Shostakovich: Life, Music and Film . Edited by Alexander Ivashkin and Andrew Kirkman. Farnham: Ashgate, 2012
- Schnittke Studies. Edited by Gavin Dixon and Alexander Ivashkin. Bloomington-Indianapolis: Indiana University Press (in progress).

Selected articles

- 'John Cage in Soviet Russia'. Tempo, 67/266, October 2013, 18–27.
- 'Shostakovich, Old Believers and New Minimalists’. Contemplating Shostakovich: Life, Music and Film. Edited by Alexander Ivashkin and Andrew Kirkman. Farnham: Ashgate, 2012, 17–40.
- 'Kod Schnittke' ['The Schnittke Code']. Al'fredu Schnittke posviashchaetsia [Dedicated to Alfred Schnittke: Schnittke Yearbook, 8]. Moscow: Kompozitor, 2011: 13–24.
- "Symbols, Metaphors and Irrationalities in Twentieth-Century Music." Cataño, Rafael Jiménez and Yarza, Ignacio (ed.). Mimesi, Verità e Fiction. Roma: Edusc, 2009, 69–87.
- "Cooling the Volcano: Prokofiev’s Cello Concerto Op. 58 and ‘Symphony-Concerto’ Op. 125". Three Oranges, Journal of the Serge Prokofiev Foundation, No. 18 (November 2009): 7–14.
- "Podsolnukh [Sunflower]. Rostropovich in memoriam". Muzykal'naya Academia. Moscow, 2007/3: 1 – 16. Short English version: Radius Solis. Three Oranges, Journal of the Serge Prokofiev Foundation, No. 14 (November 2007): 25–27.
- "Dvoinaya pererabotka otkhodov v sovetskoi muzyke [Double recycling in Soviet music]". Iskusstvo XX veka: elite i massy [ The 20th-century Art: Elite and Masses]. Nizhny Novgorod: The Glinka Conservatoire Press, 2005, 12–18.
- "Logic of Absurdity or Taste of Freedom? Alexander Knaifel and his opera 'Alice in Wonderland'". Tempo, 219 (2002): 34–36
- "Alfred Schnittke." New Grove Dictionary. London: Macmillan. 2001 (with Ivan Moody)
- ‘…und wenn es mir den Hals bricht’. "Zum Gedenken an Alfred Schnittke". MusikTexte. Heft 78, March 1999, 27- 31.
- "Shostakovich and Schnittke: the erosion of symphonic syntax". D.Fanning (ed.) Shostakovich Studies. Cambridge: Cambridge University Press, 1995, 252–268.
- "The Paradox of Russian Non-Liberty". The Musical Quarterly, vol. 76, no. 4 (1992): 543–556
- "Die Musik als grosse Buhne". Kagel . . . 1991. Köln: DuMont Buchverlag, 1991, 110–119
- "Charles Ives: Otkrytie Ameriki". Zapadnoye Iskusstvo. XX vek. [Charles Ives: Discovery of the America. In Western Art. 20th Century]. Moscow: Nauka, 1991, 222–247
- "Sowietische Musik. Von der Struktur zum Symbol". Sowietische Musik im Licht der Perestroika. Berlin: Laaber, 1990, 109–117
- "Post-October Soviet Art: Canon and Symbol". The Musical Quarterly, vol. 74, no. 2 (1990): 350–368

Music scores edited

- Sergei Rakhmaninov. Melody on a Theme for cello and piano. First publication. Edited and prefaced by Alexander Ivashkin. Hamburg: Hans Sikorski Musikverlage (in preparation).
- Alfred Schnittke. Collected Works. Critical Edition in sixty-seven volumes. Compiled and prefaced by Alexander Ivashkin. St.Petersburg: Compozitor, 2007 – . Alexander Ivashkin, editor-in-chief (in progress).
- Alexander Grechaninov. Cello Concerto ( 1895). Performance edition from the manuscript. Moscow: State Symphony Capella, 1998.
- Frangiz Ali-Zade. Habil-Sayahy for cello and piano. Edited and prefaced by Alexander Ivashkin. Hamburg, Hans Sikorski Internationale Musikverlage, 1991.
- Twentieth-century American piano music. Compiled, prefaced and commented on by Alexander Ivashkin and Andrei Khitruk. Moscow: Muzyka State Publishers, 1991.
- Charles Ives. Works for Orchestra. Critical Edition. Compiled, prefaced and commented on by Alexander Ivashkin. Kiev: Muzychna Ukraina, 1990.
